= List of tallest buildings in Milan =

Skyline of Milan Skyline di Milano
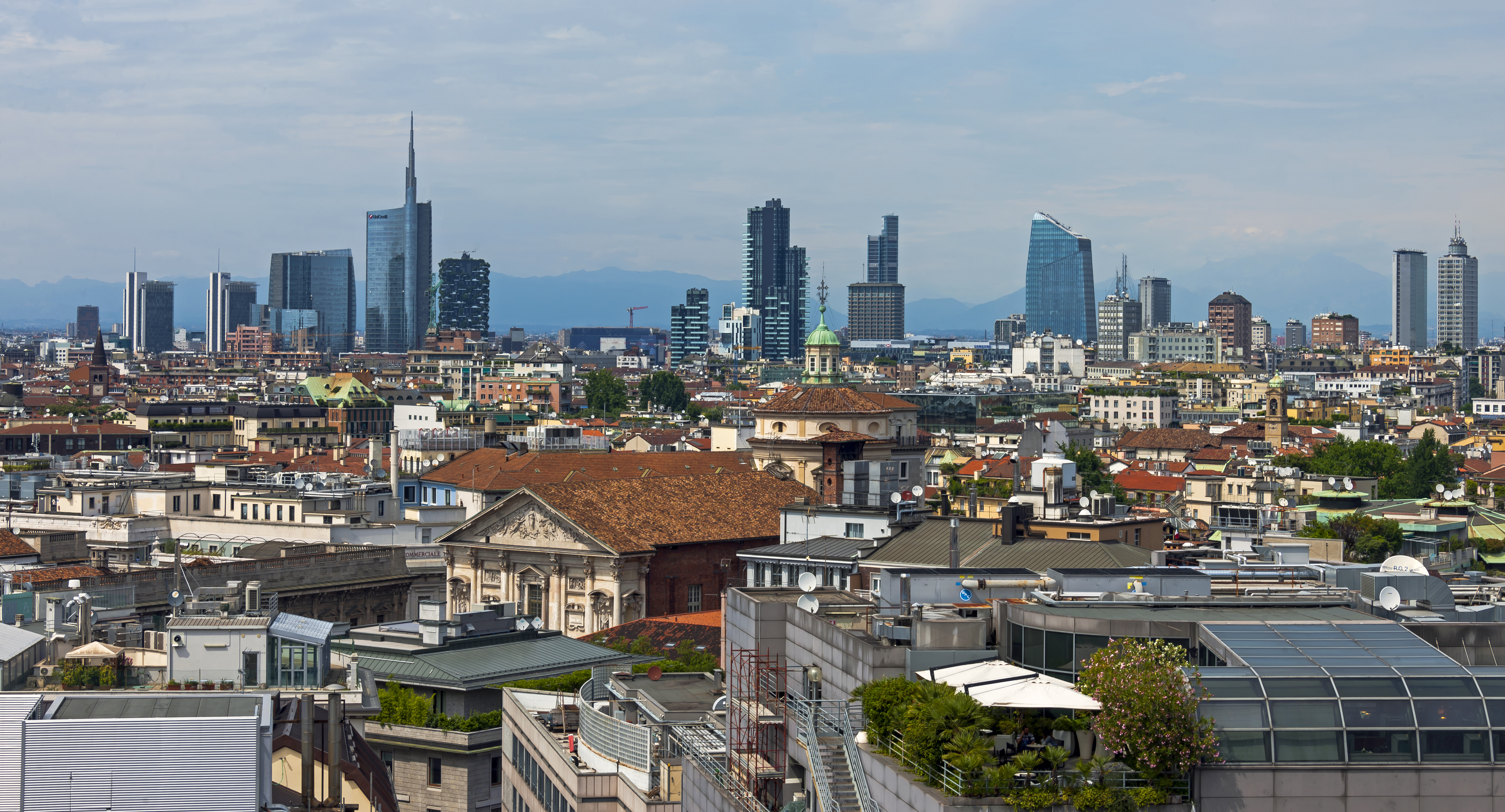
- The skyline of Porta Nuova as seen from the roof of the Milan Cathedral in 2016
- Tallest building: UniCredit Tower (2012)
- Tallest building height: 217.7 m (714 ft)
- Major clusters: Porta Nuova; CityLife
- First 150 m+ building: Palazzo Lombardia (2011)

Number of tall buildings (2026)
- Taller than 100 m (328 ft): 17 + 1 T/O
- Taller than 150 m (492 ft): 5
- Taller than 200 m (656 ft): 2

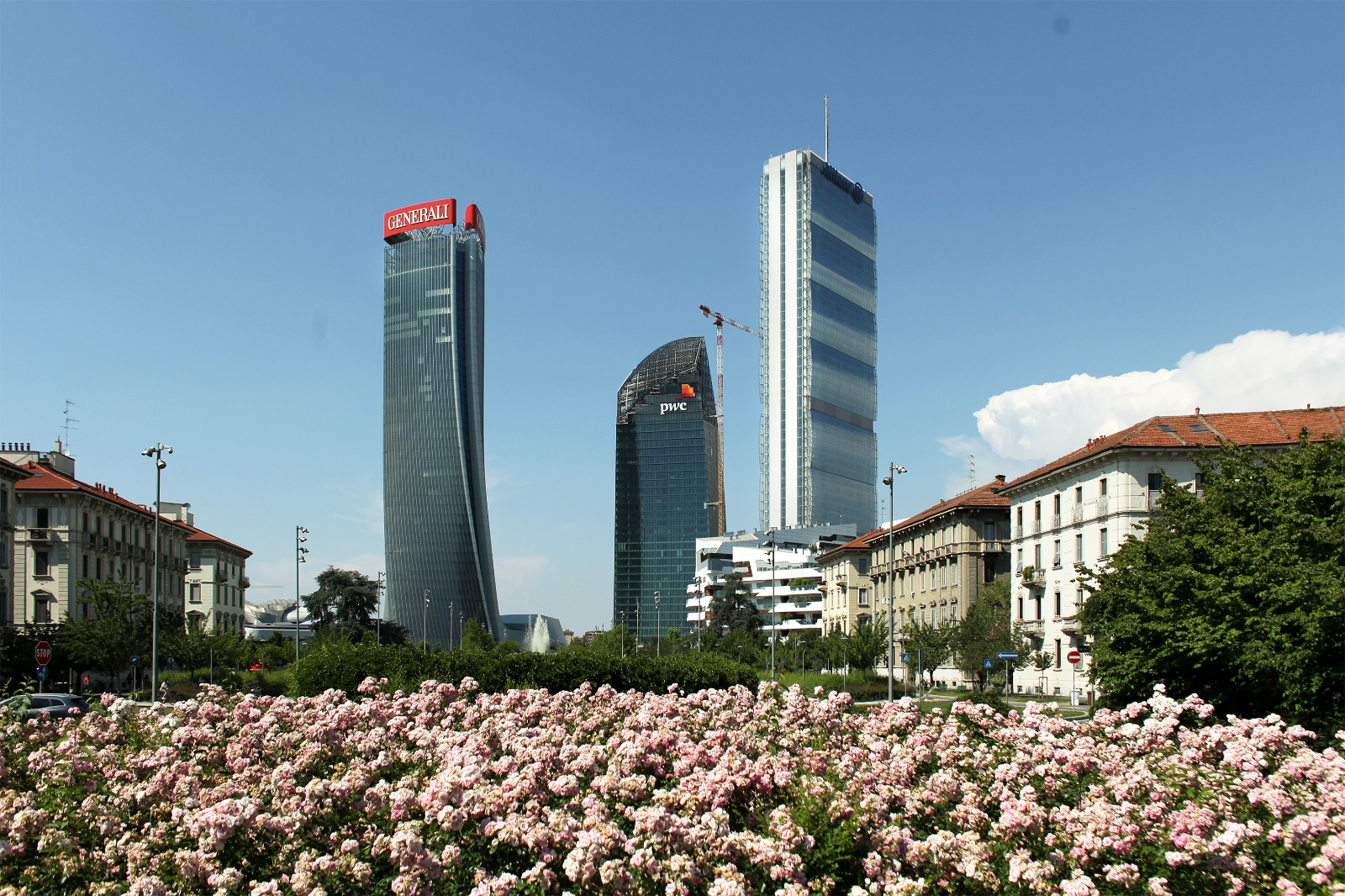
Milan's CityLife district

Milan is the second-largest city in Italy, with a population of 1.4 million. Its wider metropolitan area is the most populous in the country, ahead of the capital Rome, with over 6 million inhabitants. As such, Milan is home to most of Italy's tallest buildings. It is one of the largest skylines in southern Europe, and by far the largest in Italy. As of 2026, Milan is home to 18 buildings that reach a height of 100 metres (328 feet), five of which are taller than 150 m (492 ft). The tallest is the 217.7 m (714 ft) Unicredit Tower, is an office skyscraper completed in 2012. Milan's skyline is known for skyscrapers with unique architecture and massing, such as the twisting Generali Tower, the curved Libeskind Tower, and the tree-covered Bosco Verticale.

While Milan's first skycraper is considered to be the Snia Viscosa Tower, built in 1937, most of the city's early high-rises date back to the 1950s, benefiting from a post-war economic boom. Several innovative and modernist skyscrapers were completed, such as the mushroom-shaped Torre Velasca, the modernist Grattacielo Pirelli, and the international-style towers of Torre Galfa and Breda Tower. Following this, few high-rises were completed in the city from the 1960s to the 1980s, as its economic prosperity was overshadowed by the Years of Lead. In the early 21st century, a series of large-scale redevelopments have led to the development of the city's modern skyline, leading to the formation of two new business districts, Porta Nuova and CityLife.

Today, most of Milan's skyscrapers are located in Porta Nuova, which sits to the north of the city centre, adjacent to the older business district of Centro Direzionale. CityLife, in the city's northwest, is anchored by the three towers of Allianz Tower, Generali Tower, and Libeskind Tower, which dominate the immediate area. The Torre Velasca stands relatively isolated right in the historic city centre. There are also a small but increasing number of residential high-rises being built throughout the city, most notably in the district of Cascina Merlata.

== History ==
Number of buildings by height in Milan by the end of each year. Click on the legend to toggle a specific height on or off. View chart definition.

=== 1950s ===
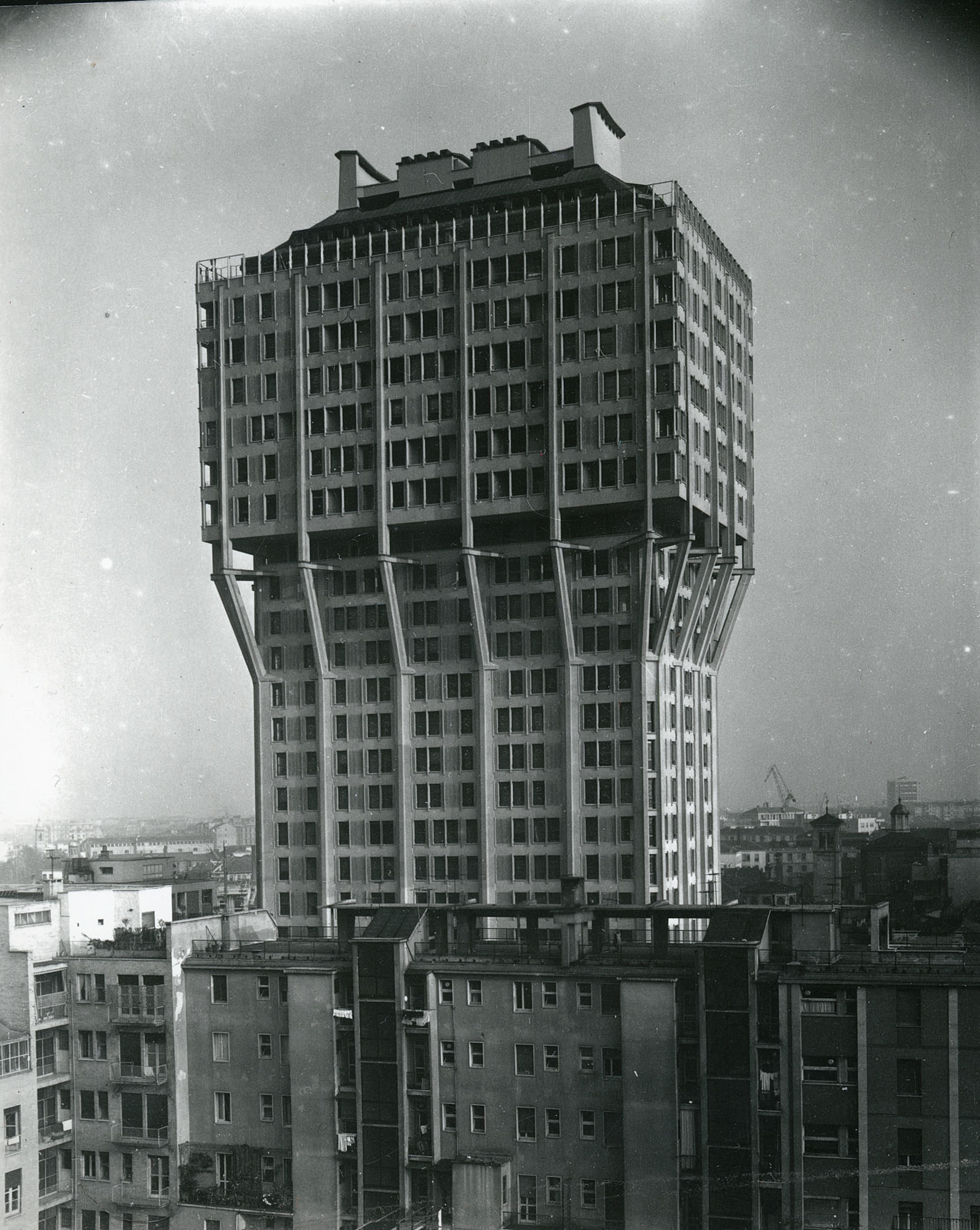
Torre Velasca, taken in the late 1950s

During World War II, Milan was subject to substantial bombing from allied forces. Reconstruction of the city took place quickly after the war, and the city's economy benefited from the Italian economic miracle that lasted until the 1960s. Milan was one of Italy's most important industrial centres As a result, a significant number of high-rises were built in Milan in the 1950s. One early example was the 21-storey Centro Svizzero (Swiss Centre) built in 1952, to serve as the new headquarters of the Swiss Circle of Milan, whose earlier premises were destroyed during the war. The tower was built in the International style that was exemplified by buildings such as the United Nations Secretariat Building in New York City. It became the tallest building in Milan for two years, until it was overtaken by the Breda Tower.

The Breda Tower, built in 1954, is famous for being the first building to cross the height of the Milan Cathedral, making it Milan's tallest free-standing structure. The building features several distinguishing elements, such as bow windows and terraces on its sides and the use of color on the facade covered with turquoise ceramic stoneware, expressing "a strong rejection of monotony". Torre Velasca, built in the historic city centre near the cathedral, is a 26-storey mixed-use skyscraper, best known for its distinctive mushroom-like shape. Its structure recalls the Lombard tradition of medieval fortresses and towers, each having a massive profile. In such fortresses, the lower parts were always narrower, while the higher parts were propped up by wood or stone beams. As a consequence, the shape of this building is said to be the result of a modern interpretation of the typical medieval Italian castle.

In 1958, the Pirelli Building was completed, which surpassed the Breda Tower as Milan's tallest building. At a height of 127 m (417 ft), it would remain the tallest building in Milan and Italy for over four decades. Characterized by a structural skeleton, curtain wall façades and tapered sides, it was among the first skyscrapers to abandon the customary block form. Built for the Pirelli tyre company, it went on to inspire the design for the MetLife Building in New York City and the Banco Sabadell Tower in Barcelona. Many of Milan's early high-rises, including the Pirelli Building and the Breda Tower were located within the then-new business district of Centro Direzionale, which was developed from the 1950s to the early 1960s.

=== 1960s–1990s ===
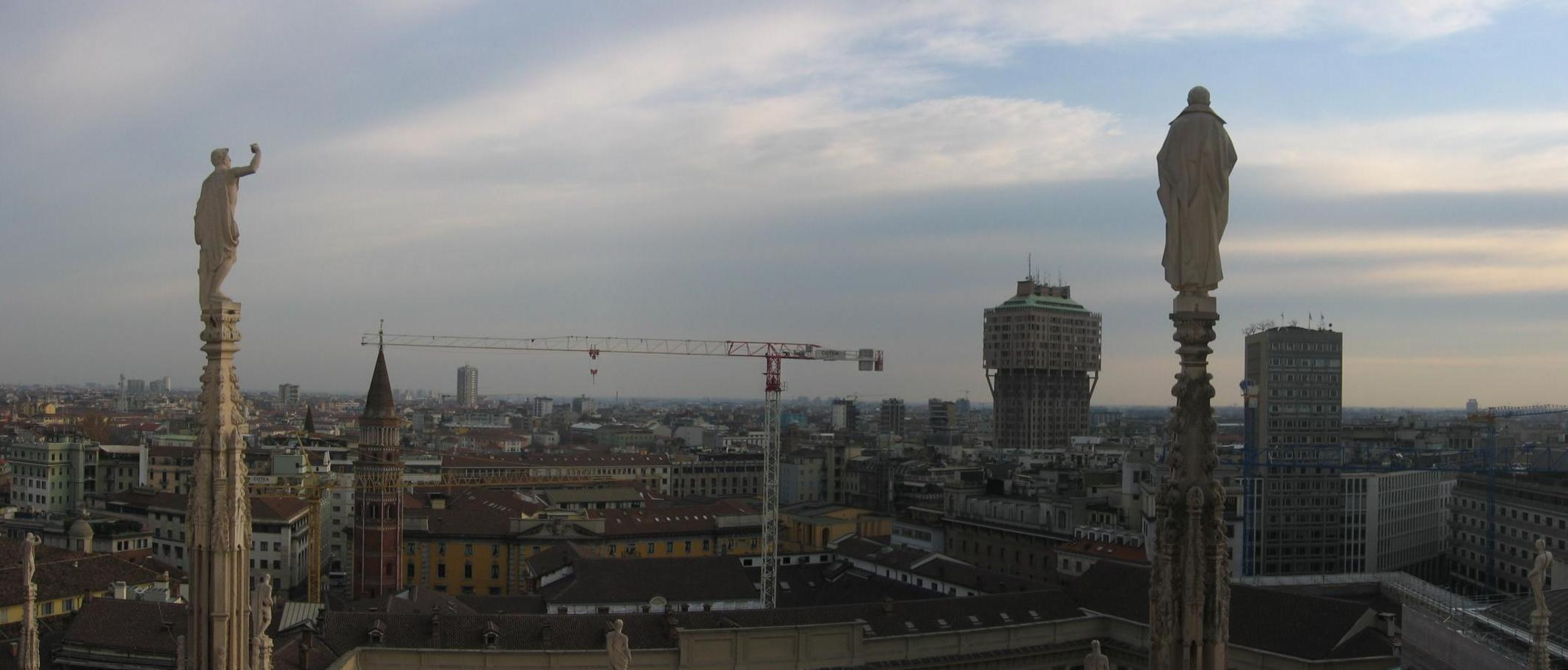
Milan's skyline before the advent of Porta Nuova in 2007

High-rise development continued in the early 1960s, with modernist buildings such as the Torre Servizi Tecnici Comunali being built in 1963 and Porta Romana Tower in 1965. Around this time, eight residential high-rises were completed in the southern district of Gratosoglio to address the need for housing, largely using prefabricated blocks. Designed with the intention of being a “self-sufficient district”, the towers were built up to a height of 56 m (184 ft), and the district has since become known as a troubled"dormitory district".

From the mid-1960s, Milan would enter a period where high-rise construction was largely absent, with no notable skyscrapers being completed in the 1970s and 1980s. The city's economy itself was affected by the so-called Years of lead, which saw a surge of street violence, labour strikes and political terrorism. In 1970, the Regional Council of Lombardy moved their meeting place to the Pirelli Building. Milan's economy and image was revived in the 1980s, and the city became known as one of the world's fashion capitals.

The Garibaldi Towers, the first buildings to reach a height of 100 m (328 ft) since the 1950s, were completed in 1992. Built by Italy's state railway company, Ferrovie dello Stato Italiane, the twin buildings are located next to Porta Garibaldi railway station. In 2012, the towers underwent a renovation to make them more environmentally sustainable, with the addition of solar and photovoltaic panels, natural ventilation, interactive facades, and bioclimatic greenhouses on every floor.

=== 2000s ===
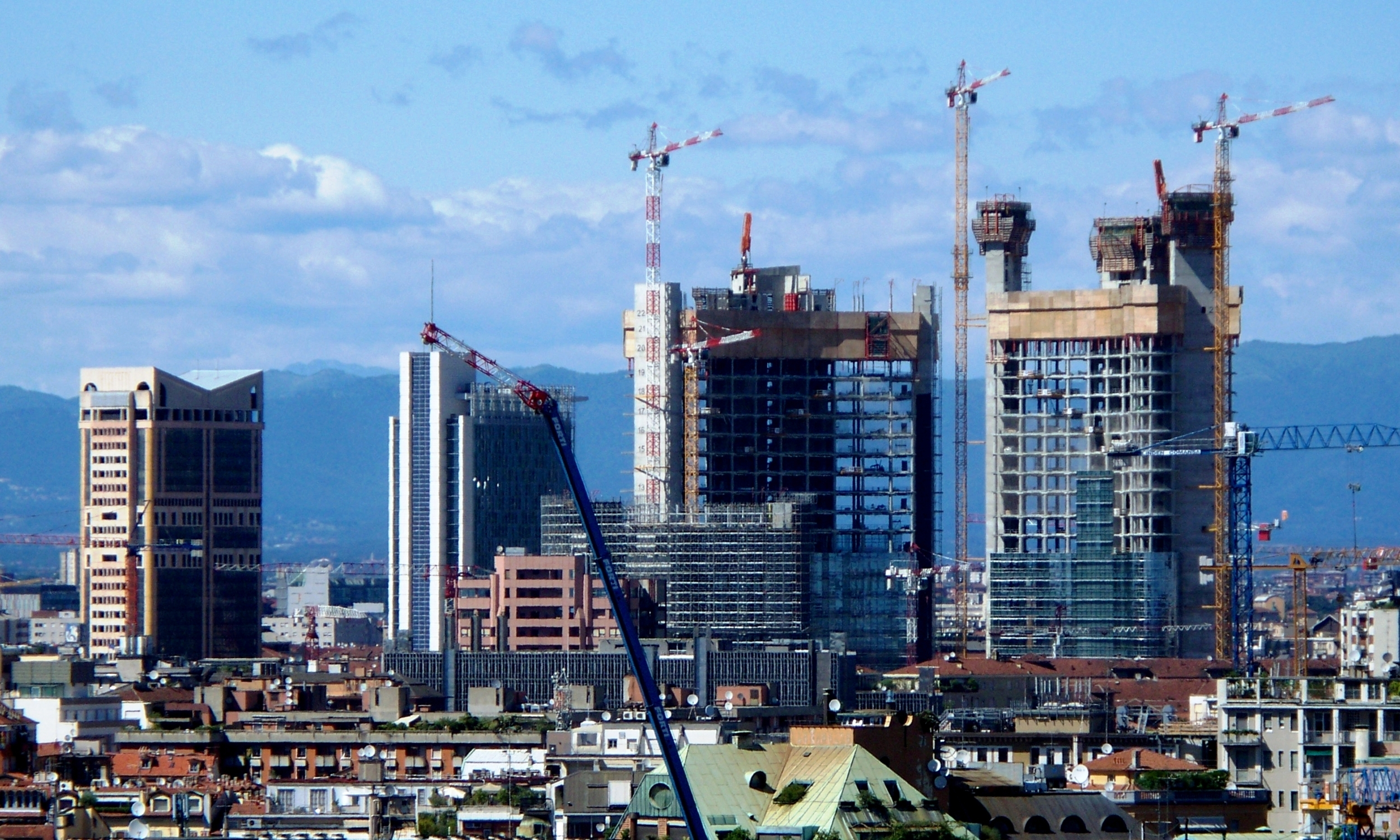
Porta Nuova, seen under construction in 2010

At the turn of the 21st century, Milan was already changing from a primarily industrial city to an increasingly service-based one. The area where the Porta Nuova business district now sits was occupied by industrial land and unused railyards. Plans for a new 290,000 square metre project by developer COIMA were approved in 2005, and construction began in 2009. The name of Porta Nuova ("New Gate") was chosen for the well-preserved neoclassic gate built in 1810 on the site. The first skyscrapers in the district were completed in the early 2010s, with the Palazzo Lombardia being completed in 2011, briefly being Milan's tallest building at 161 m (529 ft). The building serves as the seat of the regional government of Lombardy. Milan's current tallest building, Unicredit Tower, was completed in 2012. At a height of 218 m (714 ft), Unicredit Tower is the tallest building in Italy, mainly due to its 80.5 m (264 ft) spire. It houses the headquarters of UniCredit, Italy's largest bank by assets. The architecture of Porta Nuova is seen as a departure from Italy's traditional urban form.

Development in Porta Nuova continued in the 2010s. One of Milan's most well-known skyscrapers are the two residential towers of Bosco Verticale, completed in Porta Nuova in 2014. The name of the complex translates to "Vertical Forest", referring to the 480 large and medium trees, 300 small trees, 11,000 perennial and covering plants, and 5,000 shrubs throughout the buildings, promoting an environmentally friendly "urban ecosystem". This is reflective of the "biophilic" design of Porta Nuova in general, which has ample green spaces and flora along pedestrian walkways.

Milan's other major skyscraper cluster is CityLife, which sits on the historic "Fiera Campionaria" district. It used to hold the fair grounds for the Fiera Milano trade fair until 2005, when the trade fair was moved to Fiera Milano Rho. The area, about 250,000 square metres (2.69 million sq ft), was the subject of an international tender in 2004, and construction began in 2007. The development is centered around three office skyscrapers, which make up the second, third, and fourth-tallest buildings in Milan. The first to be built was Allianz Tower, completed in 2015. Housing the headquarters of the Italian subsidiary of the German financial services company Allianz, the tower's glass facade creates distinct rounded forms. Generali Tower, built in 2018, is a twisting skyscraper designed by Zaha Hadid, and hosts offices of Italian insurance company Assicurazioni Generali. Lastly the curved Libeskind Tower, or PwC Tower, was completed in 2020. Besides the three main towers, CityLife also includes the high-rise apartment developments of Hadid Residences, Libeskind Residences, a cultural pavilion, public spaces, and a mall.

=== 2020s–present ===
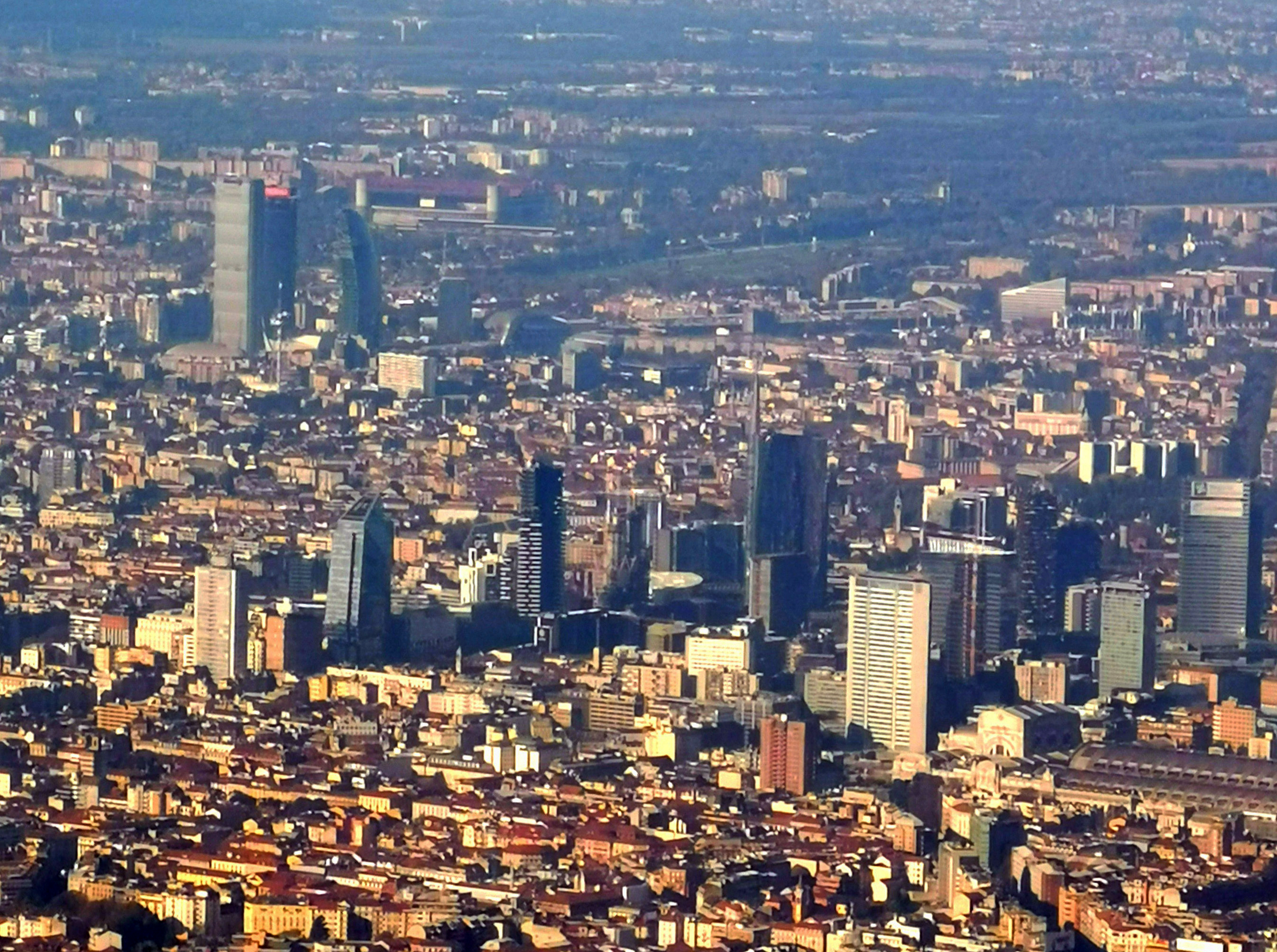
Aerial view of Milan in 2020, with Porta Nuova in the foreground and CityLife in the background to the left

The Porta Nuova district has continued to grow with additions such as Gioia 22 in 2020 and Unipol Tower in 2023. Construction is underway on a fourth major tower in the CityLife district. Known as CityWave (also known as "Il Portico", or "The Porch" in English), the uniquely shaped building, wider than it is tall, resembles a giant, curved canopy with a "giant" sweeping rooftop. It is described as being "neither high-rise or low-rise", but a hybrid between the two by architects Bjarke Ingles Group.

Residential high-rise development is also becoming more common across Milan, mainly in the Cascina Merlata district, where the Expo Village for Milan's Expo 2015 was built. After the expo, further towers have been added to the growing cluster, such as the 25-storey Città Contemporanea 2.0 in 2020. Notable completions elsewhere include TorreMilano (2022) and Torre Aurora near CityLife.

A major regeneration scheme is expected to occur on the former Scalo Farini railyard, northwest of Porta Nuova. Redevelopment of the 360,000 square metre (3.9 sq mi) site could potentially add a significant number of high-rises to Milan's skyline.

== Cityscape ==
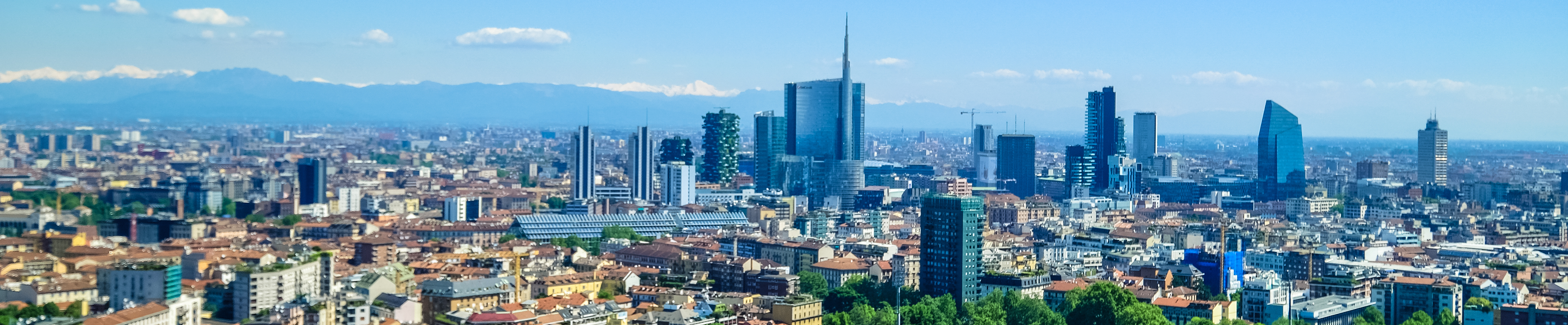
Skyline of Milan in 2017

== Map of tallest buildings ==
This map displays the location of buildings taller than 100 m (328 ft) in Milan. Each marker is coloured by the decade of the building's completion.

Buildings taller than 100 m (328 ft) in Milan. An asterisk (*) next to the name of the building indicates it is located outside the map.
- 1950s and before
- 1960s
- 1970s
- 1980s
- 1990s
- 2000s
- 2010s
- 2020s
1 Unicredit Tower – Tower A
2 Allianz Tower
3 Generali Tower
4 Libeskind Tower
5 Palazzo Lombardia
6 Torre Solaria
7 Torre Diamante
8 Pirelli Tower
9 UnipolSai Tower
10 Gioia 22
11 Torre Breda
12 Bosco Verticale – Tower E
13 Torre Velasca
14 TheTris*
15 Torre Galfa
16 Garibaldi Towers – Tower A
17 Unicredit Tower – Tower B

== Tallest buildings ==
This list ranks completed high-rises and free-standing structures in Milan that stand at least 100 m (328 ft) tall as of 2025, based on standard height measurement. This includes spires and architectural details but does not include antenna masts. The “Year” column indicates the year of completion. Buildings tied in height are sorted by year of completion with earlier buildings ranked first, and then alphabetically.

Was the tallest building in Milan upon completion
Topped out but not yet completed

Rank	Name	Image	Location	Height m (ft)	Floors	Year	Purpose	Notes
1	Unicredit Tower – Tower A		Porta Nuova 45°29′02″N 9°11′24″E	217.7 (714)	35	2012	Office	Tallest building in Italy since 2012. Ranked 8th in the Emporis Skyscraper Award 2012 for excellence in aesthetics and functional design. It is 137 m (449 ft) tall without the spire. Designed by architect Cesar Pelli.
2	Allianz Tower		CityLife 45°28′39″N 9°09′27″E	209.2 (686)	50	2015	Office	Originally nicknamed "Il Dritto" ("The Straight One"). Received third place in the Emporis Skyscraper Award in 2016. It is 242 m (794 ft) tall with the antenna. Designed by architects Arata Isozaki and Andrea Maffei.
3	Generali Tower		CityLife 45°28′40″N 9°09′19″E	177.4 (582)	44	2018	Office	Originally nicknamed "Lo Storto" ("The Twisted One"). Awarded first place for excellence in the mid-rise category by the American Concrete Institute in 2019. Designed by architect Zaha Hadid.
4	Libeskind Tower		CityLife 45°28′44″N 9°09′24″E	175.5 (576)	31	2020	Office	Originally nicknamed "Il Curvo" ("The Curved One"). Designed by architect Daniel Libeskind. Now also known as the PwC Tower.
5	Palazzo Lombardia		Porta Nuova 45°29′13″N 9°11′44″E	161.3 (529)	39	2011	Government	Won the 2012 International Architecture Award for the best new global design. Tallest building in Italy from 2010 to 2012. Designed by architectural group Pei Cobb Freed & Partners.
6	Torre Solaria		Porta Nuova 45°28′56″N 9°11′37″E	143 (469)	37	2013	Residential	Tallest residential building in Milan and in Italy. Designed by architectural firm Arquitectonica.
7	Torre Diamante		Porta Nuova 45°28′52″N 9°11′47″E	140 (459)	30	2012	Office	Originally named "Torre Diamante" ("Diamond Tower"), now known as the BNP Paribas Tower. Designed by architectural firm Kohn Pederson Fox.
N/A	Torre RAI		Corso Sempione 45°28′43″N 9°09′57″E	135 (443)	–	1952	Communication	Part of the Rai Production Centre in Milan.
8	Pirelli Tower		Porta Nuova / Centro Direzionale 45°29′05″N 9°12′04″E	127.1 (417)	32	1958	Government	Tallest building in the European Economic Community from 1958 to 1966. Tallest building in Italy from 1958 to 1995. The building has been a model for the MetLife Building in New York City and Alpha Tower in Birmingham. On 18 April 2002, a light airplane crashed into the 25th floor. Restoration work was completed in 2005. Designed by architect Giò Ponti.
9	UnipolSai Tower		Porta Nuova 45°28′58″N 9°11′30″E	125.6 (412)	23	2023	Office	Designed by Mario Cucinella Architects.
10	Gioia 22		Porta Nuova 45°29′07″N 9°11′50″E	121.4 (398)	25	2020	Office	Originally nicknamed "The Splinter". Designed by architects Gregg E. Jones and Paolo Caputo.
11	Torre Breda		Porta Nuova / Centro Direzionale 45°28′49″N 9°11′58″E	117 (384)	30	1954	Mixed-use	Tallest building in Italy from 1954 to 1958. Designed by architect Luigi Mattioni. Restoration work was completed in 2009.
12	Bosco Verticale – Tower E		Porta Nuova 45°29′09″N 9°11′26″E	115.9 (380)	27	2014	Residential	The building won the 2014 International Highrise Award. Won the award for the "Best Tall Building Worldwide" in 2015, organized by the Council on Tall Buildings and Urban Habitat. In October 2019, the CTBUH nominated Bosco Verticale as one of "The 50 Most Influential Tall Buildings of the Last 50 Years". Designed by architect Stefano Boeri.
N/A	Torre Branca		Parco Sempione 45°28′24″N 9°10′22″E	108 (354)	–	1933	Observation	Designed by architect Giò Ponti.
N/A	Milan Cathedral		Centro Storico 45°27′51″N 9°11′30″E	106.7 (350)	–	1965	Religious	Also known as Duomo. The third-largest church in the world after St. Peter's Basilica and the Seville Cathedral.
13	Torre Velasca		Centro Storico 45°27′36″N 9°11′26″E	106 (348)	26	1958	Mixed-use	The building's design is inspired by the Milan Cathedral and Sforza Castle.
14	Gioia 20 Tower		Porta Nuova 45°29′05″N 9°11′46″E	106 (348)	24	2026	Office	Designed by architects Antonio Citterio and Patricia Viel.
15	TheTris		Barona 45°26′07″N 9°10′07″E	105.5 (346)	21	2025	Office	Formerly known as SkyDrop. Designed by architectural group Be.st. Tallest building in the Barona district.
16	Torre Galfa		Porta Nuova / Centro Direzionale 45°29′11″N 9°11′56″E	102.4 (336)	31	1959	Mixed-use	Designed by architect Melchiorre Bega. Underwent a renovation in 2018.
17	Garibaldi Towers – Tower A		Porta Nuova 45°29′06″N 9°11′17″E	100 (328)	25	1992	Office	Underwent an extensive renovation in 2012.
18	Unicredit Tower – Tower B		Porta Nuova 45°29′03″N 9°11′20″E	100 (328)	22	2012	Office	Designed by architect Cesar Pelli.

== Tallest under construction or proposed ==
=== Under construction ===
The following table ranks high-rises under construction in Milan that are expected to be at least 100 m (328 ft) tall as of 2026, based on standard height measurement. The “Year” column indicates the expected year of completion. Buildings that are on hold are not included.

Name	Location	Purpose	Height m (ft)	Floors	Year	Notes
A2A Tower	Porta Romana	Office	144 (472)	28	2026	Also known as Torre Faro. Designed by architects Antonio Citterio and Patricia Viel.
Hotel Scarampo	Portello	Hotel	110 (361)	21	–	Designed by architect Michele de Lucchi.
Gioia 20 Tower	Porta Nuova	Office	106 (348)	24	2026	Designed by architects Antonio Citterio and Patricia Viel.
CityWave	CityLife	Office	105 (344)	21	2026	Designed by Bjarke Ingels Group.

=== Proposed ===
The following table ranks approved and proposed high-rises in Milan that are expected to be at least 150 m (492 ft) tall as of 2026, based on standard height measurement. The “Year” column indicates the expected year of completion. A dash “–“ indicates information about the building's height or year of completion is not available.

Name	Location	Purpose	Height m (ft)	Floors	Year	Status	Architect
Palazzo Sistema	Porta Nuova	Office	122.5 (402)	26	2028	Approved	Park Associati
Valtellina	Scalo Farini	Mixed-use	117 (384)	25	–	Proposed	3XN
Botanica	Porta Nuova	Residential	110 (361)	25	–	Proposed	Stefano Boeri

== Timeline of tallest buildings ==
Building	Image	Years as tallest	Height m (ft)	Floors
Snia Viscosa Tower		1937–1952	60 (197)	15
Centro Svizzero		1952–1954	80 (262)	21
Torre Breda		1954–1958	117 (384)	30
Pirelli Tower		1958–2010	127.1 (417)	32
Palazzo Lombardia		2010–2012	161.3 (529)	39
Unicredit Tower – Tower A		2012–present	217.7 (714)	35

== Skylines ==
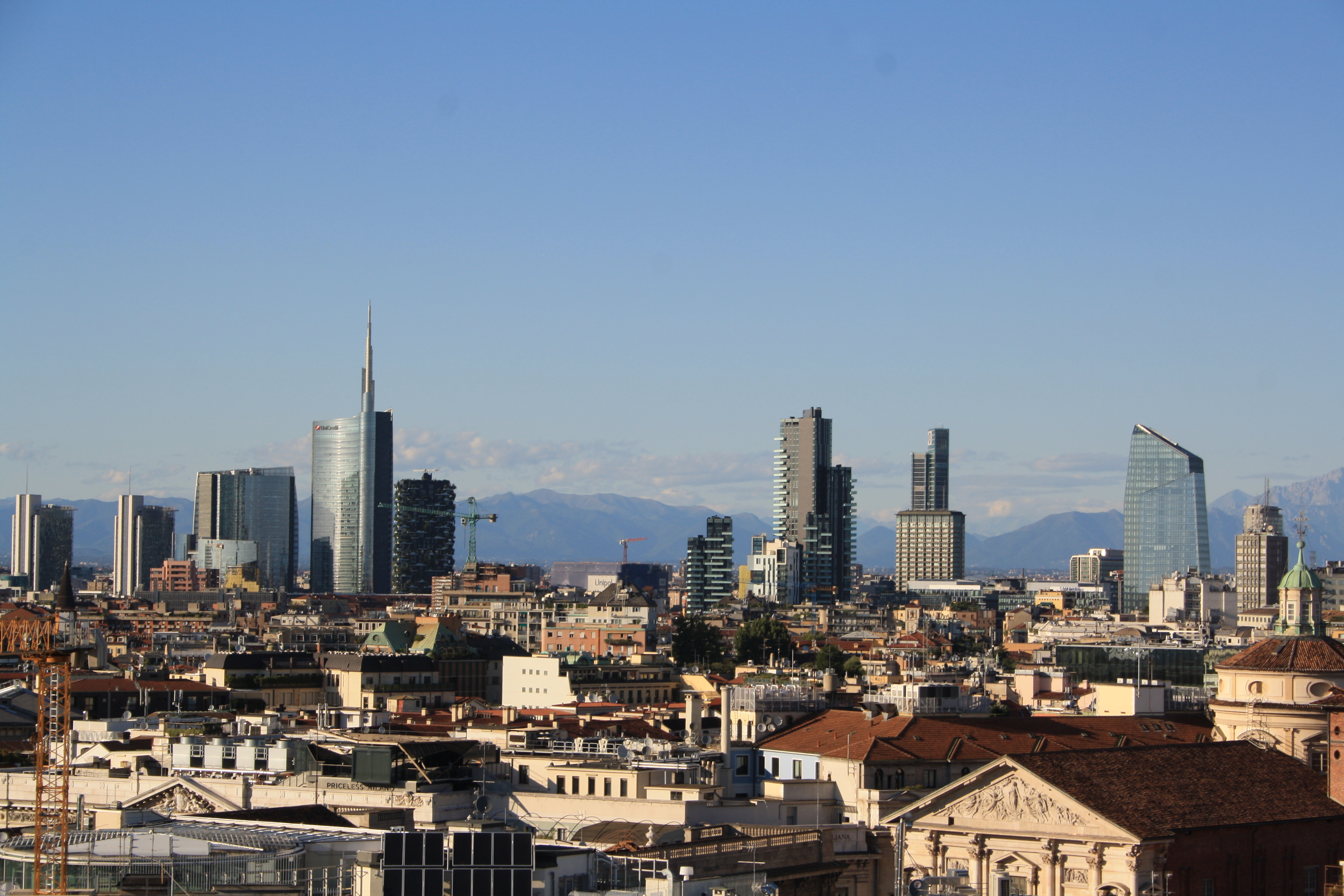
Porta Nuova

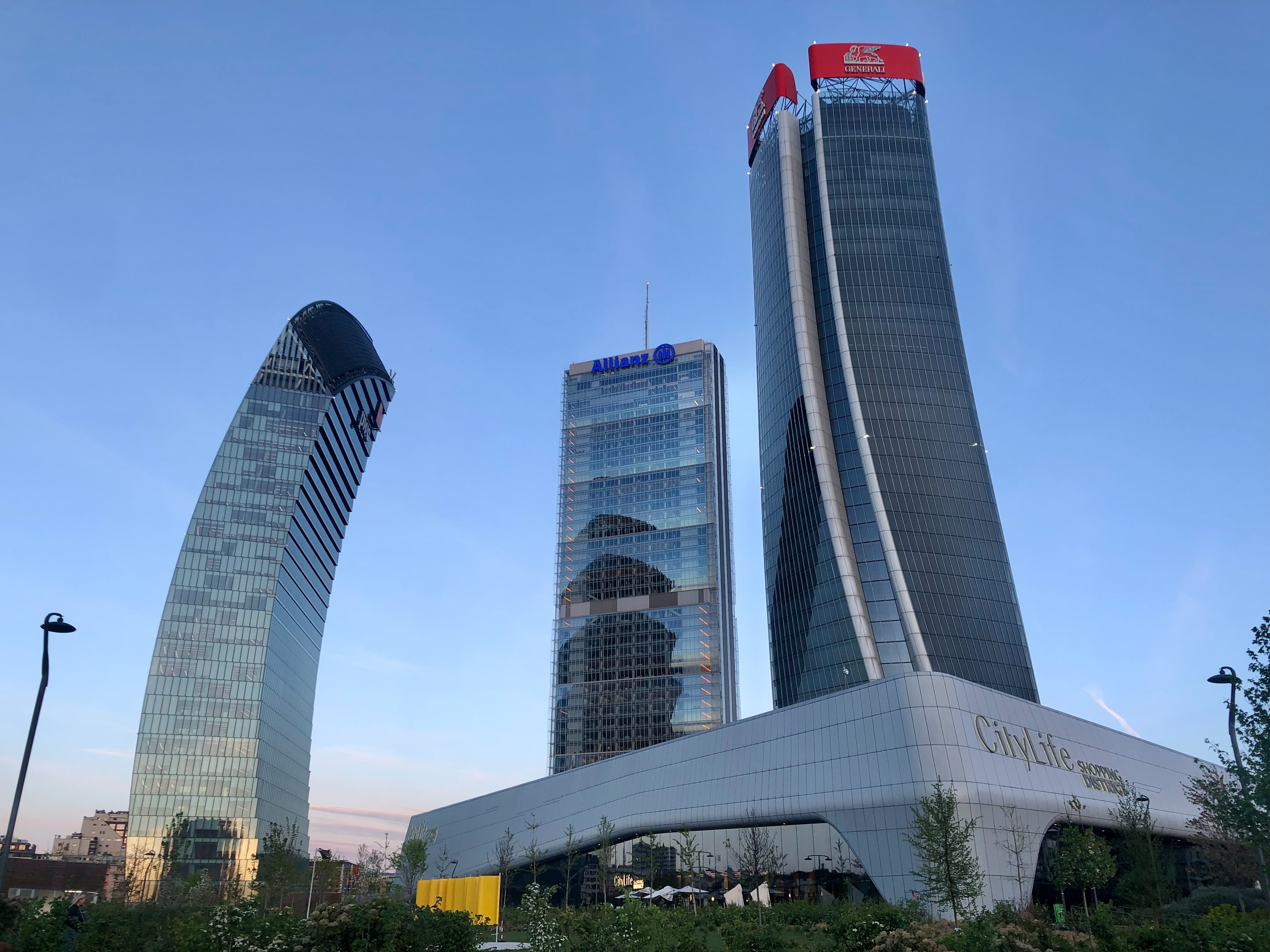
CityLife

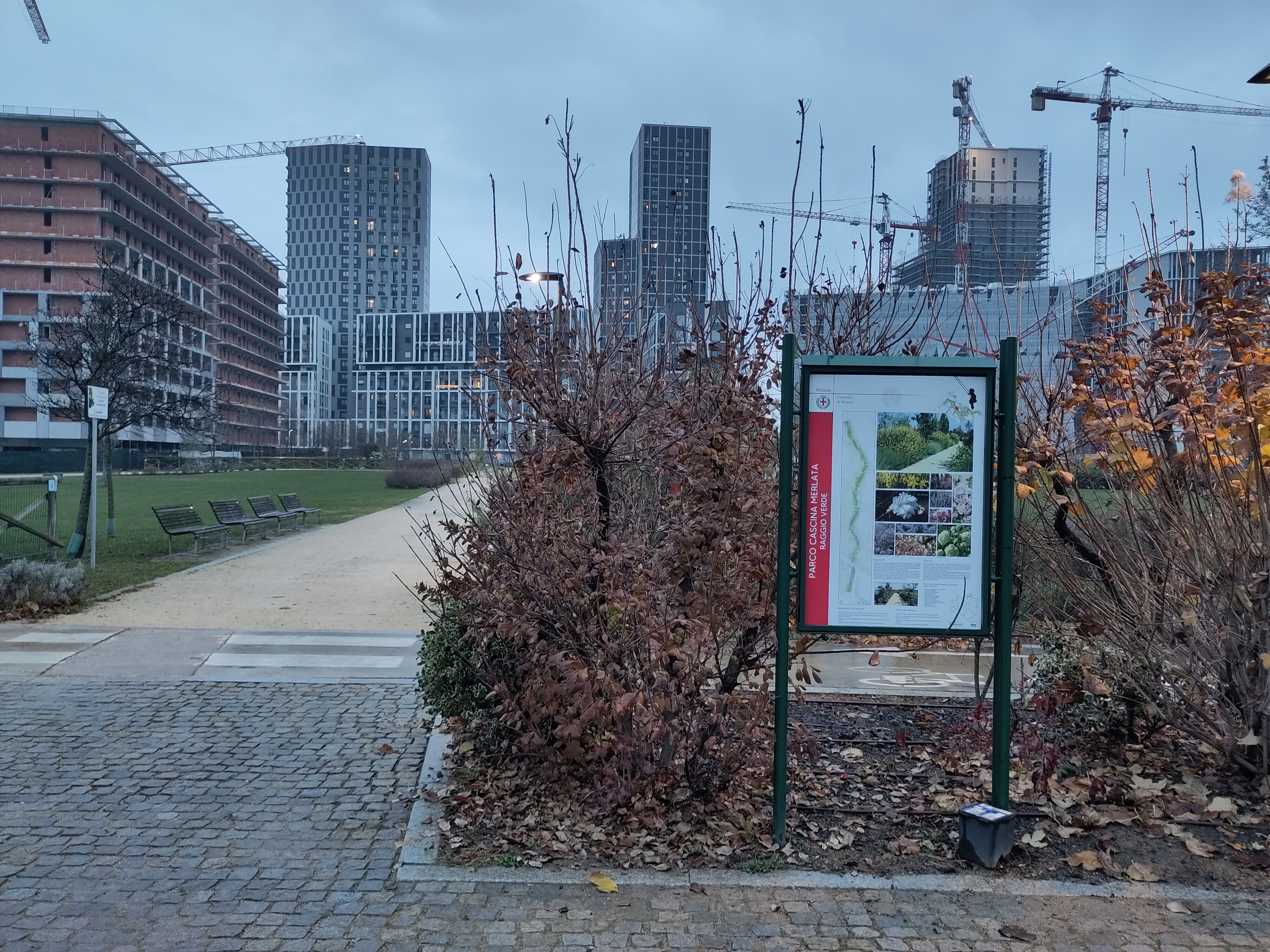
Cascina Merlata

== See also ==
- List of Tallest buildings in Italy
