= Centro Direzionale di Milano =

Coordinates: 45°29′04″N 9°11′49″E

- Quartiere of Milan
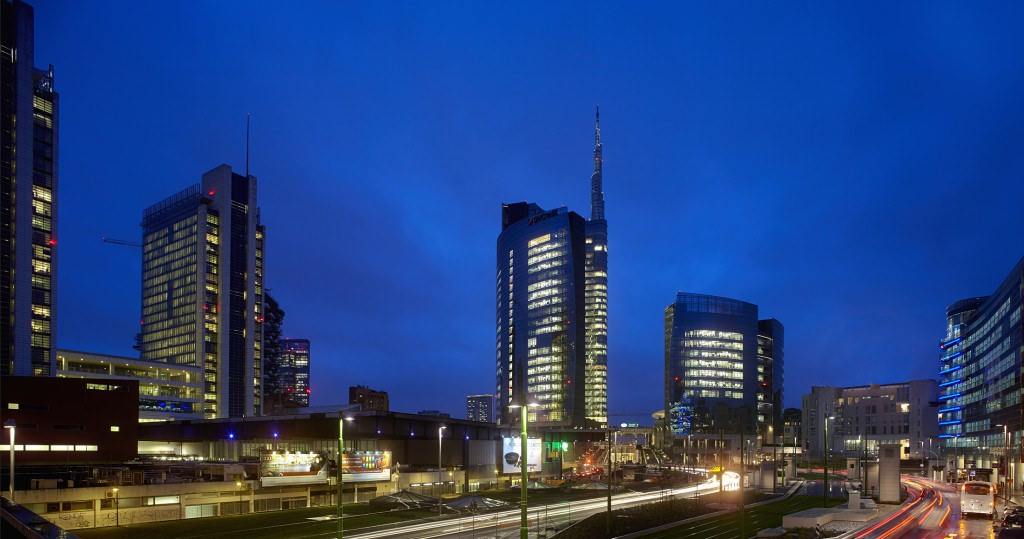
- Interactive map of Centro Direzionale di Milano
- Country: Italy
- Region: Lombardy
- Province: Milan
- Comune: Milan
- Zone: 9
- Time zone: UTC+1 (CET)
  - Summer (DST): UTC+2 (CEST)

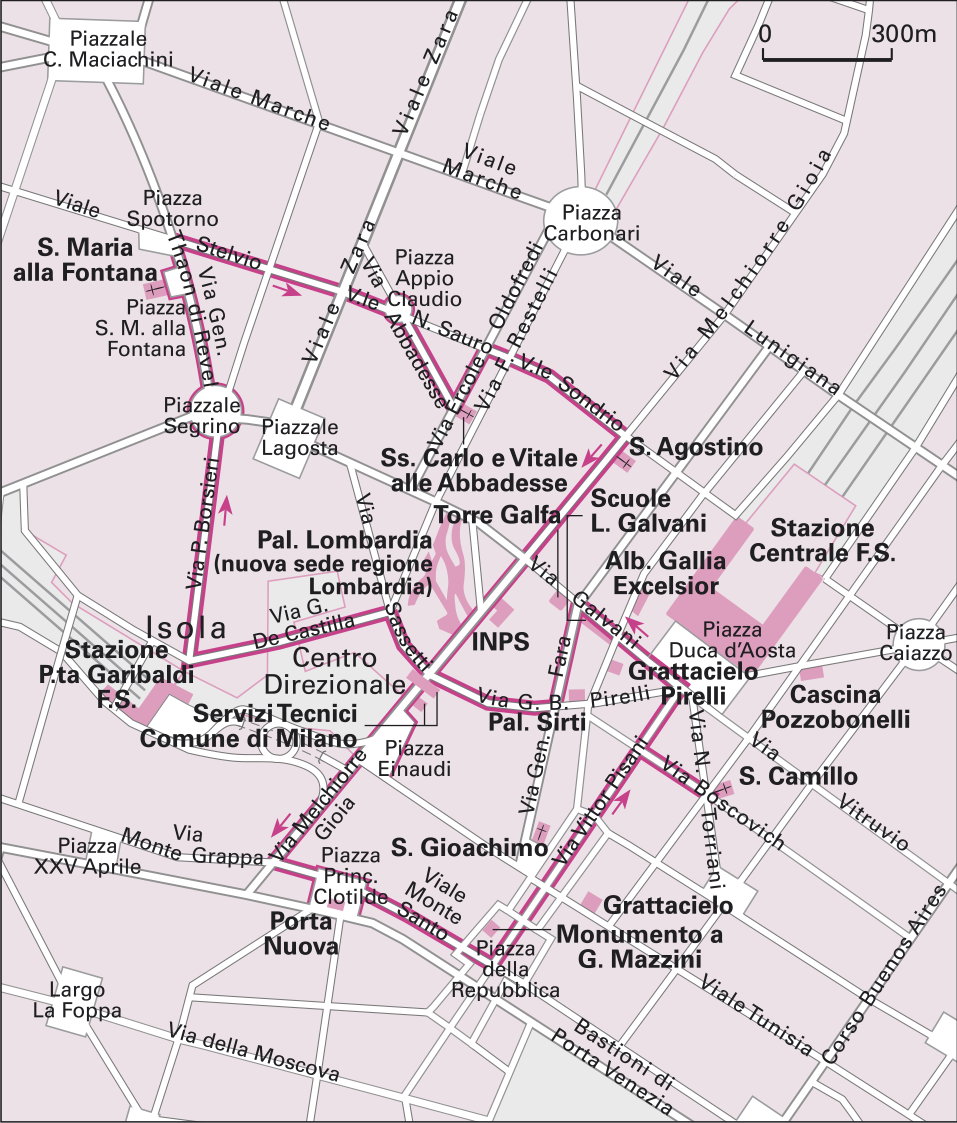
Map of business district

The Centro Direzionale di Milano is a business district (quartiere) in Milan, Italy, part of the Zone 9 administrative division. It is located north-west of the city centre, between the major railway stations of Milano Centrale and Milano Porta Garibaldi. The district developed in the second half of the 20th century; its realization was planned by the city administration to relieve congestion in the city centre by moving business and tertiary activities in the new area. Coherently with this plan, the district is mainly occupied by modern office buildings, including several of Milan's skyscrapers.

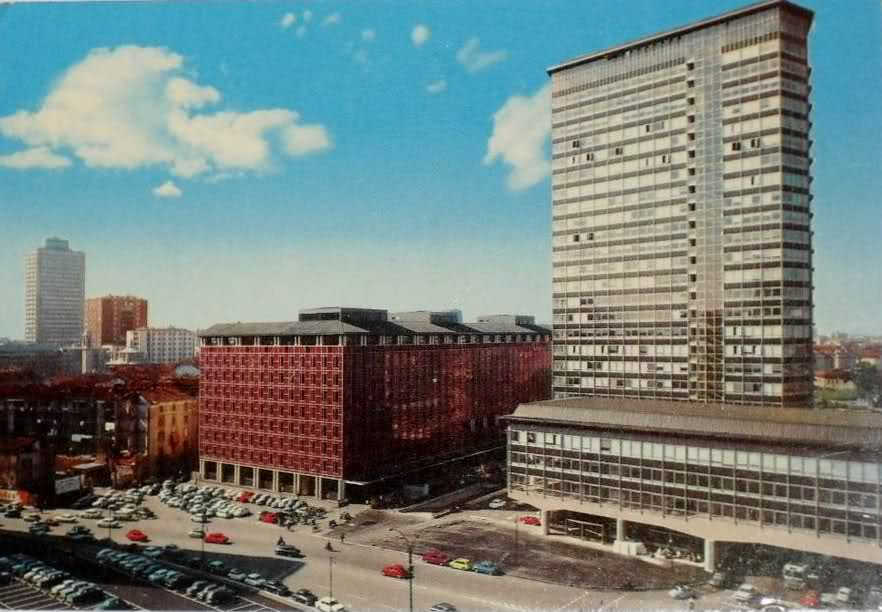
Milano Centro Direzionale in the 60s

== History ==
The district was originally designed to accommodate office buildings for tertiary activities. A relevant part of the design effort focused on the realization of adequate infrastructures supporting heavy daily commute, although only some of the corresponding projects were actually implemented. The main transportation hub in the area is Porta Garibaldi railway station, with connection to the Milan Metro, the suburban network and national rail lines.

Overall, the realization of the new district took place between 1955 and 1962, but was later suspended as a consequence of the lack of an actual regulation preventing tertiary activities to be established in the city centre.

For several years thereafter, the Centro Direzionale remained an heterogeneous and sparse area. Some skyscrapers were built (including the Pirelli Tower, the Galfa Tower, and the Servizi Tecnici Comunali Tower) but other areas remained undeveloped and fell in decay. A major example of the inconsistent use of urban areas in the district was the establishment of the Varesine "Luna Park" (now dismissed) amidst a supposedly office and financial district.

The development of the district was resumed in the early 21st century, when a completely new project was approved by the city authorities. Centro Direzionale is now a large working site, with several urban renewal works in progress. These include the realization of a large shopping mall devoted to fashion (nicknamed 'Città della Moda', Fashion City), residential blocks, new skyscrapers, and a large city park.

== Transport ==
The main transportation linksto the area are a series of both mainline and Passante railway stations, together with metro stations:

- National rail lines: Milano Porta Garibaldi railway station and Milano Centrale railway station
- Milan Metro: Garibaldi FS (M2 and M5), Repubblica (M3), Gioia (M2) and Centrale FS (M2 and M3)
- Suburban network: Milano Repubblica and Milano Porta Garibaldi

== Complex ==
Name	Height (m)	Floors	Year
UniCredit Tower A	231	31	2009 - 2011
Palazzo Lombardia	161	39	2007 - 2010
Torre Solaria	143	37	2010 - 2013
Torre Diamante	140	30	2010 - 2012
Grattacielo Pirelli	127	31	1956 - 1960 - R2005
Gioia 22	121	25	2019 - 2021
UnipolSai Tower	120	23	2019 - 2023
Torre Breda	117	30	1950 - 1955 - R2009
Bosco Verticale	111	24	2009 - 2014
Torre Galfa	109	31	1956 - 1959 - R2018
UniCredit Tower B	100	23	2009 - 2011
Torre Garibaldi A	100	25	1984 - 1992 - R2011
Torre Garibaldi B	100	25	1984 - 1992 - R2012
