= Libeskind Tower =

Skyscraper in Milan

- Torre Libeskind (Italian)
- Interactive map of the Libeskind Tower area

General information
- Status: Completed
- Type: Mixed use
- Architectural style: Modern
- Location: Milan, Italy
- Construction started: 2016
- Opening: 2021

Height
- Roof: 175 m (574 ft)

Technical details
- Floor count: 28

Design and construction
- Architect: Studio Daniel Libeskind
- Structural engineer: Mauro Eugenio Giuliani - Redesco

Libeskind Tower or PwC Tower, also called Il Curvo (The Curved One in English), is a skyscraper completed in 2020 in the city of Milan as part of the CityLife development project. The tower reaches a height of 175 m (574 ft) with 28 floors, and a total floor area of about 76,000 square metres. It is the home for the Milan offices of PricewaterhouseCoopers. The project's designer and namesake is the Polish-American architect Daniel Libeskind.

== Description ==
The curve of the tower slopes toward its counterparts in the development, the Isozaki and Hadid towers and the Piazza Tre Torri below.

The Renaissance cupola is the basic principle behind Il Curvo's concept. It is reinterpreted through the concave movement of its elevation and it culminates in the crown, both distinctive elements of the project. The crown, a 40-meter-tall (130 ft) structure, not only contains the building’s maintenance, air conditioning, and rainwater recycling system but also doubles as both a viewing platform and an art gallery for the general public. The curved tower's facade is made of sustainable glass which reflects the public space below and vistas around.

== Gallery ==
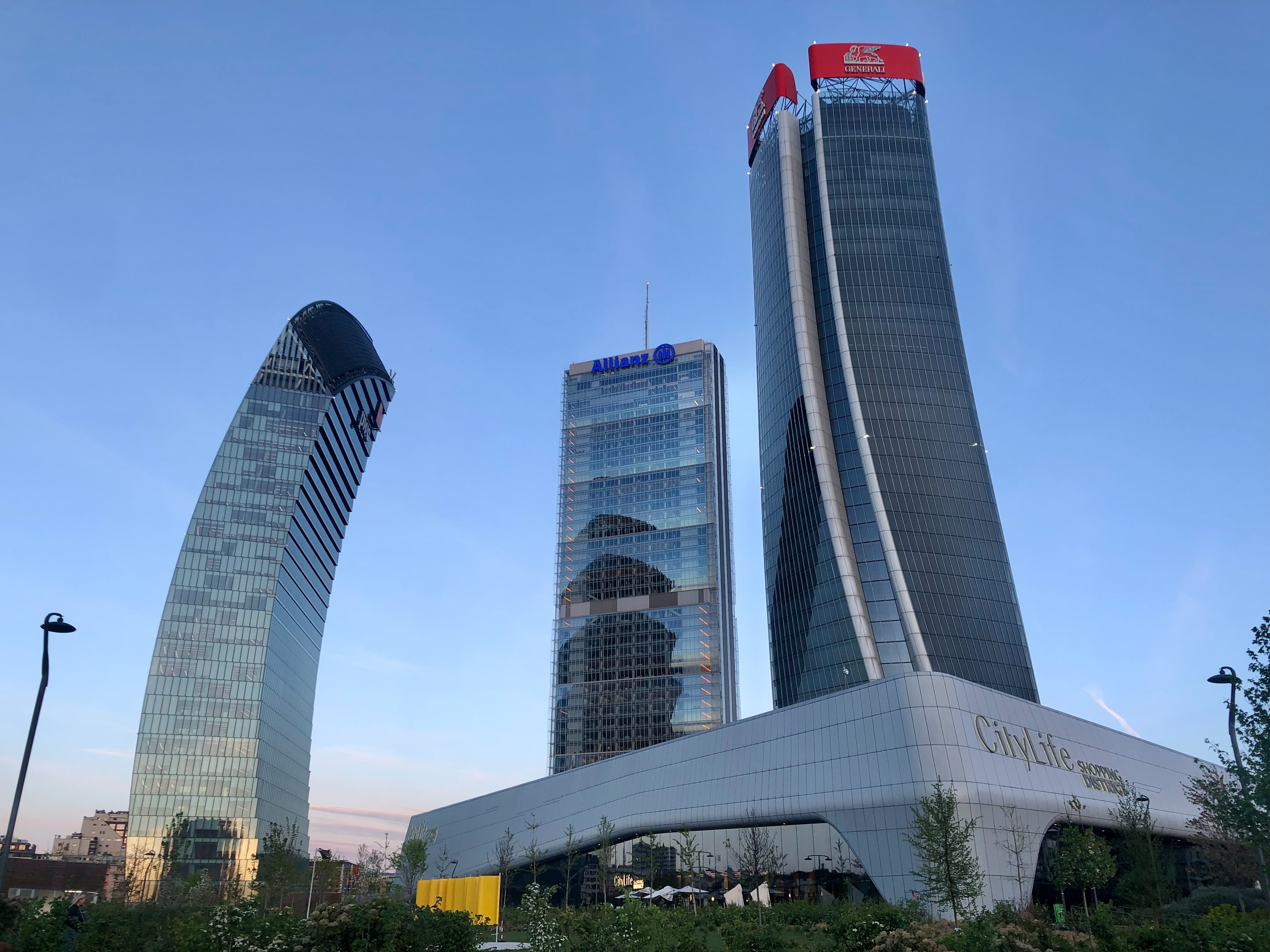

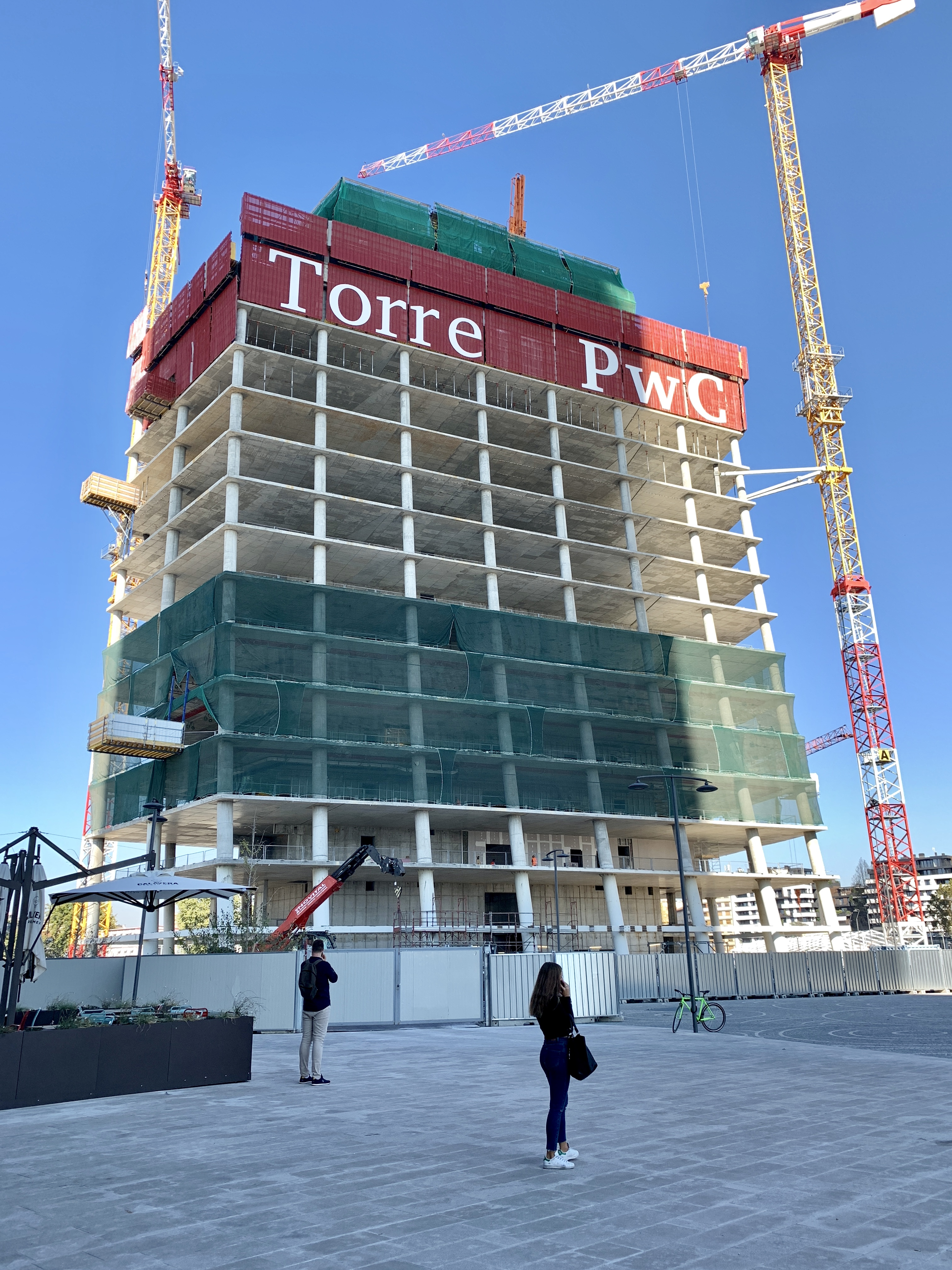

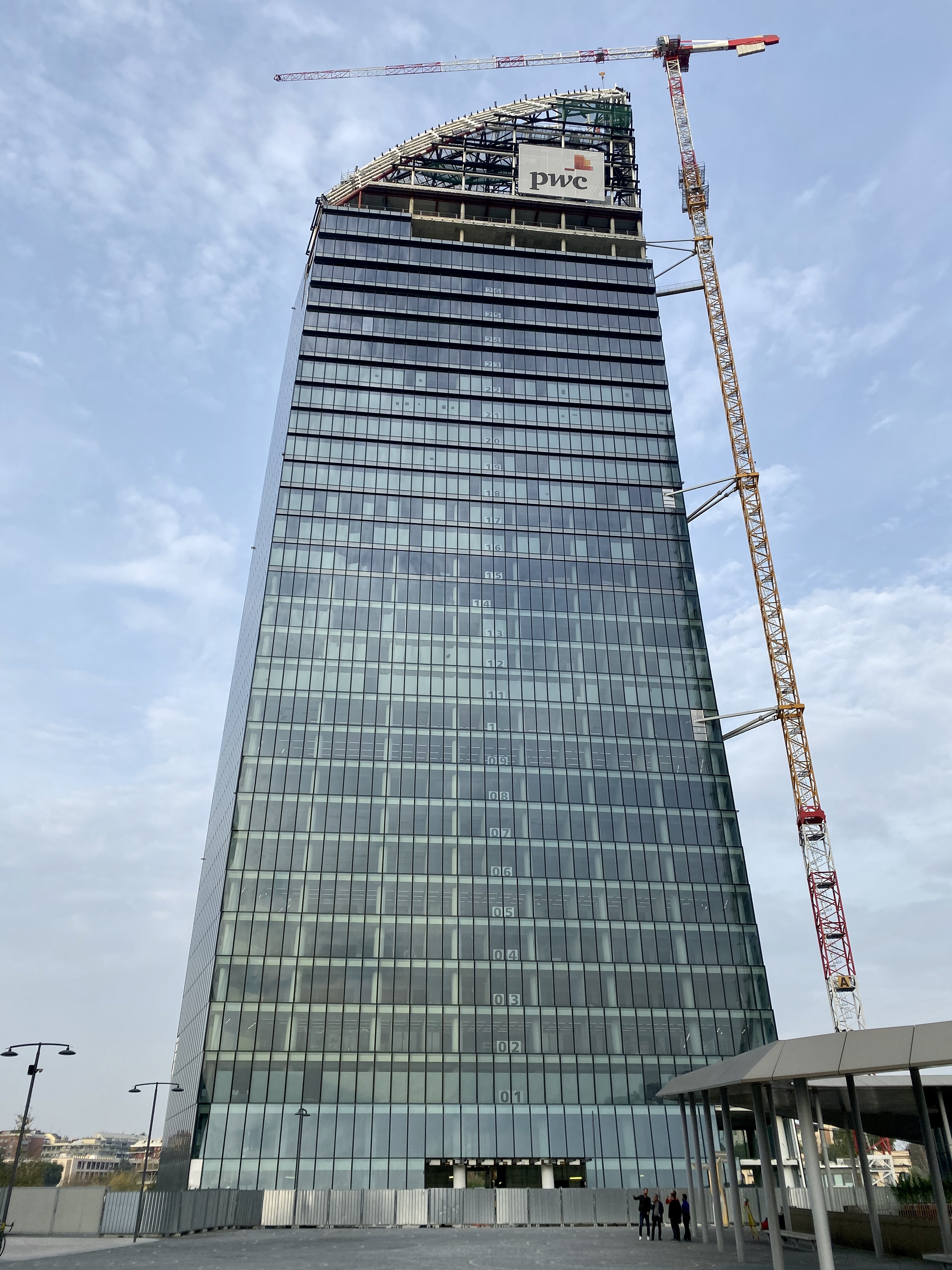

== See also ==
- List of tallest buildings in Milan
- List of tallest buildings in Italy
