= Garibaldi Towers =

Milan towers

- Torri Garibaldi (Italian)
- Garibaldi Towers in 2012
- Interactive map of the Garibaldi Towers area

General information
- Location: Milan, Italy
- Coordinates: 45°29′06.3″N 9°11′16.97″E
- Construction started: 1984
- Completed: 1992
- Renovated: 2012

Height
- Roof: 100 m (328 ft)

Technical details
- Floor count: 25

The Garibaldi Towers are two high-rise buildings in Milan. They are next to Porta Garibaldi railway station. They were built between 1984 and 1992 by the Italian state railways Ferrovie dello Stato to house its offices. The buildings are 100 meters tall with 25 floors.

== See also ==
- Porta Nuova (Milan)
- Centro Direzionale di Milano
- List of tallest buildings in Milan
