= Cascina Merlata =

Coordinates: 45°30′38″N 9°6′5″E

- Quartier of Milan
- Interactive map of Cascina Merlata
- Country: Italy
- Region: Lombardy
- Metropolitan City: Milan
- Comune: Milan
- Zone: 8
- Time zone: UTC+1 (CET)
  - Summer (DST): UTC+2 (CEST)

Cascina Merlata is a district ("quartiere") of Milan, Italy, part of the Zone 8 administrative division of the city. It is adjacent to the Expo 2015 exhibition site and borders the districts of Roserio, Gallaratese and Musocco, as well as the municipality of Pero.

== Characteristics ==
Cascina Merlata covers an area of approximately 900,000 m² on which the construction of a large urban park of 300,000 m², a school complex of 12,000 m², a shopping center of 60,000 m², in addition to housing divided into several lots (52500 m² of social housing; 127000 m² under agreement; 143500 m² free housing).

=== Expo Village ===
The Expo Village, designed by EuroMilano SpA as part of the redevelopment plan of the Cascina Merlata area, consists of 7 residential towers designed by architects Cino Zucchi, C + S Associati, MCA di Mario Cucinella Architects, Teknoarch, B22 and Pura. The works, which began in June 2013, ended in March 2015. During Expo 2015, they were intended to welcome the representatives of the international delegations and the staff of the countries participating in the Universal Exposition. At the end of the Universal Exposition, from July 2016, a further 4 buildings with 293 accommodations were built alongside the first 7 towers intended for the Expo Village. Once completed, it became the largest social housing settlement in Italy with a total of 690 homes and the first entirely zero-emission neighborhood.
