= I Portali =

Skyscraper in Milan, Italy

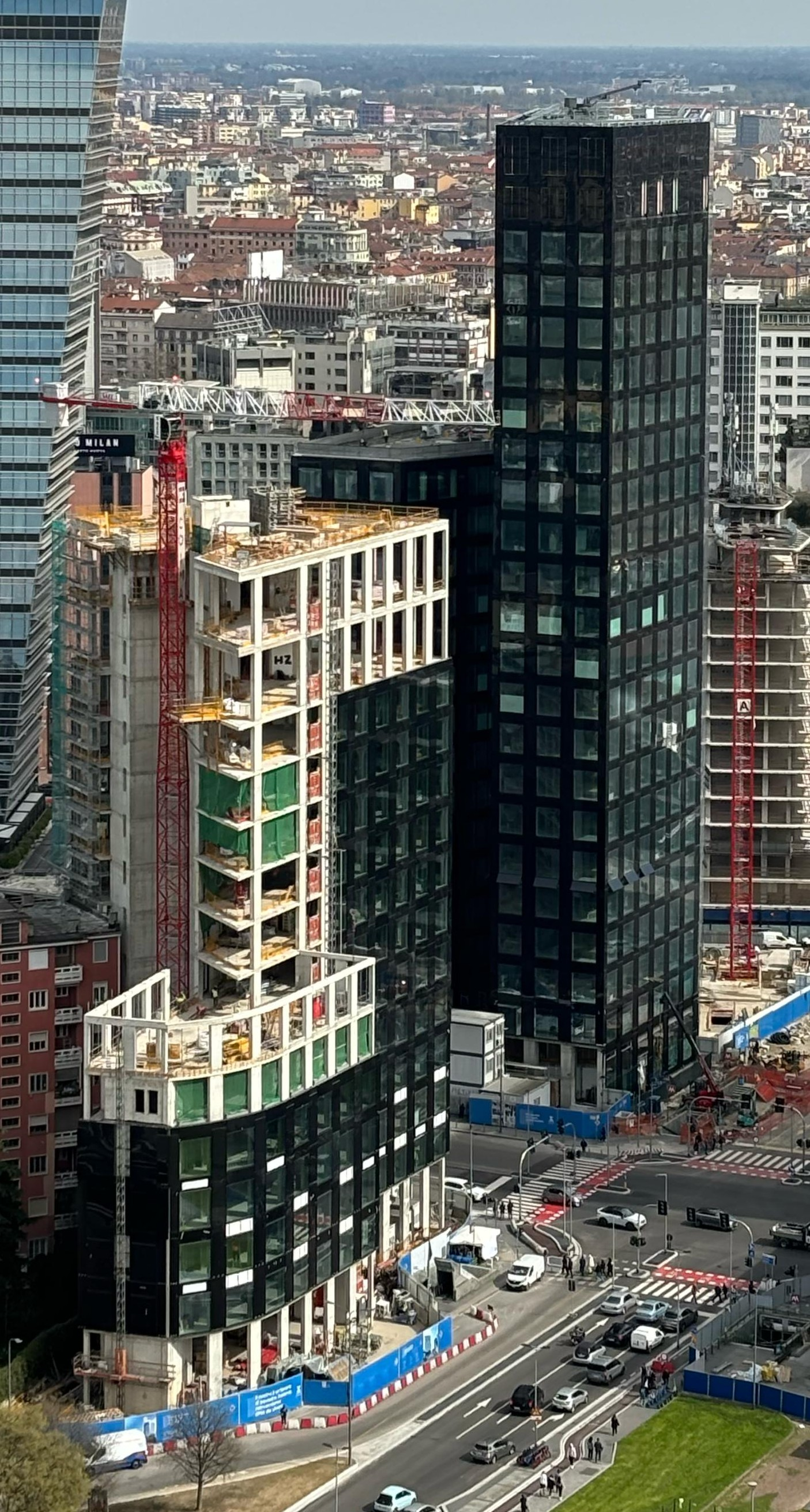
- Construction in March 2025
- Interactive map of the I Portali area

General information
- Location: Milan, Italy
- Coordinates: 45°29′04.81″N 9°11′46.23″E

Height
- Roof: 104 m (341 ft)

Technical details
- Floor count: 24

I Portali is an office skyscraper complex in Milan, Italy, which is currently under construction.

== History ==
The complex was developed by COIMA and designed by Antonio Citterio and Patricia Viel's architecture firm. In July 2022, it was announced that the tallest tower would be leased to auditing and consulting firm KPMG becoming its new headquarters in Milan.

== Description ==
The complex is made up by two buildings, the tallest of which is 104 metres (341 ft) and 24-story tall. The body of this tower consists of two main volumes of different heights, maintaining their shape unchanged throughout the vertical development. These volumes are arranged perpendicularly to Via Melchiorre Gioia.

The building will feature the first elevators in Italy with two independent cabins in the same shaft, allowing for improved waiting times and more efficient use of interior space.
