= Porta Romana Tower =

- Torre di Porta Romana (Italian)
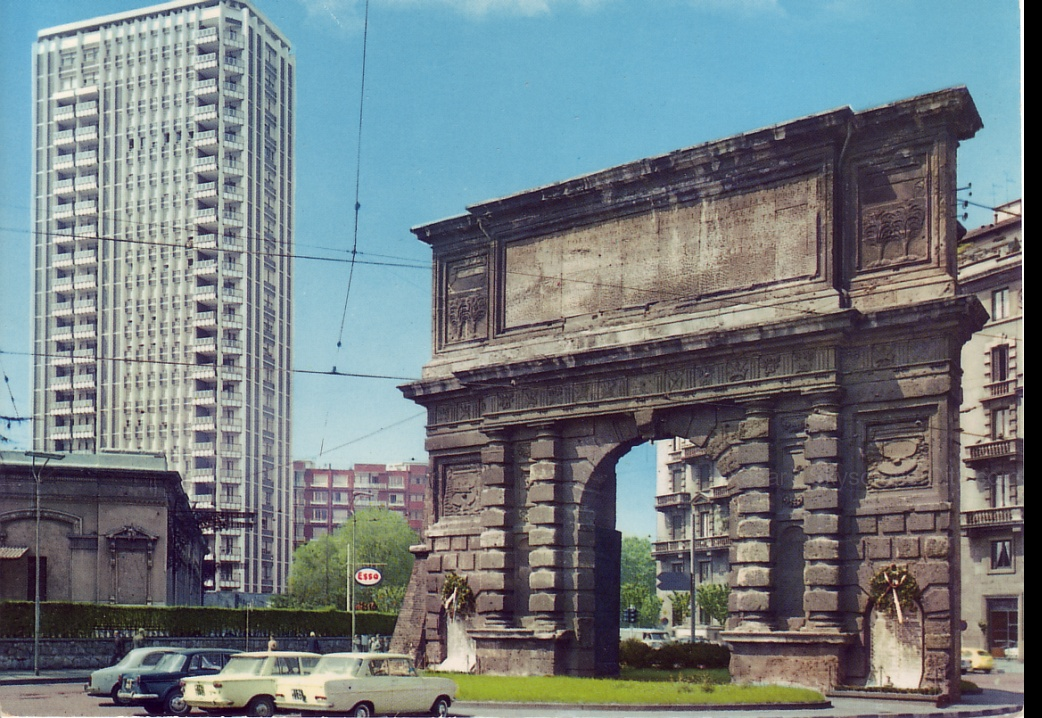
- Porta Romana Tower in the 1960s
- Interactive map of the Porta Romana Tower area

General information
- Type: Residential
- Location: Milan, Italy
- Coordinates: 45.4515°N 9.2009°E
- Construction started: 1962
- Opening: 1965

Height
- Height: 89 m (292 ft)

Porta Romana Tower (Italian: Torre di Porta Romana) is a skyscraper in Milan, Italy.

== History ==
Construction of the building, designed by architect Paolo Chiolini, started in 1962 and was completed in 1965.

== Description ==
Standing at a height of 89 meters and 25 floors, the skyscraper serves as a residential building.

It takes its name from its location near the ancient Porta Romana city gate along the Bastioni of Milan in Piazzale Medaglie d'Oro.
