= Unipol Tower, Milan =

Skyscraper in Milan, Italy

Unipol Tower
- Torre Unipol (Italian)
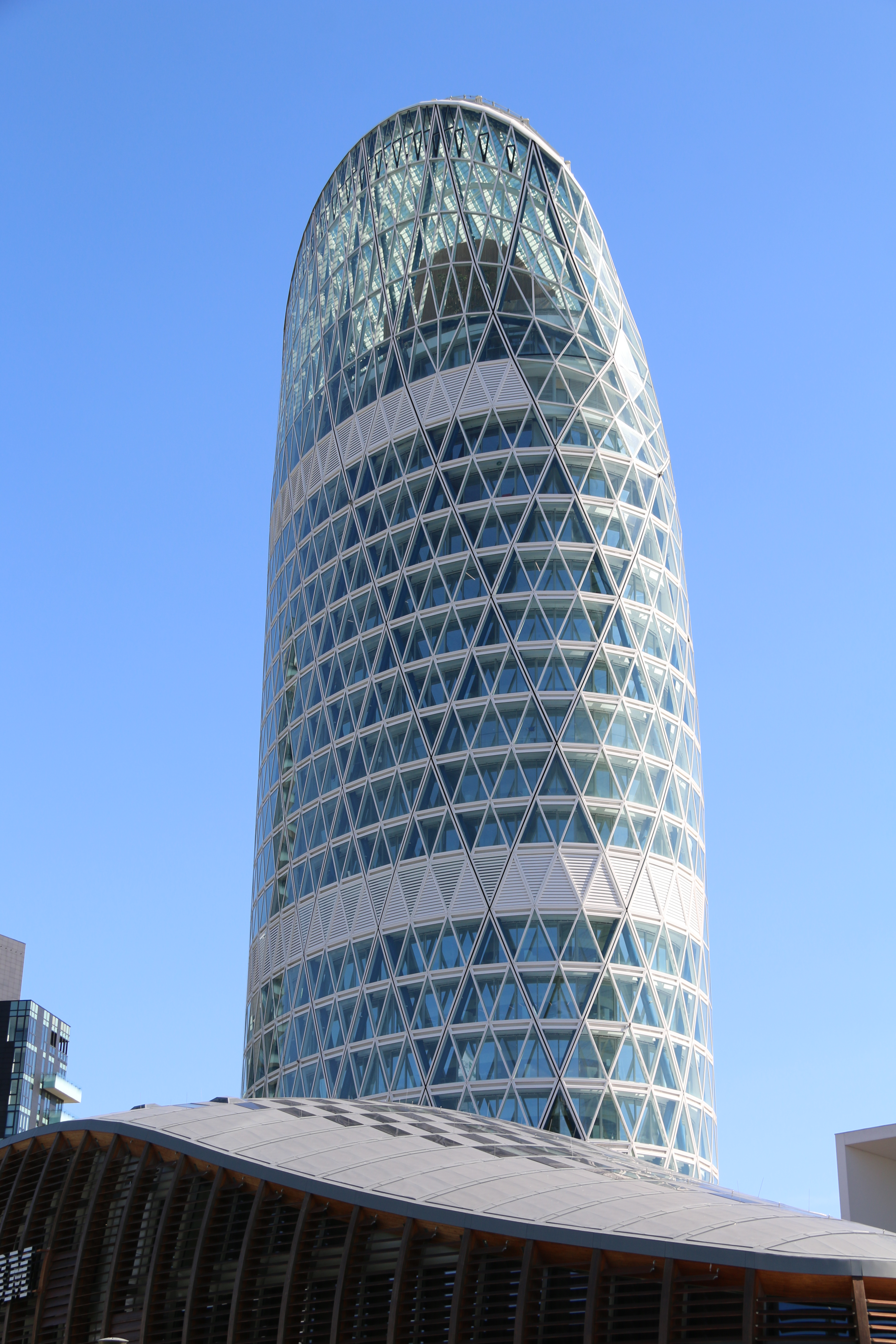
- Interactive map of the Unipol Tower area

General information
- Type: Office
- Location: Milan, Italy
- Coordinates: 45°28′57.52″N 9°11′30.68″E
- Construction started: 2017
- Completed: 2023
- Owner: Unipol

Height
- Roof: 125 m (410 ft)

Technical details
- Floor count: 23

Design and construction
- Architect: Mario Cucinella Architects
- Structural engineer: MJW Structures
- Main contractor: CMB Carpi

The Unipol Tower (Italian: Torre Unipol) also known as the Unipol Sai Tower is an office skyscraper in Milan, Italy. Built between 2017 and 2023, the tower stands at 125 m (410 ft) tall with 23 floors and is the current 10th tallest building in Milan.

== History ==
=== Architecture ===
The building is located in the Porta Nuova district at the crossroads between Via Melchiorre Gioia and Via Fratelli Castiglioni, where the Hotel Gilli was once supposed to be built. The works began in 2017 with the piling of the foundations. The laying of the first stone took place in spring 2019. The completion of the tower is expected within the first half of 2024.

=== Construction ===
The tower comprises 23 floors above ground and 3 underground floors, a total surface area of 33,000 m^{2} and an overall height of 125 metres.

The skyscraper has an X-structure covering, which resembles a nest; the materials used for the construction are glass and steel. The work is completed by an auditorium with 190 seats and on the roof a panoramic greenhouse-garden. The covering of the steel structure is made by the Treviso-based company Maeg Costruzioni.

The building was designed to maximize energy efficiency thanks to the presence, along the external walls, of a double cavity that mitigates the summer heat and insulates from the winter cold. There are also solar panels for the production of electricity. On the terraces along the external perimeters and on the terrace at the top of the building there are winter gardens that help regulate the internal temperature of the building by reducing the need for artificial ventilation systems near the atrium. The panoramic terrace located at the top of the building will also be used to host cultural events, such as exhibitions.

== Gallery ==
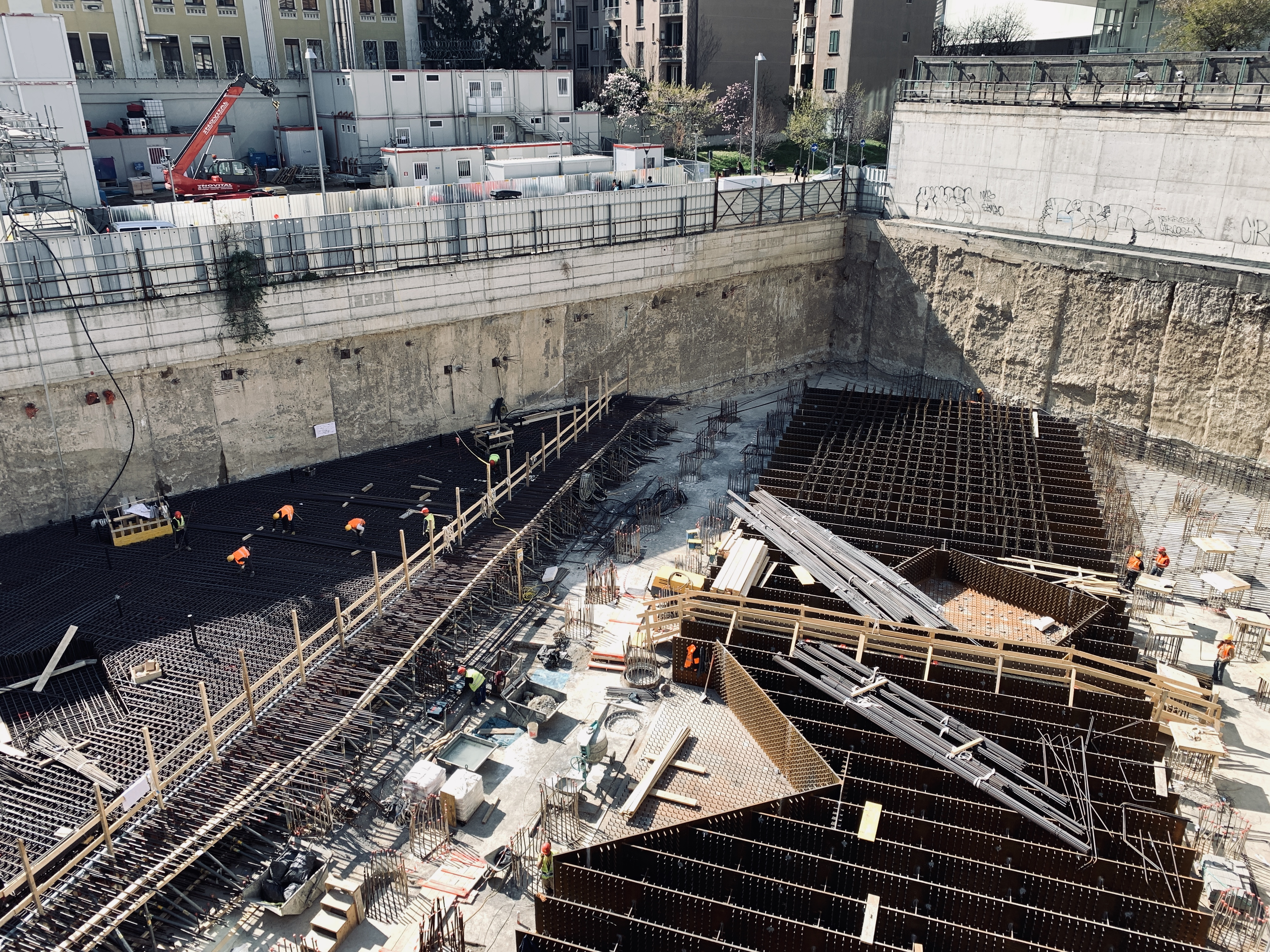
UnipolSai Tower construction site in March 2019

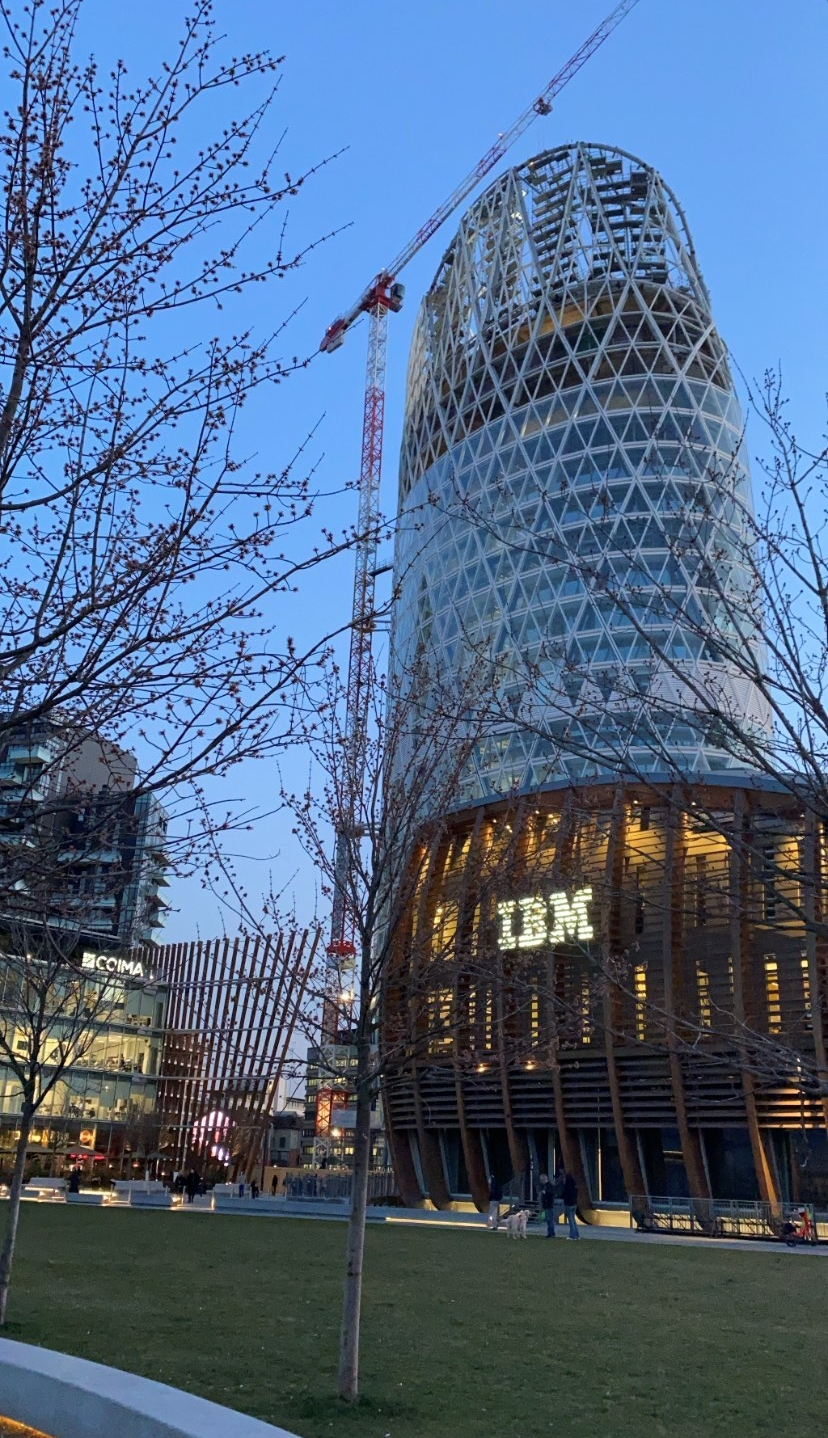
The tower shortly before its completion in 2023

== See also ==
- List of tallest buildings in Italy
- List of tallest buildings in Milan
