= Galfa Tower =

- Torre Galfa (Italian)
- The Galfa Tower in 2024

- Location within Italy

General information
- Type: Office
- Location: Milan, Italy
- Coordinates: 45°29′11″N 9°11′56″E
- Construction started: 1956
- Completed: 1959
- Renovated: 2019
- Owner: UnipolSai Insurance (Unipol Group)

Height
- Roof: 109 m (358 ft)
- Top floor: 31

Technical details
- Floor area: 27,000 m^{2} (290,000 sq ft)
- Lifts/elevators: 7

Design and construction
- Architect: Melchiorre Bega
- Main contractor: Sarom

The Galfa Building or Galfa Tower (Torre Galfa in Italian) is a skyscraper in Milan, Italy, located in the Centro Direzionale di Milano district, north of the city centre. It was designed by architect Melchiorre Bega in 1956 and completed in 1959. The name "Galfa" is a portmanteau derived from the names of the two streets where the tower has its facades, Via Galvani and Via Fara. The building is 109 m and 31 floors high, with 2 more underground floors, and qualifies as the eleventh highest skyscraper in Milan.

The overall design of the tower is mainly based on the International Style architecture. The building is rectangular, with the two lowest floors larger than the main body. The main structure in reinforced concrete is almost completely hidden by curtain walls made of glass and aluminium.

The tower was originally built for the Sarom company; in the mid-1970s, it was sold by Sarom to the Popolare di Milano bank, and thereafter served as a service centre and headquarter of the bank. In 2006, Popolare sold the building for 48 million euros to Fondiaria Sai Group.

On 5 May 2012, the building was occupied by a group of people which intended to create a space for artists; the project's name was Macao. The building was cleared by the authorities ten days later; anyway, project Macao remained, and Mayor Giuliano Pisapia promised to provide it another seat.

After acquiring Fondiaria-Sai in 2012, the insurance group Unipol Group took possession of the building and began discussions with the Milan city council as to its eventual renovation. Work began in 2016, led by the design firm, Studio BG&K. In an interview with the Italian design magazine Abitare, Maurice Kanah, lead architect on the project, said that the refurbished building will contain "a mix of residential, hotel and commercial functions.”
