= UniCredit Tower =

Skyscraper in Milan, Italy

- Torre UniCredit (Italian)
- UniCredit tower from "Passerella Gioia" bridge

General information
- Type: Office
- Location: Milan, Italy
- Coordinates: 45.483845°N 9.189879°E
- Construction started: 2009
- Completed: 2011
- Opened: 2012
- Owner: UniCredit

Height
- Antenna spire: 238 m (781 ft)
- Roof: 158 m (518 ft)

Technical details
- Floor count: 33 (tallest of the three towers)
- Floor area: 26,708 m^{2} (287,480 sq ft)

Design and construction
- Architect: César Pelli
- Architecture firm: Pelli Clarke Pelli, Adamson Associates Architects (as executive architect)
- Developer: Hines Italia

Website
- unicredit-tower.html

The UniCredit Tower (Italian: Torre UniCredit) is an office skyscraper in Milan, Italy. The building's spire increases its height to 238 metres (781 ft), making it the tallest building in Italy, although the Allianz Tower, at 210 m (690 ft), ranks the tallest by roof height. The building is the headquarters of UniCredit, Italy's largest bank by assets, and is part of a larger development of new residential and business structures in Milan's Porta Nuova district, near Porta Garibaldi railway station, located at Piazza Gae Aulenti.

== History ==
The building was designed by architect César Pelli and reached its full height on 15 October 2011 when the spire was attached. It was developed by Hines Italy and COIMA. In 2015, COIMA acquired Hines's shares in the asset management company managing the building, and since then, the building has been part of COIMA's portfolio.

== Architecture and design ==
The tower ranked eighth in the Emporis 2012, that rewards skyscrapers for excellence in their aesthetic and functional design.

=== Spire ===
The spire has a height of around 80.5 metres and is entirely covered with LED lights, with the spire also having continuous night lighting. The colours can be varied according to event. For example, during the Christmas season of 2013 it was lit up green to represent a Christmas tree, while on the night between 14 and 15 June 2014 it was illuminated in red to celebrate the 150 year anniversary of the Italian Red Cross. One of the usual displays is that of the Italian flag. On the evening of 14 November 2015, the spire was illuminated with the colors of the French flag to represent Italy's condolences for the victims of the attack at Stade de France and at the Bataclan theatre in Paris, which had occurred the night before. On 13 June 2016, the tower was lit up with the colours of the rainbow flag in acknowledgement of the 49 victims of the Orlando nightclub shooting in Florida.

== Gallery ==
Ground-level view of UniCredit Tower

The spire at night

UniCredit Tower complex, consisting of 3 towers.

Aerial View (taken in 2014)

Unicredit Tower seen from Centro Direzionale di Milano.

Via Maurizio Quadrio & UniCredit Tower

== See also ==
- List of tallest buildings in Italy
- List of tallest buildings in Milan
- List of tallest buildings in Europe
- Porta Nuova (Milan)
- Piazza Gae Aulenti
