= Snia Viscosa Tower =

- Torre Snia Viscosa (Italian)
- Snia Viscosa Tower in Milan
- Interactive map of the Snia Viscosa Tower area

General information
- Location: Milan, Italy
- Coordinates: 45°28′01″N 9°11′50″E
- Construction started: 1935
- Completed: 1937

Height
- Roof: 60 m (197 ft)

Technical details
- Floor count: 15

Design and construction
- Architect: Alessandro Rimini

The Snia Viscosa Tower (Italian: Torre Snia Viscosa) is a skyscraper in Milan, Italy.

== History ==
The building, commissioned by the Italian chemical company Snia Viscosa, was designed by Italian architect Alessandro Rimini. Construction works began in 1935 and were completed in 1937. The building followed the new planning regulations for the city of Milan introduced by Cesare Albertini that sought to transform and renew the area around Piazza San Babila. The tower was the first skyscraper in Milan and its tallest for 14 years.

== Description ==
The building is 60 metres (200 ft) and 15 floor tall.
