= Torre Diamante =

Coordinates: 45°28′51.796″N 9°11′46.495″E

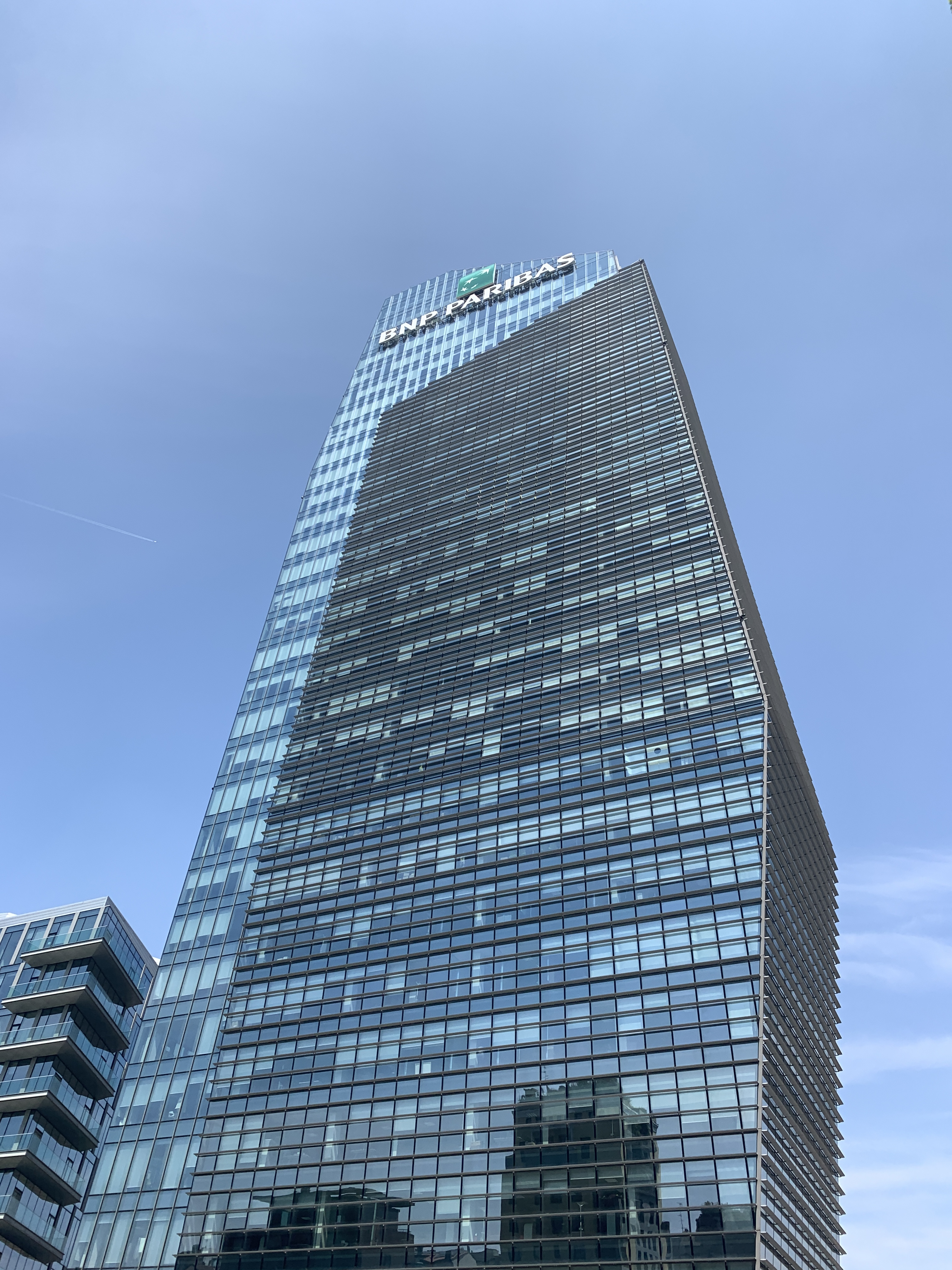
- Interactive map of the Torre Diamante area

General information
- Status: Completed
- Type: Office
- Construction started: 2010
- Completed: 2012

Height
- Roof: 140 metres (459 ft)

Technical details
- Floor count: 30 + 4 underground floors

Design and construction
- Architect: Kohn Pedersen Fox
- Structural engineer: Arup

The Diamond Tower (in Italian Torre Diamante or colloquially Diamantone) is an office high-rise building in Milan business district, on the corner between Viale Della Liberazione and Via Galilei. It was built in the context of a massive urban renewal project carried out at the start of the 21st century.

The tower is 140 meters tall, making it the fourth building in Milan by height and the fifth in Italy and the tallest steel edifice in Italy. It features an iconic multifaceted structure, which recalls the shape of a diamond (from which, indeed, derives its name).

The building is surrounded by some lower constructions, nicknamed Diamantini (the small diamonds), functioning as continuities of the high-rise. All the facilities are intended for commercial purposes.

The principal tenant is BNP Paribas bank since 2016.

== Design ==
The Italian-American architect Lee Polisano, member of Kohn Pedersen Fox studio, designed the entire area master plan. Polisano was supported by architect Paolo Caputo and by Jacobs Engineering Group Inc. for the architectural design while the structural plan was committed to Arup.

The main feature of the tower is its irregular geometry: the perimeter columns of the building are inclined compared to the vertical. The inner layout is characterised by a central core around which the floors develop. This solution has been adopted to maximise the amount of sunlight passing through the building and to allow a view on the city.

One of the goals of the "Porta Nuova" project is to drastically reduce energy consumption: all the buildings will be provided with sources of renewable energy. The Diamond Tower has in fact been awarded with the LEED GOLD certification, one of the highest ranking recognised by the Green Building Council.

== Construction ==
The construction of the building officially began on 28 January 2010 with the assembly of the cranes. On 1 August the installation of the external structure and the inner concrete core started. After about nine months, the tower had reached six floors. At the beginning of the new year, it rose to ten floors and the installation of the glass panels began. The construction continued quickly and, in March, it arrived at eighteen floors.

On 5 June, the inner concrete core reached the maximum height of the building (140m) and on the top the Italian flag was placed. After about 5 months, in November 2011, the external steel structure had reached the maximum height while the laying of the glass panels arrived at the eighth floor. On 10 February, the glass panels reached eighteen floors, on 30 March the twenty-two and in mid-April the twenty-seven. During the rest of April, the laying of the panels continued in order to complete the installation by the end of the month. The tower was completed on 14 September 2012.

A characteristic of the tower is the use of laminated glass instead of tempered glass in order to have a façade uniformity and to avoid minor flaws such as the undulation typical of industrial tempered glass.
Another peculiarity of the building is the lighting of its top in various colours, e.g. blue or red.

== See also ==
- List of tallest buildings in Milan
- List of tallest buildings in Italy
