= Gioia 22 Tower =

Skyscraper in Milan, Italy

- Torre Gioia 22 (Italian)
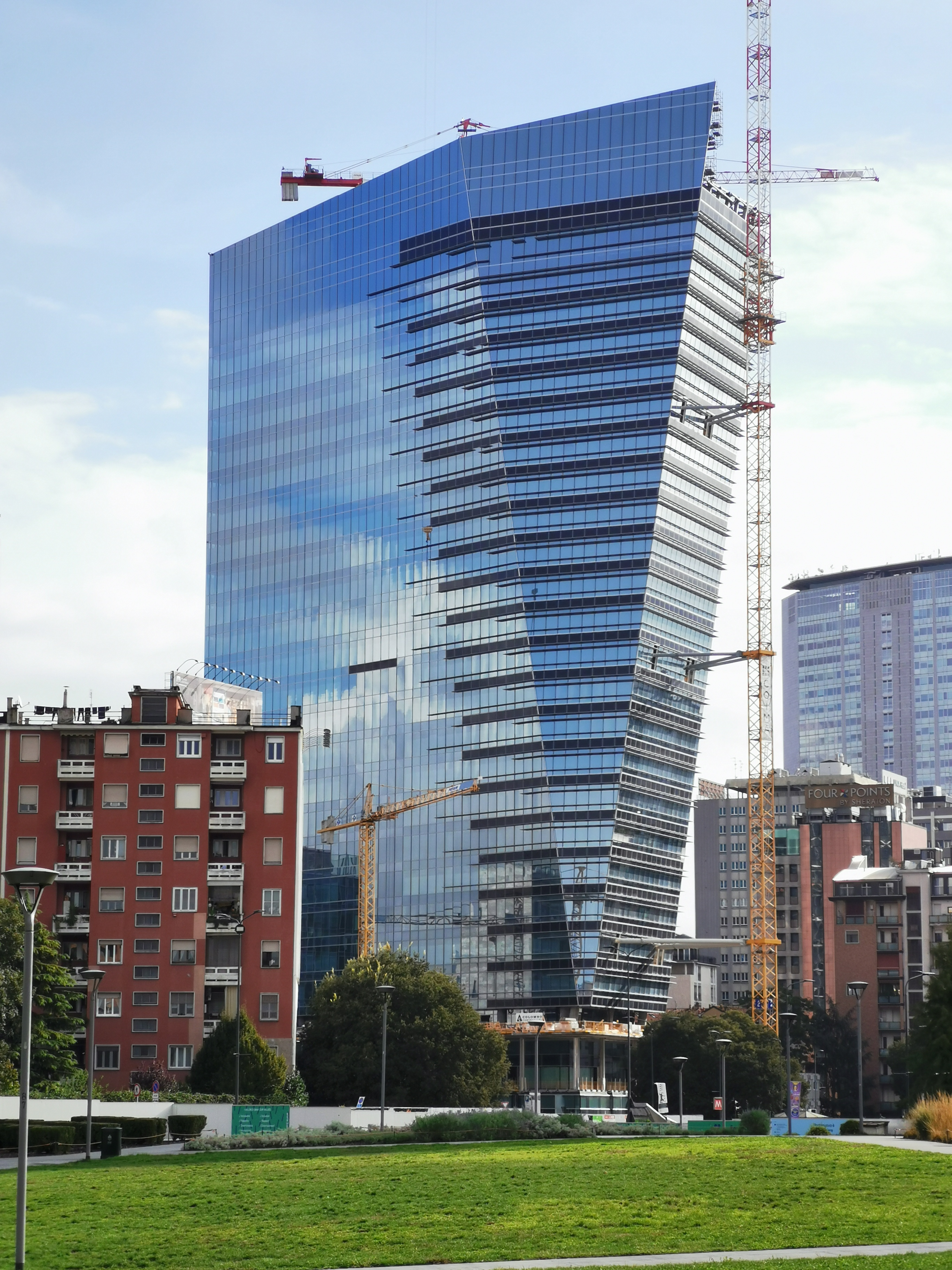
- Gioia 22 Tower in Milan
- Interactive map of the Gioia 22 Tower area

General information
- Location: Milan, Italy
- Coordinates: 45°29′06.9″N 9°11′48.7″E
- Construction started: 2018
- Completed: 2021
- Cost: €150,000,000
- Owner: isybank (Intesa Sanpaolo)

Height
- Roof: 121.4 m (398 ft)

Technical details
- Floor count: 25

Design and construction
- Architects: Pelli Clarke & Partners
- Developer: COIMA
- Structural engineer: MSC Associati
- Main contractor: Colombo Costruzioni

The Gioia 22 Tower (Italian: Torre Gioia 22) is an office skyscraper in Milan, Italy. Built between 2018 and 2021, the tower stands at 121.4 m (398 ft) with 25 floors and is the current 9th tallest building in Milan.

== History ==
The project for the tower, designed by Gregg Jones from Pelli Clarke Pelli was presented on November 16, 2017. Construction works began in 2018 with the demolition of a 1960s building that had remained abandoned since 2012.

=== Architecture ===
The building is nicknamed a glass shard, is part of the Porta Nuova project. The skyscraper is 121.4 m (398 ft) tall ans is located along via Melchiorre Gioia in Milan. The building currently serves as the headquarters of the new isybank and of the three divisions Private (Fideuram - Intesa Sanpaolo Private Banking), Asset Management (Eurizon), Insurance (Intesa Sanpaolo Vita) and of the respective subsidiaries of Intesa Sanpaolo.

On 16 November 2017 COIMA SGR presented the construction project for the new office skyscraper. The first phase of the project consisted of the freeing up of the building land with the demolition of the former INPS building in Via Melchiorre Gioia 22 which took place on 22 March 2018. The building, unused since 2012, dated back to 1961, consisted of twenty-one floors, three of which were underground, and occupied a total surface area of 40,000 m². The remediation and removal phase of over 200 tons of asbestos that were present in the building then began.

The building consists of thirty floors (four of which are underground) for a total gross surface area of68 432 m² and on an elevation of 120 m. Torre Gioia 22 has obtained LEED certification thanks also to a Cradle to Cradle approach in the choice of materials. Furthermore, the tower has over 6,000 m² of photovoltaic panels that allow a reduction of three quarters of the energy requirement of the other Porta Nuova towers . The tower reduces carbon dioxide emissions by 2260 tonnes compared to the previous building. The building is designed to integrate cycle paths, pedestrian areas and green areas of the city. There will also be spaces open to the public and charging stations for electric vehicles.

== Gallery ==
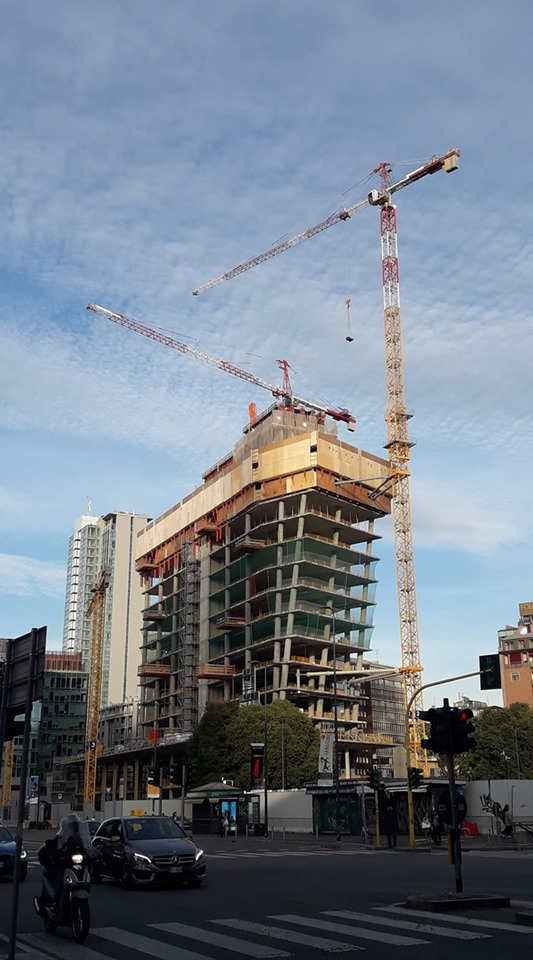
October 2019

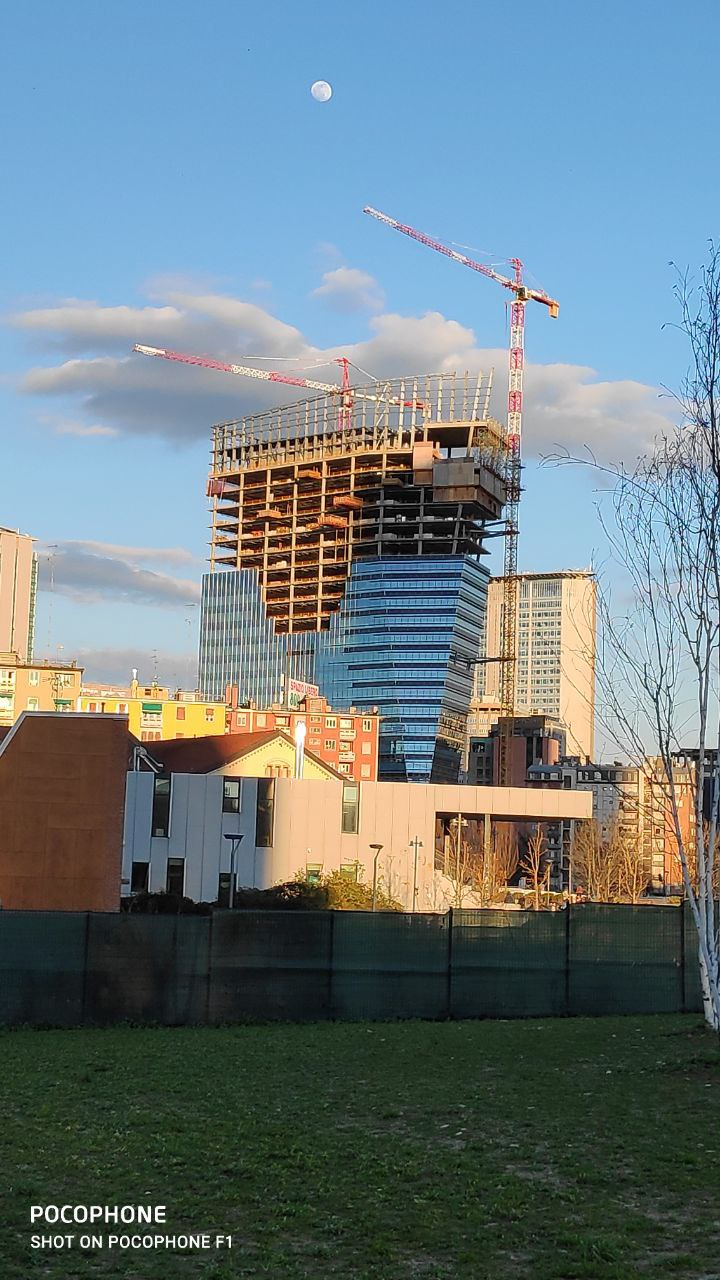
March 2020

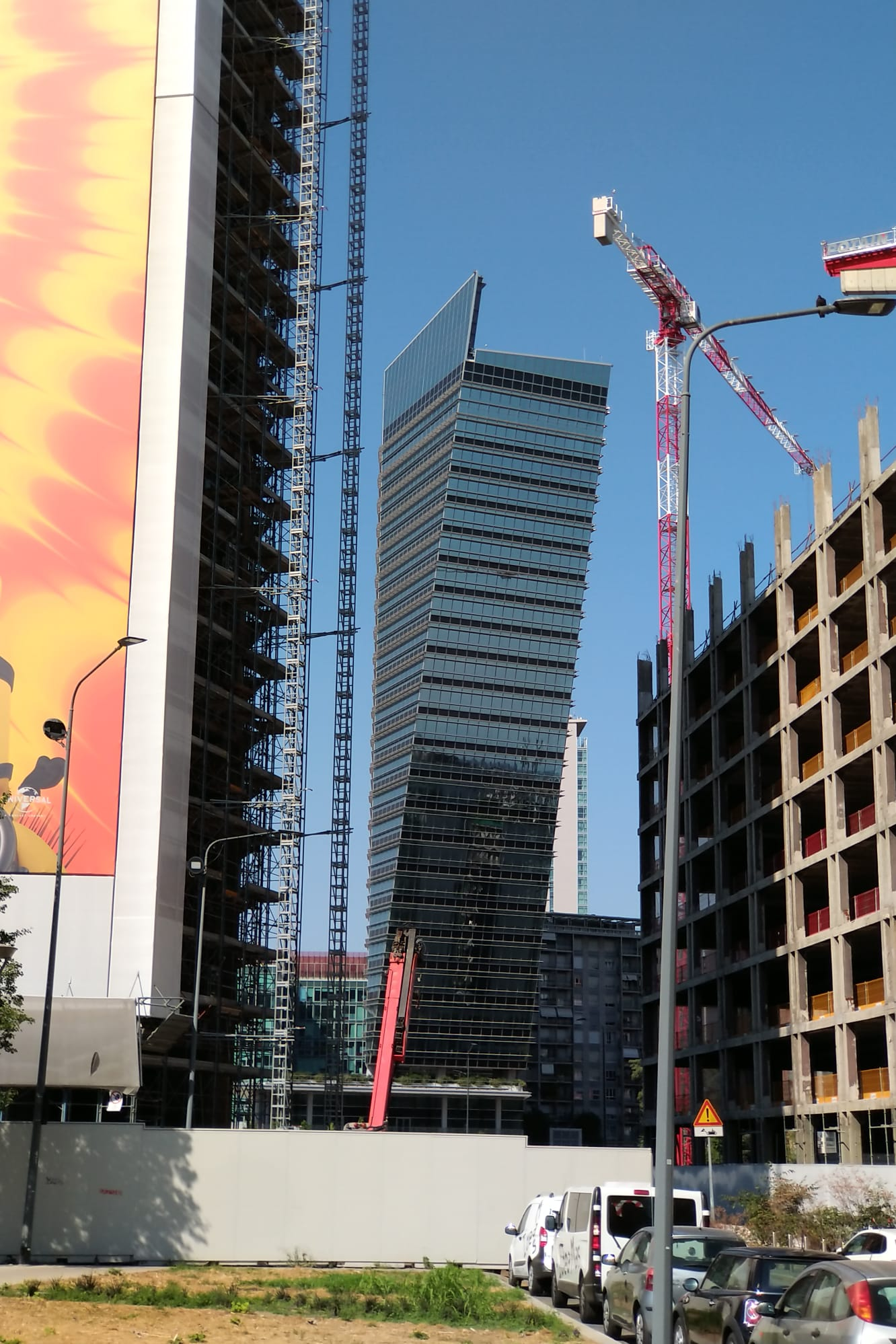
July 2022

== See also ==
- List of tallest buildings in Milan
- List of tallest buildings in Italy
