= Allianz Tower =

Skyscraper in Milan, Italy

Coordinates: 45.4776°N 9.1573°E

- Torre Allianz (Italian)
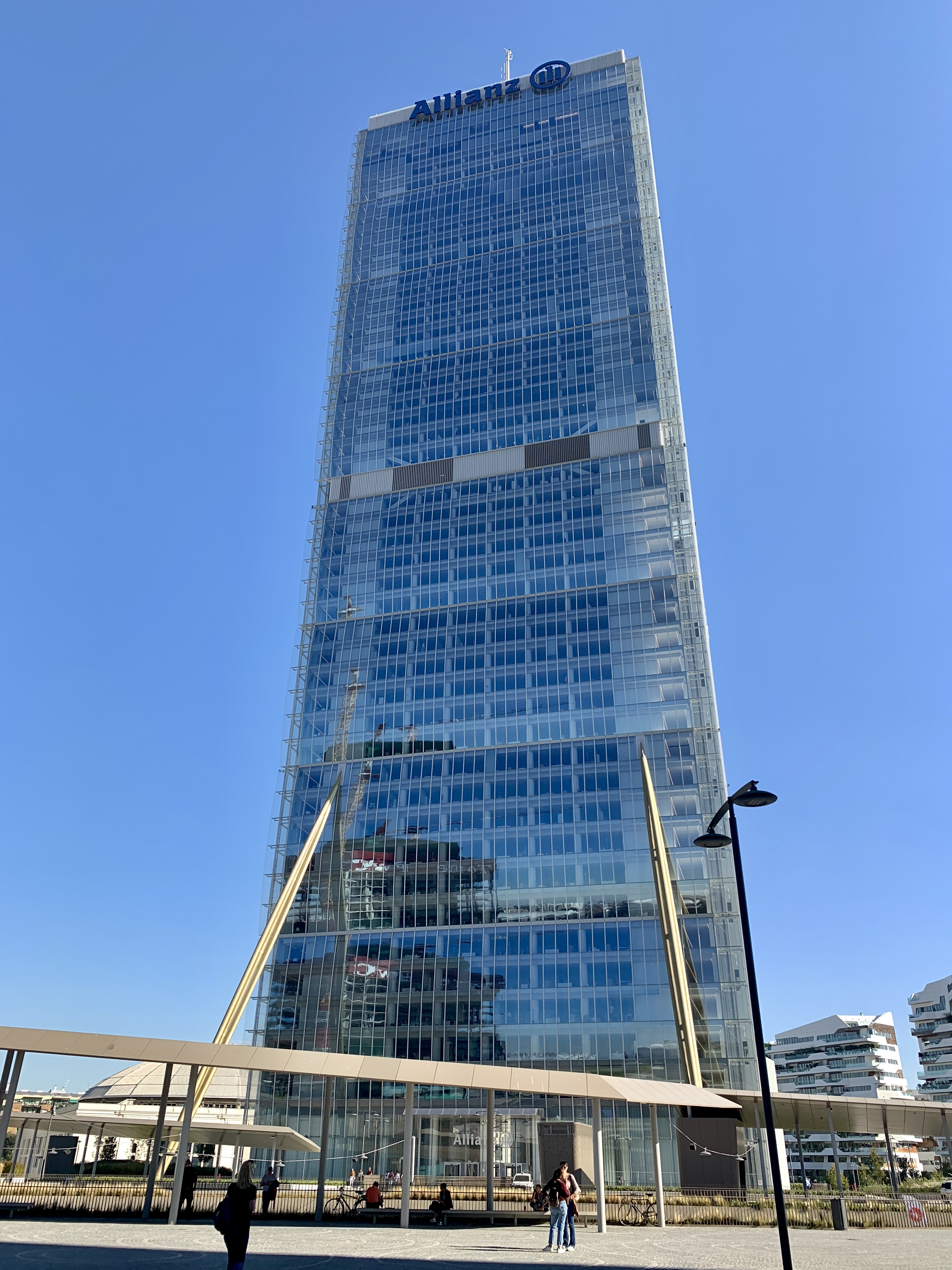
- Allianz Tower
- Alternative names: Isozaki Tower; Il Dritto (The Straight One)

General information
- Status: Completed
- Type: Mixed use
- Architectural style: Modern
- Location: Milan, Italy
- Construction started: 2012
- Opening: 2015

Height
- Antenna spire: 263 m (863 ft)
- Roof: 213 m (699 ft)

Technical details
- Floor count: 50
- Floor area: 81,615 m^{2} (878,500 sq ft)

Design and construction
- Architects: Arata Isozaki & Associates; Andrea Maffei Architects

Website
- Official website

Allianz Tower (Italian: Torre Allianz), also known as Isozaki Tower (Italian: Torre Isozaki) and il Dritto ("the straight one"), is a 50-floor, 260-metre-tall (850 ft) skyscraper in Milan, Italy. Designed by Japanese architect Arata Isozaki and Italian architect Andrea Maffei, it serves as the headquarters of the Italian subsidiary Allianz SpA.

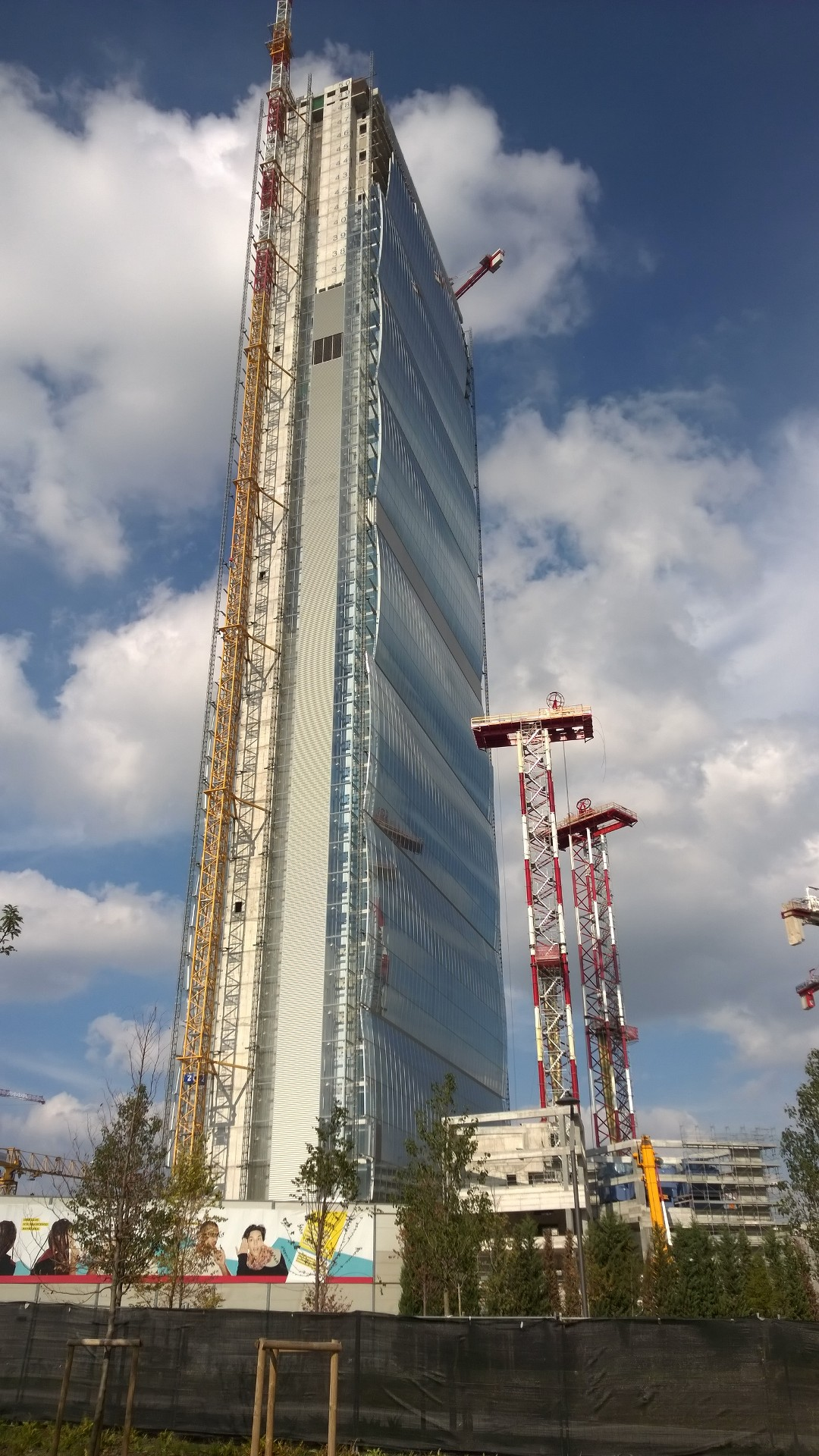
The tower under construction

It is the tallest building in Italy at 210 m (690 ft). It sometimes ranks after the UniCredit Tower, with the latter's spire increasing its pinnacle height to 238 metres; although Allianz Tower's antenna also raised its pinnacle height to 260 meters (850 ft). It is composed by eight modules by six floors each one, with the façade of the module composed by a triple-glass unit slightly curved to outside. The vertical succession of rounded forms creates a feeling of slight vibration of the volume of the building as it rises upward. Elevations of the short sides are fully glazed and show the mechanical series of six panoramic lifts going up and down to the various floors of the building.

Preparatory work for the tower's construction began on March 13, 2012, with the creation of the foundation slab, which measures approximately 63 by 27 meters.

The contract for the detailed design and construction of the building was awarded in May 2012.

Actual erection of the structure began in the summer of that same year; by the end of the season—in the autumn—the building had risen above street level. In 2016, Allianz Tower was nominated by Emporis as the third-best skyscraper that was completed in 2015.

The idea of an endless tower can be compared to previous ambitions of other artists, such as Constantin Brâncuși, for example, who in 1937–38 installed one of his endless columns of Târgu Jiu in the park to create repeatable systems indefinitely.

== See also ==
- List of tallest buildings in Italy
