= Generali Tower =

Skyscraper in Milan

- Torre Generali (Italian)
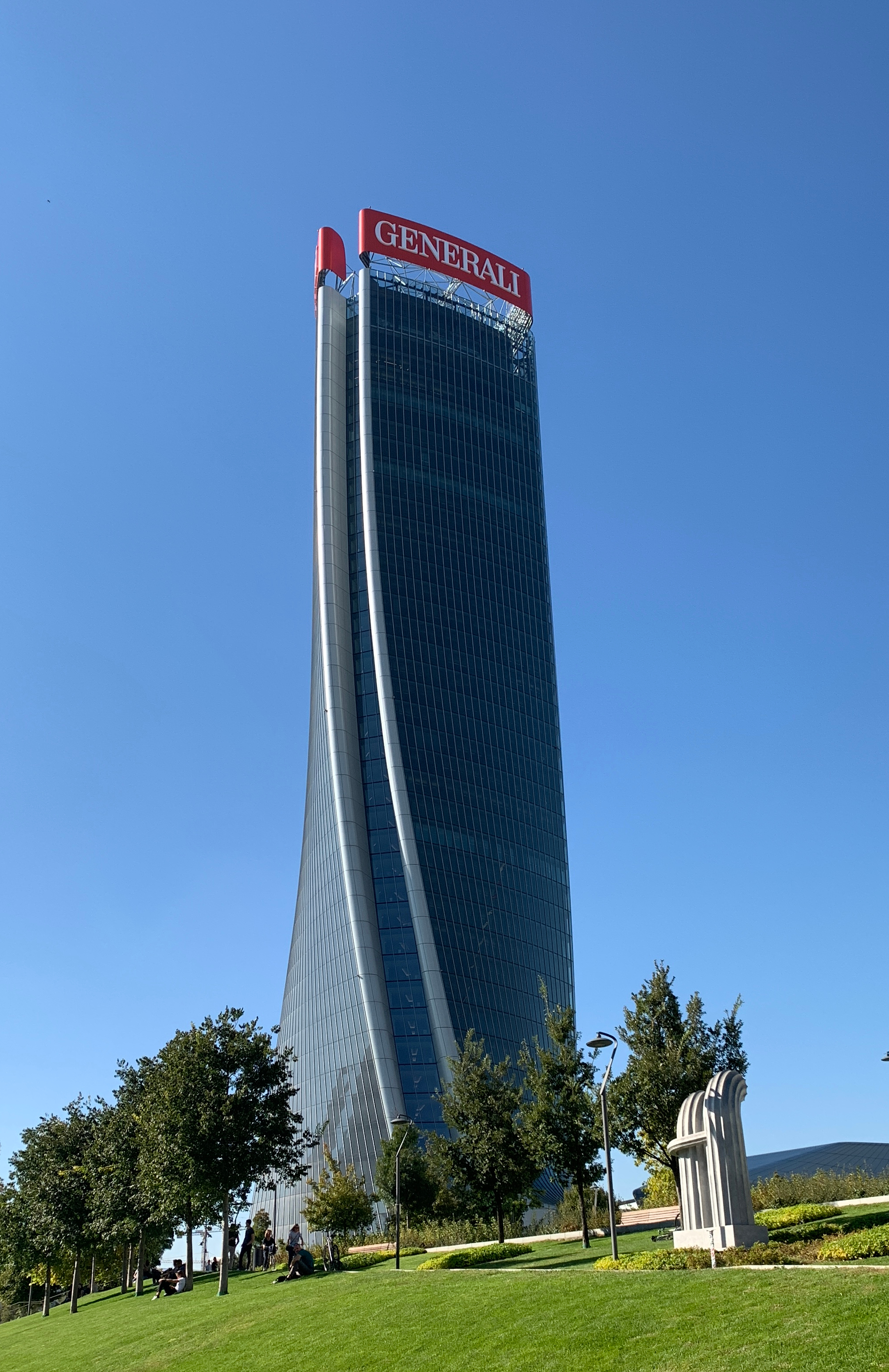

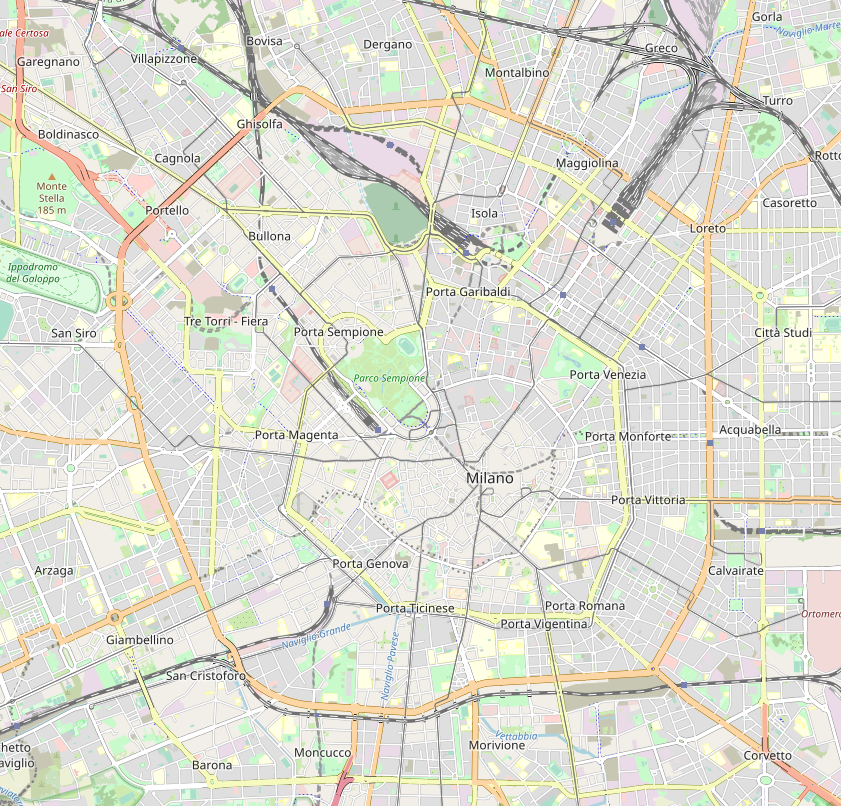
- Location within Milan

General information
- Status: Completed
- Type: Office
- Architectural style: Modern
- Location: Milan, Italy
- Coordinates: 45.4783°N 9.1552°E
- Construction started: 2014
- Opening: 2017

Height
- Roof: 191.5 m (628 ft)

Technical details
- Floor count: 44

Design and construction
- Architect: Zaha Hadid Architects
- Structural engineer: Mauro E. Giuliani - Redesco Srl Milan

Generali Tower, or Hadid Tower (lo Storto, "the Twisted One"), is an office skyscraper completed in 2017 in Milan, Italy that reaches a height of 177.4 m (582 ft) with 44 floors (+ 3 floors basement), and a total floor area of about 67,000 square metres (720,000 sq ft). Its designer is the Anglo-Iraqi architect Zaha Hadid, hence it is also called torre Hadid ("Hadid Tower"). The geometry of the building is that of a warping shape, where both the dimensions of the floors and their orientation vary along the tower axis.

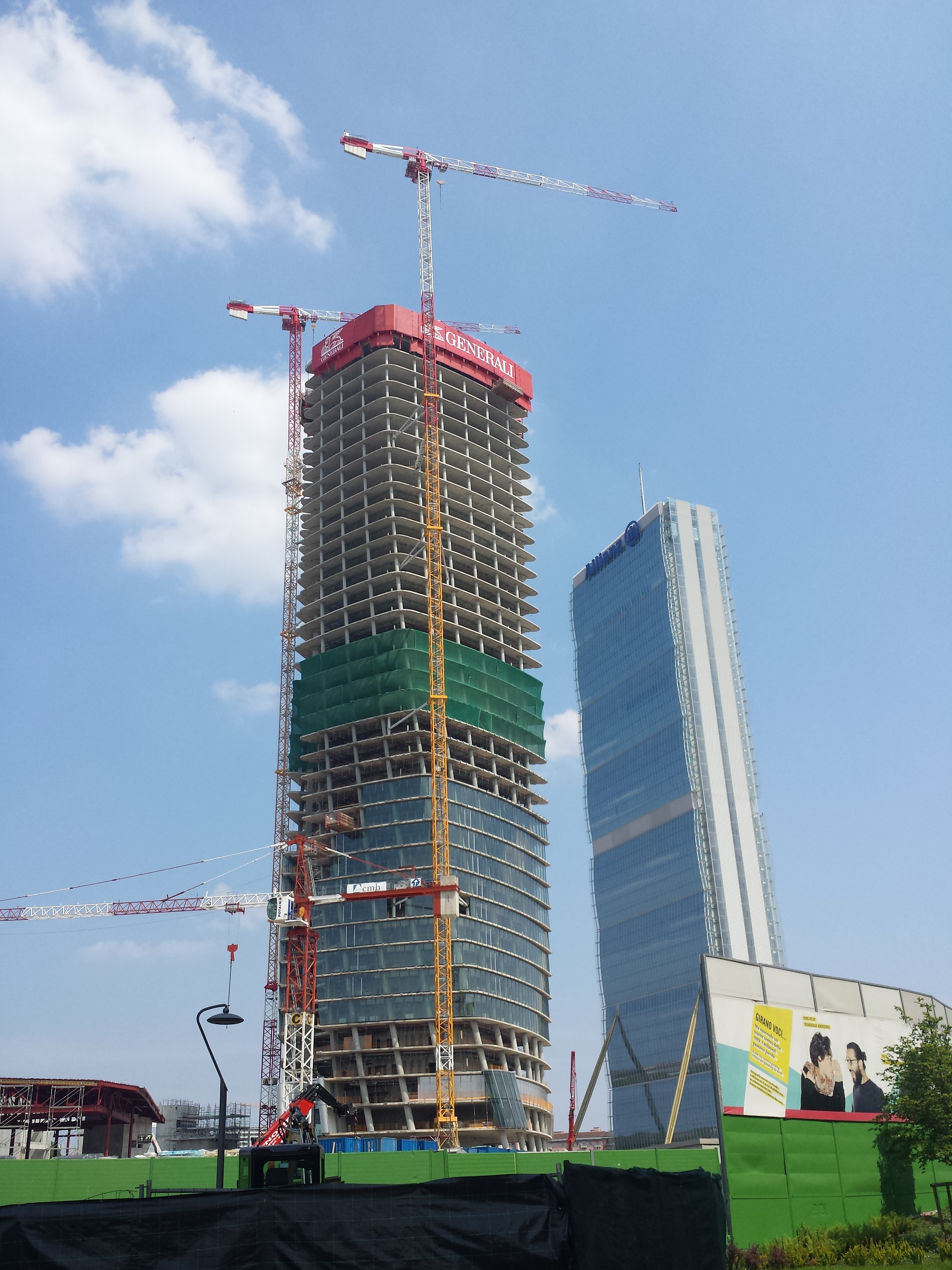
The tower under construction in 2016

The structure is concrete and composite. A central core acts as the main horizontal stiffening and resisting element. Foundations are of mixed raft and pile type, where the piles are used as settlement reduction devices. The base raft is a 2.5-metre-thick (8.2 ft) concrete slab, resting on 64 piles arranged in clusters and points under the main load points. In order to resist the main torsional effects due to the warped column arrangement, the core lintels above main doors feature composite solutions with a mixed use of steel elements, rebar and concrete. Due to the specific form-dependent deformation effects, a highly sophisticated stage analysis, both for construction and long-term effects, has been performed. A steel, free-form podium for commercial use surrounds the base of the building.

In October 2019, the tower was awarded first place for excellence in the high-rise category by the American Concrete Institute.

The building hosts offices of Assicurazioni Generali, the third largest insurance group in the world by revenue.

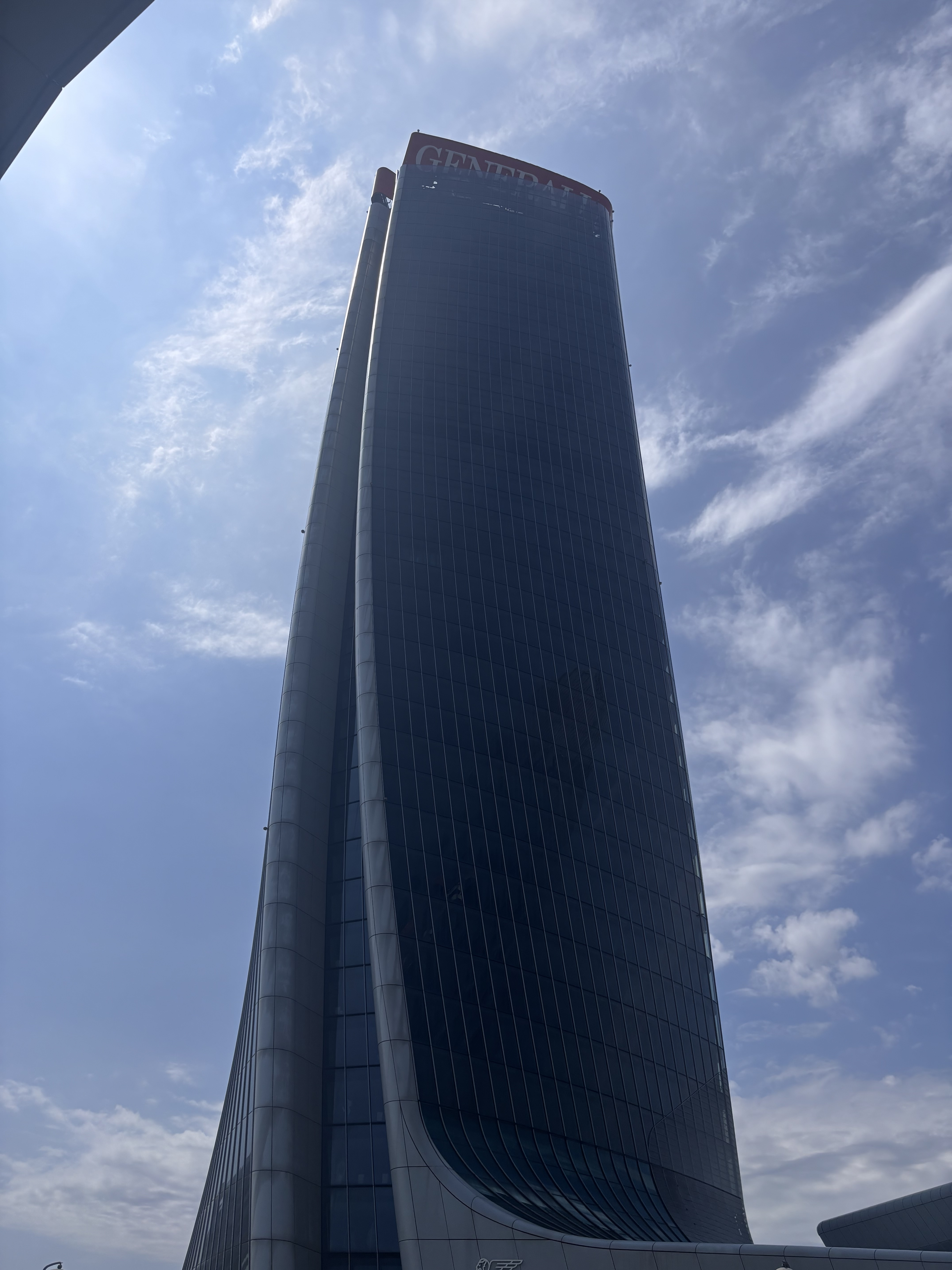
The tower after the partial collapse of the sign, July 2025

In June 2025, the signage on top of the building displaying the Generali logo partially collapsed.

== See also ==
- List of twisted buildings
- List of tallest buildings in Italy
