= Solaria Tower =

Skyscraper in Milan, Italy

Coordinates: 45.4822°N 9.1938°E

- Torre Solaria (Italian)

General information
- Status: Completed
- Type: Residential
- Location: Milan, Italy
- Opening: 2014

Height
- Roof: 143 m (469 ft)

Technical details
- Floor count: 37

Design and construction
- Architect: Arquitectonica

The Solaria Tower (Italian: Torre Solaria) is a residential skyscraper located in Milan, Italy.

== History ==
Designed by Miami-based Arquitectonica, the tower was built in 2013.

== Description ==
Situated in Milan's Porta Nuova district, the tower stands 143 m (469 ft) tall with 37 floors, making it the second-tallest residential skyscraper in Italy behind Rome's 155 m (509 ft) Torre Eurosky.

The building has a floorplan featuring three separate wings that extend from a central core, which serves as the main structural and distribution element.

== See also ==
Pedestrian bride leading to Solaria Tower

- Skyscraper design and construction
- List of tallest buildings in Italy
