= List of buildings in Milan =

This is a list of buildings in Milan.

== Churches ==
=== Paleochristian, Romanesque ===
- Basilica of Sant'Ambrogio
- Basilica of San Calimero
- Basilica of Sant'Eustorgio
- Basilica of San Lorenzo
- Basilica of San Nazaro in Brolo
- Basilica of San Simpliciano
- Basilica of S.Tecla (ruins)
- Basilica of S.Vincenzo in Prato
- Church of San Babila
- Church of San Bernardino alle Monache
- Church of San Faustino e Giovita
- Church of San Giovanni in Conca (ruins)
- Church of San Martino in Lambrate
- Church of San Pietro dei Pellegrini
- Church of San Sepolcro
- Church of San Siro alla Vepra
- Church of Santa Maria la Rossa
- Church of Santa Maria della Fontana
- Church of Santi Re Magi

=== Gothic ===
- Milan Cathedral, the Duomo
- Abbey of Chiaravalle
- Abbey of Mirasole
- Abbey of Viboldone
- Basilica of Sant'Eufemia
- Church of San Cristoforo sul Naviglio
- Church of San Gottardo in Corte
- Church of San Marco
- Church of Santa Maria Bianca della Misericordia
- Church of Santa Maria del Carmine
- Church of Santa Maria della Pace
- Church of Santa Maria delle Grazie al Naviglio
- Church of Santa Maria Incoronata
- Church of Santa Maria Podone
- Church of San Pietro in Gessate

=== Renaissance ===
- Certosa of Garegnano
- Church di San Bartolomeo
- Church of San Gioachimo
- Church of Santa Maria delle Grazie, with Leonardo's Last Supper
- Church of Santa Maria dei Miracoli
- Church of San Maurizio al Monastero Maggiore
- Church of Santa Maria presso San Satiro

=== Mannerism ===
- Church of Sant'Antonio Abate
- Church of San Barnaba
- Church of San Carlo al Lazzaretto
- Church of San Fedele
- Church of Santa Maria della Passione
- Church of San Sebastiano
- Church of San Vito in Pasquirolo

=== Baroque ===
- Basilica of Santo Stefano Maggiore
- Church of Sant'Alessandro in Zebedia
- Church of Sant'Angelo
- Church of San Bernardino alle Ossa
- Church of San Francesco di Paola
- Church of San Giorgio al Palazzo
- Church of San Giuseppe
- Church of Santa Maria al Paradiso
- Church of Santa Maria alla Porta
- Church of Santa Maria Annunciata all'Ospedale Maggiore
- Church of Santa Maria Assunta in Camposanto
- Church of Santa Maria Assunta in Turro
- Church of Santa Maria della Vittoria
- Church of Santa Maria Segreta
- Church of San Michele Arcangelo in Precotto
- Church of San Michele ai Nuovi Sepolcri
- Church of San Nicolao
- Church of San Paolo Converso
- Church of San Raffaele
- Church of San Vittore al Corpo

=== Neoclassic ===
- Church of San Carlo al Corso
- Church of Santa Maria della Consolazione
- Church of San Tomaso in Terramara

== Notable monuments ==
- Castello Sforzesco
- Central Station
- Cimitero Maggiore di Milano
- Cimitero Monumentale
- FieraMilano at Rho
- Galleria del Corso
- Galleria Vittorio Emanuele II

== Palaces and villas ==
13th century

- Casa Panigarola
- Palazzo della Ragione

14th century

- Loggia degli Osii

15th century

- Casa Atellani
- Casa Fontana Silvestri
- Casa Parravicini
- Cascina (della) Boscaiola or Cascina Boscarola
- Cascina Pozzobonelli
- Ospedale Maggiore (Ca' Granda), former city hospital designed by Filarete, now housing the University of Milan
- Palazzo Acerbi
- Palazzo Borromeo
- Palazzo Carmagnola
- Palazzo Castani
- Palazzo Isimbardi
- Palazzo Pozzobonelli-Isimbardi
- Villa Mirabello or Cascina Mirabello

16th century

- Palazzo Casati Stampa di Soncino
- Palazzo di Brera
- Palazzo dei Giureconsulti
- Palazzo delle Scuole Palatine
- Palazzo Marino
- Palazzo Recalcati
- Palazzo Taverna
- Villa Simonetta

17th century

- Casa Buttafava
- Casa Crespi
- Casa degli Omenoni
- Casa Toscanini
- Palazzo Annoni
- Palazzo Arcivescovile
- Palazzo Cusani
- Palazzo del Capitano di Giustizia
- Palazzo del Senato (Milano)
- Palazzo delle ex Scuole Arcimbolde
- Palazzo delle Stelline
- Palazzo Dugnani
- Palazzo Durini
- Palazzo Erba Odescalchi
- Palazzo Litta o Arese
- Palazzo Olivazzi
- Palazzo Orsini
- Palazzo Pusterla Brivio
- Palazzo Sormani

18th century

- Casa Berchet
- Casa Beccaria
- Casa Buzzoni
- Casa Monti (Milano)
- Palazzina Appiani
- Palazzo Belgiojoso
- Palazzo Citterio
- Palazzo Clerici
- Palazzo Confalonieri
- Palazzo Fagnani
- Palazzo Gallarati Scotti
- Palazzo Greppi
- Palazzo Litta-Cusani
- Palazzo Mellerio
- Palazzo Morando-Attendolo-Bolognini
- Palazzo Moriggia
- Palazzo Reale, Royal Palace
- Palazzo Serbelloni
- Palazzo Sormani Andreani
- Palazzo Trivulzio
- Palazzo Visconti di Modrone

19th century

- Ca' de Facc
- Ca' de Sass
- Casa Alesina
- Casa Bottelli
- Casa Bettoni o dei Bersaglieri
- Casa Borella
- Casa Bosi Pelitti
- Casa Broggi
- Casa Candiani
- Casa Castini
- Casa Celesia
- Casa Chicchieri
- Casa Ciani
- Casa Dell'Acqua
- Casa Fasoli
- Palace Galmanini Portaluppi
- Casa Gadda-Portaluppi
- Casa Grondona
- Casa Manzoni
- Casa Negri
- Casa Pirovano
- Casa Poldi Pezzoli
- Casa Reininghaus
- Casa Rigamonti
- Casa Rossi
- Casa Sardi
- Casa Sartorelli
- Palazzo Anguissola Antona Traversi
- Palazzo Archinto
- Palazzo Barozzi
- Palazzo Besana
- Palazzo Bagatti-Valsecchi
- Palazzo Beltrami
- Palazzo Bonacosa
- Palazzo Borgazzi
- Palazzo Brentani
- Palazzo Cagnola
- Palazzo Carcano-Tondani
- Palazzo Chiesa
- Palazzo del Museo di Scienze Naturali
- Palazzo dell'ex Kursaal Diana
- Palazzo della Permanente
- Palazzo della Società per le Strade Ferrate del Mediterraneo
- Palazzo della Veneranda Fabbrica del Duomo
- Palazzo Diotti anche conosciuto come "Palazzo della prefettura"
- Palazzo Ercole Turati
- Palazzo Francesco Turati
- Palazzo Haas
- Palazzo Luraschi
- Palazzo Melzi d'Eril
- Palazzo Porro-Lambertenghi
- Palazzo Rusconi-Clerici
- Palazzo Saporiti
- Palazzo Savonelli
- Palazzo Spinola
- Palazzo Talenti
- Palazzo Tarsis
- Palazzo Taverna
- Palazzo Torelli-Viollier
- Villa Belgiojoso-Bonaparte, known as the Royal Villa of Milan

20th century

- Ca' Brutta
- Casa Apostolo
- Casa Caccia Dominioni
- Casa Campanini
- Casa Cambiaghi
- Casa Ferrario
- Casa Galimberti
- Casa Guazzoni
- Casa Laugier
- Casa Morganti
- Casa Piana
- Castello Cova
- Palazzo Berri-Meregalli
- Palazzo Bolchini
- Palazzo Castiglioni
- Palazzo Civita
- Palazzo Crespi
- Palazzo Cusini
- Palazzo di Giustizia
- Palazzo del cinema Odeon
- Palazzo del Toro
- Palazzo dell'Arte
- Palazzo della Banca Commerciale Italiana
- Palazzo della Banca d'Italia
- Palazzo della Banca di Roma
- Palazzo della Banca Popolare di Milano
- Palazzo della ex Borsa
- Palazzo della Rinascente
- Palazzo della Società Reale Mutua di Assicurazioni
- Palazzo Fidia
- Palazzo Meroni
- Palazzo Mezzanotte
- Palazzo Veronesi
- Torre Rasini
- Torre San Babila
- Torre Velasca
- Villa Necchi Campiglio
- Villino Calabresi
- Villino Gotico
- Villino Hoepli

== Skyscrapers and towers ==
The Bosco Verticale was awarded the International High Rise Award in 2014

- Bosco Verticale
- Branca Tower
- Centro Svizzero
- Palazzo Lombardia
- Pirelli Tower
- Torre Diamante
- Torre Garibaldi
- Torre Solaria
- Breda Tower
- Galfa Tower
- Telecom Tower, in Rozzano
- Velasca Tower

== Gates ==
- Porta Garibaldi
- Porta Genova
- Porta Nuova (medieval)
- Porta Sempione
- Porta Ticinese (medieval)
- Porta Ticinese (19th century)
- Porta Venezia
- Porta Vittoria
- Porta Volta
- Pusterla di Sant'Ambrogio

== Notable monuments ==
- Alessandro Manzoni in Piazza San Fedele
- Colonne di San Lorenzo
- Disc of Pomodoro
- Fontana del Piermarini in Piazza Fontana
- Mazzini's monument in Piazza della Repubblica
- Monumento Cinque Giornate
- Napoleone of Canova in Brera
- Oldrado da Trasseno del Palazzo della Ragione
- San Carlo Borromeo in Piazza Borromeo
- Leonardo's monument in Piazza della Scala
- Roman amphitheatre (scant remains)
- Archi di Porta Nuova
- Leonardo da Vinci's Horse Statue at Hippodrome
- The Needle and the Yarn in Piazza Cadorna

== Museums, galleries and exhibition spaces ==
Art museums

- Biblioteca d'arte del Castello Sforzesco
- Case Museo di Milano
- Civico museo di arte contemporanea
- Galleria d'Arte Moderna (GAM)
- Gallerie di Piazza Scala
- Galleria vinciana
- Museo Bagatti Valsecchi
- Museo degli strumenti musicali
- Museo del Duomo
- Museo del Novecento
- Museo delle arti decorative
- Museo Diocesano
- Museo Poldi Pezzoli
- Padiglione d'arte contemporanea
- Palazzo Reale di Milano
- Pinacoteca Ambrosiana e Biblioteca Ambrosiana
- Pinacoteca del Castello Sforzesco
- Pinacoteca di Brera
- Raccolte d'arte applicate
- Triennale di Milano

Historical museums

- Antiquarium Alda Levi
- Biblioteca Trivulziana
- Casa Manzoni
- Civica raccolta delle stampe "Achille Bertarelli"
- Civico archivio fotografico
- Museo archeologico
- Museo d'arte antica
- Museo del mobile
- Museo del Risorgimento
- Museo della Basilica di Sant'Ambrogio
- Museo della Basilica di Santa Maria della Passione
- Museo della Preistoria e Protostoria
- Museo della Pusterla - Mostra permanente di Criminologia e Armi Antiche
- Museo di Arte Estremo-Orientale e di Etnografia
- Museo di Storia Contemporanea
- Museo Egizio

Science museums

- Acquario civico di Milano
- Museo di Storia Naturale
- Museo della Scienza e della Tecnologia "Leonardo da Vinci"
- Planetario di Milano

Other museums

- La Permanente
- Museo Civico Marinaro "U. Mursia"
- Museo d'arte e scienza
- Museo dei Navigli
- Museo del Cinema
- Museo del Giocattolo e del Bambino
- Museo delle Cere
- Museo di Milano
- Museo Teatrale alla Scala
- San Siro Museum

== Theaters ==
- Teatro alla Scala
- Teatro degli Arcimboldi
- Piccolo teatro
- Teatro Lirico
- Teatro Carcano
- CRT - Teatro dell'Arte
- Manzoni
- Ventaglio Nazionale
- Nuovo
- Nuovo Piccolo Teatro
- Piccolo Teatro di Milano
- San Babila
- Smeraldo
- Ciak
- Della 14a
- Filodrammatici
- Litta
- Olmetto
- Out Off
- L'Elfo
- Porta Romana
- Franco Parenti
- Teatro Studio
- Verdi

== Universities ==
- Politecnico di Milano
- Università Statale
- Università Statale Milano-Bicocca
- Università Cattolica del Sacro Cuore
- Università Bocconi
- Scuola Superiore di Direzione Aziendale - Bocconi
- Università I.U.L.M.
- Università C.Cattaneo L.I.U.C.
- Università Vita-Salute San Raffaele (UniSR)
- L.U.C. Beato Angelico
- Accademia di Belle Arti di Brera
- Conservatorio di Musica Giuseppe Verdi di Milano
- Istituto Europeo di Design
- Istituto superiore di educazione fisica (I.S.E.F.)
- Nuova Accademia di Belle Arti Milano - NABA

== See also ==
- List of buildings
