= Frette =

Italian textile company

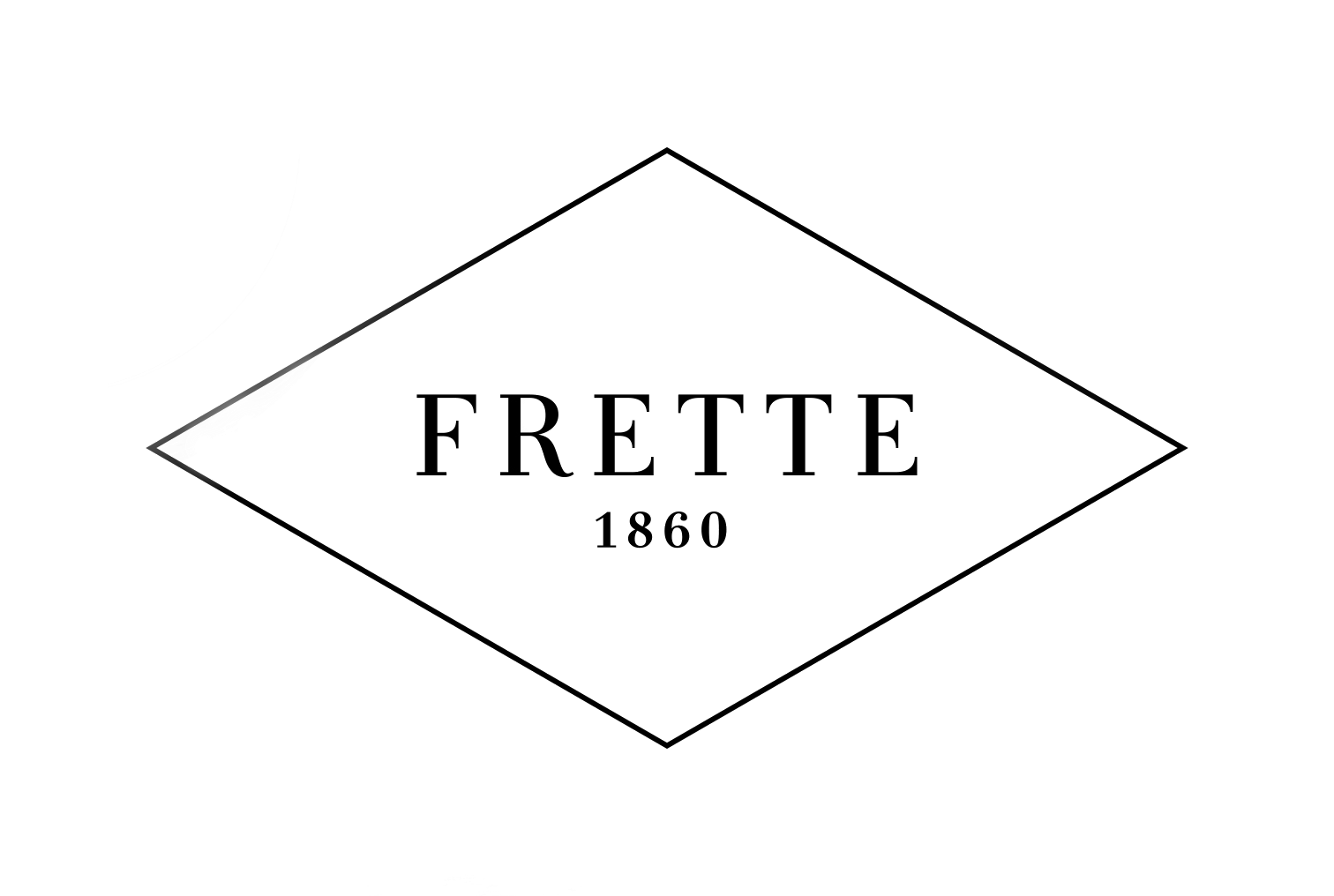

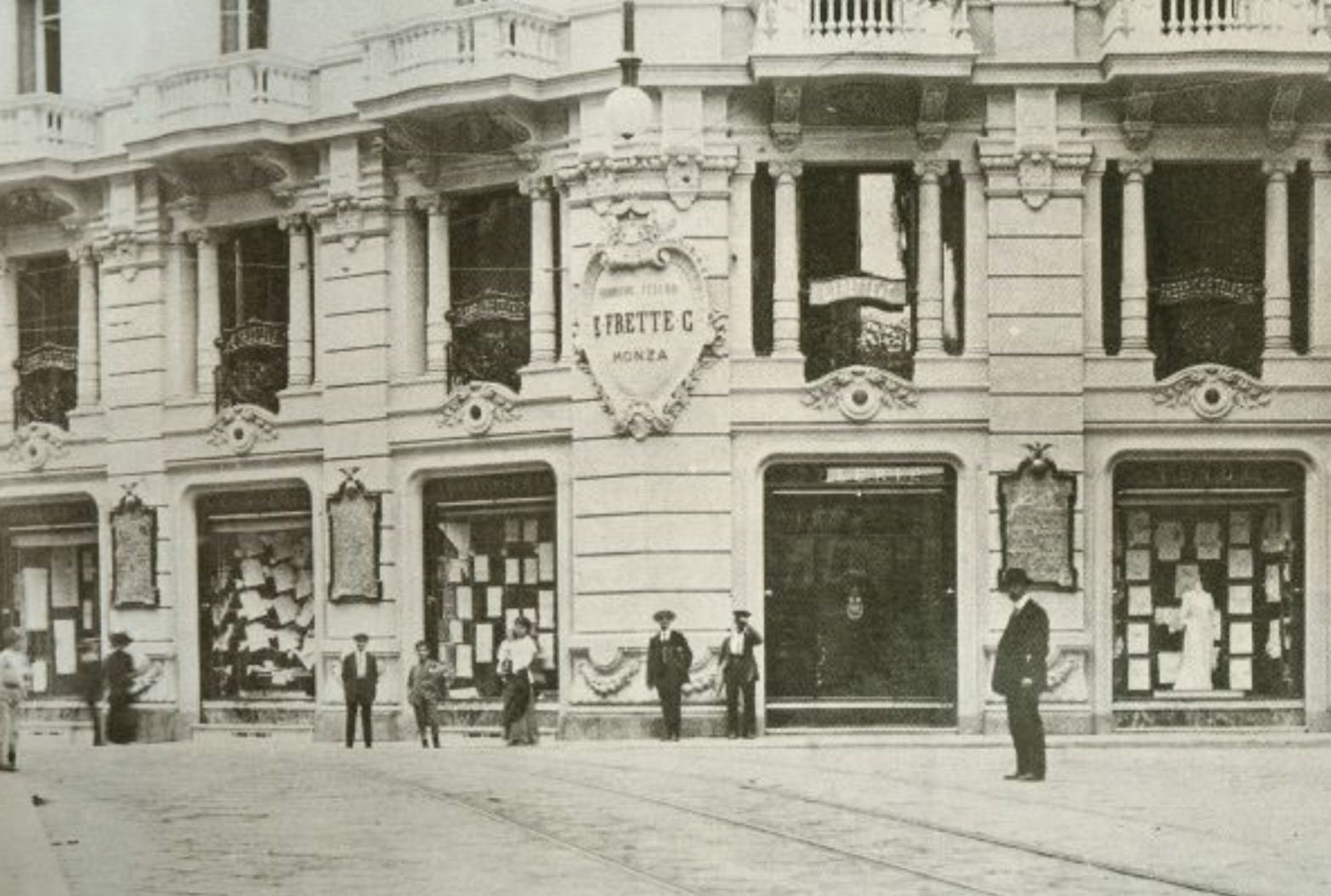
- Original Frette Storefront in Monza, Italy
- Type: Private
- Industry: Textiles
- Founded: 1 December 1860; 165 years ago (as Frette, Payre & Chaboud); Grenoble, France
- Founders: Jean Baptiste Edmond Frette; Alexandre Payre; Charles Chaboud
- Headquarters: Monza, Italy
- Area served: Over 100 global locations
- Products: Luxury linens and home lifestyle products
- Owner: Raza Heritage Holdings
- Website: www.frette.com

Frette (/frɛˈteɪ/ freh-TAY) is an Italian textile company that manufactures bed and bath linens. Established in Grenoble, France, in 1860, it was relocated to Concorezzo, Italy, five years later. Their headquarters are currently in Monza, Italy. As of 2023, the company owns and operates over 100 boutiques worldwide.

== History ==
Jean Baptiste Ennemonde (Edmond) Chavasse Frette was born on 12 June 1838, in Grenoble, France, to Jean Claude Chavasse Frette, a fabric dyer, merchant, and manufacturer of socks and knitted shirts, and Marie Maréchal. After her husband died in 1840, Marie took up the activity of millinery to support her children.

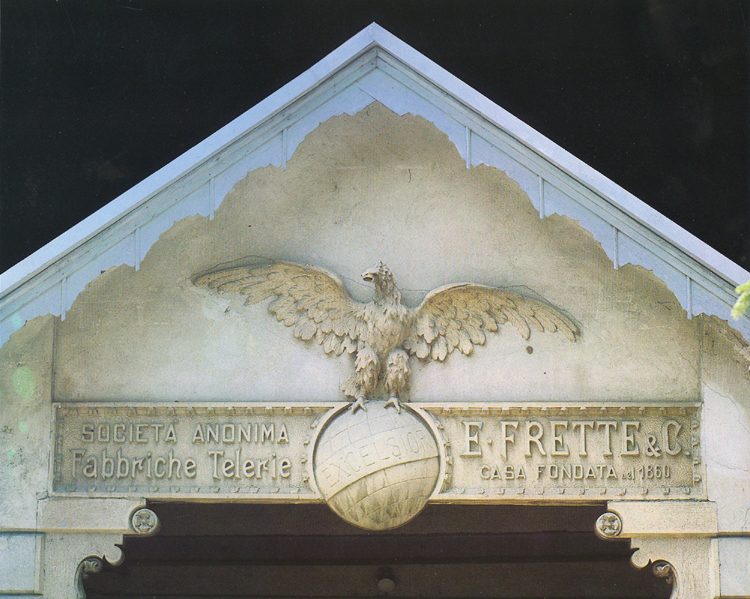
Frette Heritage 1860

On December 1, 1860, Edmond Frette, together with Charles Chaboud and Alexandre Payre, established Frette, Payre & Chaboud for "the commerce and manufacture of fabrics." Chaboud became the financial officer, and Payre and Frette became traveling merchants. As a traveling merchant, Frette started working in Italy, an export market and a source of materials. He first established himself in the Versilia area in Tuscany.

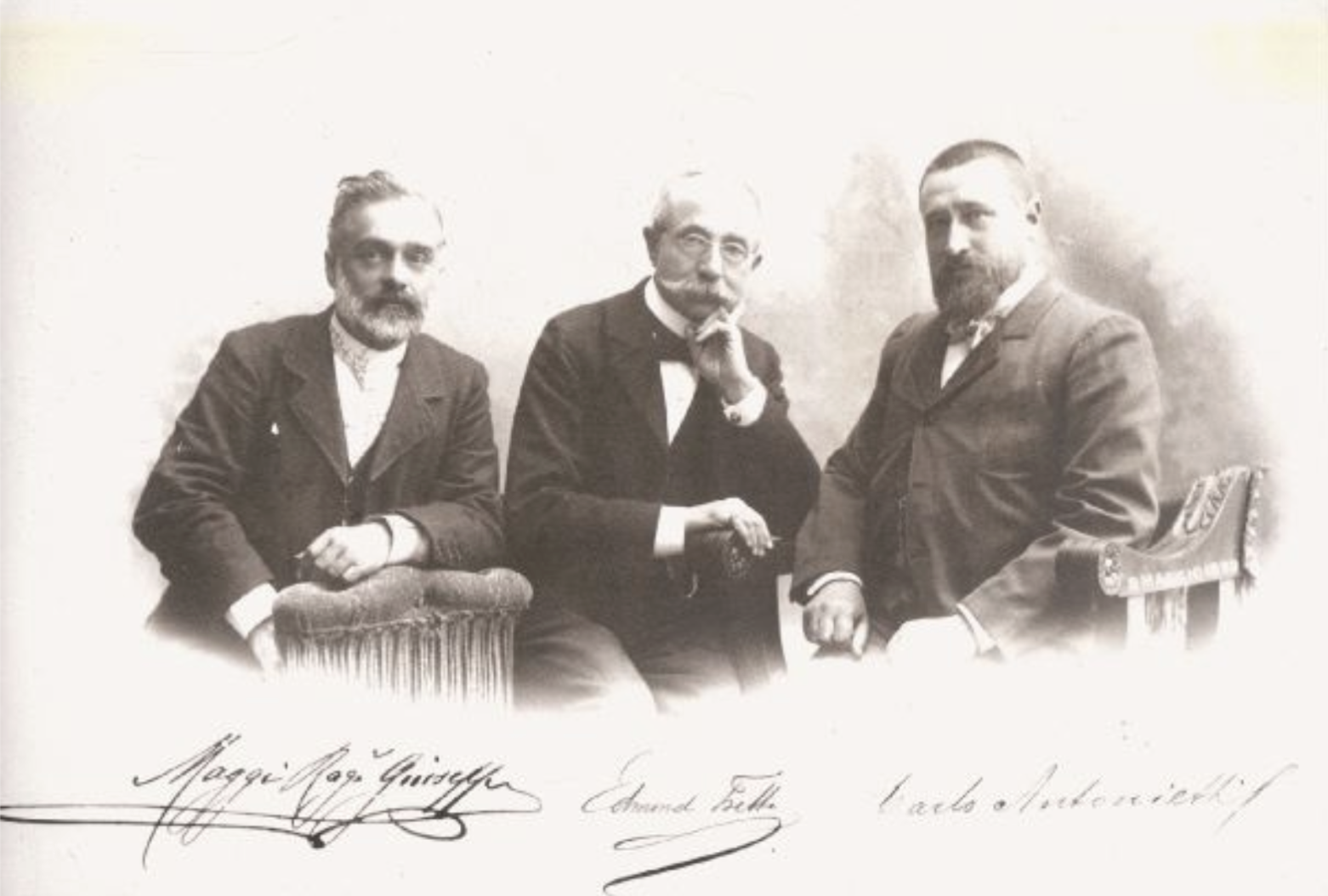
Edmond Frette (center) with Italian business partners

Between 1862 and 1863, Edmond Frette arrived in Monza and established another company branch. In the second half of the 1860s, Frette centralized production in his own factories. Coarse B2B products constituted the most significant portion of Frette's trade.

== Craftsmanship ==
Frette's craftsmanship is rooted in its use of premium materials and Italian heritage production techniques. Frette's identity is rooted in the artisanal traditions of Monza and the Brianza regions of Italy, where generations of craftsmen have honed their skills in textile artistry.

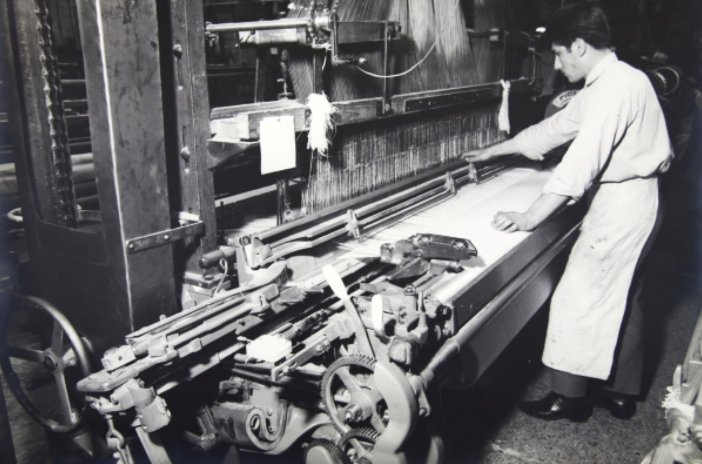
A weaver in the late 1800s operating a Frette loom.

Frette sources high-quality fibers including long staple cotton, silk, and cashmere, among other natural fibers. The company uses materials that are chosen for their durability, softness, and ability to retain color and texture over time. Its bed linens are produced using only extra-long staple cotton because with longer fibers, the strength and longevity of the finished product improves. The linens also undergo a patented finishing process to create the incredibly smooth and lustrous finish for which they are known.

Weaving takes place on both antique and modern jacquard looms, allowing the company to produce intricate and large scale designs. Frette is known for its mastery of patterns such as brocade, matelassé, and damask, which require careful programming of the loom to achieve the desired texture and design. Only a limited number of looms are capable of handling the complexity, and the process often involves highly trained technicians to oversee production. In 2020, Frette's CEO cited the small artisanal workshops scattered across Italy as the key to keeping the caliber so consistently high. “From beautiful laces manufactured in the south to embroidery in the north, we have about 200 different suppliers within Italy today.”

Frette continues to employ traditional methods in select pieces. Some linens are still woven on shuttle looms, a technique that produces a denser, more structured fabric. Though time consuming, this process contributes to the distinctive tactile quality of Frette. Each product takes roughly 18 months from ideation to realization, a process that ensures that each bedsheet, throw pillow, or towel set is of the highest standard that reflects the brand's reputation of regal comfort. Even some sheet sets, which retail for up to €3,800 on the website, take four weeks to make.

Frette's production model incorporates partnerships with a network of specialized textile workshops and artisans across Italy. The company collaborates with hundreds of independent suppliers and craftspeople who contribute expertise in areas such as weaving, dyeing, embroidery, and finishing.

== Bespoke ==
Frette's bespoke services began with royal families, and their archives include crests of the Borromeos and Borgheses. In addition to working with more than 500 royal families, the brand has a history with working with famous clients such as, The Vatican, St. Peter’s Basilica, Orient Express and Titanic. Today, Frette bespoke extends to bedding, table linens, towels, and loungewear, and offers a multitude of fabric and thread colors, lace borders, monograms, and motifs.

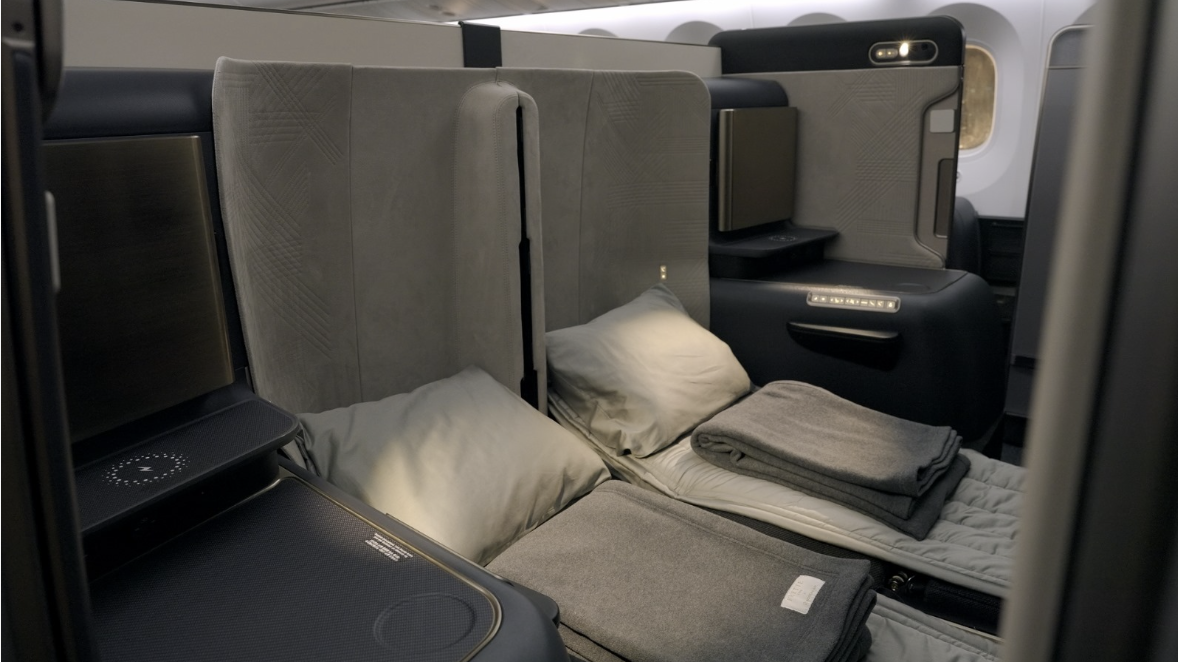
Frette linens used in the first class cabin on a Korean Air flight.

Frette also provides bespoke linens for luxury cruise lines, private and commercial aviation interiors, and superyachts, tailoring its products to meet the space constraints and durability requirements of these environments while maintaining the brand's quality.

== Hospitality ==
Frette started working with the Hotel Danieli in Venice, Italy in 1899, and has now expanded to the Ritz-Carlton, St. Regis Hotels, The Peninsula, Soho House, and Rosewood Hotels.

Frette has also developed exclusive product lines for select luxury hotel groups. In 2023, the brand introduced Frette 1860 for St. Regis Hotels, a collection designed specifically for use across St. Regis Hotels properties worldwide. Other high profile partners include custom collections for The Ritz Carlton, and Italy's famed Portrait Hotels (part of the Lungarno Collection) and Pellicano Hotel group.

== Collaborations ==
In April 2024, Frette launched its first-ever fashion collaboration with American designer Thom Browne during Salone del Mobile. The collection featured white cotton sateen bedding adorned with Browne's signature four-bar embroidery in grey, wool-cashmere blankets, and terry cotton towels. A standout piece is a light grey cotton velour bathrobe inspired by Browne's iconic trench coat, complete with the brand's red, white, and blue grosgrain ribbon. The collaboration was unveiled through a theatrical performance titled "Time To Sleep" at Palazzina Appiani in Milan, reflecting Browne's penchant for blending fashion with performance art.

== Company timeline ==
- 1860: Jean Baptiste Edmond Frette, Alexandre Payre and Charles Chaboud manufacture and begin distributing home linens from Grenoble, France.
- 1865: Two plants established in Concorezzo, Italy near Monza with production of luxury fabrics on Jacquard looms.
- 1878: Opens its first retailing shop in Manzoni, Milan, which still operates today.
- 1880: The Ministry of Foreign Affairs for the Kingdom of Italy commissions Frette to produce linen for the Ministry and all Italian embassies worldwide, beginning a tradition that continues to this day.
- 1881: Frette wins the Gold Medal Award at the National Exhibition in Milan and becomes an official "Provider to the Royal House."
- 1886: Introduces the first catalog sales and begins retailing outside Italy.
- 1887: Frette opens a store in Rome.
- 1888: Creates the Tablecloth of the "Holy Virgin" for the altar of St. Peter's Basilica in Rome based on a drawing by the French painter Meurillion.
- 1889: Frette opens a store in Turin.
- 1902: Frette opens a store in Genoa.
- 1904: Frette opens a store in Florence.
- 1909: Edmond Frette dies at age 71 on August 29.
- 1911: Dresses the banqueting room of the Titanic.
- 1976: The last mail-order catalog was issued.
- 1977: First Frette boutique opens in Bond Street, London.
- 1978: Frette, Inc. is established in the United States.
- 1999: Descendants of the company's founders cede control to the Italian fashion group Fin.part.
- 2004: JH Partners, a San-Francisco-based private equity firm purchases Frette from Fin.part.
- 2009: Supplied linen to G8’s presidential rooms with assistance from the Head of Brand Alliance Michele Cascavilla.
- 2013: Frette launches the European ecommerce website, www.frette.com.
- 2014: JH Partners sells controlling stake in Frette to Change Capital for an undisclosed sum.
- 2015: The historic Frette store in Monza is closed.
- 2019: Frette introduces a new capsule collection of bedding, loungewear, and accent pieces called Album03.
- 2023: Change Capital sells Frette to private holding company, Raza Heritage Holdings.

== See also ==
- List of Italian companies
