= Prefecture, Milan =

Building in Milan, Italy

The Prefecture, Milan
- Palazzo della Prefettura di Milano
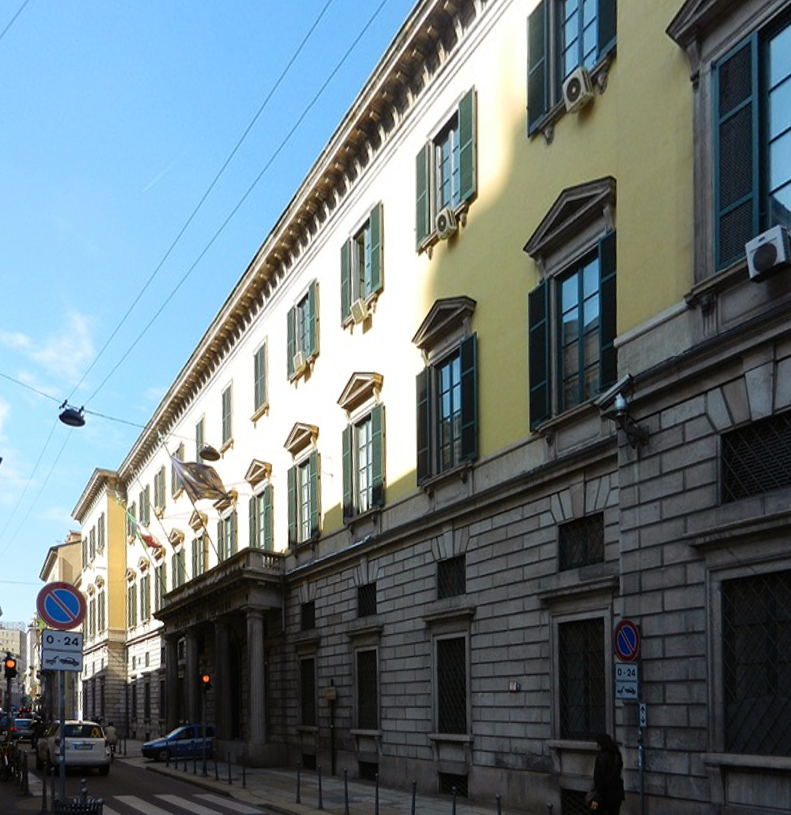
- Main facade overlooking Corso Monforte

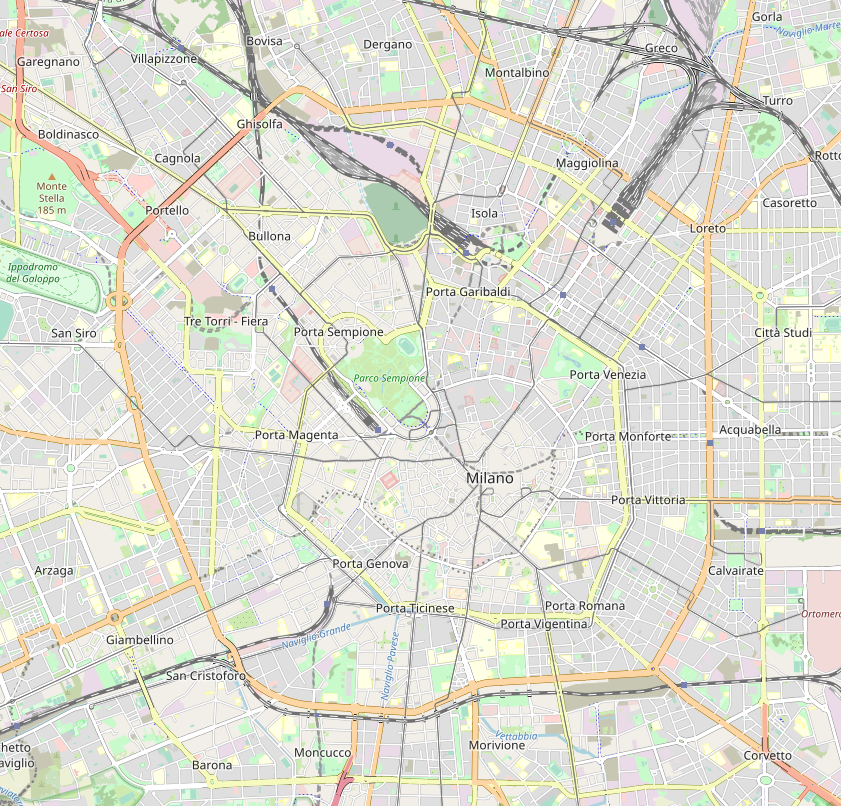
- Location within Milan Location within Italy
- Former names: Palazzo Diotti

General information
- Architectural style: Neoclassical
- Location: 31, Corso Monforte, Milan, Italy
- Coordinates: 45°28′03.21″N 9°12′09.56″E

Technical details
- Floor count: 3

Design and construction
- Architects: Giuseppe Piermarini, Giovanni Battista Diotti, Pietro Gilardoni

The Prefecture, Milan (Italian: Palazzo della Prefettura di Milano, transl. Palace of the Prefecture of Milan), also known as Palazzo Diotti, is a historic neoclassical building which has been the location of the office of the Prefect of Milan since 1859. The building is situated at 31, Corso Monforte in the city.

== History ==
The original building was constructed in the early 16th century for the Humiliati, a religious order originating in Lombardy. In 1616, after that order was suppressed by the pope, the building passed to another religious order, the Somaschi Fathers. In 1782 it was purchased by a wealthy lawyer, Giovanni Battista Diotti who spent twenty years extensively re-building it. Diotti, an amateur architect, designed much of the building helped by Giuseppe Piermarini and later Pietro Gilardoni (it).

However, financial difficulties forced Diotti to sell the building in 1803 to the short-lived Napoleonic Italian Republic, passing to Napoleon’s Kingdom of Italy when it was created in 1805. The building was used as the Ministry of the Interior for the new kingdom. After the Napoleonic period, the building became a centre of government of the Austrian-ruled Kingdom of Lombardy–Venetia from 1815 to 1859. In 1817, further work on the facade was carried out under the direction of Gilardoni. In 1849, it became the seat of the Austrian Lieutenant (or Governor) of Lombardy. Following Italian unification, it was chosen, in 1859, as the seat of the Prefecture of Milan in the new Kingdom of Italy, the Prefect being the representative of the national government at provincial level. Since then, it has remained as the seat of the Prefect of the former Province of Milan, and from 2015, its successor, the Metropolitan City of Milan.

Benito Mussolini resided in the Prefecture at the end of World War II, using it, from 18 to 25 April 1945, as his government’s last headquarters prior to the Allied victory. After the war, in 1947, it was seized and occupied for a short period by communists protesting at the removal of the left-wing Prefect of Milan, Ettore Troilo. The protest failed, however.

The building was owned by the Province of Milan, and, subsequently, the Metropolitan City of Milan, but rented to the Prefecture. In 2017, it was reported that it was to be sold by the Metropolitan City for 38m euros to a real estate fund, established and owned by the Ministry of Finance, to assist Milan’s budget problems.

== Description ==
Built in the neoclassical style, the imposing front of the Prefecture consists of two wings and a central section, which is set back. At the centre is a doric order peristyle which supports a balcony. The facade of the ground floor is composed of finely dressed ashlar. On the first floor there are windows decorated with lintels surmounted by triangular gables, while on the second floor the windows are decorated with simple stone frames. The interior contains frescoes by Andrea Appiani and additional decorations by the theatrical designer Clemente Isacchi.

== Bibliography ==
- Carra, Ilaria (29 October 2017). "Venduti allo Stato palazzo del prefetto e caserma deli Cc". La Repubblica.
- Clark, Martin (2014). Mussolini. Routledge. ISBN 978-1-317-89840-5.
- Cortes, Arnaldo (29 November 1947). "Communists Yield Milan Prefecture". The New York Times.
- Domenico, Roy Palmer (2003). Remaking Italy in the Twentieth Century. Rowman & Littlefield. ISBN 978-0-8476-9637-6.
- Lanza, Attilia (1993). Milano e i suoi palazzi: Porta Orientale, Romana e Ticinese. Libreria Meravigli Editrice. ISBN 9788879551250.
- Lio, Pierpaolo (14 August 2017). "Milano, dallo Stato 65 milioni per acquistare la Prefettura e la caserma Moscova". Corriere della Sera.
- Mezzanotte, Paolo; Bascapè, Giacomo (1968). Milano nell'arte e nella storia. Bestetti.
- Prefecture of Milan (Funzioni). "Funzioni". Prefettura - Ufficio Territoriale del Governo di Milano.
- Prefecture of Milan (Palazzo). "Il Palazzo". Prefettura - Ufficio Territoriale del Governo di Milano.
