= Casa Manzoni =

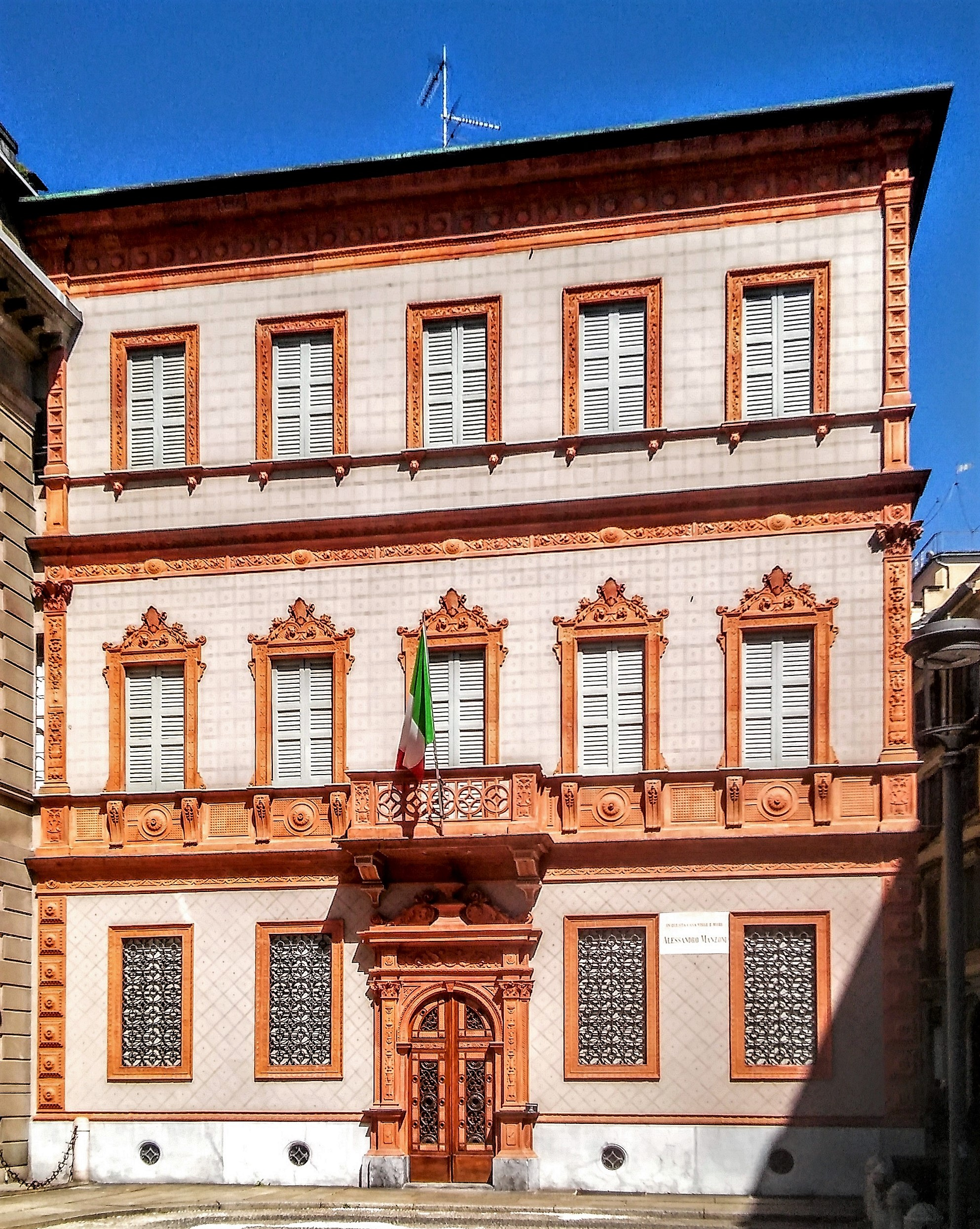
- The external facade of Casa Manzoni.
- Interactive map of Casa Manzoni
- Coordinates: 45.4679°N 9.1921°E
- Country: Italy
- Region: Lombardy
- Municipality: Milan
- Style: Renaissance Revival architecture
- Construction: 18th century
- Website: casadelmanzoni.it

Casa Manzoni ("Manzoni House") is a historical palace sited in via Morone 1 near the quadrilateral of fashion in the center of Milan, Lombardy, Italy, which was where novelist and poet Alessandro Manzoni lived from 1814 until his death in 1873. The building is also the venue of a museum dedicated to his life, the National Center for Manzonian Studies and the Historical Lombard Society.

== History ==
Built in the 18th century, the palace was restored in 1864 by Andrea Boni in Renaissance Revival style, which especially characterizes the façade overlooking Belgiojoso square, designed in 1864 at the request of Manzoni by architect Andrea Boni and covered with red terracotta.

The palace has hosted the gatherings of the club Il Conciliatore; famous men such as Giuseppe Verdi, Cavour and Garibaldi have visited it.

On the ground floor is the seat of the Historical Lombard Society, a specialized library with a collection of over 40,000 volumes about the history of Lombardy, and the National Center for Manzonian Studies.

The Manzoni Museum is located in two rooms overlooking the garden on the ground floor and in six rooms on the first floor: the original furnishing and ornaments have all been entirely preserved.

== See also ==
- Alessandro Manzoni

== Bibliography ==
- Milano e i suoi palazzi: Porta Vercellina, Comasina e Nuova, Attilia Lanza, 1992, Libreria Meravigli Editrice. (Italian language)
- Le città d'arte:Milano, Guide brevi Skira, ed.2008, autori vari. (Italian language)
- Milano e Provincia, Touring Club Italiano, ed.2003, autori vari. (Italian language)
