= Palazzo Recalcati =

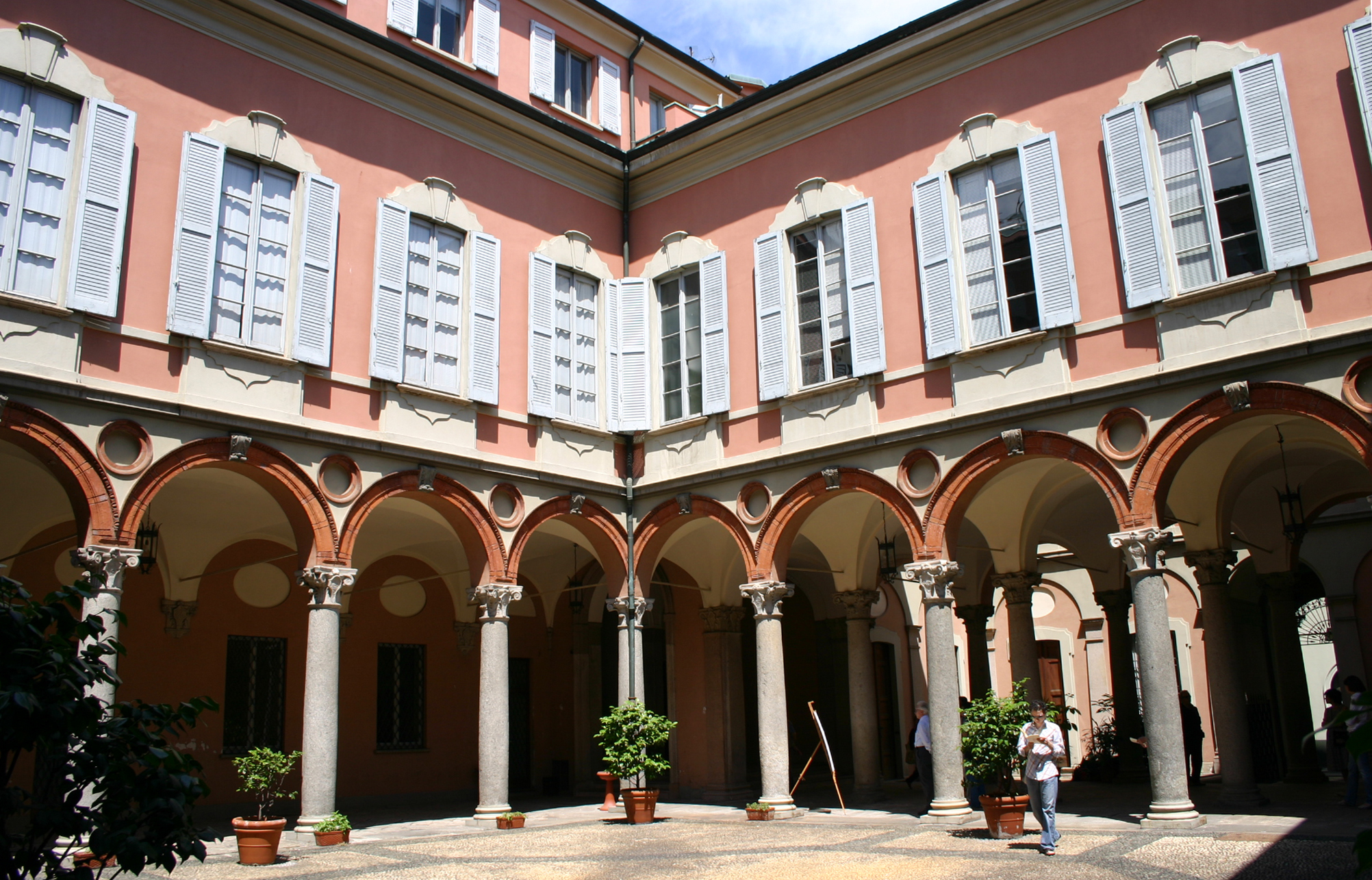
- Interactive map of the Palazzo Recalcati area
- Alternative names: Palazzo Litta Recalcati Prinetti

General information
- Status: In use
- Type: Palace
- Architectural style: Baroque
- Location: Milan, Italy, Via Amedei 8
- Coordinates: 45.459036°N 9.186885°E
- Construction started: 16th century
- Renovated: 17th–18th century (extension)

Palazzo Recalcati (also known as Palazzo Litta Recalcati Prinetti) is a 16th-century palace in Milan, Italy, which was expanded during the 17th and 18th centuries. Historically situated in the district of Porta Ticinese, it is situated at Via Amedei 8.

== History and description ==
The building has a historic core dating back to the 16th century, which was enlarged between the 17th and 18th centuries with the addition of an enclosed structure on Via Amedei by the Roman Giovanni Ruggeri. The more historic central courtyard survives today, featuring a portico on all four sides characterized by columns with terracotta lintels and roundels on the spandrels.

The later addition created a second courtyard connected to the inner courtyard by a loggia with six columns. Inside, there is a fine staircase with a wrought-iron parapet leading to the main floor, where the master's apartments were located, adorned with stucco and wall decorations. The eighteenth-century façade was originally constructed in rough brick and later plastered. Access to the building is provided by an elegant arched doorway, surmounted by a fine wrought-iron Baroque balcony. At the end of the 18th century, the coats of arms on the terracotta medallions in the spandrels of the arches were lost, chiselled away by the partisans of the Cisalpine Republic. However, according to Paolo Mezzanotte, the hanging capitals bear a strong resemblance to those removed from the great cloister of the Monastery of Santa Maria del Lentasio.

In the early 18th century, the palace belonged to the Litta family and later passed to the Recalcati and Prinetti families. Even at the beginning of the 19th century, there were reports of vast gardens extending behind the palace, which have since been lost. The palace underwent restoration during the post-war period.

== Bibliography ==
=== Italian sources ===
- Giacomo Carlo Bascapé, I palazzi della vecchia Milano, Hoepli, Milano, 1945 – pp. 96–97
- Paolo Mezzanotte, Giacomo Carlo Bascapé, Milano, nell'arte e nella storia, Bestetti, Milano, 1968 (1948) – p. 92
- Livia Negri, I palazzi di Milano, Newton & Compton, Milano, 1998 – pp. 273–274
