= San Vito in Pasquirolo, Milan =

Church in Milan, Italy

Coordinates: 45°27′53″N 9°11′46″E

Church of San Vito in Pasquirolo (Chiesa di San Vito in Pasquirolo)
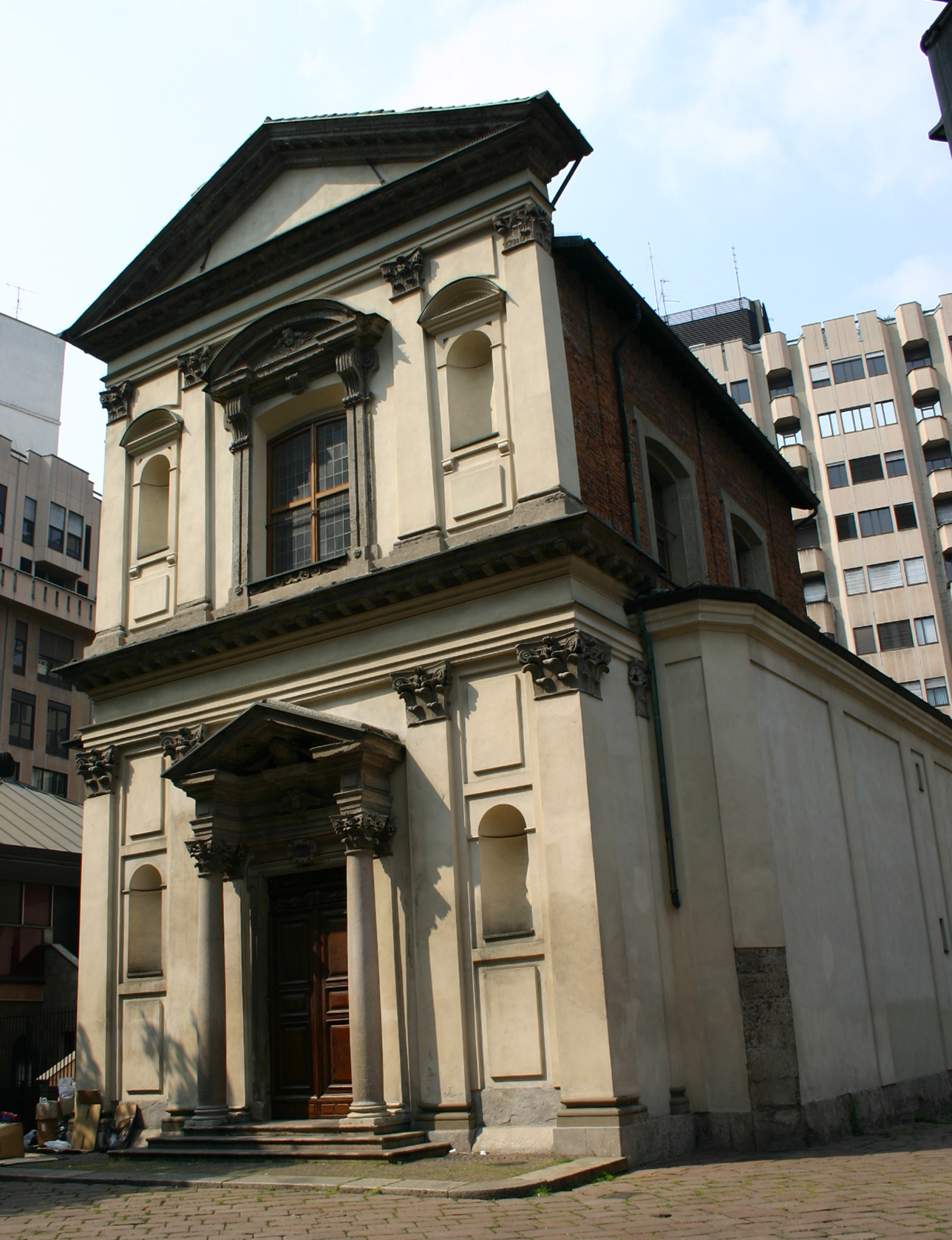
- Façade of the church.

Religion
- Affiliation: Roman Catholic
- Province: Milan
- Status: Active

Location
- Location: Milan, Italy
- Interactive map of Church of San Vito in Pasquirolo (Chiesa di San Vito in Pasquirolo)

Architecture
- Type: Church

San Vito in Pasquirolo is a late-Mannerist or early-Baroque-style, Russian Orthodox (formerly Roman Catholic) church, located on Largo Corsia dei Servi 4, in Milan, region of Lombardy, Italy.

== History ==
The church was built on the site of the ancient Frigidarium of the Baths of Hercules of Roman Mediolanum. It was erected after 1621, on the projects of Giovanni Pietro Orobono; the portal was designed by Luigi Miradori in 1626-1627. After World War II, targeted demolitions have recreated a small pasture or "Pasquirolo" after which the site was named. After being closed for decades, in 2007 the church has been gtranted for use by Archbishop Dionigi Tettamanzi to the Patriarchate of Moscow. Recently restored, it reopened in 2015.

The façade is in the Baroque style it is divided into two horizontal bands culminating at the top by a triangular pediment. The portal, at the center of the lower end, has a small porch with pediment supported by columns. The interior, with a nave with side chapels, decorated with elegant simplicity with stucco and frescoes (the latter in poor condition, as restored) by the brothers Fiammenghini.
