= Santa Maria la Rossa, Milan =

Church in Milan, Italy

Coordinates: 45°25′50″N 9°10′21″E

Church of Saint Mary la Rossa (Chiesa di Santa Maria Annunciata in Chiesa Rossa)
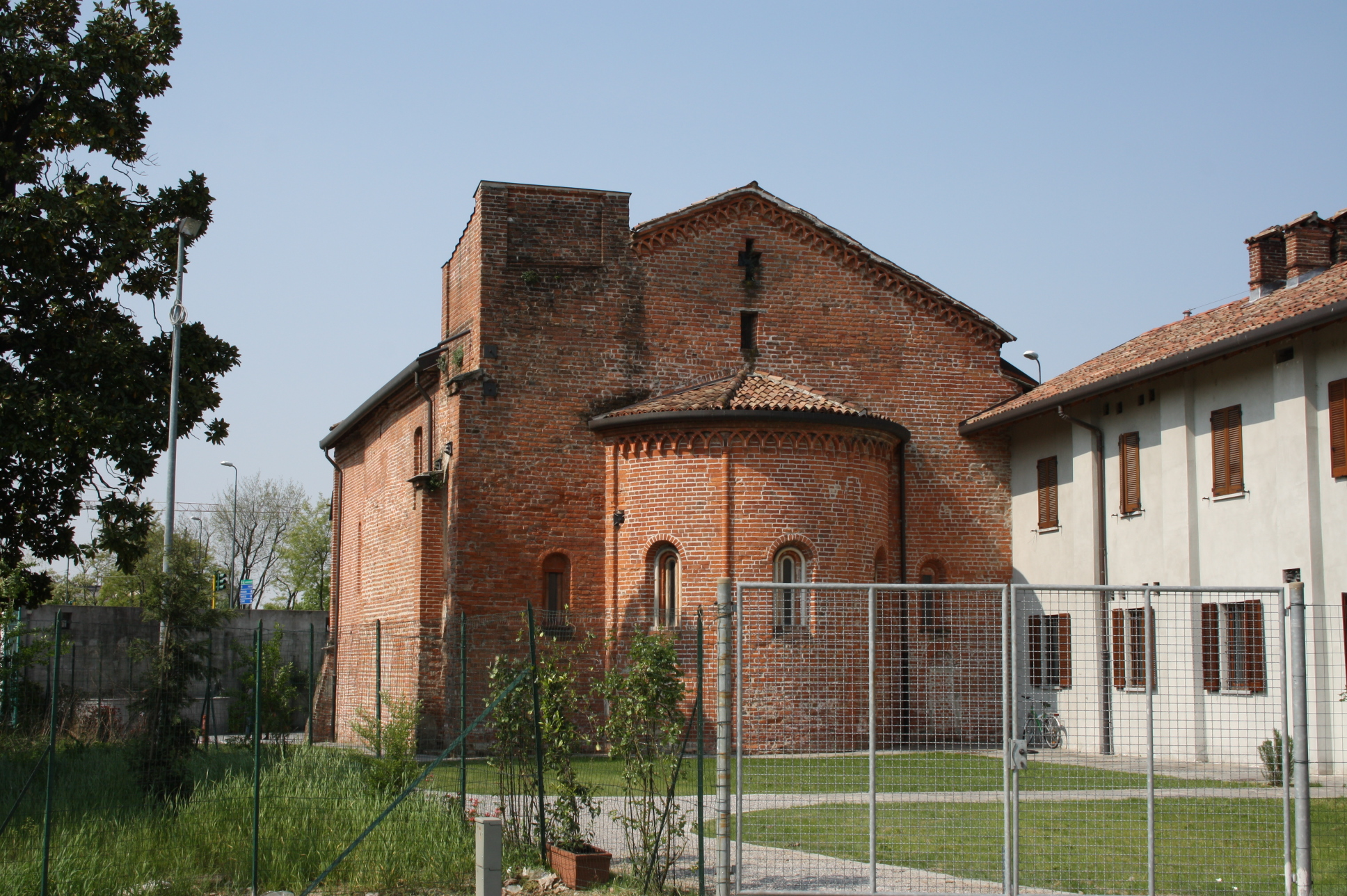
- The apse of the church.

Religion
- Affiliation: Roman Catholic
- Province: Milan
- Year consecrated: 1932
- Status: Active

Location
- Location: Milan, Italy
- Interactive map of Church of Saint Mary la Rossa (Chiesa di Santa Maria Annunciata in Chiesa Rossa)

Architecture
- Type: Church
- Style: Modern
- Groundbreaking: 1926
- Completed: 1960

Santa Maria la Rossa is an ancient church in Milan, Italy.

Excavations at the site, suggest a structure was present at the site since the early Roman Imperial era. Evidence shows that reconstructions occurred in the first centuries of the common era. However the first historical references to a basilica church of Santa Maria ad Fonticulum or Santa Maria di Fonteggio, at this site date to the 10th century. In the 12th century a monastery of Benedictine nuns was attached. A major reconstruction of the church took place in the 14th century. Recent reconstructions have eliminated all but ancient decorations, the church is now occupied by a Franciscan order.
