= San Nicolao, Milan =

Church in Milan, Italy

Coordinates: 45°27′59″N 9°10′37″E

Church of Saint Nicolao (Chiesa di San Nicolao)
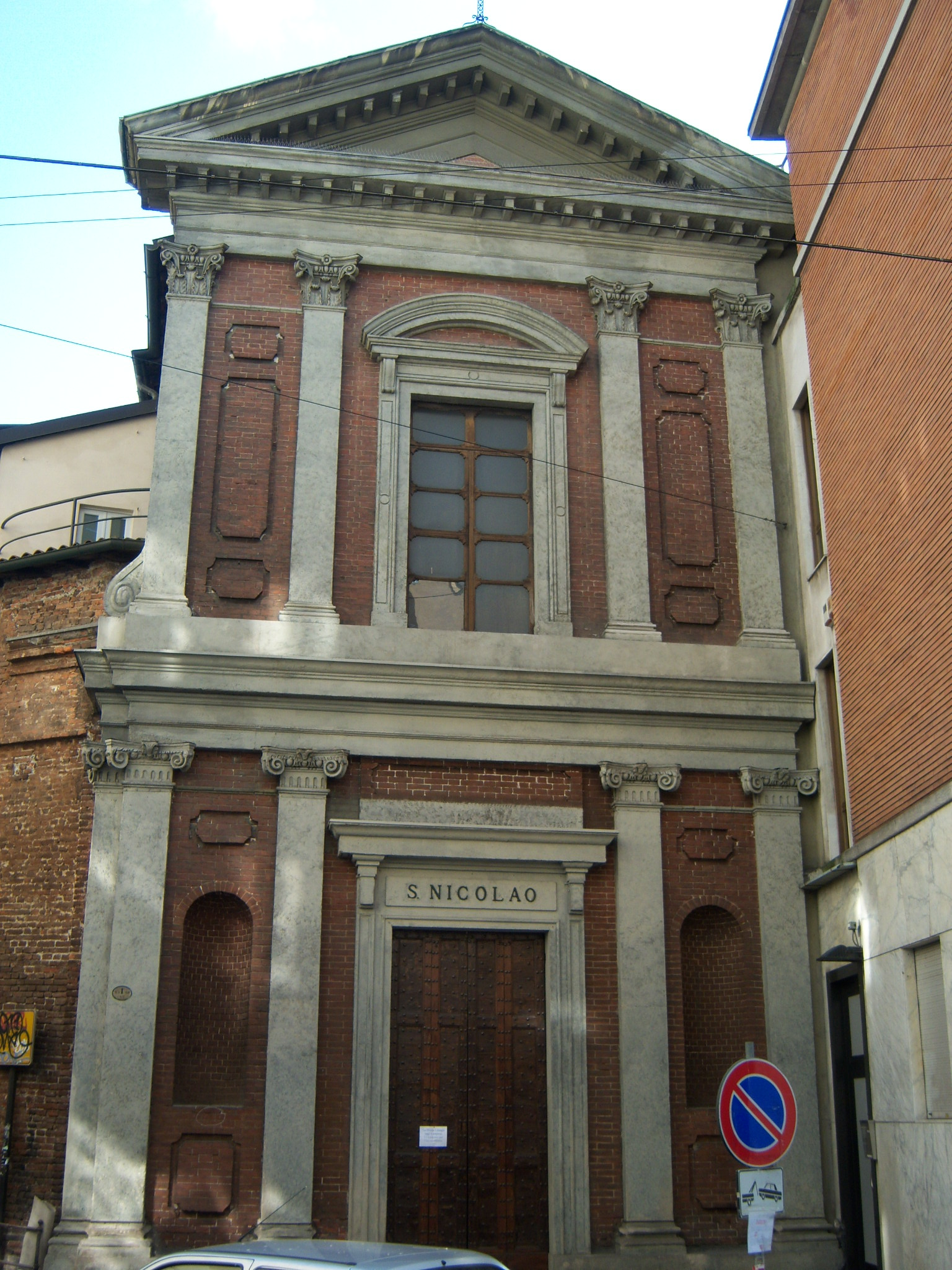
- Façade of the church.

Religion
- Affiliation: Roman Catholic
- Province: Milan
- Status: Active

Location
- Location: Milan, Italy
- Interactive map of Church of Saint Nicolao (Chiesa di San Nicolao)

Architecture
- Type: Church
- Style: Baroque
- Groundbreaking: Before 1259
- Completed: 1725

The Chiesa di San Nicolao is a church in Milan, Italy. It was completed in 1725.
