= Angelo Monticelli =

Italian painter

Angelo Monticelli (1778–1837) was an Italian neoclassical painter.

He was a pupil of Andrea Appiani. He painted the second sipario or curtain for La Scala Theatre in Milan (1821), as well as for the theatre in Pesaro.

The painter Angiolo Monticelli (1678–1749) is stated as a Bolognese landscape painter, who studied under Marcantonio Franceschini. It is unclear if he was related to either this Angelo or to Andrea Monticelli.

== Gallery ==
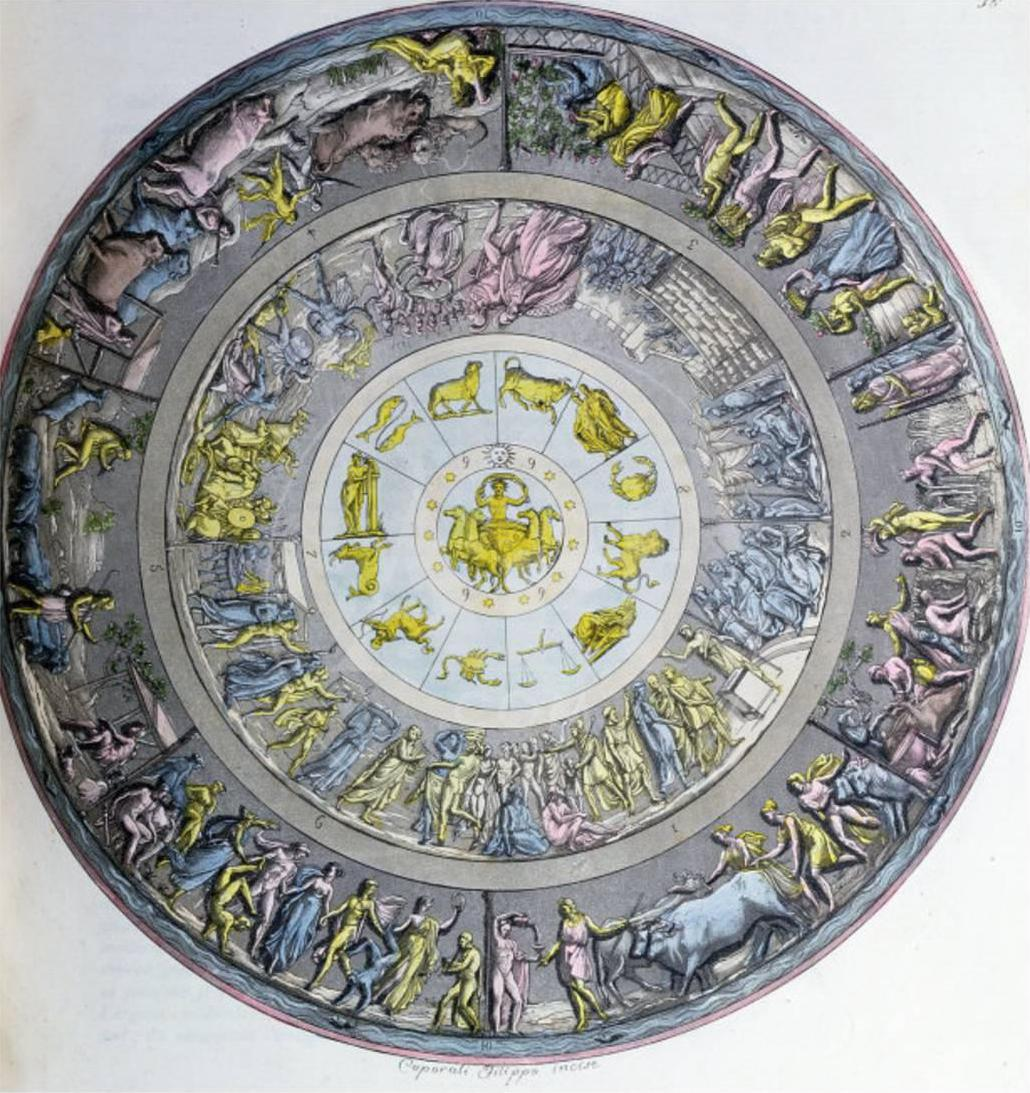
An interpretation of the Shield of Achilles design described in the Iliad, by Angelo Monticelli
