= San Gioachimo, Milan =

San Gioachimo
- Chiesa di San Gioachimo (Italian)
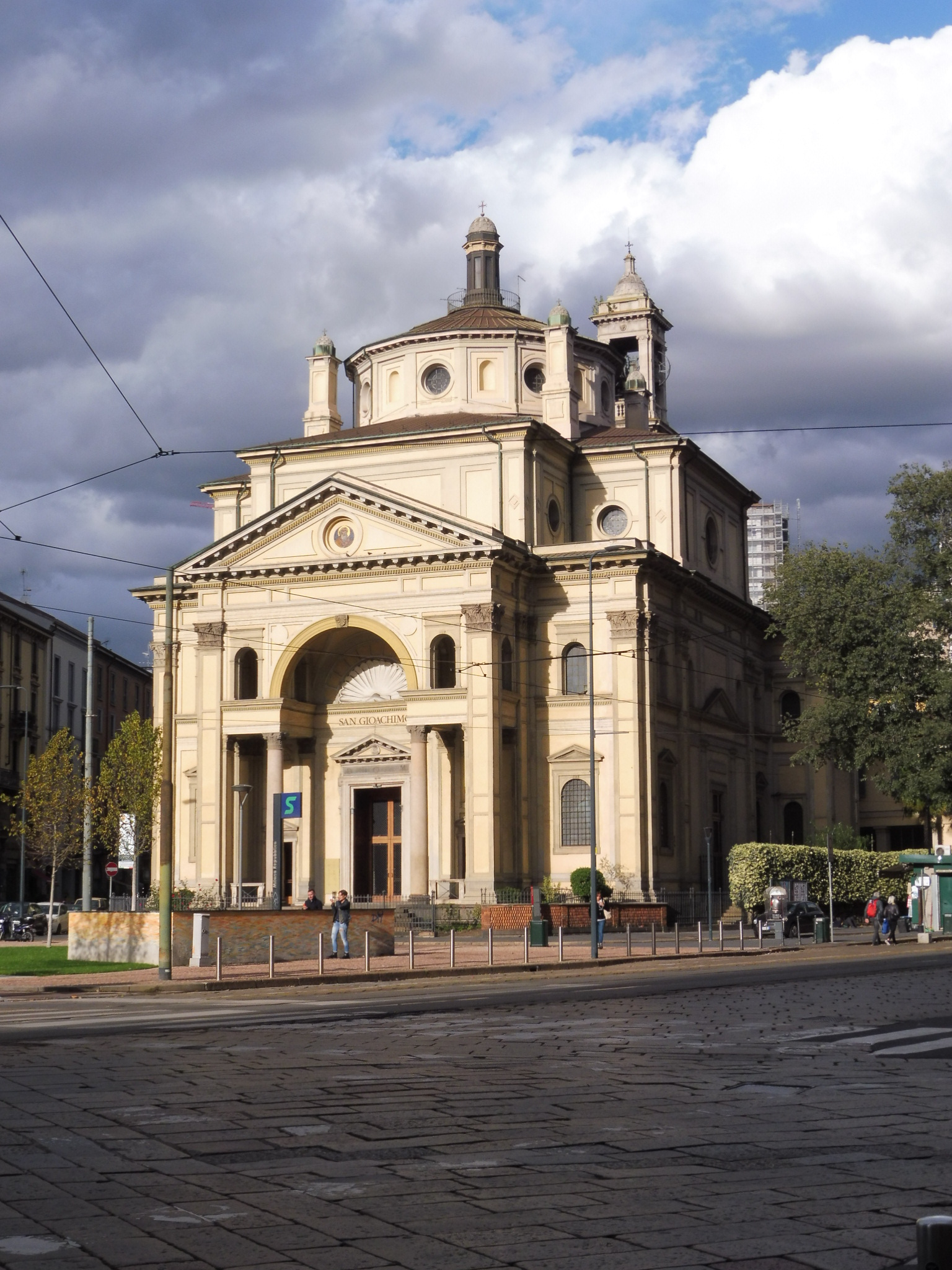
- San Gioachimo, Milan in 2018
- Click on the map for a fullscreen view
- 45°28′54.02″N 9°11′52.44″E
- Country: Italy
- Denomination: Roman Catholic

Architecture
- Functional status: Active

Administration
- Diocese: Archdiocese of Milan

San Gioachimo is a Roman Catholic church located in Milan, Italy.

== History ==
The church was commissioned by Archbishop Luigi Nazari di Calabiana and built between 1880 and 1885 behind Milan’s first central railway station. It was designed by architect Enrico Terzaghi. Between 1922 and 1931, the interior underwent significant renovations, including decorative works in the chapels of the Madonna del Suffragio and Saint Joachim by artists such as Maragliano, Broccardi, Passerini, Magistretti, and later Mario Alberella.

In 1985, liturgical updates were carried out by architect Lella Ronchi Camagni. In 2011, the five wooden entrance doors were restored by the Mauro Spinelli workshop.

== Description ==
The church features a Neo-Renaissance style and a square plan developed around a Greek cross.
