= San Bernardino alle Monache =

Church in Milan, Italy

Coordinates: 45.4603°N 9.1785°E

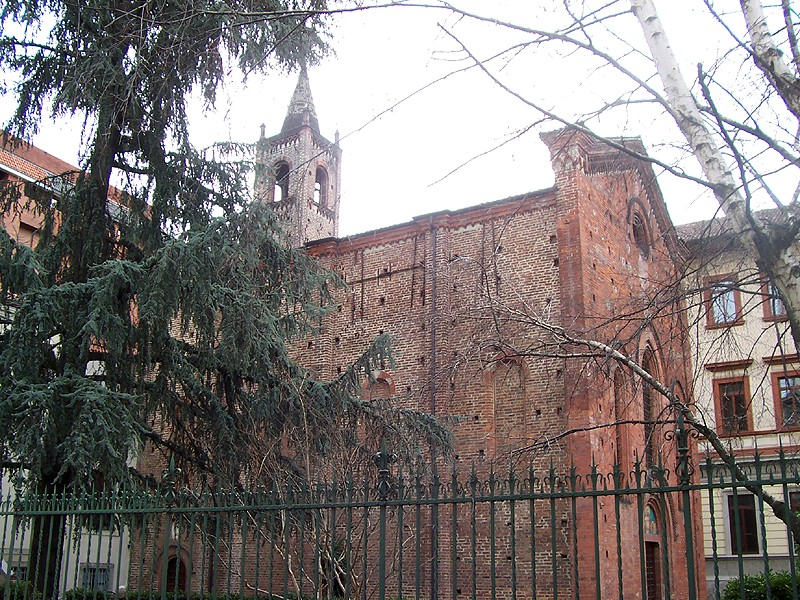

San Bernardino alle Monache is a church built in the late Gothic style of the 15th century and situated on Via Lanzone 13 in central Milan, Italy. It was originally a chapel within the nunnery of St Bernard which no longer exists. The church was built around 1447 to designs by Pietro Antonio Solari. The interior contains frescoes from the 15th century. Some are attributed to Vincenzo Foppa. The church was restored in the last century.
