= List of tallest buildings in Italy =

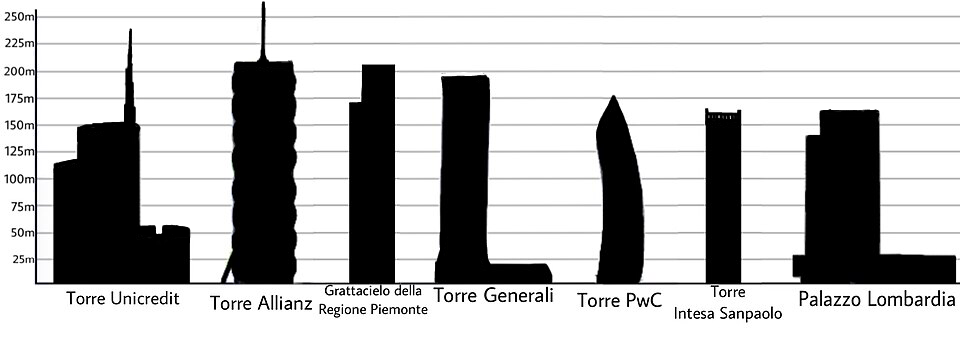
Tallest buildings in Italy

This lists ranks the tallest completed and topped out buildings in Italy that stand at least 100 m (330 ft) tall, based on standard height measurement. This includes spires and architectural details but does not include antenna masts. Only habitable buildings are ranked, which excludes radio masts and towers, observation towers, steeples, chimneys and other tall architectural structures.

== Overview ==
Even though it is well known for famous ancient structures, Italy played a key role as precursor in the construction of the first modern skyscrapers in Europe. The history of skyscrapers in Italy began with the completion of Torrione INA in Brescia. The tower is 58 m (190 ft) high and was completed in 1932. Torre Piacentini (110 m/ 360 ft) in Genoa was the tallest high rise building in Europe from 1940 to 1952 as well as the first one whose roof reached and exceeded the height of 100 metres. After 1952, Italy lost the record in Europe but it continued to have the tallest buildings in the European Union until 1966, with three different skyscrapers: Torre Breda (117 m/ 385 ft), Grattacielo di Cesenatico (118 m/ 390 ft) and Pirelli Tower (128 m/ 420 ft).

Italy's first business district, the Centro Direzionale, opened in 1962 in Milan. Today, there are 6 business districts in Italy. The construction of high rise buildings was interrupted in the 1970s and 1980s, and restarted from 1990 onwards, mainly in Naples and Milan, but also in Rome, Brescia, Genoa and Turin. Nevertheless, only Milan and Naples have developed a skyline of high-rise buildings and skyscrapers in their city centres.

== Tallest completed and topped-out buildings ==
Was the tallest building in Italy upon completion

This list includes the +100 m (330 ft) tallest completed and topped out buildings in the country.

Rank	Photo	Name	City	Height (m)	Height (ft)	Floors	Year built	Notes
1		Allianz Tower	Milan	260	860	50	2015	Tallest building in Italy from 2015.
2		Torre UniCredit	Milan	238	780	35	2011	Tallest building in Italy from 2011 to 2015.
3		Piedmont Region Headquarters	Turin	213	700	42	2022	Tallest building in Turin and in Piedmont region.
4		Generali Tower	Milan	195	640	45	2018	
5		Libeskind Tower	Milan	175	575	34	2021	
6		Torre Intesa Sanpaolo	Turin	167	550	39	2013	
7		Palazzo Lombardia	Milan	161.3	529	43	2010	Tallest building in Italy from 2010 to 2011
8		Torre Eurosky	Rome	156	512	31	2013	Tallest building in Rome, and the tallest residential building in Italy.
9		Torre Solaria	Milan	153	505	37	2013	
10		Torre Pontina	Latina	152	500	37	2010	
11		A2A Tower	Milan	146	480	32	2025	Tallest building in southern part of Milan from 2025
12		Torre Diamante	Milan	140	459	30	2012	Tallest steel building in Italy.
13		Torre Telecom Italia	Naples	129	425	33	1995	Tallest building in Naples and in Southern Italy and tallest building in Italy from 1995 to 2010.
14		Pirelli Tower	Milan	127	417	31	1960	Tallest building in Italy from 1960 to 1995.
15		Unipol Tower	Bologna	127	418	33	2012	Tallest building in Bologna and in Emilia Romagna region
16		Unipol Tower	Milan	125	410	23	2023	
17		Palazzo Sistema	Milan	126	415	28	2025	
18		Gioia 22 Tower	Milan	123	405	26	2021	
19		Torre Enel 1	Naples	122	402	33	1995	
20		Torre Enel 2	Naples	122	402	33	1995	
21		Torre Garibaldi A	Milan	121	400	25	1994	Renovated in 2010.
22		Torre Garibaldi B	Milan	121	400	25	1992	Renovated in 2010.
23		Crystal Palace	Brescia	120	396	27	1990	Tallest building in Brescia
24		Torre Europarco	Rome	120	394	35	2012	
25		Condominio Marinella II	Cesenatico	118	388	35	1958	Tallest building in EU from 1958 to 1960
26		Torre Saverio	Naples	118	387	34	1995	
27		Torre Francesco	Naples	118	387	34	1995	
28		Bosco Verticale - Torre E	Milan	118	387	24	2014	
29		Torre Breda	Milan	117	383	30	1954	Tallest Building In Italy from 1954 to 1958
30		Torre Piacentini	Genoa	116	382	31	1940	Tallest building in Europe from 1940 to 1954
31		Torre del Consiglio Regionale Campania	Naples	115	380	29	1992	
32		Torri del Tribunale di Napoli A	Naples	112	362	29	1991	
33		CityWave	Milan	112	360	24	2025	
34		Galfa Tower	Milan	110	362	28	1959	Renovated in 2019
35		Matitone	Genoa	110	360	26	1992	Tallest building in Genoa and in Liguria region
36		Torre Littoria	Turin	109	358	21	1934	Tallest building in Europe from 1934 to 1940
37		TheTris	Milan	106	350	25	2025	Tallest building in the southern area of Milan from 2025.
38		Torre Unicredit B	Milan	106	348	26	2011	
39		Torre Velasca	Milan	106	348	26	1958	In renovation.
40		Torre San Vincenzo Genoa	Genoa	105	344	27	1967	
41		Torre di piazza Turati	Milan	104	340	28	1965	
42		Ambassador's Palace Hotel	Naples	103	338	30	1957	
43		Torre Gioia 20	Milan	102	335	25	2025	
44		World Trade Center	Genoa	102	335	25	1992	
45		Grattacielo di Rimini	Rimini	101	334	29	1959	Tallest building in Rimini.
46		Gemini Center Torre I	Milan	101	332	30	1996	Tallest building in the southern area of Milan from 1996 until 2025.
47		Gemini Center Torre II	Milan	101	332	30	1996	Tallest building in the southern area of Milan from 1996 until 2025.
48		Torre di Livorno	Livorno	100	330	26	1966	Tallest building in Livorno and in Tuscany region.
49		H4 Hotel	Milan	100	329	25	2011	
50		Torre Comparto 2	Genoa	100	328	23	2014	

== Timeline of tallest buildings ==
Photo	Name	City	Height (m)	Height (ft)	Floors	Years as tallest
	Torre Allianz	Milan	260	850	50	2015- present
	Unicredit Tower	Milan	238	780	35	2011–2015
	Palazzo Lombardia	Milan	163	535	43	2010-2011
	Torre Telecom Italia	Naples	130	428	33	1995-2010
	Pirelli Tower	Milan	128	420	31	1960-1995
	Condominio Marinella II	Cesenatico	118	388	35	1958-1960
	Torre Breda	Milan	117 (135)	385 (443)	30	1954-1958
	Torre Piacentini	Genoa	116	380	31	1940-1954
	Torre Littoria	Turin	108	355	19	1934-1940
	Torrione INA	Brescia	58	190	15	1932-1934

== Buildings under construction ==
Rank	Name	City	Height (m)	Height (ft)	Floors	Completion
1	A2A Tower	Milan	146	478	32	2026
2	Palazzo Sistema	Milan	122	405	28	2028
3	CityWave (west)	Milan	110	365	25	2026
4	Thetris	Milan	106	350	25	2026
5	Gioia 20 east	Milan	102	335	20	2026

== Approved or proposed buildings ==
Rank	Name	City	Height (m)	Height (ft)	Floors	Status
1	Porta Susa 2nd Tower	Turin	150	492	38	In project
2	Palazzo Sistema	Milan	122,5	402	26	Approved
3	Torre Botanica	Milan	110	361	25	Proposed
4	Towers of the new Mestre station	Venice	100	328	25	Proposed

== See also ==
- List of tallest buildings in Europe
- List of tallest structures in Italy
- List of tallest buildings in Rome
- List of tallest buildings in Naples
- List of tallest buildings in Bologna
- List of tallest buildings in Milan
- List of tallest buildings in Genoa
