= Caltanissetta Transmitter Station =

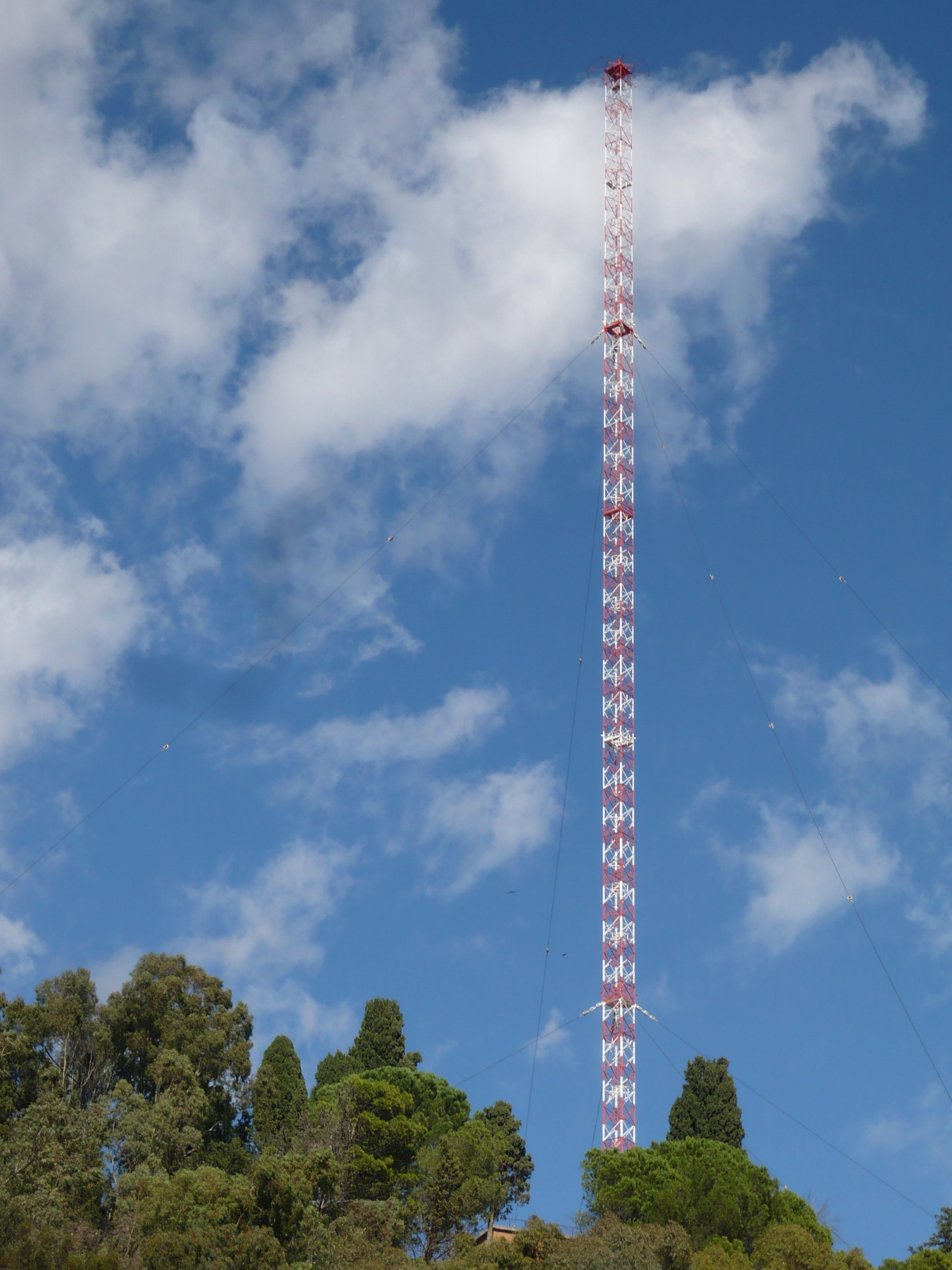
- Interactive map of the Caltanissetta Transmitter Station area

General information
- Status: Demolished
- Type: Transmitter
- Location: Caltanissetta, Sicily, Italy
- Coordinates: 37°29′52.89″N 14°04′3.98″E
- Construction started: 1949
- Completed: 1951
- Opening: November 18, 1951
- Demolished: July 23, 2025

Height
- Antenna spire: 286 metres (938 ft)

Design and construction
- Structural engineer: Ing. Bertolotti, Materonzoli and Serangelo
- Main contractor: CIFA (Compagnia Italiana Forme e Acciaio)

The Caltanissetta Transmitter Station (Italian: Trasmettitore di Caltanissetta or Antenna Rai di Caltanissetta) was a plant, then idle, for broadcast on longwave, mediumwave and shortwave; type guyed mast. The transmitter was insulated against ground.

Its main element was an omnidirectional antenna 286 meters high, which held the record for the tallest structure in Italy; it stood on a hill 689m above sea level; The top antenna was placed at above sea level.

After a series of decades-long debates on its fate and also because of its deterioration, the transmitter was demolished on 23 July 2025.

== See also ==
- List of tallest structures in Italy
- List of tallest buildings in Italy
