= Palazzo Lombardia =

Office complex in Milan, Italy

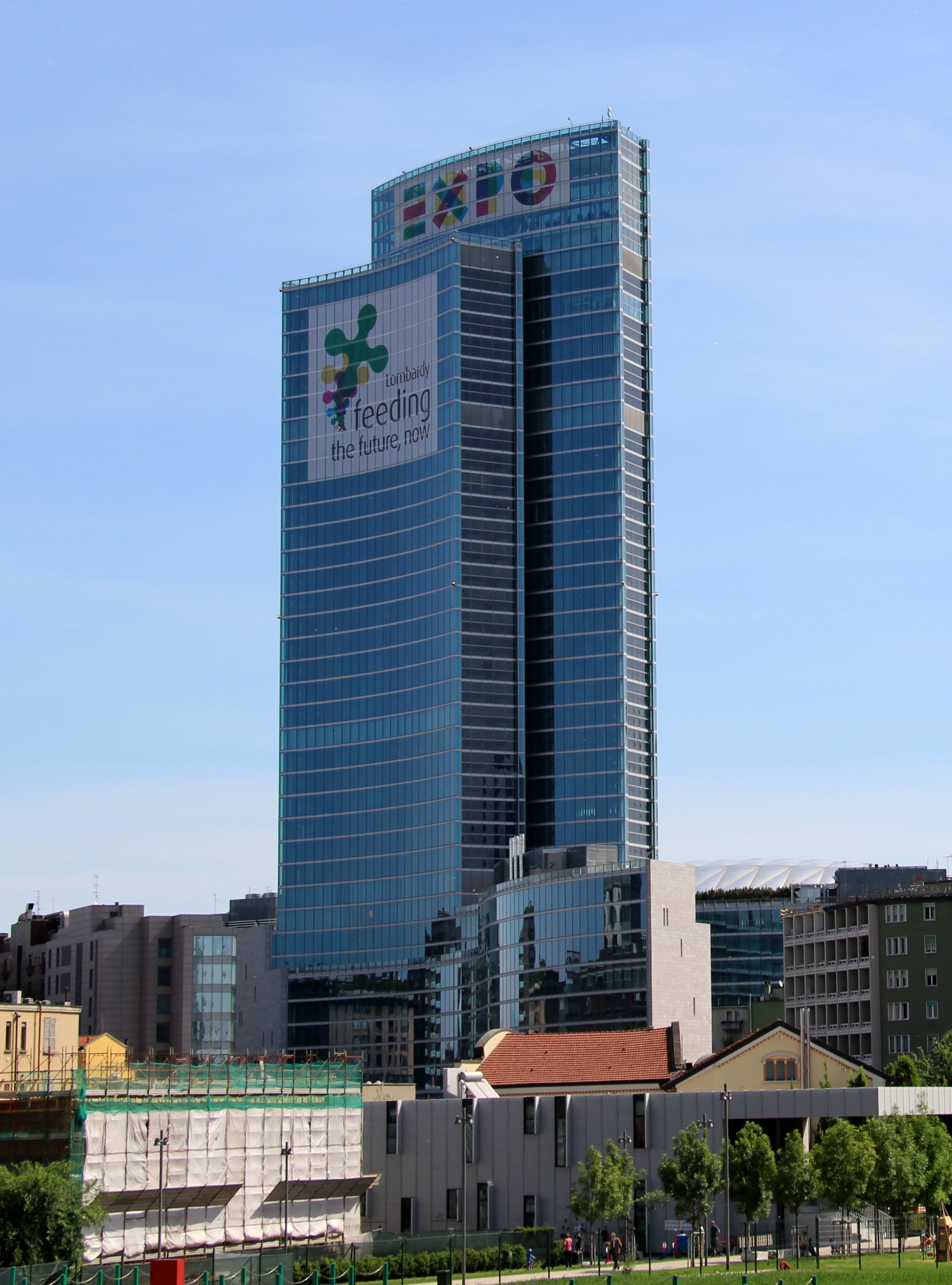
- Interactive map of the Palazzo Lombardia area
- Alternative names: Grattacielo Regione Lombardia

General information
- Status: Completed
- Type: Government offices
- Architectural style: Modernism
- Location: Via Melchiorre Gioia; Milan, Italy
- Coordinates: 45.4866°N 9.1961°E
- Completed: 23 January 2010
- Cost: €400 million
- Owner: Regione Lombardia

Height
- Roof: 161 m (528 ft)

Technical details
- Floor count: 43
- Floor area: 72,000 m^{2} (780,000 sq ft)
- Lifts/elevators: 32

Design and construction
- Architect: Pei Cobb Freed & Partners
- Developer: Infrastrutture Lombarde
- Engineer: Thornton Tomasetti
- Main contractor: Consorzio Torre

Palazzo Lombardia ("Lombardy Building") is an office complex in Milan, Italy, including a 43-storey, 161 m (528 ft) tall skyscraper. It is the main seat of the Lombardy regional government, located in the Centro Direzionale di Milano (CBD, Central Business District), north-west of the city centre.

It was first inaugurated on 22 January 2010, and officially completed on 21 March 2010. After its completion, the Regione Lombardia skyscraper was briefly the tallest skyscraper both in Milan and in Italy, being taller than both the Telecom Italia Tower in Naples and the Pirelli Tower in Milan. It lost its supremacy to the Unicredit Tower (also located in Milan) in 2011.

Palazzo Lombardia was designed by the architectural firm Pei Cobb Freed & Partners, winner of an international design competition in 2004, with Henry N. Cobb as design partner. The building won the 2012 International Architecture Award for the best new global design.

== Gallery ==
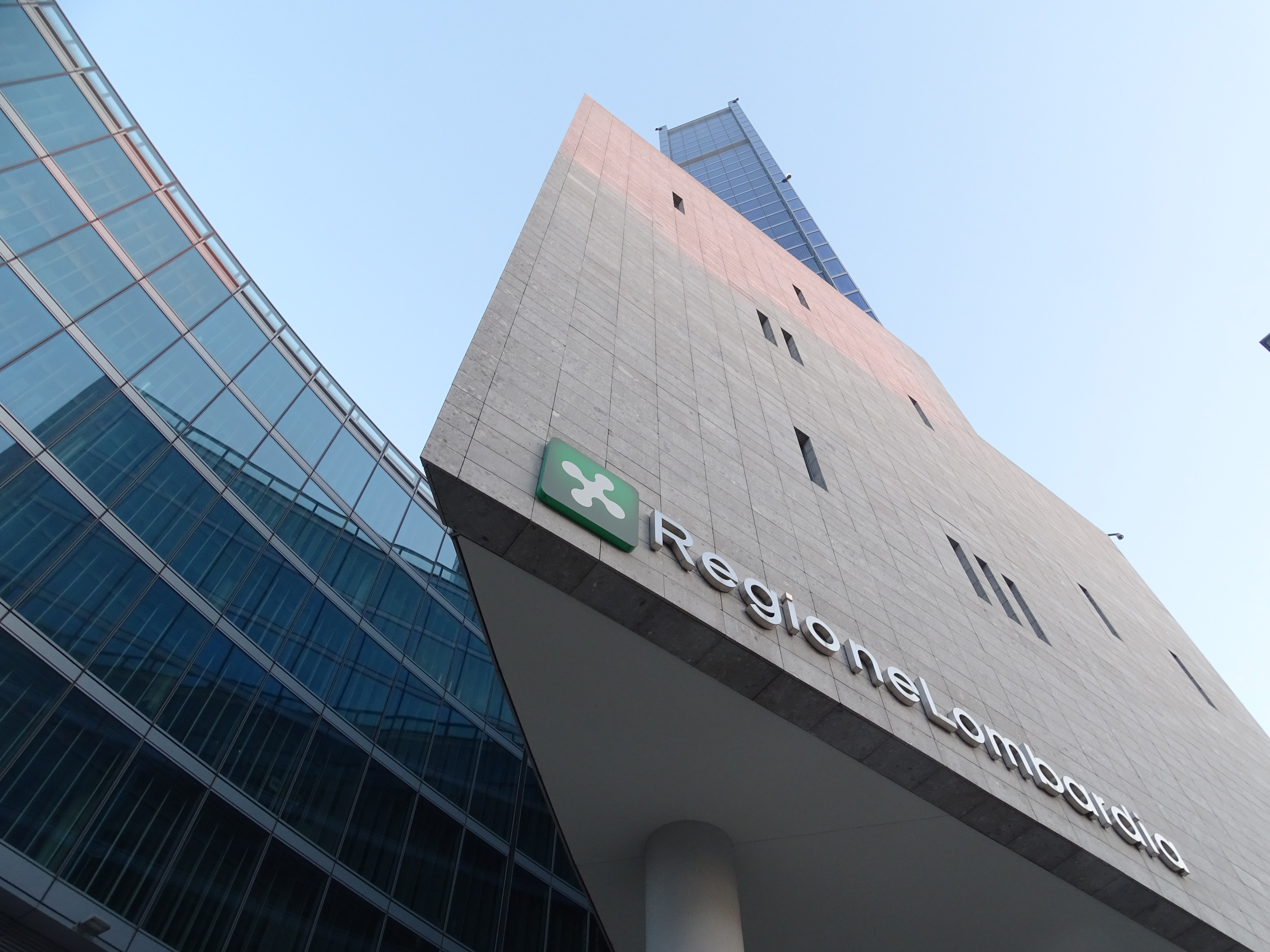
The entrance to the building.

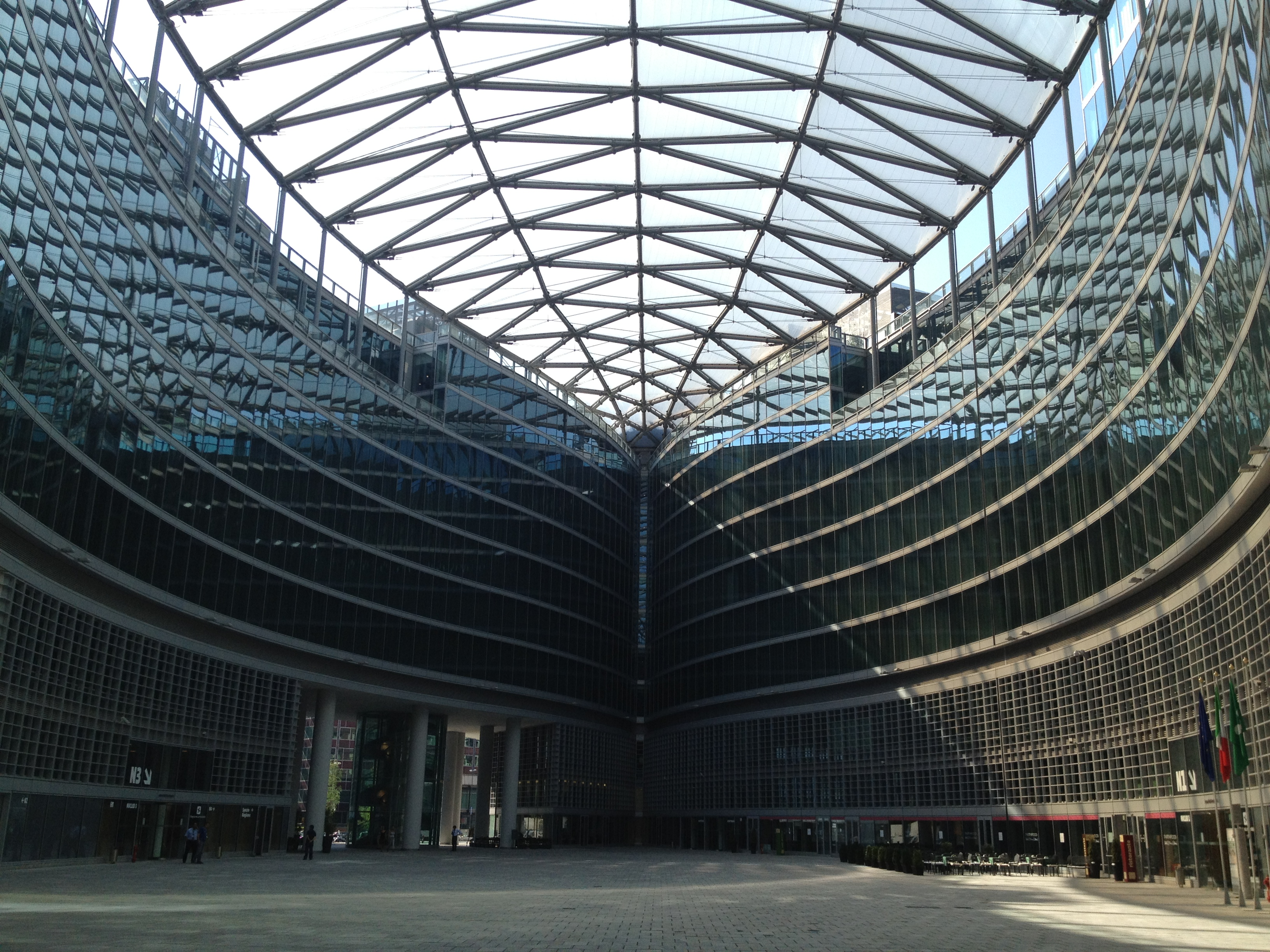
Città di Lombardia square.

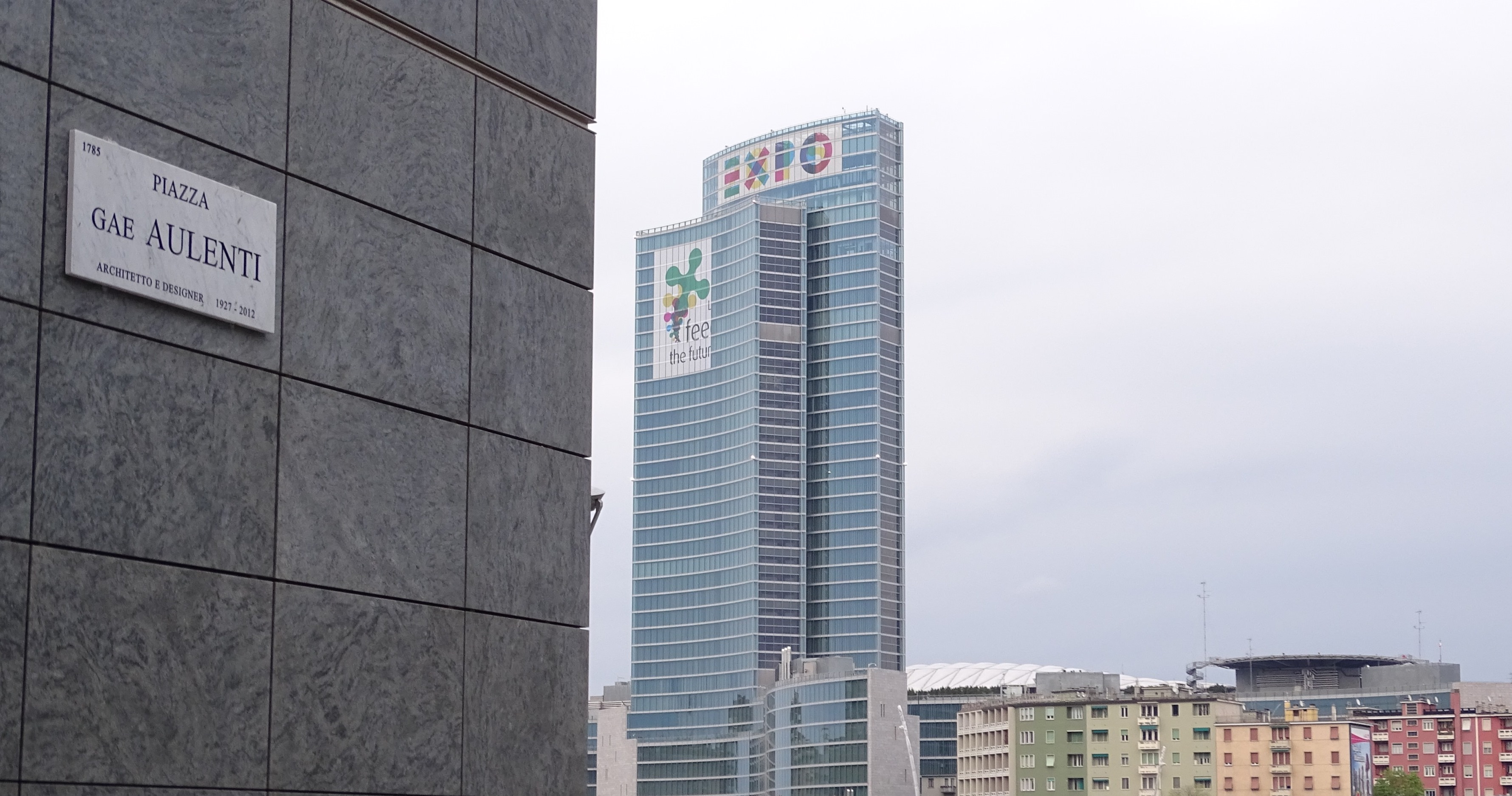
Palazzo Lombardia seen from Gae Aulenti square.

== See also ==
- List of tallest buildings in Milan
- List of tallest buildings in Italy
