= Centro direzionale di Napoli =

Business district in Naples, Italy

Coordinates: 40.8577°N 14.2816°E

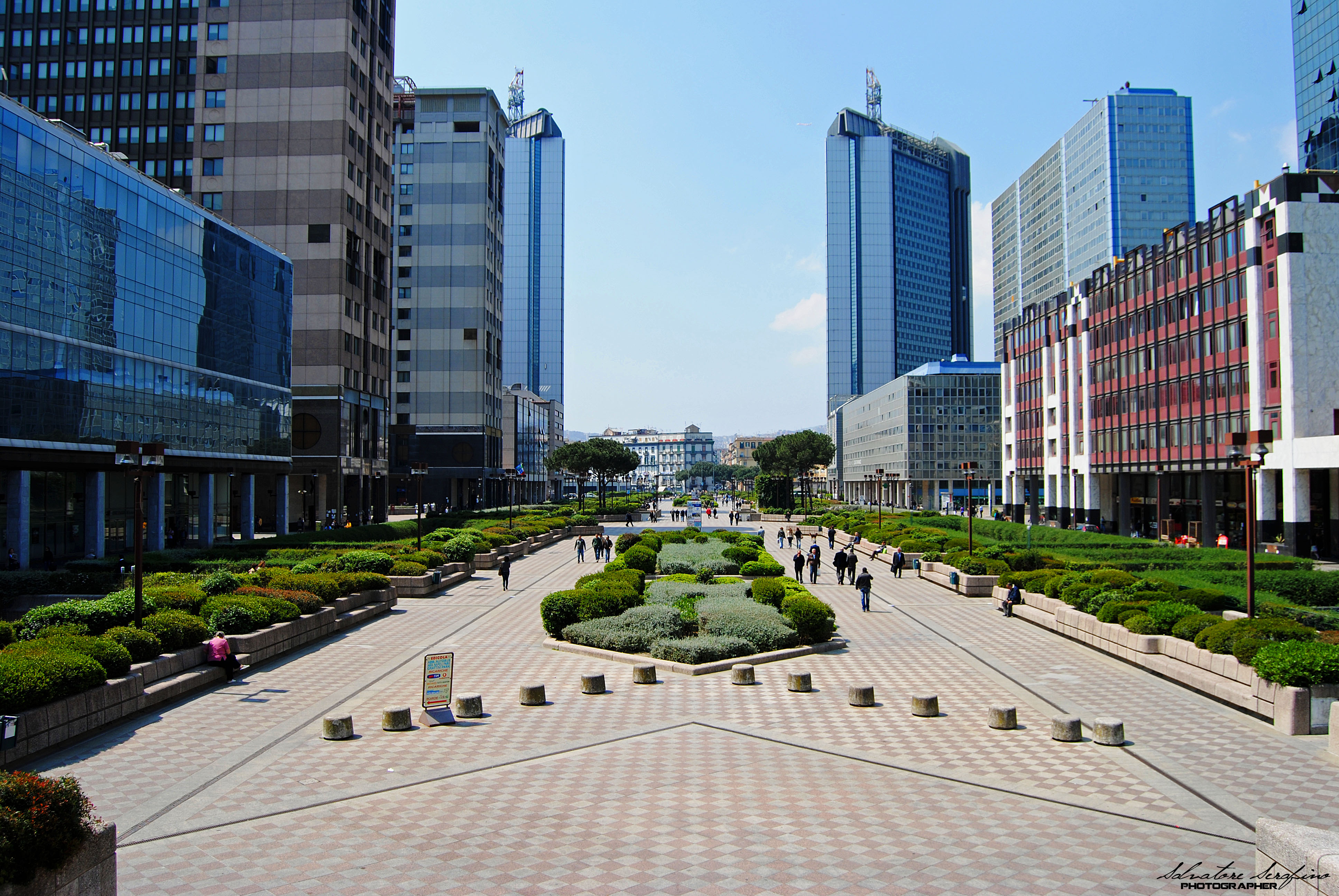
Centro direzionale of Naples

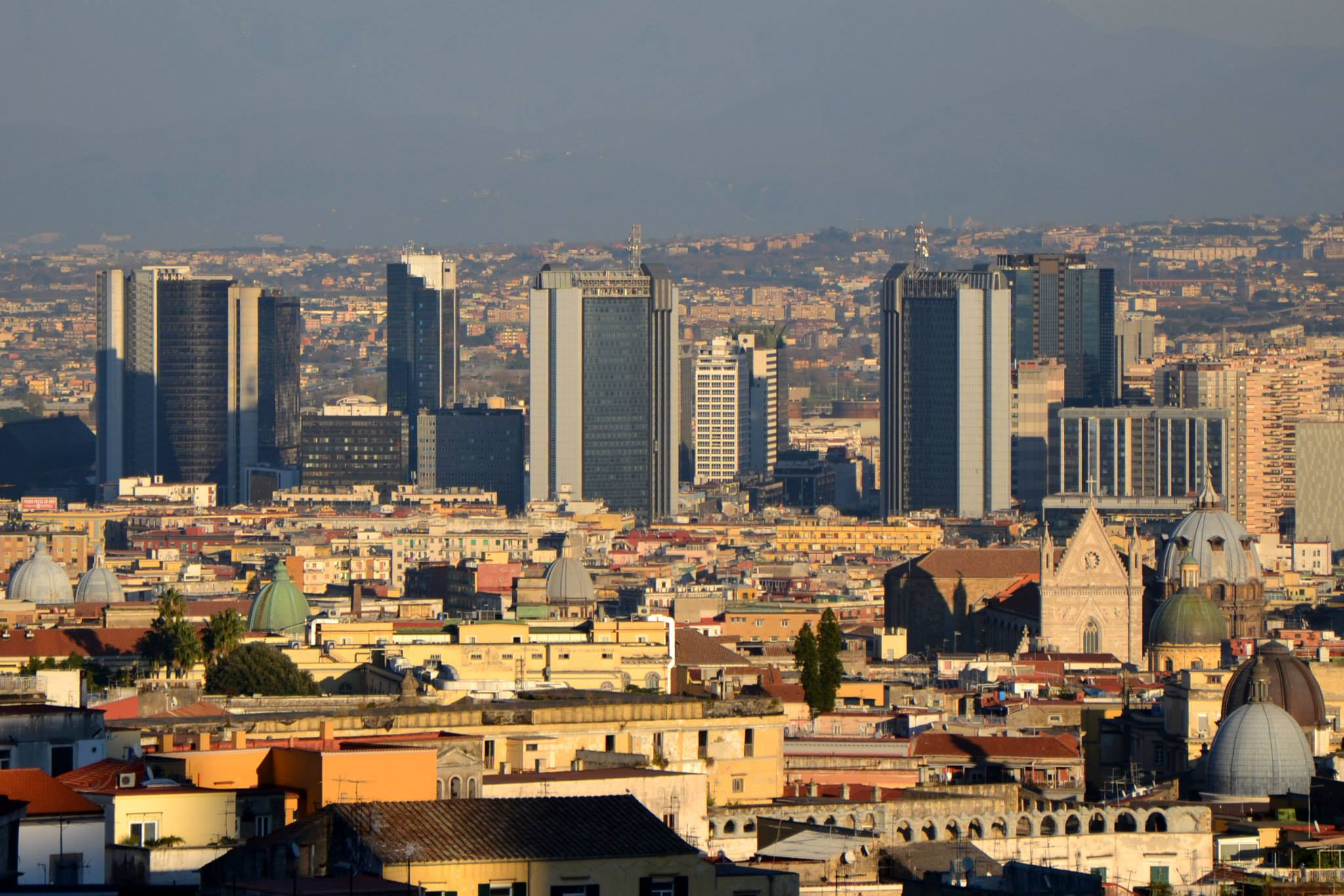
Aerial view of the Centro direzionale di Napoli

The Centro direzionale (Italian for "Managerial Center") is a business district in Naples, Italy close to the Napoli Centrale railway station. Designed by the Japanese architect Kenzō Tange, the entire complex was completed in 1995. It is the first cluster of skyscrapers to have been built in Italy or southern Europe.

== History ==
The project of the Centro direzionale dates back to 1964. It was designed in 1982 by Japanese architect Kenzo Tange.

The district’s origins date back to the mid-sixties, when the Municipality of Naples identified an abandoned industrial area of approximately 110 hectares (270 acres) to be used for the construction of a new neighborhood, mainly for office use, to relieve congestion in the city center.

After numerous projects, none of which were finally approved, in 1982 everything was entrusted to the famous Japanese architect Kenzō Tange. About three years after the presentation of his project, the construction work started.

The construction of the skyscrapers was entrusted to internationally renowned architects: among others, Renzo Piano designed the Olivetti building, Massimo Pica Ciamarra, along with a team of qualified architects, designed the two ENEL towers, and Nicola Pagliara designed the towers of the Banco di Napoli as well as the Palazzo dell'Edilres.

The realization was carried out by the company Mededil S.p.A., IRI-Italstat group.

== Structure ==
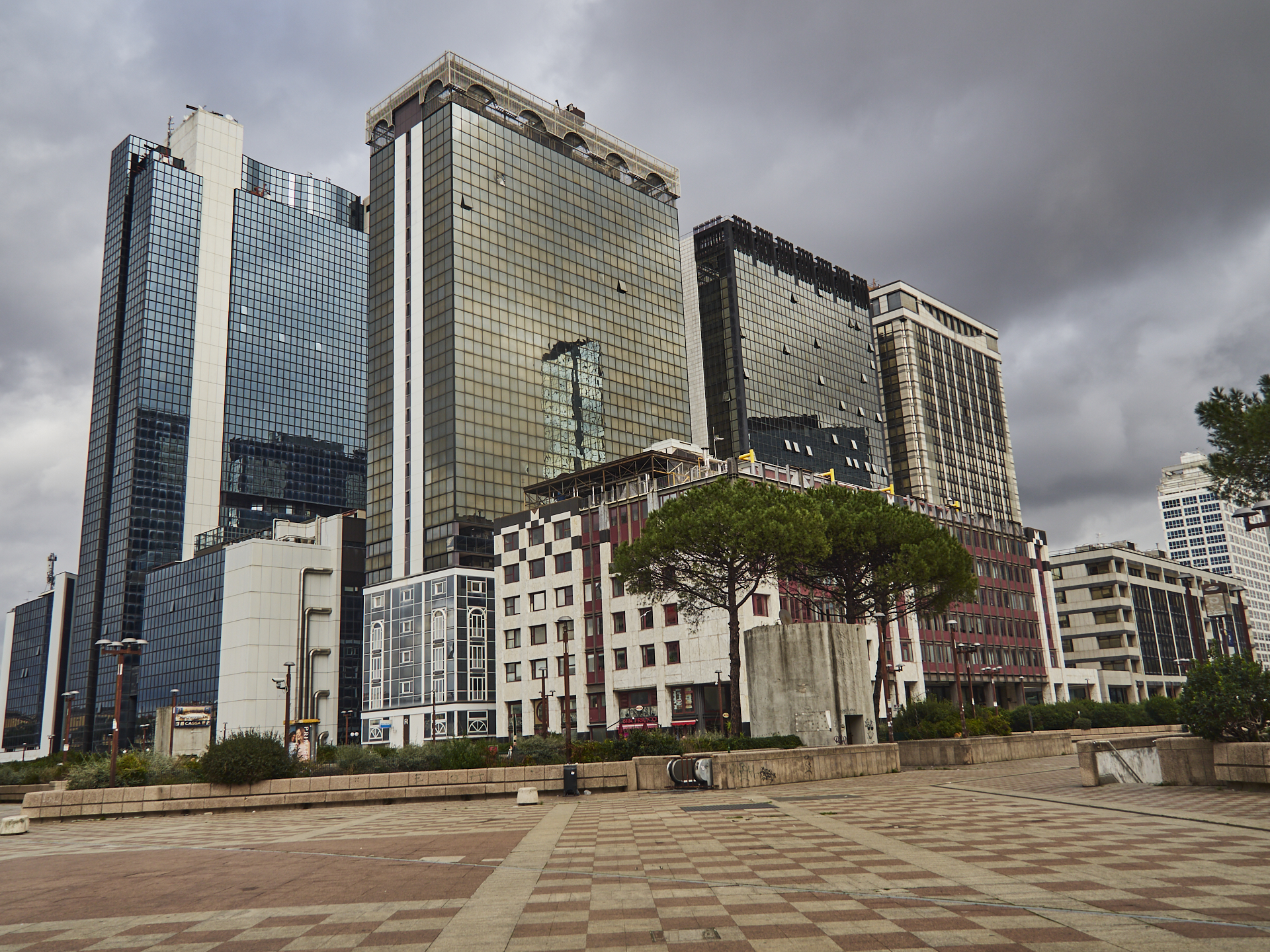
Towers

The structure is characterized by the wide road axis at the centre of the complex on which there are piazza of various shapes (circular, quadrangular, etc.) and dimensions, some of which are equipped with fountains.

Below this main street there are numerous parking lots, escalators and road arteries serving the traffic connecting the most peripheral part of the architectural complex with the city centre.

The Telecom Italia Tower at 129 metres in height, is the tallest building in southern Italy, and the ninth tallest building in Italy. For 15 years, from 1995 to 2010 it was the tallest building in Italy, exceeding by 2 metres the Pirellone of Milan.

Seen from the Vomero hill, the entire complex appears in marked contrast to the antiquities of the historic centre of Naples and with Vesuvius in the background.

The management center also houses the new headquarters of the Faculty of Engineering and Science and Technology of the University of Naples "Parthenope".

The center is one of the most extensive and important city works built in recent decades. Inspired by the ideas of Le Corbusier, represents a first positive example of clear separation between underground car traffic and surface pedestrian area.

The whole complex is said to bring a tone of renewal and modernity to the city, revitalizing the skyline. It is considered one of the most extensive and impressive urban agglomerations of skyscrapers in southern Europe to date.

The area has become attractive to companies, allowing them to effectively interface with each other in a single complex dedicated to business.

== Location ==
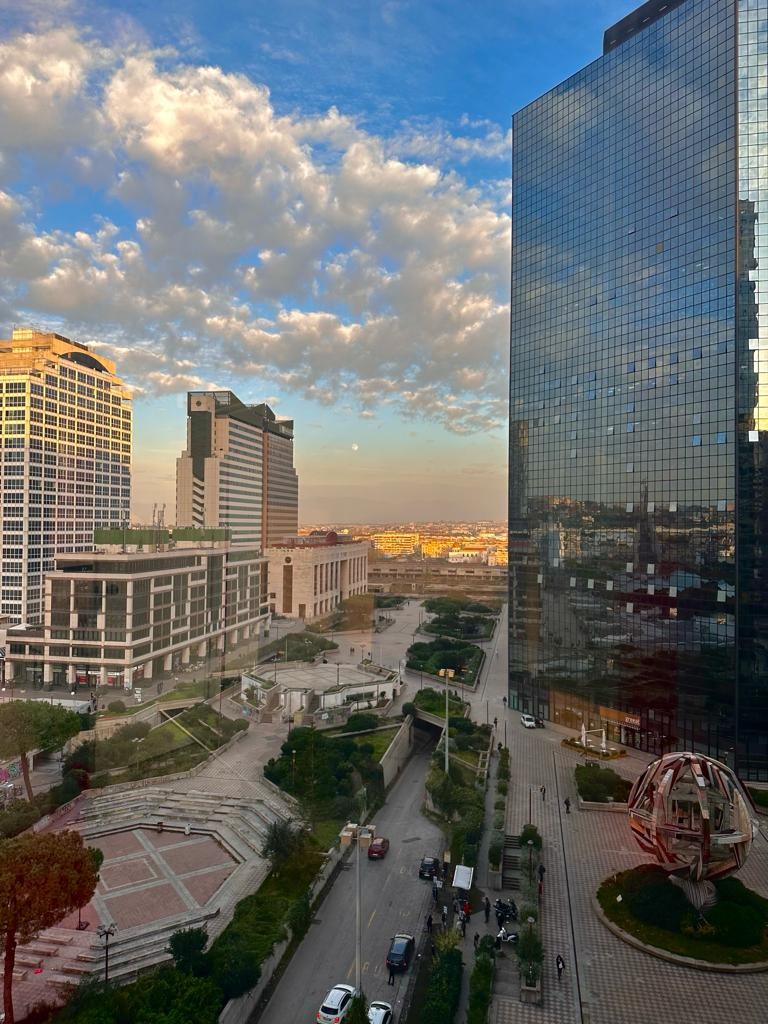
Constitution Avenue

The complex is located in Naples between the central station, Vicaria side, and Piazza Nazionale. Although the structure is entirely within the Poggioreale district, there is a Polizia di Stato station called "Vasto - Arenaccia".

The center is accessible from Via Giovanni Porzio, a road that runs from Corso Malta to Corso Meridionale, making a corner with this and Via Taddeo da Sessa: this is the main entrance to the district, so much so that the most used address for correspondence is "via Giovanni Porzio, 4.” This number seems to be arbitrary, because it is not posted anywhere and because on the office building on the same side of the street there is nothing.

The area can also be accessed from via Francesco Lauria, via Domenico Aulisio, via Costantino Grimaldi, piazza Giovanni Falcone and Paolo Borsellino (formerly piazza Enrico Cenni, which is what is shown on the street map of the City of Naples despite the change of the street sign), via Serafino Biscardi and Piazza Salerno. Some of these entrances enter directly into the structures of the new courthouse.

=== Internal naming ===
Inside the business district, most of the buildings are marked by a code consisting of a letter and a number, sometimes separated by a slash: the letter indicates the block, the number is the lot inside that block. The blocks range from A to G. For some buildings, names are used instead.

The district also uses its own street naming system, rather than municipal numbering. The exception is largo Kagoshima, which is the only name indicated by the Commune's official street sign, and while this name appears on the stradario (street listing) of the municipality, it is not shown on street maps, including Google's.

== Complex ==
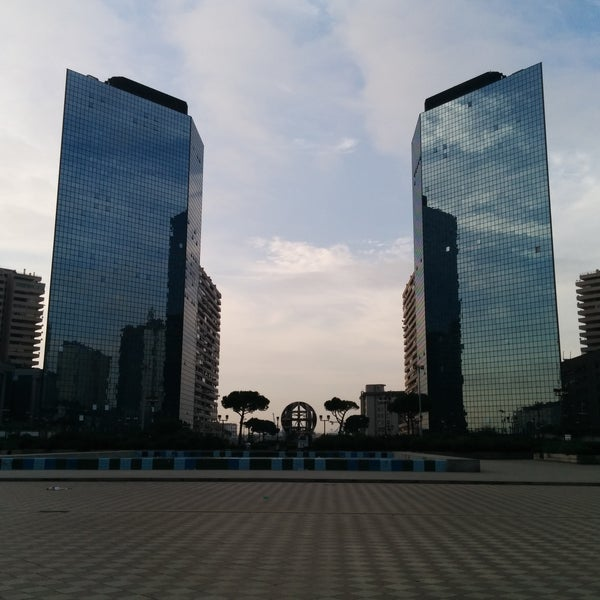
Torre Saverio and Torre Francesco

Skyscraper	Height
Torre Telecom Italia	129 metres
Torre ENEL I	122 metres
Torre ENEL II	122 metres
Torre Francesco	118 metres
Torre Saverio	118 metres
Torre del Consiglio Regionale Campania	115 metres
Torri del Tribunale di Napoli - Torre A	109 metres
Edificio Eni-Italgas	88 metres
Giunta Regione Campania	88 metres
Holiday Inn Hotel	82.6 metres
Edificio E3	75 metres
Banco di Napoli I	70 metres
Banco di Napoli II	70 metres

The ENEL Towers are often referred to as the Twin Towers of Naples due to their similarity.

== Transportation ==
The district is served by two public transport stations: the Centro Direzionale station on Naples Metro Line 1, and the Napoli Centro Direzionale on the Circumvesuviana railway.

== See also ==
- List of tallest buildings in Naples
