= Breda Tower =

- Torre Breda (Italian)
- Breda Tower in Milan
- Interactive map of the Breda Tower area
- Alternative names: in early years: Grattacielo di Milano

General information
- Type: Commercial offices
- Architectural style: International Style
- Location: Piazza della Repubblica; Milan, Italy
- Coordinates: 45°29′05″N 9°12′05″E
- Completed: 1954

Height
- Roof: 117 m (384 ft)

Technical details
- Floor count: 30

Design and construction
- Architect: Luigi Mattioni

The Breda Tower (Italian: Torre Breda) is a 30-storey, 117 m (384 ft) skyscraper in Milan, Italy. The tower was built in 1954 on a design by architects Eugenio and Ermenegildo Soncini, with Luigi Mattioni. The eight floors of the lower body are devoted exclusively to offices, while the rest of the building houses residential apartments. The building is currently under restyling.

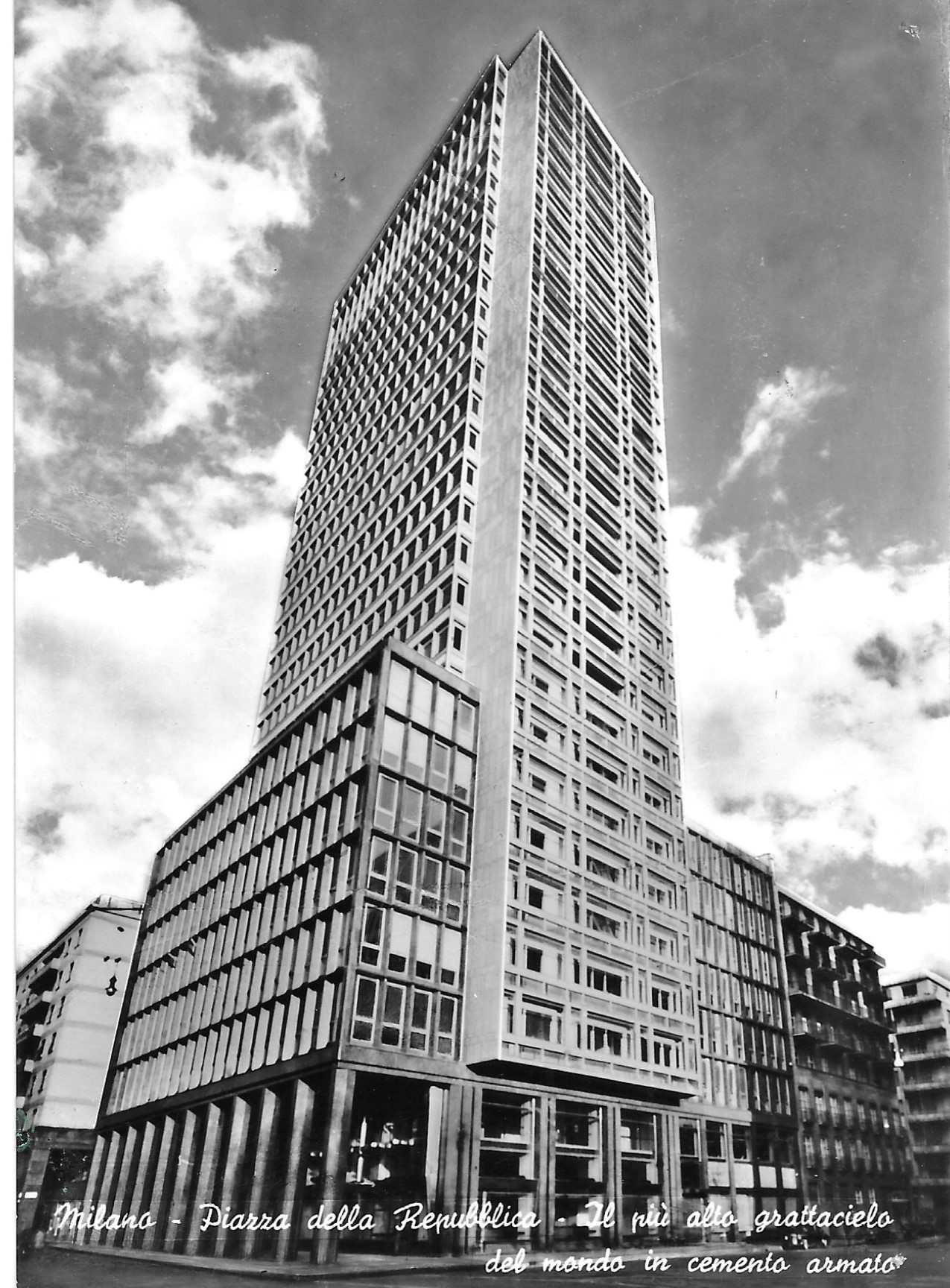
Tower in 1959

Torre Breda was the highest building in Italy when constructed, until 1960 when the 127 m (417 ft) Pirelli Tower was completed. It is now the fifth tallest building in Milan and the 13th in Italy.

== See also ==
- List of buildings in Milan
- List of tallest buildings in Italy
