= Unipol Tower =

Coordinates: 44.495531°N 11.39103°E

- Interactive map of the Unipol Tower area

General information
- Status: Completed
- Type: Office
- Location: Via Larga; Bologna, Italy
- Construction started: 2007
- Opening: 2012
- Owner: Unipol

Height
- Roof: 127 metres (417 ft)

Technical details
- Floor count: 33
- Floor area: 13,000 m^{2} (140,000 sq ft)

Design and construction
- Architect: OpenProject
- Main contractor: UNIFIMM Srl

Unipol Tower is a 33-story office skyscraper located at Via Larga in Bologna, Italy. Rising to a height of approximately 127 metres (417 ft), the building serves as the new headquarters of Unipol Bank and includes office and retail space in its 13,000 m^{2} (140,000 sq ft) square metres of floor area. Construction was completed in 2012.

Designed by architectural firm OpenProject of Bologna, Unipol Tower incorporates various environmental innovations that achieved the prestigious (LEED) gold certification.

The building is the tallest construction in Bologna and currently the 12th tallest in Italy. Previously the tallest building in Bologna was the condominium located at Via Cellini with a height of 60 metres (200 ft), holding that title since 1958.

The main project includes a mall with a fitness centre, cinema, and luxury hotel, currently under construction.

== See also ==
- List of tallest buildings in Bologna
