= List of tallest buildings in Bologna =

This list ranks buildings in Bologna buildings that stand at least 50 metres (160 ft) tall. This includes spires and architectural details but does not include antenna masts. An equal sign (=) following a rank indicates the same height between two or more buildings. The "Year" column indicates the year in which a building was completed.

== History ==
=== Medieval towers ===
Bologna, the main city of Emilia-Romagna, in Italy, was called the City of Towers or City of the Two Towers during the Middle Ages, because of the huge number of medieval towers. Some of these medieval towers can still be seen in the city. This list does not include the Asinelli Tower, built in 1119 with a height of 97.2 meters.

=== Modern towers ===
In the last decades, the city started to build more modern tall buildings, such as the 1958 "La Meridiana" building, a condominium located in Via Cellini, 70 metres (230 ft). Several modern towers, designed by the architect Kenzo Tange, were built in the Fiera District during the 1970s. In 2012, the Unipol Tower was completed. At 125 metres (410 ft), the Unipol Tower is the first skyscraper in Bologna to exceed 100 metres (330 ft) and is the tallest tower in Emilia Romagna. It is the highest building in the Bologna and currently 7th in Italy.

== List of Tallest buildings in Bologna ==
Was the tallest building in Bologna upon completion

Rank	Photo	Name	Height (m)	Floors	Year built	Notes
1		Unipol Tower	125	28	2012	
2		Frascari Tower	87	25	2014	
3		Fiera District Tower 7	73	20	1994	
4		La Meridiana Building	70	23	1958	Other names: Grattacielo Massarenti, Condominio di via Cellini, Grattacielo di San Vitale.
5		Fiera District Tower 6	78	20		
6		Fiera District Tower 5	78	19		
7		Fiera District Tower 4	78	19		
8		Fiera District Tower 3	78	19		
9		Fiera District Tower 2	78	19		
10		Fiera District Tower 1	78	19		
11		Zacchiroli Tower 1	75	20		
12		Zacchiroli Tower 2	75	20		
13		Best Western Plus Tower Hotel	70	18		ex Boscolo Hotel
14		Pilastro Tower 1	70	20		
15		Pilastro Tower 2	70	20		
16		Pilastro Tower 3	67	19		
17		Pilastro Tower 4	67	19		
18		Via E. Ferrari 40 Building	65	18		
19		Maggiore Hospital	65	15		
20		Via D. Ortolani 15 Tower 1	65	17		
21		Via D. Ortolani 17 Tower 2	65	17		
22		Via D. Ortolani 19 Tower 3	65	17		
23		Viale Masini Tower 1	65	17		
24		Viale Masini Tower 2	65	17		
25		Via De Nicola Tower 1	60	16		
26		Via De Nicola Tower 2	60	16		
27		Via De Nicola Tower 3	60	16		
28		P Tower	60	15	2018	
29		Bonaccorso Plaza	50	11	2008	One of the municipal buildings of Bologna
30		Via E. Nani Building	50	14		
31		Viale Della Repubblica Building	50	14		

== See also ==
- List of tallest buildings in Italy
