= Fiera di Bologna =

Building in Bologna, Italy

Coordinates: 44.5109°N 11.3661°E

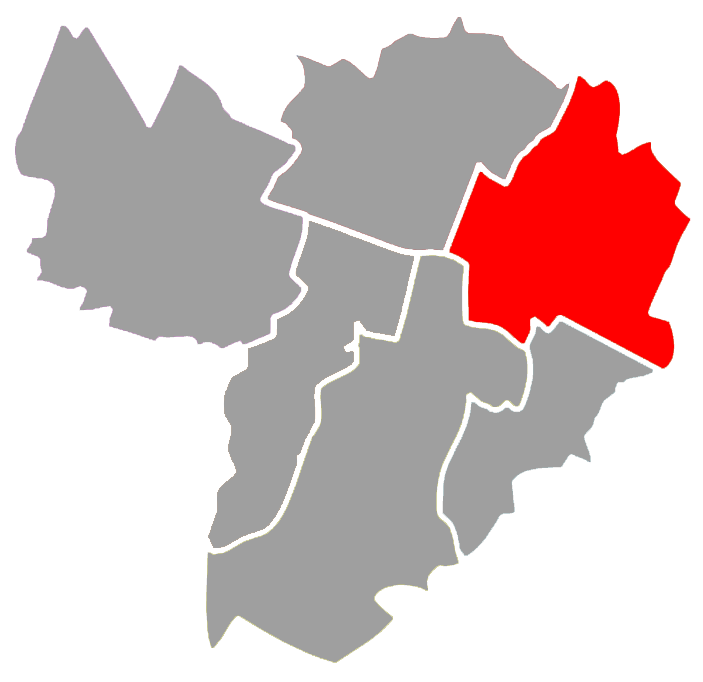
Position of San Donato-San Vitale borough in Bologna, where Fiera District is located.

The Fiera di Bologna is the business district of the city of Bologna, in central Italy. The area includes a trade exhibition centre and several office towers occupied by the regional government of Emilia-Romagna and various private companies.

== History ==
=== 19th century ===
The history of the Fiera begins in the 19th century. The first large trade fair was held in the city on May 7, 1888 in the Giardini Margherita, inaugurated by King Umberto I, Queen Margherita of Savoy and the then Prime Minister, Francesco Crispi.

=== 20th century ===
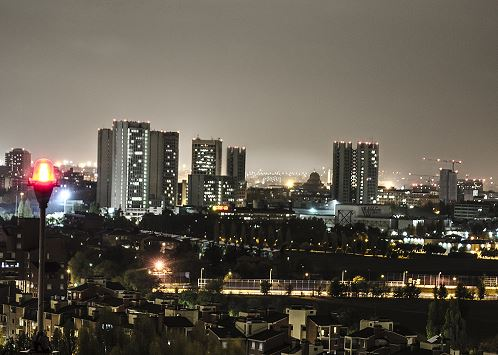
View over Fiera District.

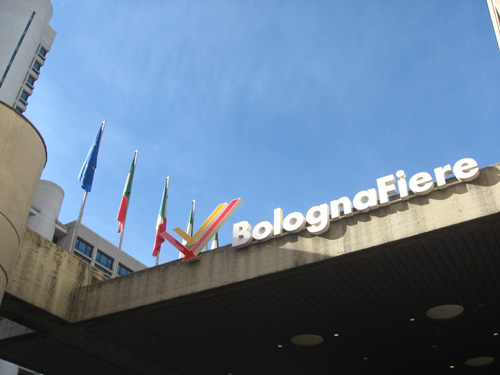
Logo of BolognaFiere on the Fair's main venue.

Trade fairs of national significance were held more constantly starting from 1927, the year in which the "Littoriale" football stadium, now Renato Dall'Ara Memorial Stadium, was built by the Fascist regime, with expositions taking place inside the stadium on a regular basis.

After WW2, in 1947, the local chamber of commerce set up the Ente Autonomo delle Fiere di Bologna; however, it didn't have a fixed location yet, but trade fairs were held between Montagnola park and Palazzo del Podestà.

In 1961 EAF launched a contest in order to select a project for a first block of permanent pavillons. The winning project was that of architects Leonardo Benevolo, Tommaso Giuralongo and Carlo Melogran; works began in 1964 and the following year the 29th Fair of Bologna, inaugurated by the then Prime Minister Aldo Moro, was the first to be held in a permanent venue.

At the end of the 1960s the city authorities, worried by massive gentrification and suburbanisation, asked Japanese starchitect Kenzo Tange to sketch a master plan for a new town north of Bologna; however, the project that came out in 1970 was evaluated as way too much ambitious and expensive. Eventually the city council, in spite of vetoing Tange's master plan, decided to keep his project for a new exhibition centre and business district. At the end of 1978 the construction of a tower block and several diverse buildings and structures started. In 1985 the headquarters of the regional government of Emilia-Romagna moved in the new district.

=== 21st century ===
In 2002 EAF turned into "BolognaFiere Spa", a joint-stock company that is the fulcrum of a regional fair system that includes also Modena and Ferrara, with a combined total of 200,000 square meters of gross hall capacity, of which 105,000 in Bologna alone.

In 2010 a new 22 story, 90 meters high tower has been completed.

At the end of 2016 BolognaFiere Spa successfully carried out a €20m seasoned equity offering with the aim to expand its exhibition grounds to 140,000 square meters. On October 30, 2017 (after the approval of a new €100m restyling project) demolition works of the old pavillons officially started.

== See also ==
- List of tallest buildings in Bologna
- Virtus Arena
