= Torre Pontina =

Skyscraper in Latina, the tallest building in the city

Coordinates: 41.81959°N 12.45763°E

- Interactive map of the Torre Pontina area

General information
- Type: Mixed-use: Residential / Office
- Location: Latina, Italy
- Construction started: 2007
- Completed: 2009
- Opened: 2010

Height
- Antenna spire: 151 m (495 ft)

Technical details
- Floor count: 37

Design and construction
- Main contractor: R.B.costruzioni s.r.l

Torre Pontina is a mixed-use skyscraper in Latina, the tallest building in the city and one of the highest residential towers in Italy. The foundation of the building was laid in 2007. The building is near the Latinafiori Shopping Center.

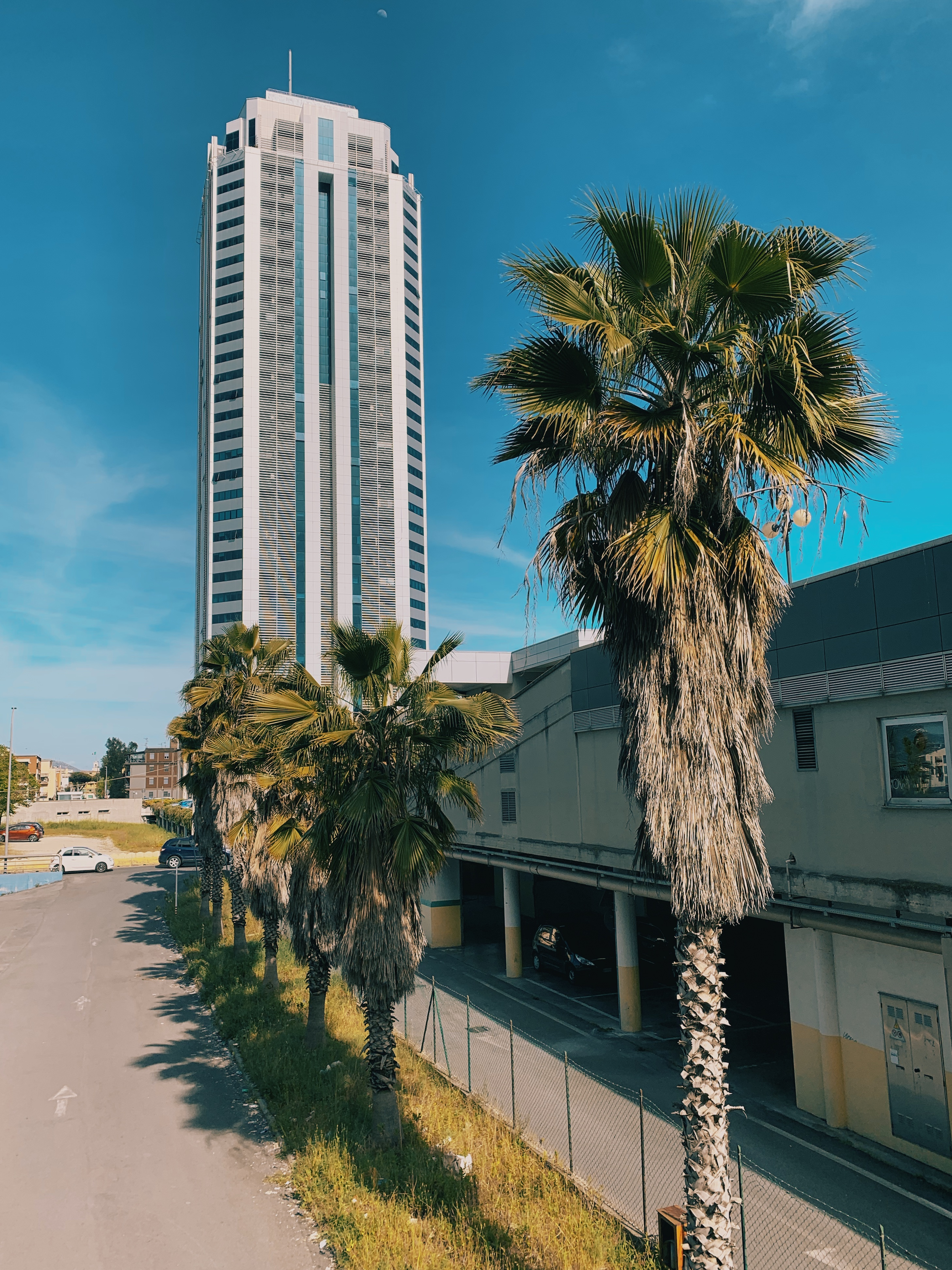
A different view of Torre Pontina.

== See also ==
- List of tallest buildings in Italy
