= Torrione INA =

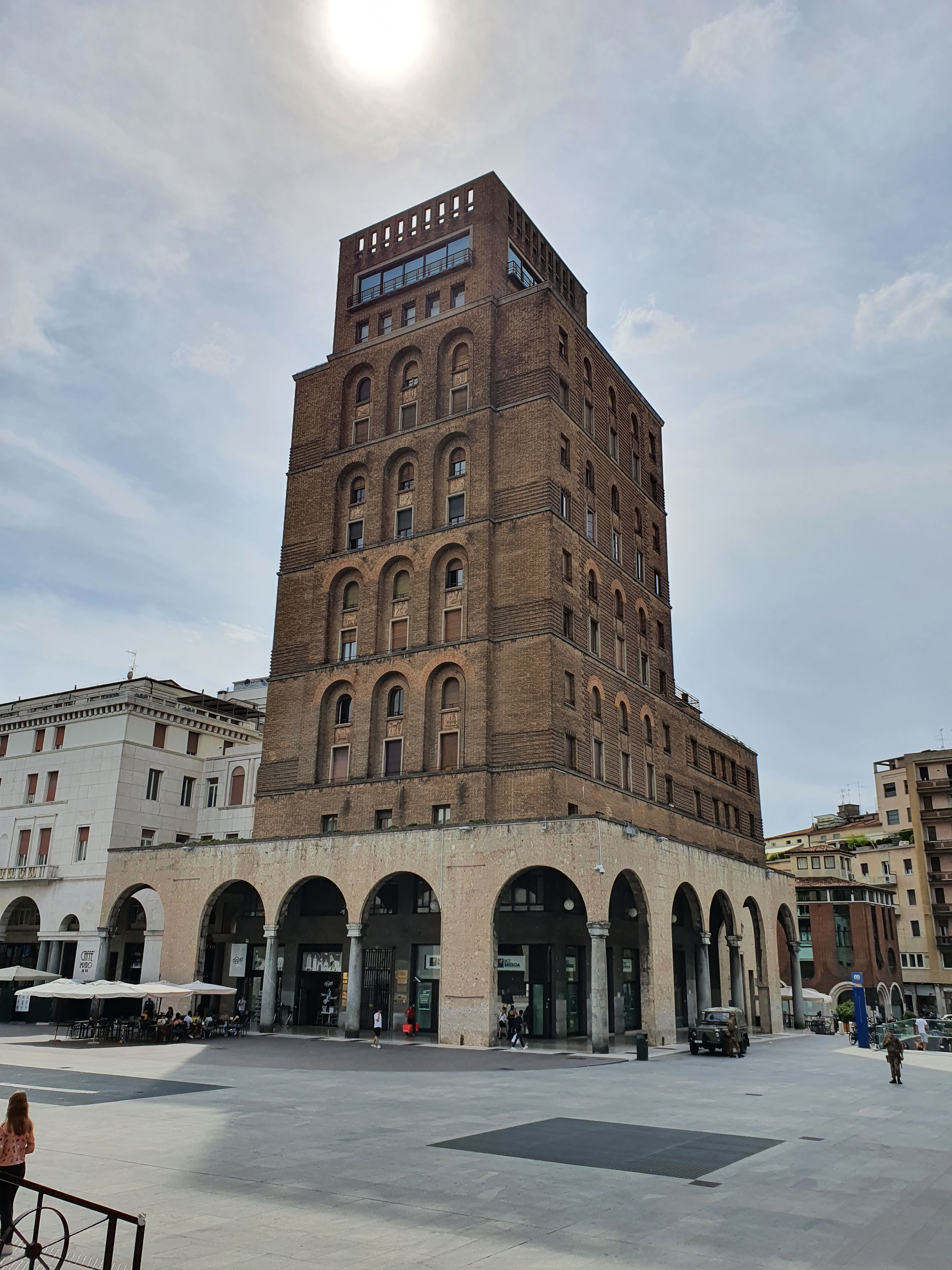
- Interactive map of the Torrione INA area
- Alternative names: Torrione

Record height
- Tallest in Italy from 1932 to 1934^{[I]}
- Surpassed by: Torre Littoria

General information
- Status: Completed
- Type: Commercial offices Residential
- Location: Piazza della Vittoria, Brescia, Italy
- Coordinates: 45°32′18.67″N 10°13′7.93″E
- Construction started: 1930
- Completed: 1932
- Opened: 1 November 1932

Height
- Roof: 57.25 m (187.8 ft)

Technical details
- Floor count: 15 (13 above ground)
- Lifts/elevators: 5

Design and construction
- Architect: Marcello Piacentini

The Torrione INA (transl. "INA Tower"), also known as Torrione or Grattacielo, is a tall building in Brescia, Italy. Built between 1930 and 1932, it is the first skyscraper in Italy and also one of the first skyscrapers in Europe. It was designed by the Italian architect Marcello Piacentini for the INA – Istituto Nazionale Assicurazioni ("National Insurance Institute"). At the time of its completion, it was the tallest concrete high-rise in Europe aside from the "Boerentoren" in Antwerp.

The tower was officially opened by Benito Mussolini on 1 November 1932. The architectural style of this building is predominantly Art Deco, with influences from Chicago School. Indeed, the Torrione INA was inspired by a project that Piacentini had submitted in 1922 for the Chicago Tribune's architectural competition.

The Torrione INA had been used as a model for other Italian skyscrapers, such as the Torre Littoria in Turin and the Torre Piacentini in Genoa.

== See also ==
- List of tallest buildings in Italy
