= Rimini Skyscraper =

Skyscraper in Rimini, Italy

- Grattacielo di Rimini (Italian)
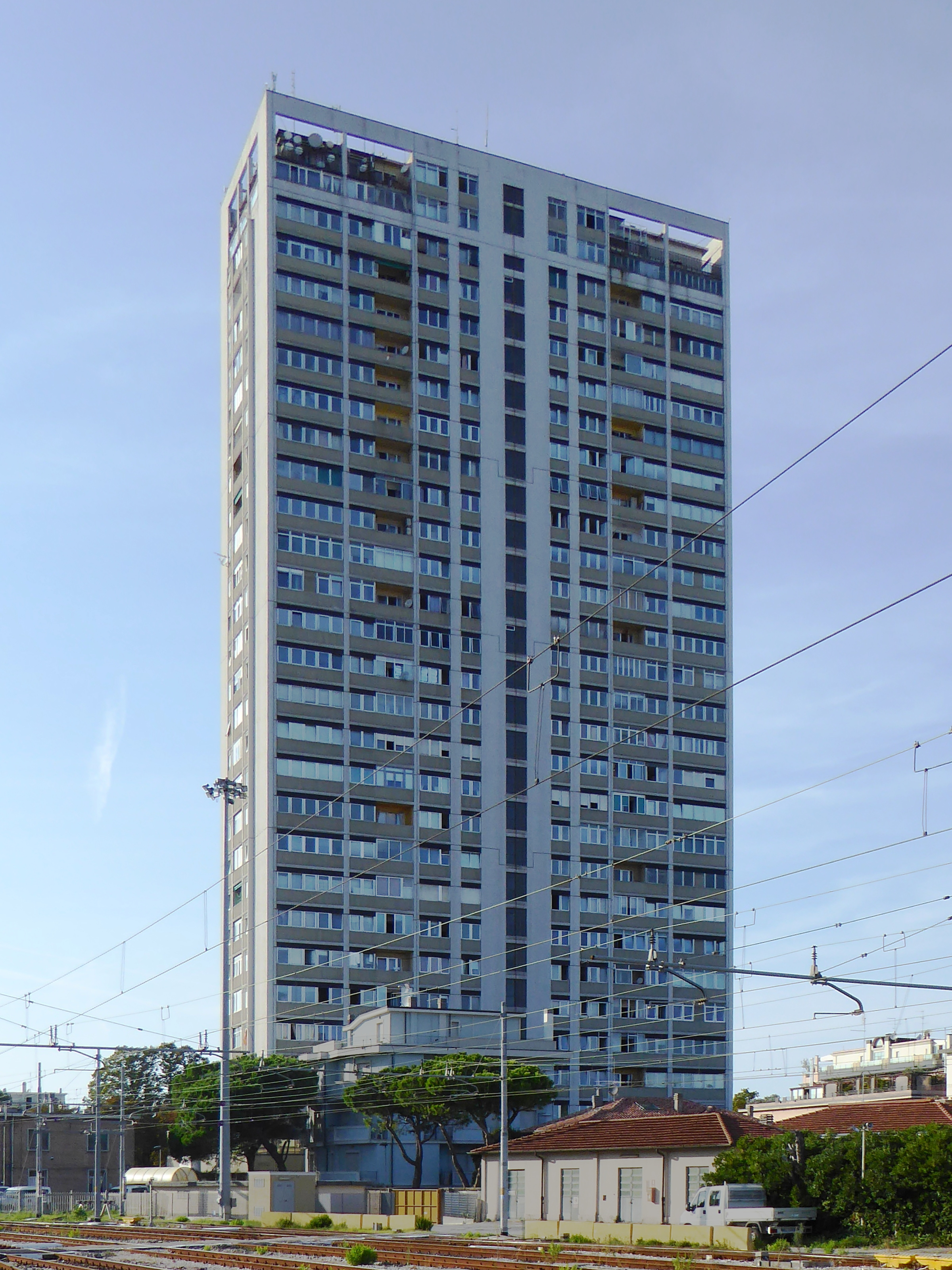
- Interactive map of the Rimini Skyscraper area

General information
- Status: Completed
- Type: Residential
- Architectural style: Rationalism
- Location: Rimini, Italy, 11 Viale Principe Amedeo, Rimini, Italy
- Coordinates: 44.06628°N 12.57175°E
- Construction started: 1957
- Completed: 1959

Height
- Roof: 101.5 m (333 ft)

Technical details
- Structural system: Concrete
- Floor count: 29

Design and construction
- Structural engineer: Raoul Puhali

The Rimini Skyscraper (Italian: Grattacielo di Rimini) is a high-rise residential building in Rimini, Italy. Built between 1957 and 1959, the tower stands at 101.5 m (333 ft) tall with 29 floors and is the current 35th tallest building in Italy as well as the tallest in Rimini.

== History ==
The first excavations for the construction of its foundations began in October 1957, while the construction works of the structure (based on a project by the Istrian engineer Raoul Puhali) ended in 1959. In 1960 the fittings of the apartments on the top floors were completed.

=== Architecture ===
It is located near the train station and about 300 meters from the beach, in a position connecting the historic center and the sea. It is about 101.50 m high and has 28 floors above ground (inhabitable from the first to the twenty-seventh), which include 180 apartments and offices, served by 6 rapid elevators capable of reaching the top floor in 50 seconds and by a service elevator, on a podium intended for various commercial establishments. In the seventies, this avant-corps housed, on the first floor, the state middle school number 4 of Rimini. It also has a 24-hour concierge, security cameras and a garage with about 70 parking spaces in the basement.

== Trivia ==
In 2017, Italian director Marco Bertozzi presented the documentary film entitled "Cinema Grattacielo" after 10 years of filming, entirely shot inside the building and interpreted by some of the inhabitants of the skyscraper in Rimini.

== See also ==
- List of tallest buildings in Italy
