= Eugenio Soncini =

Italian architect

Eugenio
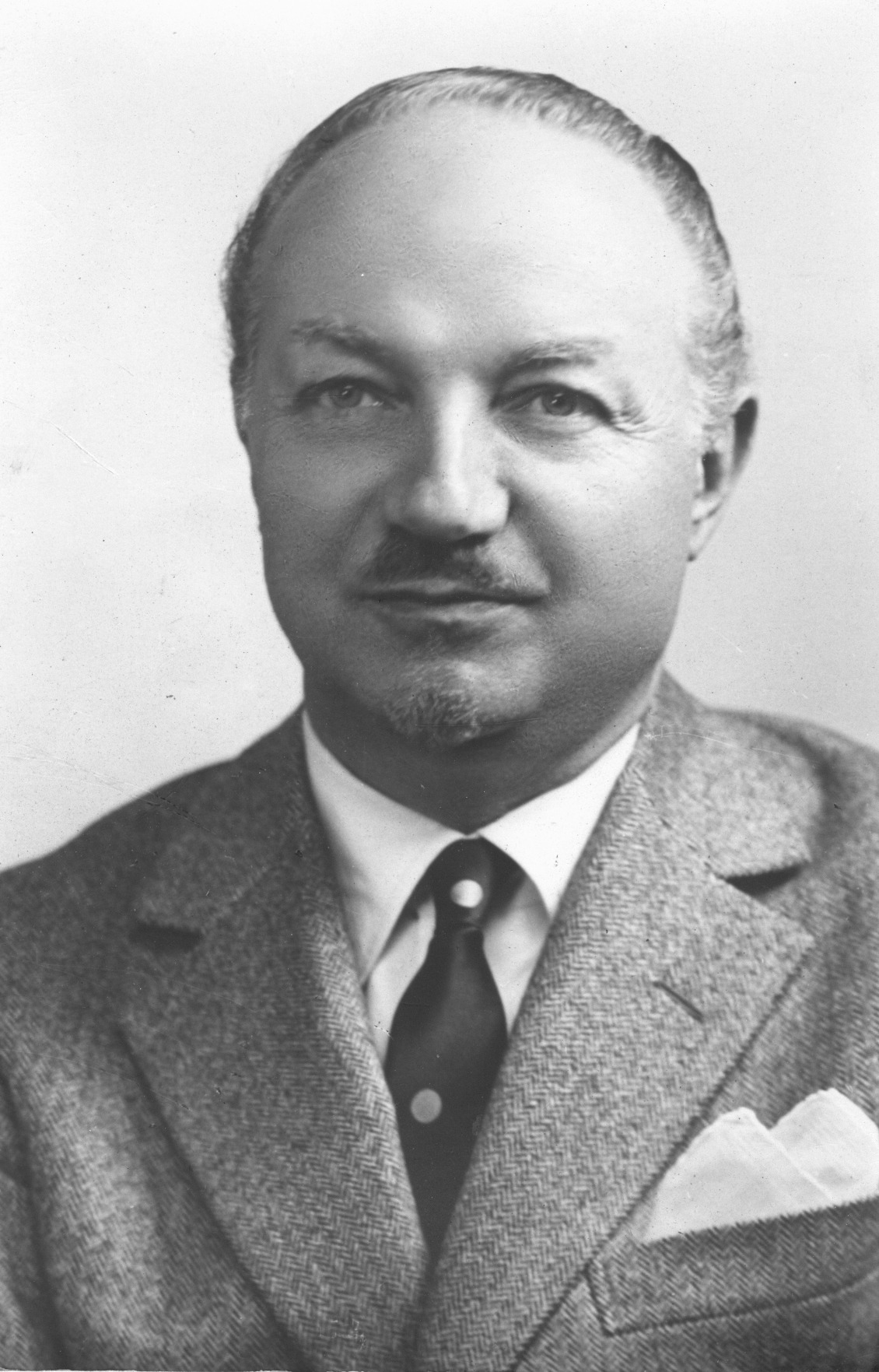
- Born: 21 July 1906; Milan, Italy
- Died: 27 February 1993 (aged 86); Milan, Italy
- Education: Politecnico di Milano
- Occupation: Architect
- Buildings: Breda Tower, Milan

Eugenio Soncini (Milan, Italy, 21 July 1906 – 27 February 1993) was an Italian architect.

== Biography ==
=== Education ===
Eugenio Soncini graduated in engineering from the then Regio Istituto Tecnico Superiore (now Politecnico di Milano) in 1929. His career and work may be divided into two distinct phases: before and after the Second World War.

=== The thirties and forties ===
As a recent graduate he was involved in significant collaborations, first with Emilio Lancia and later with Gio Ponti, who at that time collaborated with Lancia. The latter collaboration was so productive that Ponti decided to abandon Lancia and create a new studio with the young Soncini, as a fully-fledged partner: the Ponti-Fornaroli-Soncini Studio. From 1933 to 1947, Soncini worked actively with Ponti on the architectural design and construction of numerous buildings, among the most significant on the Milanese architectural scene at that time, such as the Palazzo Montecatini (1939) and the Clinica Columbus (1938-40). These are the years of his practical and professional growth and maturing, which prompted him towards his own design and creative autonomy.

In 1940 he married Mariele Sessa and had three children.

=== The fifties and sixties ===
An exuberant and strong-willed personality, towards the end of the war, Soncini began to find the partnership with Ponti restrictive. So, when in 1947 his brother Ermenegildo graduated in architecture, he took the opportunity to leave Ponti and open an independent studio, the Studio Eugenio and Ermenegildo Soncini in the Palazzina Sessa in via Ariosto 1 in Milano. After World War II, he followed his own interests, concentrating on the office and hospital building sectors. His architectural production mainly concerned the Milanese area, with a significant amount of office buildings, clinics and educational institutions. Among the most significant ones were the Torre Breda (originally known as Grattacielo di Milano), the La Madonnina and Capitanio Clinics, the office buildings of Michelin, Galbani and Milano Assicurazioni, the Torre Tirrena and the Palazzo La Serenissima/Campari. Besides working with his brother Ermenegildo, he collaborated with Luigi Mattioni, Pier Luigi Nervi and Giuseppe Pestalozza.

Due to this long activity, he was described as an "exponent of Rationalism, in a version that was first classicist and then rigorously technological." The professional activity of Soncini and his studio concluded in 1973.

He died in 1993.

Its archive was donated by the heirs to CASVA (Centro Alti Studi sulle Arti Visive, Milan) in 2017, in order to preserve it and make it freely available to the public.

== Works ==
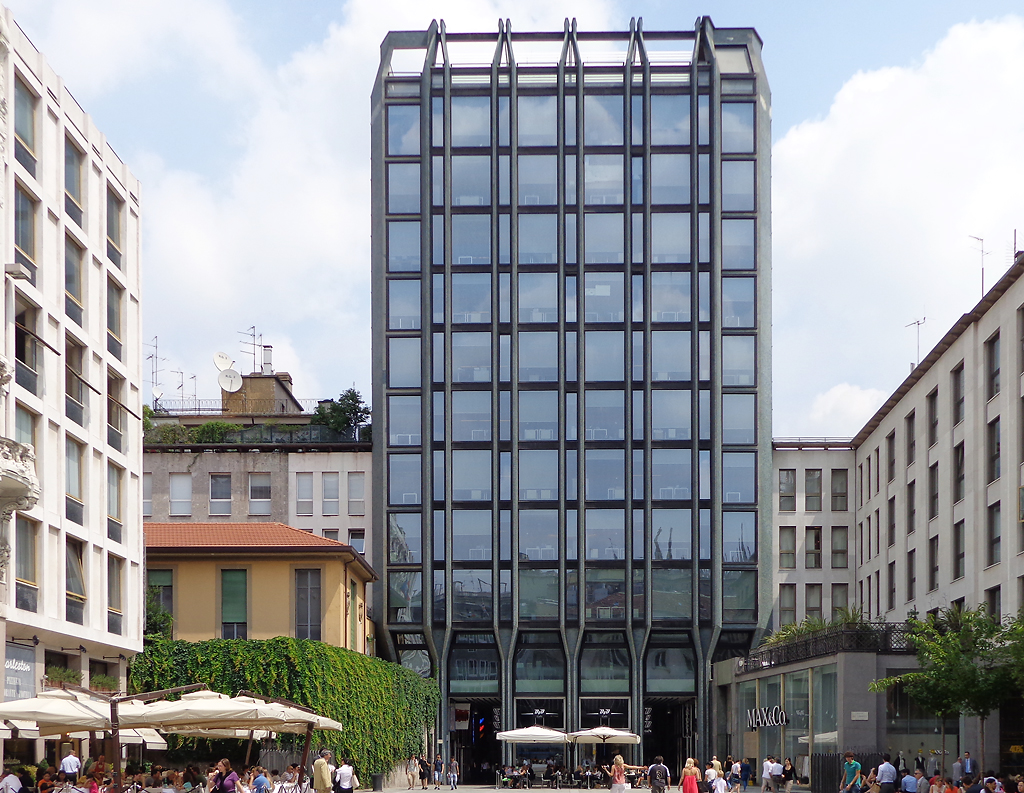
The Torre Tirrena in Piazza Liberty, Milan

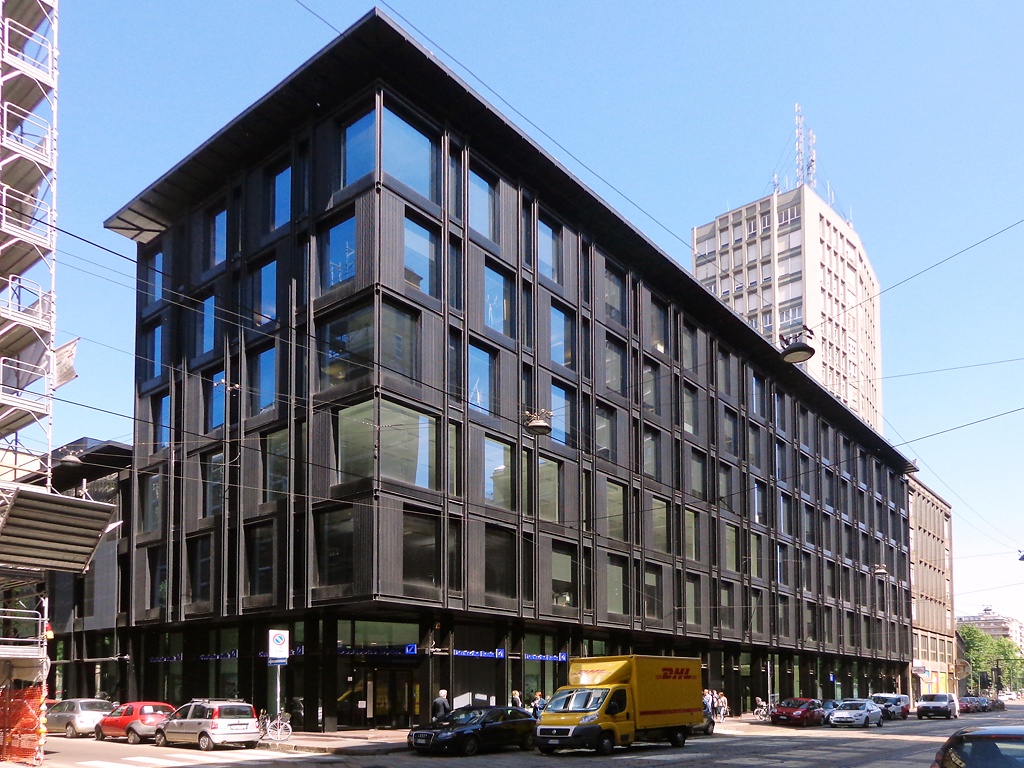
Palazzo La Serenissima in via Turati, Milan

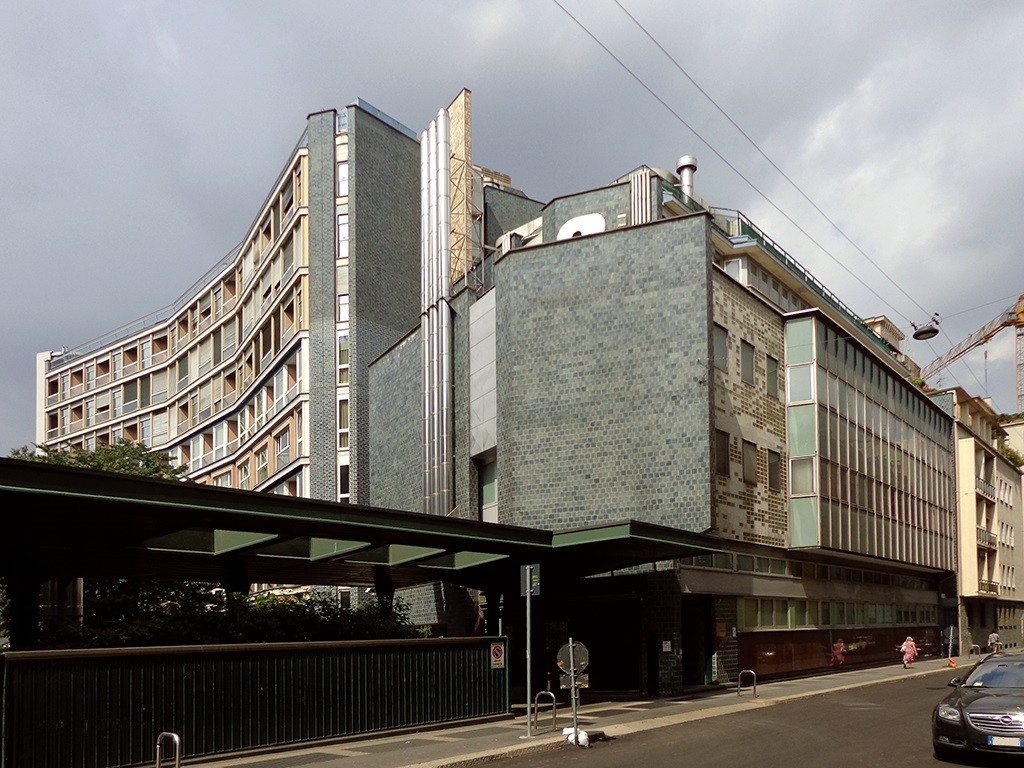
La Madonnina Clinic, in via Quadronno, Milan

(as partner in Studio Ponti-Fornaroli-Soncini)

1935 Albergo Paradiso del Cevedale, in Val Martello, Merano

1935 Casa Buffa, viale Regina Margherita 42, Milan

1935 Casa, via Ceradini 12, Milan

1935 Casa Sissa, corso Italia 9, Milano

1935 Ville De Bartolomei, Bratto, Val Presolana

1940 Palazzo per uffici Ledoga, via C. Tenca 32, Milano

1935 Case Signorili, via G. Modena, via Cicognare, via De Togni, Milan

1935 Primo Palazzo Montecatini, via Moscova, Milan

1936 Casa Laporte, via Brin 12, Milan

1937 Domus Alba, via Goldoni 63, Milan

1936 Progetto per Villa Marzotto, in Valdagno, Vicenza

1939 Partecipation in the project competion for the Ministero degli Affari Esteri, Roma

1939 Palazzo Donini, in piazza S. Babila, Milan

1939 Palazzo Ferrania (now FIAT), at the corner of corso Matteotti and via San Pietro all'Orto, Milan

1939 Palazzo Eiar (now RAI), corso Sempione 27, Milan

1938 Il Liviano, Padua University, Padua

1939 Casa d'Italia, in Fürstenberg Palace, Wien

1939 Project for Palazzo Marzotto, Milan

1940 Casa, in via Appiani 19, Milan

1940 Palazzina Salvatelli, piazza delle Muse, Rome

1940 Project for Palazzo INA, via Manin, Milan

1940 Clinica Columbus, via Buonarroti 48, Milan

1943 Project for Stabilimento Mondadori, Rho (Milan)

1944 Palazzo Garzanti, via della Spiga 28, Milano (as Studi Tecnici di Architettura Riuniti: Gio Ponti, Pier Giulio Bosisio, Gigi Gho', Eugenio Soncini)

1945 Palazzo e Albergo delle Ferrovie Nord, Milan

(as partner in Studio Eugenio ed Ermenegildo Soncini)

1949 Hotel du Lac, on Lake Lugano, Porto Ceresio

1946/47 Palazzo Michelin, corso Sempione 66, Milan

1946/48 Palazzo del Marchese Casati Stampa di Soncino, via Torino, Milan

1946/48 Palazzo Trevie, via De Amicis 28, at the corner of via Cesare Correnti and via Camminadella, Milan

1948 Residential complex in San Juan, Argentina

1949/50 Casa di cura Capitanio, via Mercalli 28-30, Milan

1949-53 Office building and cinema Eliseo, via Torino 64, Milano

1950/51 Sede della Società Condor, Rho (Milan)

1950/51 Raffineria di petrolio e prodotti chimici (for CONDOR), Pantenedo di Rho (Milan)

1950/54 Complesso EDICEMI, via Turati 3, Milano

1950/54 Palazzo S.K.F, via Turati 4, Milan

1951/64 Palazzo IRBS, via Meravigli 12-14, via Camperio 3-5, via Giulini 9, Milan

1952 Study for the expansion of the Arena Civica, Milan

1952/54 Grattacielo di Milano (now known as Torre Breda), piazza della Repubblica, Milan (in collaboration with L. Mattioni)

1952/54 Casa del giovane lavoratore, viale Fulvio Testi 285, Milano

1953 Villa Tremolada, Longone al Segrino

1953/55 Sport field, via del Filagno 2, Lomazzo

1953/55 Palazzi Riunione Adriatica di Sicurtà (RAS), via Turati 3, Milan

1957/58 Municipality building and primary scools, Rovello Porro

1954/55 Ospedale di Circolo di Saronno, piazza Borella 1, Saronno

1954 Padiglione Breda, Sesto S. Giovanni

1954/55 Palazzetto, in via Unione, Milan

1954/55 Opera Sociale Femminile, via Ippocrate 22, Milan

1954/57 Torre Tirrena, piazza Liberty 4, Milan

1955/56 Hotel Ambrosiano e Opera della Cardinal Ferrari, via S. Sofia 9, Milan

1956/59 Palazzo Galbani, via F. Filzi 25, Milano (in collaboration with G. Pestalozza e L. Nervi)

1957/59 Casa di cura Madonnina, via Quadronno 29/31, Milan

1957/60 Project for Torre Dalmine (unbuilt), via Pola, viale Restelli, via Rossellini, Milano

1957/65 Sede della Compagnia di Assicurazioni di Milano, via del Lauro 5/7, Milan

1958 Hotel del Centro, via Broletto 16, Milan

1958/60 Chiesa, Chak Chumbra, Pakistan

1958/60 Chiesa, Caquetà, Columbia

1958/65 Ente Opere Sociali Don Bosco, Sesto S. Giovanni (Milan)

1959 Project of Fabbrica di aeroplani Breda (unbuilt), Argentina

1959 Scuole convitto Istituto di Assistenza per Minorenni, for Ente Comunale Assistenza (ECA), Milan

1960/62 Casa di abitazione con negozi ed uffici, viale Gian Galeazzo 25, Milan

1960/63 Gruppi di fabbricati, via Chiusa and via Disciplini (for I.R.B.S.), Milan

1960/64 Mixed-use office and retail building, at the corner between via Gioia and via Cardano, Milan

1960/64 Clinica De Luca, Castelnuovo Daunia (Foggia)

1961/62 Palazzina Crosti, via Buonarroti 41, Milan

1956/64 Palazzo per l'Istituto Romano Beni Stabili (I.R.B.S.), via Meravigli, Milan

1961/63 Office building I.R.B.S., via Bordoni, Milan

1961/63 Sede della Società Malinverno, via Custodi, Milan

1962/81 Istituto S. Ambrogio, via Melchiorre Gioia, Milan

1963 Residential complexes, via De Amicis, via Torino, via C. Correnti, via Camminadella, Milan

1963/64 Office building Società Cagisa, piazza IV Novembre, Milan

1963/65 Row houses, via Correggio, Milan

1963/65 Casa di Cura Sant'Anna, Imperia

1965 Private clinica, Istanbul

1965 Residential building, via Roentgen, Milan

1965/70 Row houses, viale Bligny, via Gian Galeazzo Visconti, via S. Croce, via Morosini, via Spartaco, Milan

1966/68 Palazzo La Serenissima, via Turati 25/27, Milan

1968/72 Due Palazzi ad uffici for Lloyd International, corso Europa 15 and Corsia dei Servi, Milan

1968/73 Aerhotel Executive, at Porta Garibaldi Railway Station, Milan

1970 Residential and office building, corso Vercelli, Milan

1970/71 Seat of La Pace Insurance Company, piazza Cavour, Milan

1970/71 Hotel Principe & Savoia Residence, piazza della Repubblica, Milan

1970/72 Opera Pro Giovani Operai (Maria Belloni), viale Fulvio Testi 285, Milan

1970/72 Hotel Principe e Savoia, piazza della Repubblica 13, Milan

== Bibliography ==
Overall work

M. Ornella, Eugenio ed Ermenegildo Soncini - Architetture esatte, Silvana Editoriale, Milano, 2026

Francesca Rosa, Soncini Eugenio, ad vocem, Allgemeines Künstler - Lexicon, De Gruyter Saur, München, CV, 2019, 24

F. Irace, Soncini Eugenio, Soncini Ermenegildo, in C. Olmo (ed.), Dizionario dell'Architettura del XX sec., vol. VII, pp. 183-184, Istituto della Enciclopedia Italiana, Torino, 2000

A. Kordalis, N. Tommasi, Eugenio ed Ermenegildo Soncini tra sperimentalismo e rigore tecnologico negli anni della Ricostruzione, master thesis (supervisor L. Crespi) , Facoltà di Architettura, Politecnico di Milano, 1996

P. Portoghesi (ed.), Dizionario Enciclopedico dell'Architettura e Urbanistica, Istituto Ed. Romano, Roma, 1969

Albergo (hotel) in Val Martello, Alto Adige, 1935

P. Masera, Un albergo di montagna esemplare, in "Edilizia Moderna", n. 27-28, 1938

First Palazzo Montecatini, in Via Moscova, Milan, 1935

G. Ponti, (a cura di), Il Palazzo per uffici Montecatini, Milan 1938

AA.VV., Il palazzo per uffici Montecatini inaugurato a Milano il 28 ottobre XVI. Montecatini società generale per l'industria mineraria e chimica, Tipografia Pizzi e Pizio, Milan 1938

P. Masera, La nuova sede della Montecatini in Milano, in "Edilizia Moderna", Jan.-June, 1939

G. Pagano, Alcune note sul palazzo della Montecatini, in "Casabella Continuità", n. 138-139-140, 1939

G. Ponti, Un palazzo del lavoro, in "Domus", n. 135, pagg. 36-47, 1939,

G. Ponti, Superfici, in "Stile", n. 2, 1941

G. Ponti, Genesi di un perfezionamento, in "Stile", n. 25, pagg. 16-19, 1941

G. Ponti, I materiali dello stile di domani, in "Domus", n. 229, 1948

G. Ponti, L'alluminio e l'architettura, in "Domus", n. 230, 1948

G. Ponti, Alcune considerazioni sugli edifici per uffici, in "Edilizia Moderna", n. 49, pagg. 11-19, 1952

P. Bottoni, Antologia di edifici moderni in Milano: guida, Editoriale Domus, Milan 1954

G. Ponti, Ingegneria e architettura, in "Domus", n. 313, 1955

P. Bottoni, Milano oggi, Edizioni Milano Moderna, Milan 1957

Bruno Zevi, Spazî dell'architettura moderna, tav. 332, Einaudi, Turin 1973

O. Selvafolta (a cura di), Costruire in Lombardia: 1880-1980, industria e terziario, Electa, Milan 1986

Donatella Paterlini, Ponti e Milano. Dalle prime opere alle facciate in ceramica, Domus 708, "Itinerario n. 49", n. 13, 1989

L. Cappellini e G. Ricci, Guide di Architettura: Milano, Milan 1990

L. L. Ponti, Gio Ponti: l'opera, Leonardo Editore, Milan 1990

G. Arditi e C. Serrato, Giò Ponti: venti cristalli di architettura, Il Cardo, Venice 1994

Fabio Ramella e Gio Ponti, Il Palazzo della Montecatini, Alinea, Florence

Stefania Mornati, L'edificio della Montecatini: un solitario palazzo delle meraviglie, L'industria delle costruzioni 402, pp. 109-111, July-Aug. 2008

Casa Laporte, in Via Brin, Milan, 1936

G. Ponti, Una villa a tre appartamenti in Milano, in "Domus", n. 111, 1937

G. Arditi - C. Serrato, Giò Ponti: venti cristalli di architettura, Il Cardo, Venice 1994

Palazzo Ferrania (ora FIAT), in Corso Matteotti, Milan 1939

A.C.R., Palazzo "Fiat" per uffici in Milano, in "Edilizia Moderna", n. 30, 1939

Palazzo Donini, in Piazza San Babila, Milan 1939

Giunta Prov. Amm. di Milano, Memoria illustrativa delle tre successive convenzioni dirette alla ricostruzione del lato orientale di Piazza San Babila, Milan 1940

Clinica Columbus, in Via Buonarroti, Milan 1940

G. Ponti, La Clinica Columbus, in "Domus", n. 240, pag. 12, 1949

P. Bottoni, Milano oggi, Edizioni Milano Moderna, Milan 1957

G. Arditi e C. Serrato, Giò Ponti: venti cristalli di architettura, Il Cardo, Venice 1994

Palazzina Salvatelli, in Piazza delle Muse, Rome

G. Ponti, Una palazzina a Roma in Piazzale delle Muse, in "Architettura", July 1941

Palazzo per uffici e magazzini di vendita Michelin, in Corso Sempione, Milan 1946/47

red., La nuova sede della Michelin di Milano, in "Vitrum", n. 4-5, pag. 17, 1950

C. Bassi - F. Berlanda e G. Boschetti, Scala in un Palazzo per uffici, in "Documenti di Architettura, Composizione e Tecnica Moderna", pag. 837, 1954

P. Bottoni, Antologia di edifici moderni in Milano: guida, Editoriale Domus, Milan 1954

C. Pagani, Architettura italiana oggi, pag. 176-178, Hoepli, Milan 1955

J. Peter, Alluminium in modern architecture, Reynolds Metals Co., Louisville 1956

Palazzo della S.K.F., in Via Turati, Milano, 1948/50

red., Nuove sede della società SKF, in "Vitrum", n. 59, pag. 9, 1954

C. Villa, Rivestimento a lastre di pietra: edificio per uffici in Milano, in "Documenti di Architettura, Composizione e Tecnica Moderna", pagg. 911-913, 1958

Capitanio Clinic, in Via Mercalli, Milan 1949/50

B.F. Moretti, Ospedali, Hoepli, Milan, 1951

red., Clinique Santa Capitanio, Milano, in "L'Architecture d'Aujourd'Hui, pagg. 26-27, 1953

P. Nestler, Neues Bauen in Italien, Callwey Ed., Munich, 1954

P. Bottoni, Antologia di edifici moderni in Milano: guida, Editoriale Domus, Milan 1954

C. Pagani, Architettura italiana oggi, pagg. 190-194, Hoepli, Milan 1955

P. Bottoni, Milano oggi, Edizioni Milano Moderna, Milan 1957

A. Kordalis, Clinica Capitanio, in Sapienza tecnica e Architettura, Milano-Pavia 1950-1980, (a cura di A. Bugatti e L. Crespi), Alinea Editore, Milan, 1997

Grattacielo di Milano (now Breda Tower), in Piazza della Repubblica, Milan, 1952/54

C. Bassi - F. Berlanda e G. Boschetti, Nuclei di scale nel Grattacielo di Milano, in "Documenti di Architettura, Composizione e Tecnica Moderna", pagg. 794-5, 1954

L. Mattioni, Il grattacielo di Milano, in "Edilizia Moderna", n. 56, pagg. 9-30, 1955

L. Mattioni, L'inedito grattacielo di Milano, Tipografia R. Scotti, Milan 1956

P. Bottoni, Milano oggi, Edizioni Milano Moderna, Milan 1957

P. Peters, Wohnhochhäuser, Callwey Ed., Munich 1959

R. Aloi, Nuove architetture a Milano, Hoepli, Milan 1959

G. Alfonsi e G. Zucconi, Luigi Mattioni. Architetto della ricostruzione, Electa, Milan 1985

F. Ogliari, Una cittá tra le nuvole: Milano di sopra, Silvana Editoriale, Milan 1986

E. Triunveri, Grattacielo di Milano, in Sapienza tecnica e Architettura, Milano-Pavia 1950-1980, (a cura di A. Bugatti e L. Crespi), Alinea Editore, Milan 1997

Opera Sociale Femminile, in Via Ippocrate, Milan 1954/55

R. Aloi, Nuove architetture a Milano, pagg.113-116, Hoepli, Milan 1959

Nuova Sede Galbani, in Via F. Filzi, Milan 1954/55

R. Aloi, Nuove architetture a Milano, pagg. 223-228, Hoepli, Milan,1959

R. Pedio, La nuova sede della societá Galbani, in "L'Architettura", n. 75, pagg. 593-601, 1962

P. L. Nervi, Nuove strutture, Ed. Comunità, Milan 1963

red., Sede della societá Galbani a Milano, in "Vitrum", n. 135, 1963

Ospedale di Circolo di Saronno, Varese 1954/55

E. Paoli, L'ospedale Circolo a Saronno (Varese), in "Gli edifici ospedalieri", in "Vitrum", n. 3, 1954

E. Paoli, L'ospedale Circolo a Saronno (Varese), in "Gli ingressi", in "Vitrum", n. 6, s. d.

Albergo Ambrosiano e Opera della Cardinal Ferrari, in Via S. Sofia, Milan, 1955/56

red., Fabbricato per Hotel e scuola, in "Vitrum", n. 101, pagg. 42-47, 1958

R. Aloi, Nuove architetture a Milano, Hoepli, Milan 1959

Torre Tirrena, in Piazza Liberty, Milan 1956/59

C. De Carli, La torre Tirrena a Milano, in "L'Architettura", n. 35, pagg. 308-313, 1958

R. Aloi, Nuove architetture a Milano, Hoepli, Milan 1959

red., Edificio a torre, in "Vitrum", n. 117, pag. 2-7, 1960

Palazzo per l'Istituto Romano Beni Stabili (I.R.B.S.), in Via Meravigli, Milan 1956/64

C. Conti, Palazzo per uffici e abitazioni, in "Edilizia Moderna", n. 67, pagg. 105-110, 1959

Clinica La Madonnina, in Via Quadronno, Milan 1957/59

Relazione descrittiva della Casa di Cura La Madonnina in Via Quadronno a Milano, Sept. 1961

R. Pedio, Casa di cura La Madonnina, in "L'Architettura cronache e storia", n. 9, pagg. 582-591, 1962

Sede della Milano Assicurazioni, in Via del Lauro, Milan 1958/65

M. Guerci, Tipologia delle strutture, Tamburini, Milan 1961

E.Guicciardi - U. Balzani, La nuova casa della " Milano", Milan 1963

red., Parsol verde nella vecchia Milano, in "Trasparenze", n. 1, 1970

Fabbrica di aeroplani, in Argentina, 1959

R. G. Angeli, Fabbrica di aeroplani in Sudamerica, in "Documenti di Architettura, Composizione e Tecnica Moderna", pagg. 5-12, 1949

Palazzo per uffici ‘La Serenissima’, in Via Turati angolo Cavalieri, Milan 1966/68

E. & E. Soncini, Relazione tecnica sull’edificio della Serenissima, Milan, 14 Aprile 1969

red., La Serenissima a Milano, in "Trasparenze", n. 3, 1970

Opera Pro Giovani Operai (Maria Belloni), in Viale Fulvio Testi, Milan 1970/72

red., Casa del Giovane Lavoratore, in "Vitrum", n. 65, pag. 6, 1955

Aerhotel, stazione di Porta Garibaldi, Milan 1970/73

red., Aerhotel Executive a Milano, in "Trasparenze", n. 15-16, 1973

Albergo (hotel) sul lago di Varese, Varese, s.d.

C. Pagani, Architettura italiana oggi, pag. 208-209, Hoepli, Milan 195

== See also ==
- Rationalism (architecture)
- Modern architecture
