= A2A Tower =

- Torre A2A (Italian)
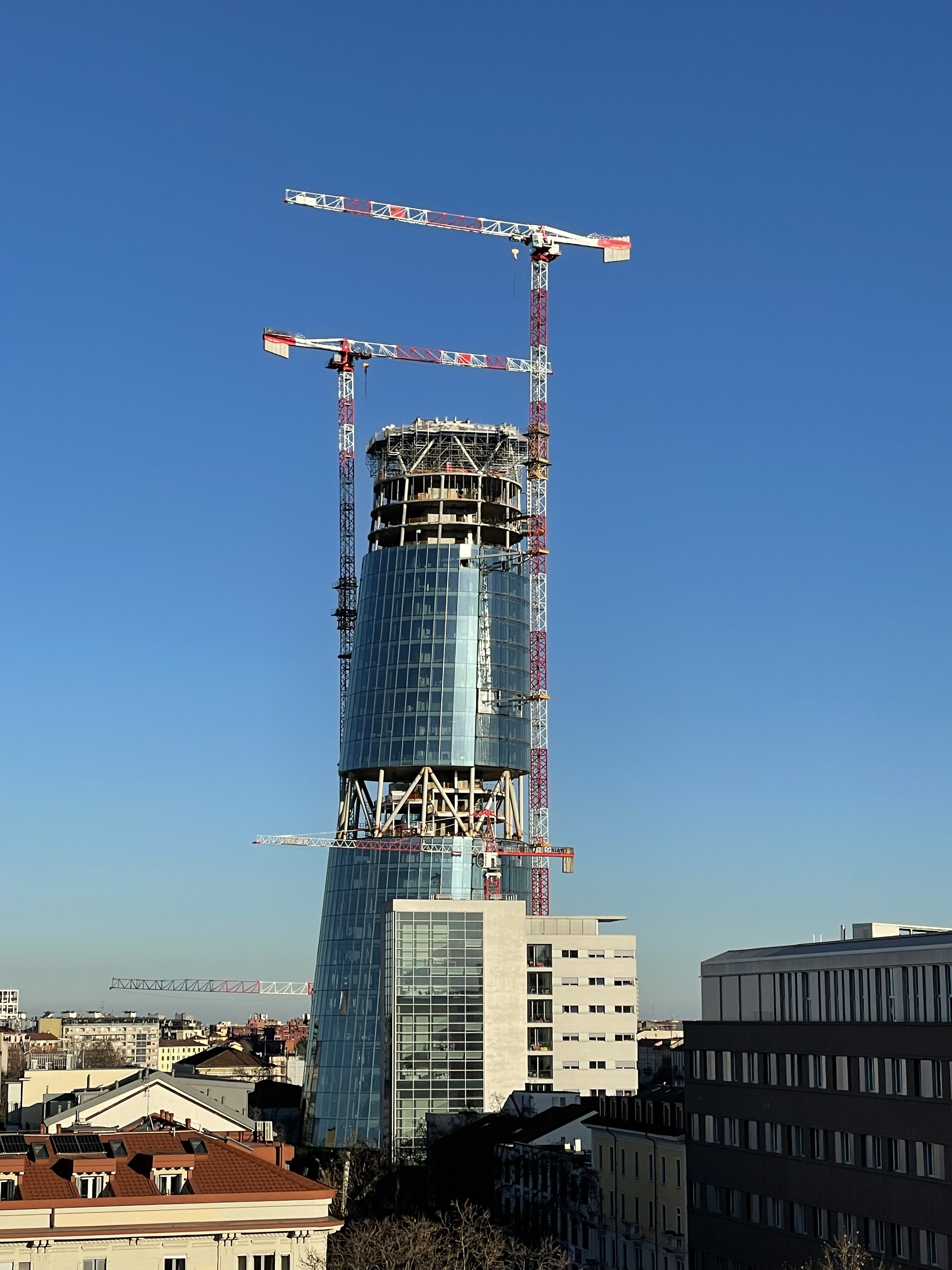
- A2A Tower in March 2026
- Interactive map of the A2A Tower area
- Alternative names: Faro Tower

General information
- Type: Commercial
- Location: Milan, Italy
- Coordinates: 45.4462°N 9.2023°E
- Construction started: 2024

Height
- Height: 144 metres

The A2A Tower (Italian: Torre A2A) is a skyscraper in Milan, Italy, which is currently under construction. Designed by architects Antonio Citterio and Patricia Viel, the tower will stand at a height of 144 metres.

== History ==
The tower is being built as part of the redevelopment project for the historic Porta Romana railway yard in Milan and is set to house the new headquarters of A2A. Approved by Milan's Municipality 5, the project also includes the revitalization of Piazza Trento, aligning with broader efforts to reconnect and transform the Porta Romana area. The site will also host the Milan Olympic Village for the 2026 Winter Olympics.

The tower topped out on 19 March 2026.
