= CityWave =

Skyscraper in Milan, Italy

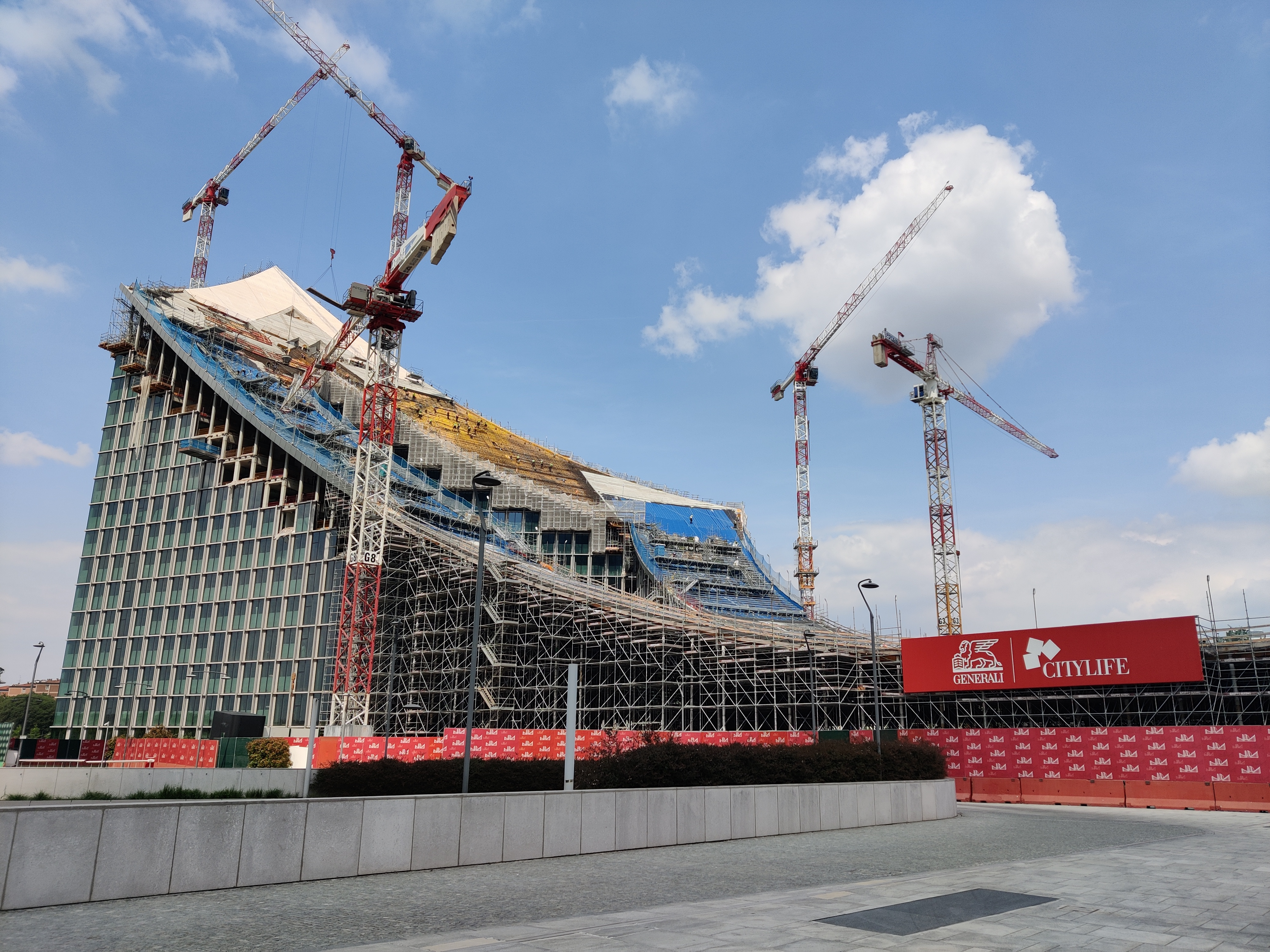
- Construction works in April 2026
- Interactive map of the CityWave area

General information
- Type: Commercial
- Location: Milan, Italy
- Coordinates: 45.4794°N 9.158°E
- Construction started: 2021
- Opening: 2026

Height
- Height: 110 metres

Design and construction
- Architecture firm: Bjarke Ingels Group

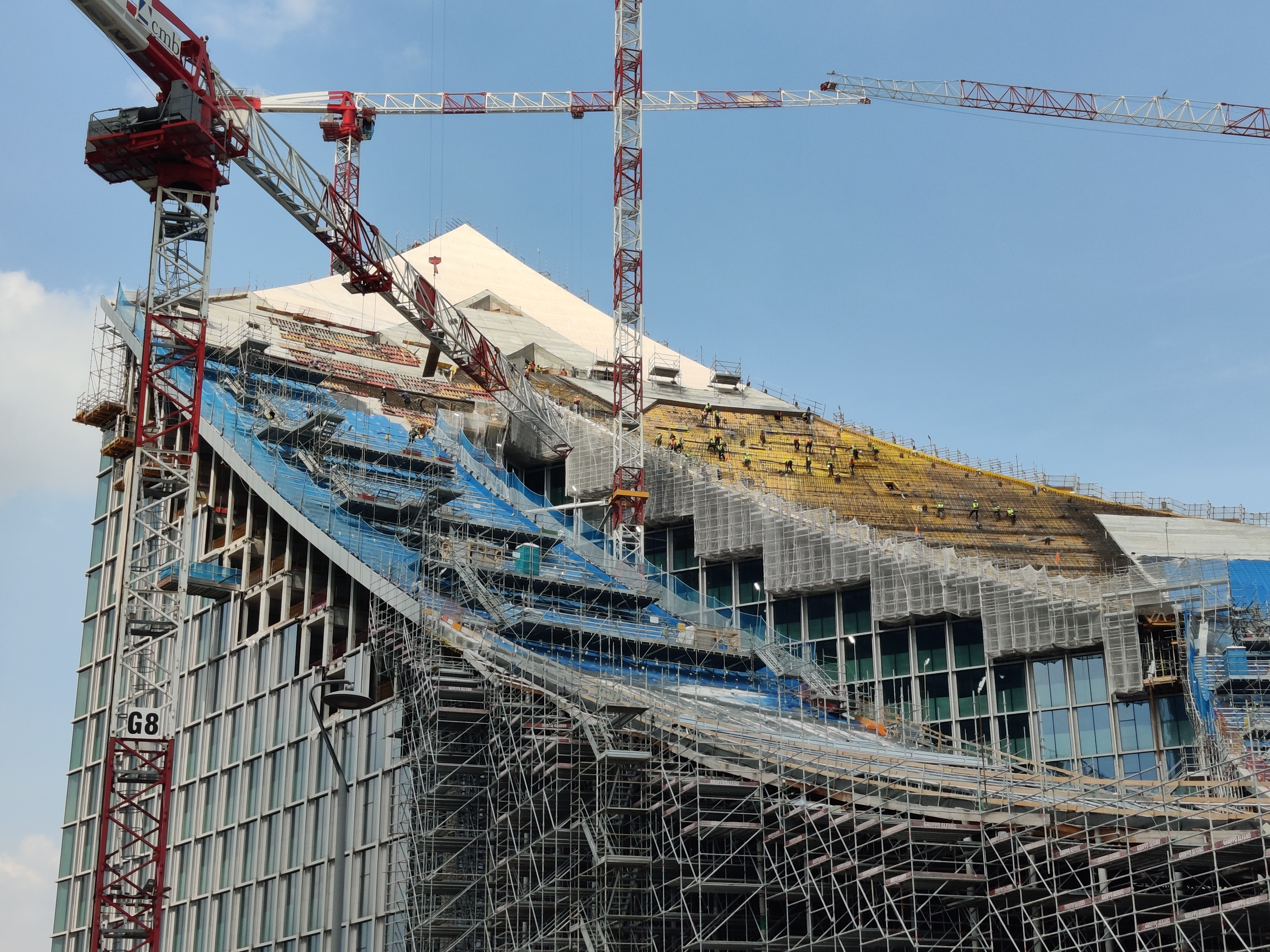

CityWave is a skyscraper in Milan, Italy, which is currently under construction. Designed by Bjarke Ingels Group, the building will stand at a height of 110 metres.

== History ==
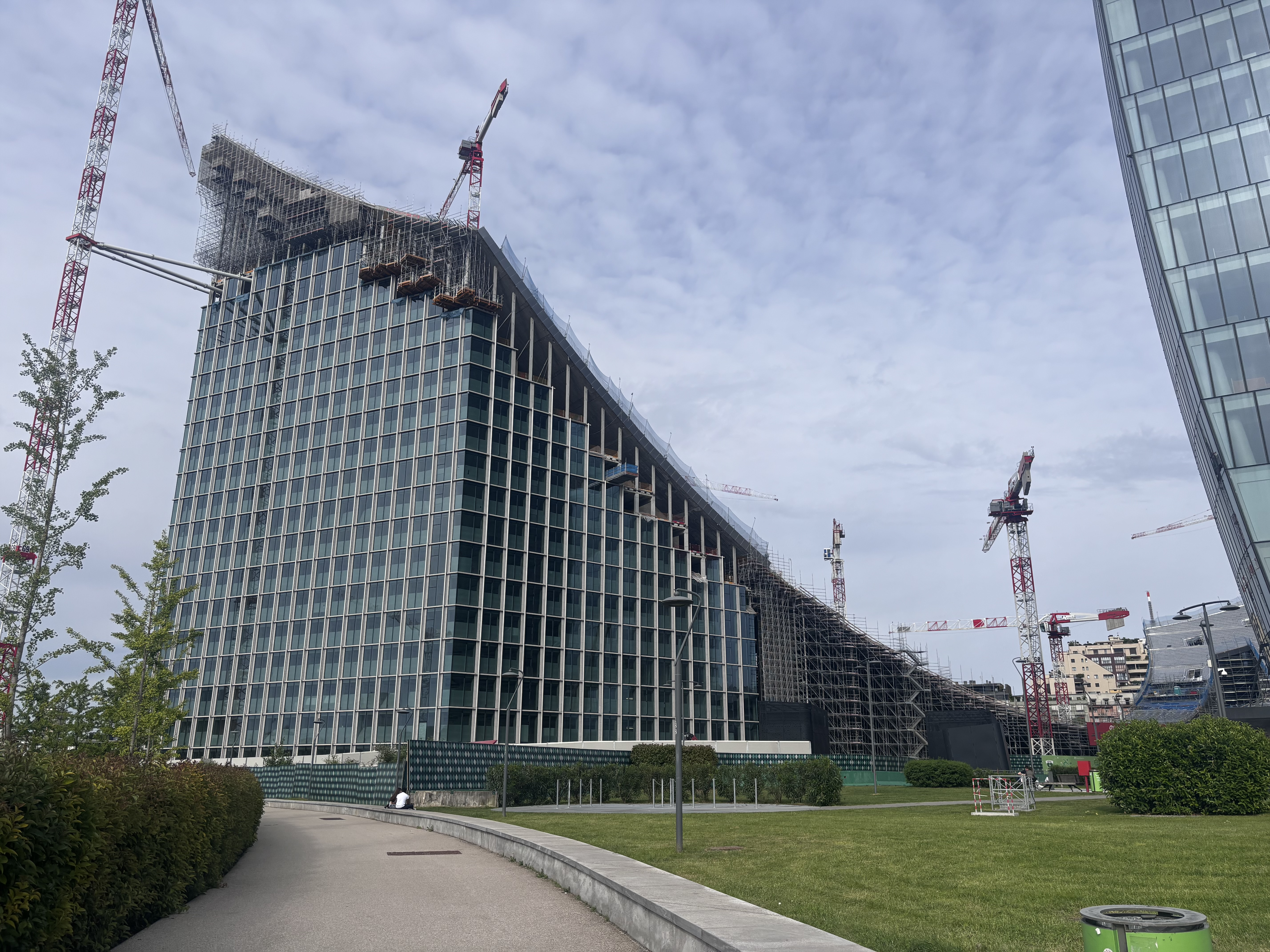
Citywave under construction in May 2026

The construction of the building, designed by the Danish architecture firm Bjarke Ingels Group, began in September 2021 with the laying of the foundation stone, attended by the Mayor of Milan, Giuseppe Sala. The completion of the works is scheduled for 2026.

== Description ==
Located in the CityLife business district, the building consists of two structures, one 110 meters tall and the other 50 meters tall, connected by a curved portico. The roof will host the largest photovoltaic park in Milan.
