= Telecom Italia Tower (Naples) =

- Torre Telecom Italia
- Telecom Italia Tower

General information
- Type: Office
- Location: Centro Direzionale isola F5, Naples, Italy
- Coordinates: 40.8582°N 14.2797°E
- Construction started: 1988
- Completed: 1994
- Owner: Telecom Italia

Height
- Roof: 129 m (423 ft)

Technical details
- Floor count: 33
- Lifts/elevators: 8

Telecom Italia Tower (Italian: Torre Telecom Italia) is a 129-metre (423 ft) office skyscraper in the business district of Naples, Italy. It is currently the ninth-tallest skyscraper in Italy. It was, for 15 years, the tallest building in Italy.

== Description ==
The complex consists of a central tower and two low high-rises surrounding it. It is covered in mirrored glass on all sides.

The front has two pylons lined with white panels that comprise the body of the elevators and stairs. By the middle is placed a panoramic balcony that looks like a black horizontal cut on the front, but often do not notice because it is a little higher up the roof of the body low. This feature is also present in two other places in the tower back up, almost at the top, occupying almost the whole plan, and always back to the same position on the façade of the overview, or the middle of the skyscraper.

Watching the sides of the tower, you notice another peculiarity of the structure, or the indentations in glass and different levels of the roof in these sides. It is visible from the surrounding hills and from different parts of town, port and the Napoli Centrale railway station.

== See also ==
- Telecom Italia
- List of tallest buildings in Naples
- Centro direzionale di Napoli
