= List of tallest structures in Italy =

This is a list of the tallest structures in Italy. This list contains all types of structures.

Photo	Structure	Place	Structural type	Year of built	Height (m)	Height (ft)	Geographical coordinates	Notes
	Chimney of Tavazzano Power Station	Tavazzano	Chimney	1955	253	830	45°20′3.28″N 09°26′1.56″E	
	Chimney Porto Tolle Power Station	Porto Tolle	Chimney	1977	250	820	44°57′23.48″N 12°29′22.56″E	
	Chimney of Torrevaldaliga Power Station	Civitavecchia	Chimney		250	820	42°07′34.83″N 11°45′27.23″E	
	Sulcis Power Station Chimney	Portoscuso	Chimney	1966	250	820	39°11′43.24″N 08°24′00.18″E	
	Chimney Bivio Montegelli	Bivio Montegelli	Chimney		240	790	44°00′05″N 12°12′42″E	
	Messina Strait Powerline Crossing, Sicilian Tower	Bocca del Canalone	Lattice tower	1957	232	761	38°15′57.31″N 15°39′03.33″E	since 1994 not in use as electricity pylon any more
	Messina Strait Powerline Crossing, Calabrian Tower	Reggio di Calabria	Lattice tower	1957	232	761	38°14′42.19″N 15°40′58.82″E	since 1994 not in use as electricity pylon any more
	Chimney of Eugenio Montale Power Station	La Spezia	Chimney		220	720	44°06′43.93″N 09°52′31.02″E	
	Chimney of Sermide Power Plant	Sermide	Chimney		220	720	45°01′35.9″N 11°15′09.81″E	
	Masts of Radio San Paolo	Rome	Guyed Mast	1917	217.6	714	41°51′17″N 12°28′37″E	3 guyed masts, made of wood, demolished
	Chimney E312	Taranto	Chimney		212	696	40°30′35.9″N 17°13′15.68″E	Chimney of power station of Ilva works
	San Filippo del Mela Power Station Main Chimney	San Filippo del Mela	Chimney		210	690	38°12′15.24″N 15°17′11.05″E	
	ILVA-Works, Large Chimney	Taranto	Chimney		209	686	40°30′0.82″N 17°12′21.82″E	
	Cassano d'Adda Power Station Chimney	Cassano d'Adda	Chimney		207	679	45°30′44.02″N 9°30′38.29″E	known as "la ciminiera grande blu"
	Marcianise transmitter	Marcianise	Guyed mast		205	673	41°00′07.18″N 14°19′0.24″E	mediumwave broadcasting mast (frequency: 657 kHz)
	Florence-Terrarossa transmitter	Terra Rossa	Guyed mast	2004	204	669	43°48′53.66″N 11°16′23.63″E	mediumwave broadcasting mast (frequency: 657 kHz)
	LORAN-C transmitter Sellia Marina	Sella Marina	Guyed mast	1959	200	660	38°52′21″N 16°43′06″E	
	Chimneys of Rossano Power Station	Rossano	Chimney	1977	200	660	39°37′20.61″N 16°36′26.1″E + 39°37′21.68″N 16°36′21.93″E	
	Licata Chimney	Licata	Chimney		200	660	37°08′17″N 13°50′37″E	
	Chimney of Federico II Power Station	Brindisi	Chimney		200	660	40°33′49.29″N 18°01′56.12″E	
	Caorso Chimney	Caorso	Chimney		200	660	45°04′21″N 09°52′14″E	
	Chimney of Unit 4 of Ostiglia Power Plant	Ostiglia	Chimney		200	660	45°03′36.13″N 11°08′12.98″E	
	Chimney of Fiume Santo Coal-Fired Power Station	Porto Torres	Chimney	1992	200	660	40°50′47.22″N 08°18′25.85″E	
	Chimneys of Vado Ligure Power Station	Vado Ligure	Chimney		200	660	44°16′29.28″N 08°25′51.11″E; 44°16′31.47″N 08°25′54.12″E	
	Chimney of Alessandro Volta Power Station	Montalto di Castro	Chimney		200	660	42°21′21.55″N 11°32′10.66″E	
	Chimneys of Piacenza Enelpower Power Station	Piacenza	Chimney		200	660		demolished in July 2003 and October 2003 with a special excavator,
	Chimneys of Piombino Enel Power Station (Torre del Sale)	Piombino	Chimney	1977-1988	197	646,325	42.956888°N 10.603217°E	Demolished on October 29, 2024 at 10:09 am with 88 kg of explosives at the base,

== See also ==
- List of tallest buildings in Italy

== Sources ==
- Enav, Ente Nazionale Assistenza al Volo - Italian ATC
