= Thetris =

Skyscraper in Milan, Italy

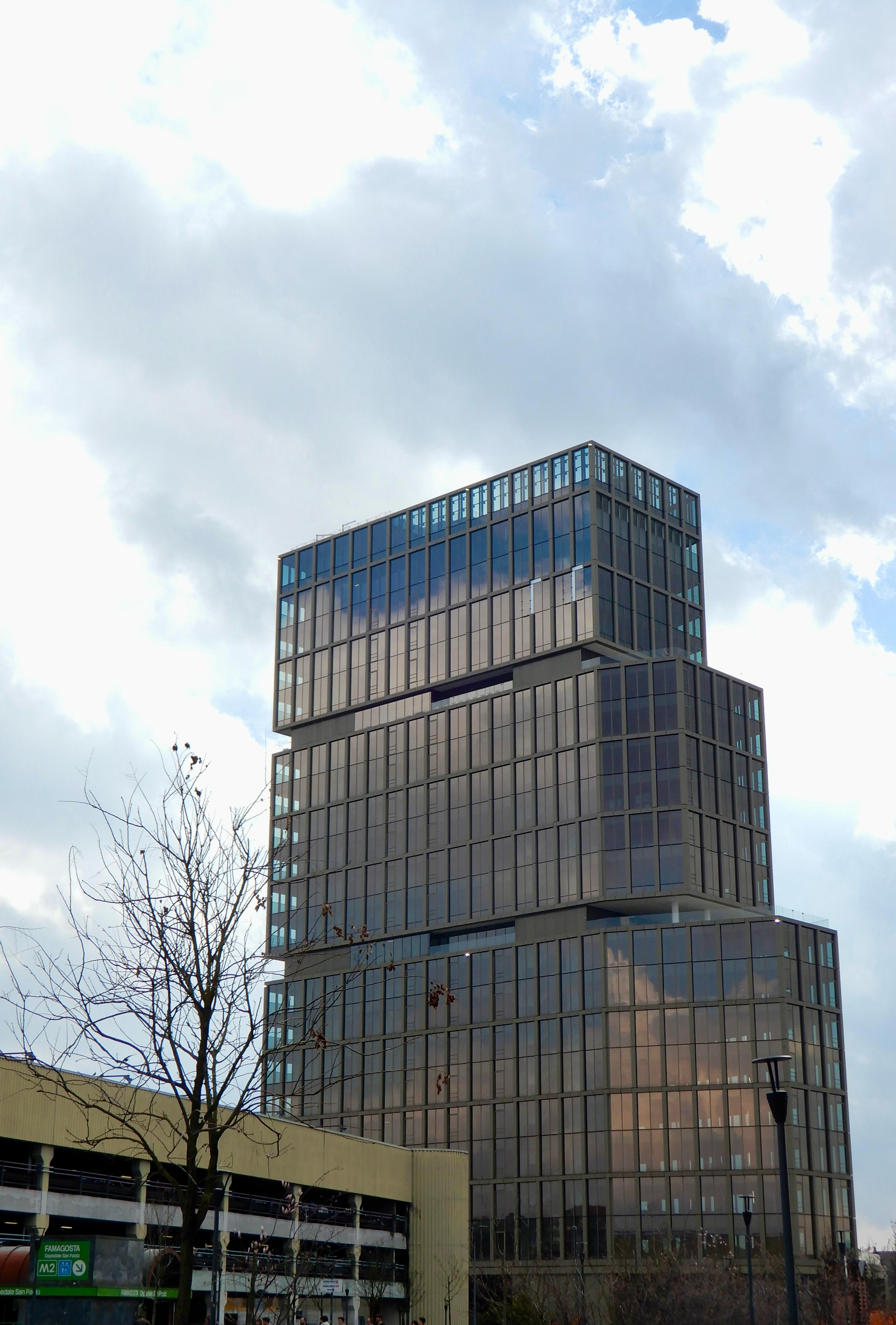
- Construction work in March 2025
- Interactive map of the Thetris area

General information
- Location: Milan, Italy
- Coordinates: 45.4351°N 9.1686°E
- Construction started: 2021
- Opening: 2025

Height
- Height: 100 m (328 ft)

Thetris is a skyscraper in Milan, Italy, which is currently under construction.

== History ==
Designed by the architecture firm Be.st led by Stefano Belingardi, the skyscraper replaces the project developed by PRP Architettura, known as Skydrop, whose construction was halted in 2022 after work began in 2021.

== Description ==
The tower is expected to reach a height of 100 m (328 ft) with 20 to 25 floors. The new building's facade will consist of three sections of 8, 6, and 4 floors.
