= List of tallest buildings in Naples =

Naples is the third biggest city in Italy and 10th-most populous urban area in the European Union and 2nd in Italy. The Metropolitan City counts more than 3 millions inhabitants and is the third in Italy. Naples has 10 buildings above 100 m (328 ft) and around 15 buildings between 70 m (230 ft) and 100 m (328 ft), a total of about 25 above 70 m (230 ft). As for the number of buildings above 100 m (328 ft), Naples has a 7th place in the European Union. Most skyscrapers are office buildings.

== Tallest buildings ==
Was the tallest building in Naples upon completion

The list includes buildings (above 70 m (230 ft)) in the city of Naples and its metropolitan area.

| Rank | Name | Image | Height m (ft) | Floors | Year | Use |
|---|---|---|---|---|---|---|
| 1 | Telecom Italia | | 129 m (423 ft) | 33 | 1994 | Office |
| 2= | Torre ENEL 1 | | 123 m (404 ft) | 36 | 1994 | Office |
| 2= | Torre ENEL 2 | | 123 m (404 ft) | 33 | 1994 | Office |
| 4= | Torre Francesco | | 118 m (387 ft) | 36 | 1994 | Office |
| 4= | Torre Saverio | | 118 m (387 ft) | 36 | 1994 | Office |
| 6 | Consilio Regionale Campania | | 115 m (377 ft) | 28 | 1994 | Office |
| 7= | New Law Courts Tower A | | 110 m (361 ft) | 30 | 1994 | Office |
| 7= | New Law Courts Tower B | | 110 m (361 ft) | 30 | 1994 | Office |
| 9 | Cattolica Assicurazioni | | 105 m (344 ft) | 30 | 1958 | Office |
| 10 | Ambassador's Palace Hotel | | 101 m (331 ft) | 30 | | Hotel |
| 11 | Edificio Eni-Italgas | | 88 m (289 ft) | 24 | 1994 | Office |
| 12 | Giunta Regione Campania | | 88 m (289 ft) | 24 | 1994 | Office |
| 13 | Holiday Inn Hotel | | 82.5 m (271 ft) | 26 | 1994 | Hotel |
| 14 | Direzione Ff.Ss. | | 82 m (269 ft) | 18 | 1965 | |
| 15 | Edificio E3 | | 75 m (246 ft) | 22 | 1994 | Office |
| 16 | Torre Nuovo Policlinco | | 74 m (243 ft) | 21 | 1964 | Office |
| 17= | Banco di Napoli West Tower | | 70 m (230 ft) | 20 | | Office |
| 17= | Banco di Napoli East Tower | | 70 m (230 ft) | 20 | | Office |
| 17= | Torre Centro Direzionale de Napoli I | | 70 m (230 ft) | 20 | | Office |
| 17= | Torre Centro Direzionale de Napoli II | | 70 m (230 ft) | 20 | | Office |
| 17= | Twin Towers On Green Axis I | | 70 m (230 ft) | | | |
| 17= | Twin Towers On Green Axis II | | 70 m (230 ft) | | | |

== See also ==
- List of tallest buildings in Italy
