= Pirelli Tower =

- Grattacielo Pirelli (Italian)
- East elevation from Piazza Duca d'Aosta, 2016

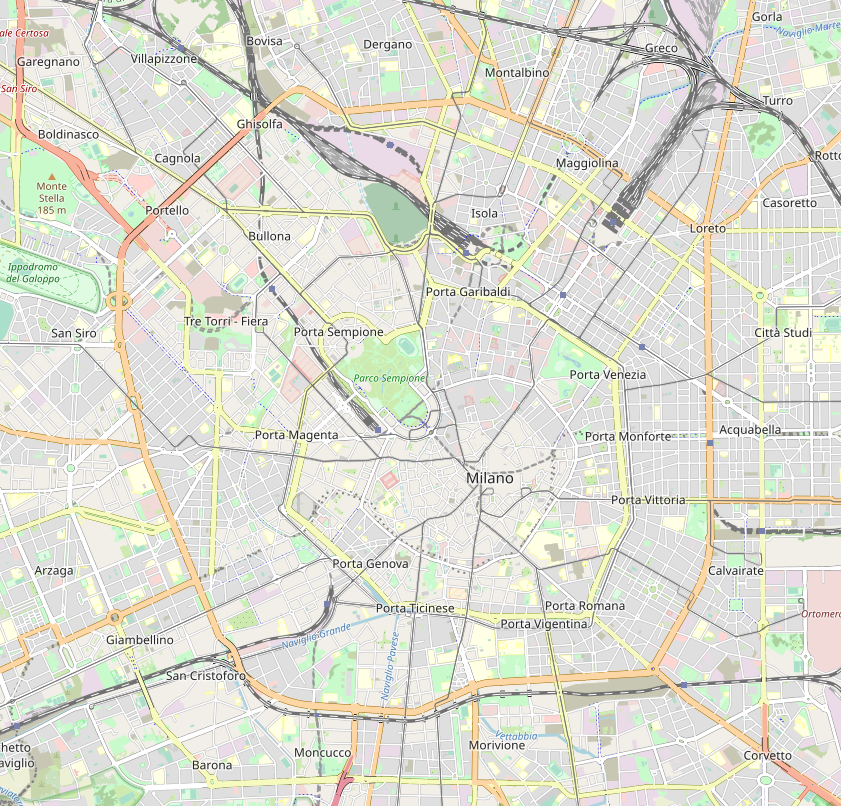
- Location within Milan
- Alternative names: Pirellone

General information
- Status: Completed
- Type: Commercial offices
- Architectural style: Modernism
- Location: Via Fabio Filzi, 22; Milan, Lombardy, Italy
- Coordinates: 45°29′05″N 9°12′05″E
- Construction started: 1956
- Completed: 1958
- Owner: Regional Government of Lombardy

Height
- Antenna spire: 127 m (417 ft)
- Roof: 124 m (407 ft)
- Top floor: 113 m (371 ft)

Technical details
- Floor count: 32; 2 below ground
- Floor area: 24,000 square metres (260,000 sq ft)
- Lifts/elevators: 6

Design and construction
- Architects: Giò Ponti; Pier Luigi Nervi
- Main contractor: Pirelli & C. SpA

Pirelli Tower (Italian: Grattacielo Pirelli – also nicknamed Pirellone, literally 'Big Pirelli') is a 32-storey, 127 m (417 ft) skyscraper in Milan, Italy. The base of the building is 1,900 m^{2} (20,000 sq ft), with a length of 75.5 m (248 ft) and a width of 20.5 m (67 ft). The construction used approximately 30,000 m^{3} (1,100,000 cu ft) of concrete. The building weighs close to 70,000 t (69,000 long tons; 77,000 short tons) with a volume of 125,324 m^{3} (4,425,800 cu ft).

Characterized by a structural skeleton, curtain wall façades and tapered sides, it was among the first skyscrapers to abandon the customary block form. After its completion it was the tallest building in Italy until 1961, when the restoration of the Mole Antonelliana's pinnacle was done. The architectural historian Hasan-Uddin Khan praised it as "one of the most elegant tall buildings in the world" and as one of the "few tall European buildings [that made] statements that added to the vocabulary of the skyscraper".

The building inspired the Pan Am Building (now MetLife Building) in New York, the National Mutual West Plaza in Auckland and the Banco Sabadell Tower in Barcelona.

== History ==
In 1950, Alberto Pirelli, president and owner of the giant Pirelli tyre company, ordered that a skyscraper be built in the area where the corporation's first factory was located in the 19th century. The project was developed by architect Gio Ponti, with the assistance of Pier Luigi Nervi and Arturo Danusso.

Construction of the tower began in 1956, when Italy was experiencing an economic boom. The tower was to be surrounded by low-lying buildings on a pentagonal plot of land. Upon its completion in 1958, it became a symbol not only of Milan, but also of the economic recovery of Italy after the devastation of World War II. At 127 m (417 ft), it was the tallest building in Italy after Mole Antonelliana until 1995. The company sold the building to the Lombardy regional government in 1978.

== Incidents ==
=== 2002 plane crash ===
On the afternoon of 18 April 2002, a Rockwell Commander 112 single-engine airplane registered in Switzerland hit the building. The aircraft was apparently scheduled to fly from Locarno to Milan. The plane was low on fuel and Linate Airport was preparing an emergency landing prior to the crash, but the pilot suddenly strayed and crashed into the building. The pilot and two people inside the tower were killed in the accident. Two goals of the restoration work were to maintain the structural and artistic integrity of the building and to upgrade its status as an executive headquarters by introducing new support services and technological systems.

== See also ==
- Architecture of Italy
- List of tallest buildings in Italy
