= List of tallest buildings in Genoa =

Genoa is the sixth biggest city in Italy. The city and its metropolitan area have four skyscrapers above 100 m (328 ft) and more than 20 skyscrapers between 70 m (230 ft) and 100 m (328 ft). The oldest skyscrapers are the Torre Piacentini, which was built in the years 1938–1940, and Dante 2 built in 1939.

== Cityscape ==
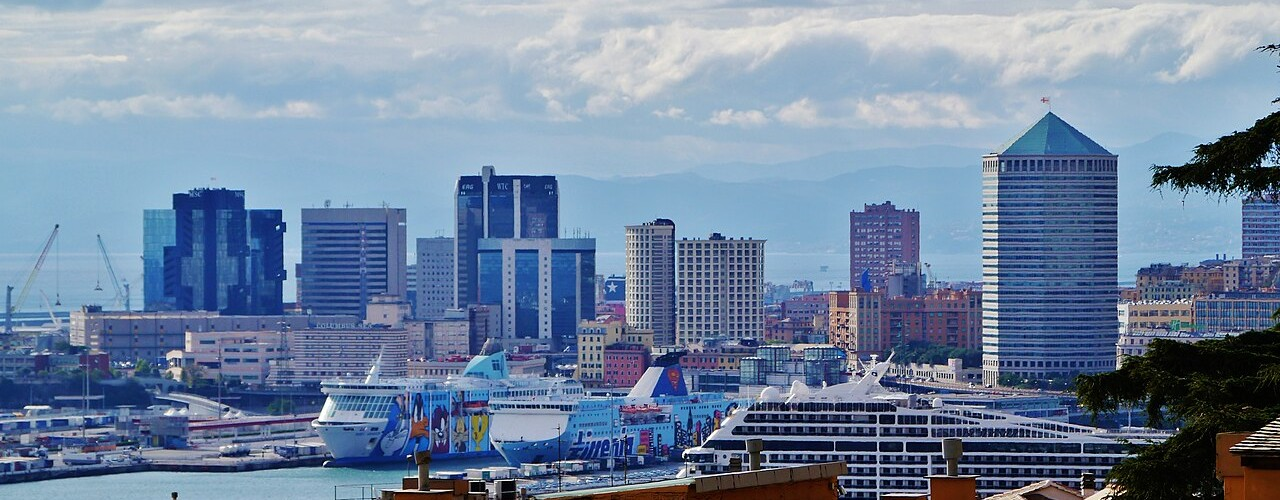
Skyline of Genoa in 2020

== Map of tallest buildings ==
This map displays the location of buildings taller than 90 m (295 ft) in Genoa. Each marker is coloured by the decade of the building's completion.

Buildings taller than 100 m (328 ft) in Milan. An asterisk (*) next to the name of the building indicates it is located outside the map.
- 1950s and before
- 1960s
- 1970s
- 1980s
- 1990s
- 2000s
- 2010s
- 2020s
1 Matitone
2 Piacentini Tower
3 San Vincenzo Tower
4 World Trade Center Genoa
5 MSC Tower
6 Torre Cantore
7 Torre Sampierdarena 1
8 Corte Lambruschini

== Tallest buildings ==
Was the tallest building and lighthouse in Genoa upon completion

The list includes buildings around 70 m (230 ft) and above in the city of Genoa and its metropolitan area.

Rank	Name	Image	Height m (ft)	Floors	Year	Use
1	Matitone		109 m (358 ft)	26	1992	Office
2	Piacentini Tower		108 m (354 ft)	31	1940	Office
3	San Vincenzo Tower		105 m (344 ft)	23	1967	Office
4	World Trade Center Genoa		102 m (335 ft)	25	1992	Office
5	MSC Tower		100 m (328 ft)	23	2014	Office
6	Torre Cantore		92 m (302 ft)	21	1970	Office
7	Torre Sampierdarena		90 m (295 ft)	22	1970	Residential
8=	Corte Lambruschini 1		87 m (285 ft)	20	1990	Office
8=	Corte Lambruschini 2		87 m (285 ft)	20	1990	Office
10=	Torre Cap (Shipping Tower)		85 m (279 ft)		1993	Office
10=	Torre Sole		85 m (279 ft)	19		Residential
10=	Torre Mare		85 m (279 ft)	19		Residential
10=	Torre Luna		85 m (279 ft)	19		Residential
14	Dante 2 Tower		83 m (272 ft)	24	1939	mixed use
15=	Torre Francia		80 m (262 ft)		1993	Office
15=	Torre Finmeccanica		80 m (262 ft)	16	2004	Office
15=	La Torre Pegli 1		80 m (262 ft)	20	1981	Residential
18	Torre Pegli A		78 m (256 ft)	20	1970	Residential
19	Lighthouse of Genoa		77 m (253 ft)	N/A	1538	Lighthouse
20=	Starhotel President		75 m (246 ft)	19		Hotel
20=	Torre Sampierdarena 2		75 m (246 ft)	18	1970	Residential
20=	I Gemelli		75 m (246 ft)	18	1993	mixed use
23=	Comparto 1		70 m (230 ft)			
23=	Torre ELAH		70 m (230 ft)	20	2007	mixed use
23=	Torre Pegli B		70 m (230 ft)	18	1970	Office
23=	Torre Pegli C		70 m (230 ft)	18	1970	Office
23=	Torre Corso Europa		70 m (230 ft)	18	1980	Residential
23=	Torre Quartoalto		70 m (230 ft)	16	1989	Residential
29	Comparto 1		70 m (230 ft)		1993	Office

== Tallest under construction or proposed ==
Name	Height m (ft)	Floors	Status	Use
Leonardo 1	160 m (525 ft)		cancelled	
Leonardo 2	160 m (525 ft)		cancelled	
Leonardo 3	160 m (525 ft)		cancelled	
Leonardo 4	160 m (525 ft)		cancelled	
Leonardo 5	160 m (525 ft)		cancelled	
Leonardo 6	160 m (525 ft)		cancelled	
Torri degli Erzelli	140 m (459 ft)	40	cancelled	
Leonardo 7	110 m (361 ft)		cancelled	
Leonardo 8	110 m (361 ft)		cancelled	
Leonardo 9	110 m (361 ft)		cancelled	
Leonardo 10	110 m (361 ft)		cancelled	
Leonardo 11	110 m (361 ft)		cancelled	
Leonardo 12	110 m (361 ft)		cancelled	
Torri Erzelli	80 m (262 ft)	21	Proposed	
Torre Gadolla	80 m (262 ft)	20	cancelled	Office

== See also ==
- List of tallest buildings in Italy
