= Dante 2 Tower =

Skyscraper in Genoa, Italy

- Torre Dante 2
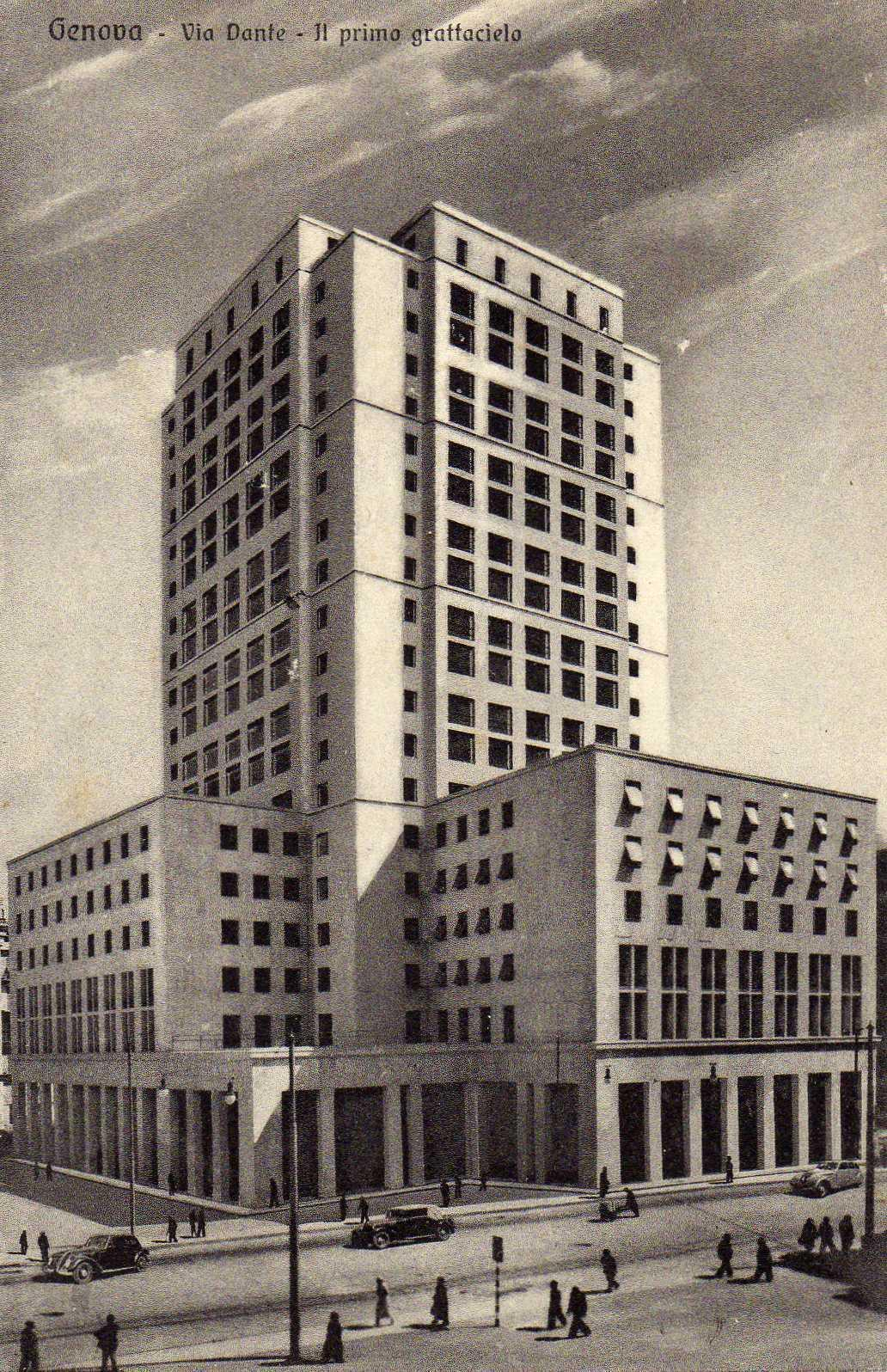
- Vintage view
- Interactive map of the Dante 2 Tower area

General information
- Location: Genoa, Italy
- Coordinates: 44°24′20.03″N 8°56′10.98″E

Height
- Roof: 83 m (272 ft)

The Dante 2 Tower (Italian: Torre Dante 2) is a building located in Genoa, Italy.

== History ==
Construction of the building, designed by architect Giuseppe Rosso, began in 1936 and were completed in 1939, with works carried out by the construction company Gazzani e Lavarello. Construction took place within the framework of the broader urban redevelopment project that led to the creation of Piazza Dante, as was also the case for its twin, the Piacentini Tower.

== Description ==
The tower has a height of 83 meters and 24 floors. The structure of the building, which is clad in San Gottardo stone at the base and travertine on the rest of the façade, is made of reinforced concrete. It consists of a seven-story volume with a portico at the base that functions as a podium, above which rises a tower with a "U"-shaped plan. The building's architecture showcases a futurist influence, evident in the vertical thrust of the suspended walkways that characterize the northern façade.

== Gallery ==
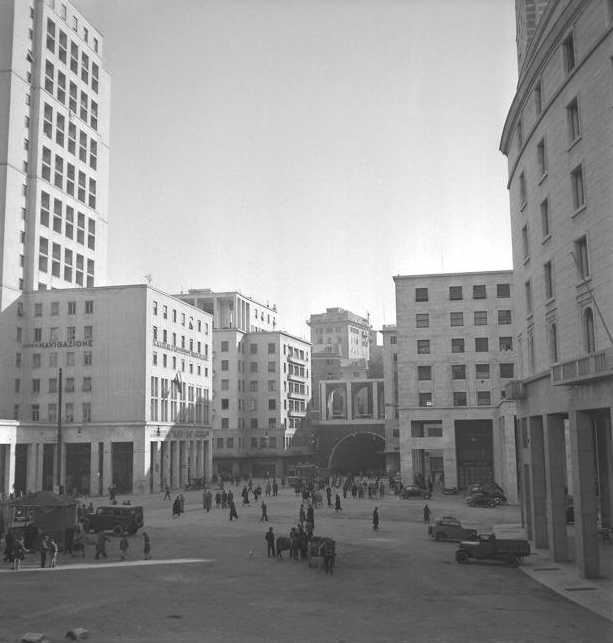

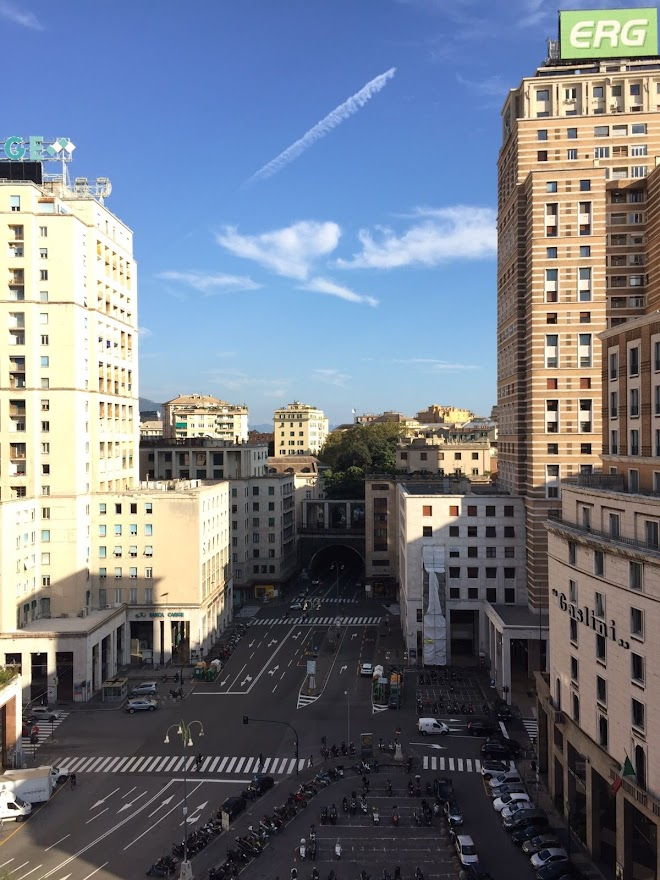

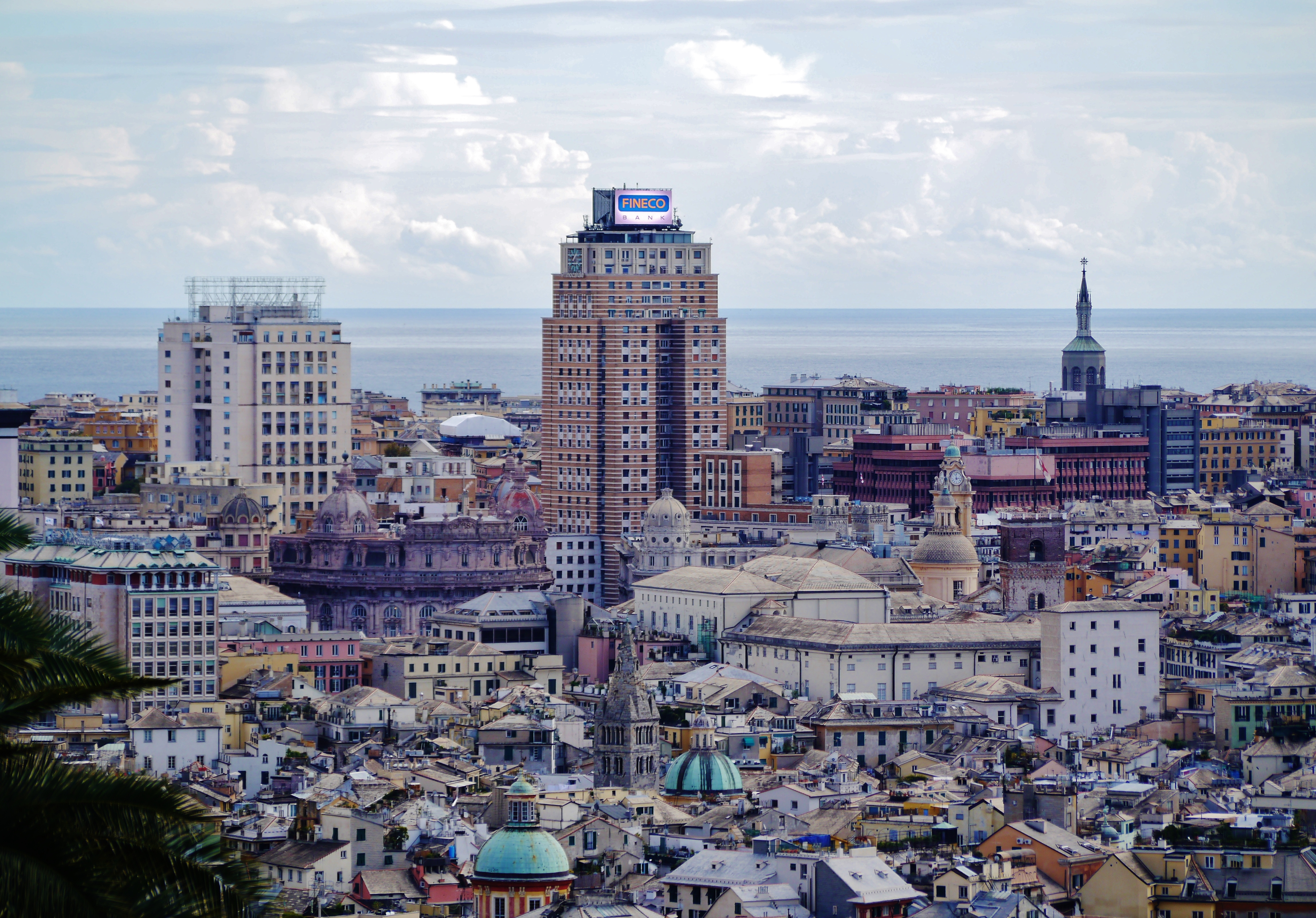
