= Margaret Wentworth Owings =

American environmentalist and founder

Margaret Wentworth Owings (29 April 1913 – 21 January 1999) was an American environmentalist, whose notable contributions to the movement include founding and serving as the first president of the Friends of the Sea Otter. Owings earned numerous awards for her inspiring work in conservation, including the National Audubon Society Medal in 1983, the United Nations' Environment Program's Gold Medal Award and the U.S. Department of the Interior's Conservation Service Award. Margaret Owings was named by the Audubon Society as one of 100 individuals who had done the most to shape the environmental movement, in a list that also included Jacques-Yves Cousteau and Lady Bird Johnson.

Born April 29, 1913, in Berkeley, California, Margaret Wentworth Owings graduated from Mills College in 1934 and completed graduate studies in art at Harvard University in 1935. Her first marriage was to Malcolm Stuart Millard, with whom she had a daughter, Wendy. She and Malcolm lived in Deerfield, Illinois before moving to Carmel, California in the early 1940s.

Her second marriage was to Nathaniel Alexander Owings, a founding partner of the architectural firm of Skidmore, Owings & Merrill. Margaret and Nathaniel wrote the Big Sur Land Use Plan, and were key players in the fight to prevent the development of Big Sur, California.

From 1963 to 1969 she was the sole woman serving on the California State Park Commission. She led numerous environmental groups including Defenders of Wildlife, the National Park Foundation, African Wildlife Leadership Foundation and the Environmental Defense Fund. She was also a founder of the Rachel Carson Council.

Owings died in 1999, just after her book "Voices from the Sea" was published.

== Works ==
- Margaret Wentworth Owings (1998). Voice from the sea: and other reflections on wildlife & wilderness. Monterey Bay Aquarium Press. ISBN 9781878244239.
