= Louis Skidmore =

American architect (1897–1962)

- Born: April 8, 1897; Lawrenceburg, Indiana, U.S.
- Died: September 27, 1962 (aged 65); Winter Haven, Florida, U.S.
- Occupation: Architect
- Awards: AIA Gold Medal (1957)
- Practice: Skidmore, Owings & Merrill

Louis Skidmore (April 8, 1897 – September 27, 1962) was an American architect, co-founder of the architecture firm Skidmore, Owings & Merrill and recipient of the AIA Gold Medal.

== Biography ==
Louis Skidmore was born in Lawrenceburg, Indiana. He served in the United States Army during World War I as a Sergeant. On June 14, 1930, he married Eloise Owings, the sister of Nathaniel A. Owings his future business partner. Louis and Eloise were married for over 32 years until his death in 1962. They had two sons Louis Jr. and Philip Murray.

=== Bradley Polytechnic Institute ===
Louis Skidmore studied at Bradley Polytechnic Institute, now known as Bradley University in Peoria, Illinois, finishing in 1917.

=== Boston ===
Louis Skidmore trained with Cram and Ferguson, a large, established firm in Boston that designed Gothic style buildings. At night he studied at the Boston Architectural Club creating additional design problems that were critiqued by Harvard and MIT professors. Winning a prize at the BAC opened the door for Skidmore to attend MIT. He subsequently studied at Massachusetts Institute of Technology until 1924.

=== Europe ===
After eight years of practicing architecture, Skidmore won the Rotch Traveling Fellowship that allowed him to travel to Europe, where he spent his time primarily in Rome and Paris.
During his time in Paris he met Raymond Hood who convinced him to be involved in the Chicago's World's Fair, as Hood was head of the Board of Design. Also, while in Europe, he met Eloise Owings. They returned to the United States together where Eloise introduced Skidmore to her brother Nathaniel "Nat" Owings.

=== Chicago World's Fair ===
For the 1933 Chicago World's Fair, Skidmore began working with Raymond Hood on the Board of Design, as the design draftsman or junior designer, and also hired Nat Owings. When General Rufus Dawes, head of the Fair, fired all the other architects on the board, Skidmore, being the only one left, became the reviewer for all the designs that were presented by the various companies for the Fair. As a result, Skidmore became acquainted with a lot of commercial companies. After the fair, Skidmore was hired to study the museum in Munich.

=== Skidmore, Owings and Merrill (SOM) ===
Skidmore and Nathaniel A. Owings co-founded the firm in 1936. John O. Merrill became the third partner in 1939. During the war years the firm built a number of large housing projects, most notably the initially secret town of Oak Ridge, Tennessee. In New York a major wartime project was the Abraham Lincoln Houses, a 14-building complex in Harlem (completed in 1948). Another major government-appointed project was the United States Air Force Academy. His firm developed its reputation for reliability in large developments, and became one of the largest and most talked-about skyscraper builders in the 1950s. SOM's most famous building under the original founders was the Lever House, built in 1952.

"Skid was a very easy-going guy, very bright and tricky enough to get work, but a very pleasant guy and if he had a few drinks, he was very cordial. He was never mean. He couldn't have been nicer to me and the four partners who grew up with him. Skid was the man who had the insight in finding people. Skid picked the first four partners." – Gordon Bunshaft

=== Civic involvement ===
Louis Skidmore served as president of the New York Building Congress for 1949 and was vice-president of the Architectural League of New York in 1952. He received the highest individual honor for architecture from the American Institute of Architects, the Gold Medal in 1957.

=== Children ===
Louis Skidmore Jr. retired as an associate partner in Skidmore Owings & Merrill and currently resides in Houston, Tx. Philip M. Skidmore lives and works in Greenwich, Connecticut where he is Chairman of the wealth management firm Belpointe Asset Management.

=== Grandchildren ===
Louis Skidmore's first-born son, Louis Skidmore Jr., fathered three children: Christopher Skidmore, Elizabeth Skidmore and Heather Howard. Philip Skidmore fathered two children: Gregory Skidmore and Anne Skidmore.
