= Nathaniel A. Owings =

American architect (1903–1984)

- Born: February 5, 1903; Indianapolis, Indiana, U.S.
- Died: June 13, 1984 (aged 81); Santa Fe, New Mexico, U.S.
- Occupation: Architect
- Awards: 1983 AIA Gold Medal
- Practice: Skidmore, Owings & Merrill

Nathaniel Alexander Owings (February 5, 1903 – June 13, 1984) was an American architect, a founding partner of Skidmore, Owings & Merrill, which became one of the largest architectural firms in the United States and the world. Owings viewed skyscrapers as his firm's specialty. His reputation rested on his ability to be what he called "the catalyst," the person in his firm who ironed out differences among clients, contractors and planning commissions.

== Early life and education ==
Owings was born on February 5, 1903, in Indianapolis, Indiana. His sister, Eloise, would become the wife of his business partner, Louis Skidmore. In 1920, he traveled through Europe. The experience inspired him to begin to study architecture at the University of Illinois, but was forced to withdraw prematurely because of illness. He continued his education at Cornell University, where he graduated in 1927.

== Career ==
Owings first job as an architect was with the New York firm of York and Sawyer. As a young architect, Owings was impressed with Raymond Hood, who designed the RCA Building in Rockefeller Center. More than 50 years later, Owings described his first glimpse of the 70-story skyscraper as a breathtaking "knife edge, presenting its narrow dimension to Fifth Avenue."

Hood's recommendation led to a job Owings worked as an architect on the Century of Progress Exposition in Chicago (1929–34). He had been hired by his brother-in-law, Louis Skidmore, the chief architect for the exposition. Together they designed the layout and buildings for the entire site. They were told to build pavilions for more than 500 exhibits at minimum cost using lightweight, mass-produced materials; and they devised solutions, using the simplest materials—pavilions built out of beaverboard.

After the exposition was over, the two men worked independently before forming a Chicago-based partnership in 1936 with a small office at 104 South Michigan Avenue. Some smaller projects remain from this period. An architecturally significant residence in Northfield, Illinois, still looks and feels contemporary because of its open, inviting interiors and large windows. The partnership developed projects for corporate clients they had met during the Chicago exposition.

The firm opened a second office at 5 East 57th Street in New York in 1937; and young Gordon Bunshaft was hired by Skidmore. This satellite office focused initially on designing and developing a new office building for the American Radiator Company.

=== Skidmore, Owings and Merrill (SOM) ===
The two architects won the contract to design the 1939–40 New York World's Fair; and in 1939 engineer John O. Merrill joined the firm as partner. The name was changed to Skidmore, Owings & Merrill and the firm's operations were decentralized. Owings's initial responsibilities centered on the Chicago office. Skidmore worked in New York. Owings and Skidmore had learned the hard way that they just couldn't get along together. The partners' dysfunctional relationship could have doomed the firm, but SOM flourished, despite, or maybe because of, simmering distrust.

There were good business reasons for a practice with a foot in both New York and Chicago; and the firm found plenty of work in both cities. At the same time, it was seen as easier for the meticulous Skidmore to bear the aggressive and explosive Owings from a distance. John Merrill, a mild-mannered engineer, figured little in the volatile politics of SOM.

The firm would build a number of large projects, including government-funded work at military installations and air bases. During the war years, the partnership was hired to build a secret town for 75,000 residents in Oak Ridge, Tennessee where the atomic bomb was being developed.

Skidmore and Owings moved easily in the world of the business establishment. Owings became especially adept in encouraging corporate CEOs to award commissions to SOM. The partners didn't develop reputations as clever designers, but rather, they became known for their 'rainmaking' skills and organizational acumen. They relied on others to do the creative work. SOM developed its reputation for reliability in large developments, and became one of the largest and most talked-about skyscraper builders in the 1950s. Owings described the SOM he helped to build as "the King Kong" of architectural firms.

The firm helped to popularize the International style during the postwar period. SOM's best-known early work is Lever House (1952), which was designed by Gordon Bunshaft and reflects the influence of Mies van der Rohe. Bunshaft's many strengths as a designer were enhanced with Owings as his SOM super-salesman; but personal antipathies between these partners produced a complicated relationship.

In 1954, SOM was awarded another major government-appointed project—creating a campus for the United States Air Force Academy near Colorado Springs, Colorado. SOM's concepts were not without detractors in Congress, in the Air Force leadership and elsewhere. As a senior SOM partner, Owings principal role in the project was to mediate differences between members of a Senate appropriations subcommittee and Air Force officers, some of whom had misgivings about what they thought were the firm's unacceptably modern designs.

=== Individual work ===
Frank Lloyd Wright offered faint praise for a SOM project designed by Owings when he identified the J.C. Penney Building on the Circle in Indianapolis was "the one interesting building" in the city.

In the early years of the Kennedy administration, the plan to redesign Pennsylvania Avenue was the most significant redevelopment project in the country. Owings was a leading figure in the team which developed the preliminary design during more than a year of closely guarded, top-level work. He was chairman of the Temporary Commission on Pennsylvania Avenue (1964–1973), and he was named to the Permanent Commission as well. He advocated returning portions of the National Mall to pedestrian use and restricting further developmental growth in that region.

Owings and Daniel Patrick Moynihan, then urban affairs adviser in President Richard Nixon's administration, were ultimately credited with the success of the master plan for the Washington Mall and for the redesign of Pennsylvania Avenue as the capital's grand ceremonial boulevard. Owings' indirect influence continued after this planning phase was completed. His SOM protégé was David Childs, who was later appointed by President Gerald Ford as chairman of the National Capital Planning Commission.

As chairman of the Board of Control for the Urban Design Concept team for the Interstate Highway System in Baltimore, he worked to restrict the development of a large highway through the city. He was a member of the Secretary of the Interior's advisory board for National Parks, Historic Sites, Buildings and Monuments in Washington, D.C. (1967–1970), and later as Chairman of that Board (1970–1972). In this same period, he also served as co-chairman of the executive committee of the Human Resources Council (1970). He was honored for his service on or contribution to the California Advisory Committee on a Master Plan for Scenic Highways, the Monterey coast master plan, the Pennsylvania Avenue Development Corporation, and the President's Council on Pennsylvania.

== Later years ==
Owings moved to San Francisco in 1951. Owings first marriage to the former Emily Otis ended in divorce. Through the influence of Owings, in late 1957 his firm sent the architectural photographer Morley Baer to Europe to photograph SOM-built buildings. That resulted in Baer being able to stay on for a year and produce a set of striking photographs of pre-tourist southern Spain, especially of Andalucia.

=== Big Sur ===
Owings built a unique A-frame home at Big Sur, California in 1958 on the site where he proposed to his second wife Margaret Wentworth Owings. The residence, later nicknamed the "Wild Bird House", was a permanent vacation home for them. Time magazine labeled it "the most beautiful house on the most beautiful site" in the United States. With his wife, Nathaniel drafted the Big Sur Land Use Plan, a master plan to protect Big Sur's scenic coastline. This work became the foundation for Big Sur's eventual land-use policies; and this was a crucial step in Owings's move towards his eventual role as environmental activist and spokesman. This project introduced Owings to environmental concerns and was the first of many contributions to conservation and preservation campaigns. His memory is commemorated in the Nathaniel Owings Memorial Redwood Grove at Big Sur. After both his and his wife's deaths, the house was sold in 2000 for $5,650,000.

=== Santa Fe ===
Owings' close personal ties to the Santa Fe area date back to 1944, when he and his first wife, Emily, came to live in Santa Fe. They built a house in Pojoaque, New Mexico where they raised their family of four children. He and his family continued to maintain their long-standing connection to the area community.

In later years, Owings kept a home near Nambé Pueblo, New Mexico; and in due course, he came to be known as an active preservationist in the Santa Fe region. One noteworthy success was in Las Trampas, New Mexico, where the 1760s San José de Gracia Church was saved from highway demolition by a coalition of villagers and Santa Fe citizens.

Owings died at age 81 in Santa Fe, New Mexico on June 13, 1984. He was survived by his second wife, Margaret Wentworth Owings.

== Notable projects ==
In his long career, Owings presided over more than $3 billion in construction projects, including:

- 1962—Air Force Academy Chapel at Colorado Springs, Colorado
- 1968—Wells College Library at Aurora, New York
- 1970—John Hancock Center, at Chicago, Illinois
- 1971—Weyerhaeuser Headquarters near Tacoma, Washington
- 1972—Haj Terminal at Jeddah, Saudi Arabia
- 1974—First Wisconsin Plaza at Madison, Wisconsin
- 1976—Sears Tower at Chicago, Illinois
- 1982—Enerplex, North Building at Princeton, New Jersey

=== Selected works ===
- 1969—The American Aesthetic (with William Garnett). New York: Harper & Row.
- 1973—The Spaces in Between: An Architect's Journey. New York: Houghton Mifflin.

=== Honors ===
- 1983—American Institute of Architects Gold Medal.
- 1983—Honorary Doctorate of Fine Arts, University of New Mexico
- 1961 – Elected into the National Academy of Design
