= Edward Charles Bassett =

American architect (1921–1999)

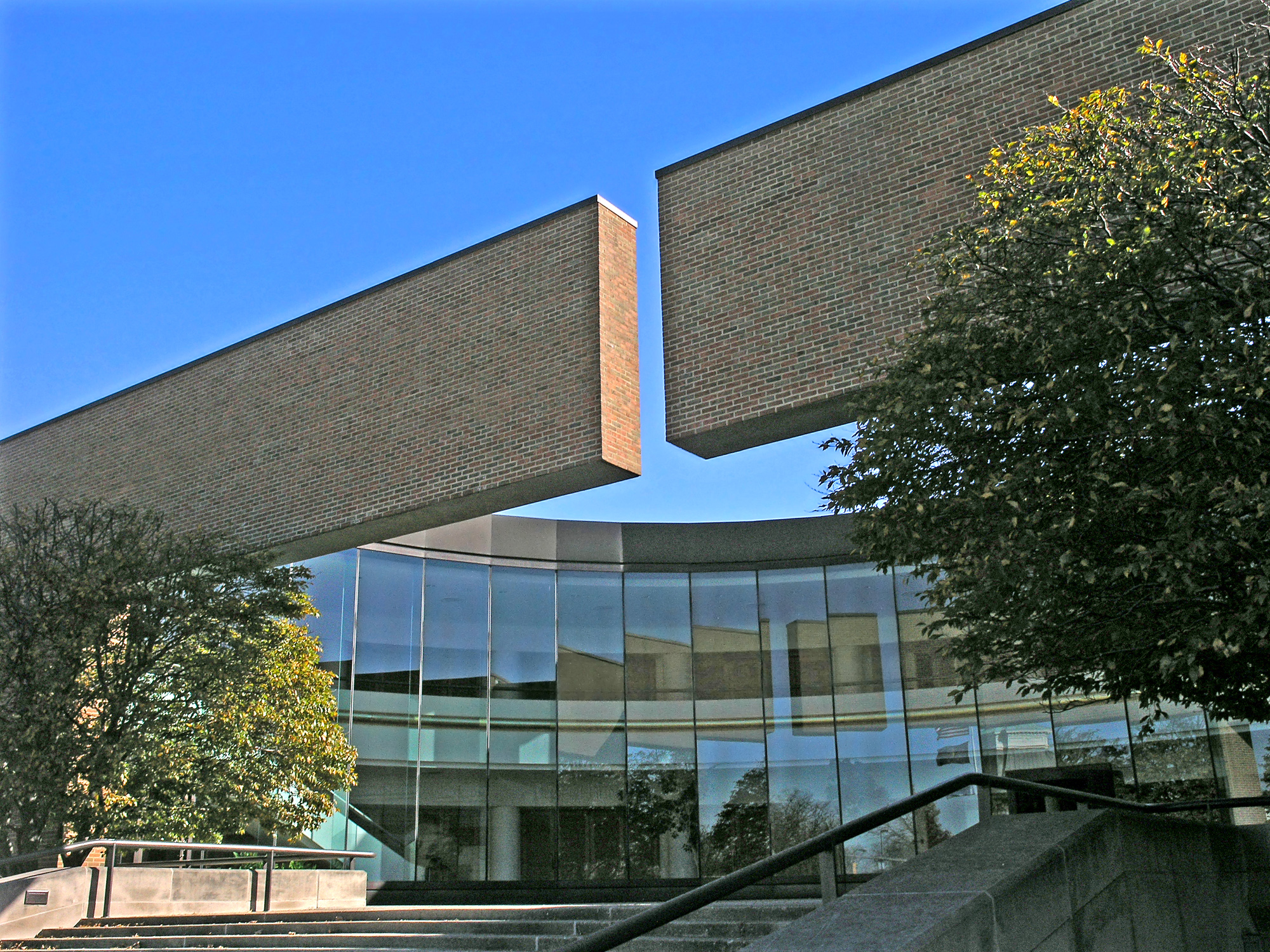
City Hall, Columbus, Indiana

Edward Charles "Chuck" Bassett (1921–1999) was an American architect based in San Francisco.

== History ==
Edward Charles Bassett was born on September 12, 1921 in Port Huron, Michigan. Between high school and college Bassett worked for his father’s architectural firm. Bassett earned his B.S. in Architecture from the University of Michigan Ann Arbor. He continued his education at Cranbrook Academy of art in Bloomfield Hills, Michigan, earning a Master of Art in Architecture in 1951. Bassett was a Fellow at the American Academy in Rome in 1970.

He served as design partner in the San Francisco office of Skidmore, Owings and Merrill for 26 years, from 1955 through his retirement in 1981. He was elected into the National Academy of Design as an Associate member in 1970, and became a full member in 1990.

He died at age 77, from complications from a stroke only days prior.

Bassett's designs include:

- Oakland–Alameda County Coliseum, Oakland, California, 1962–1966
- El Paso Energy Building, originally the Tenneco Building, Houston, Texas, 1963
- 650 California Street, San Francisco, California, 1964
- Mauna Kea Beach Hotel, Hawaii, 1965
- Bechtel Building, San Francisco, California, 1967
- Weyerhaeuser Corporate Headquarters, Federal Way, Washington, 1971
- Louise M. Davies Symphony Hall, San Francisco, 1980
- City Hall, Columbus, Indiana, 1981
- Southeast Financial Center, Miami, Florida, 1983
- Crocker Galleria, San Francisco, California, 1982

== Honors and awards ==
- Arnold W. Brummer Prize in Architecture, 1963
- American Institute of Architects, Fellow, 1977
- San Francisco Arts Commission, Award of Honor for Architecture, 1985
