= Weyerhaeuser Corporate Headquarters =

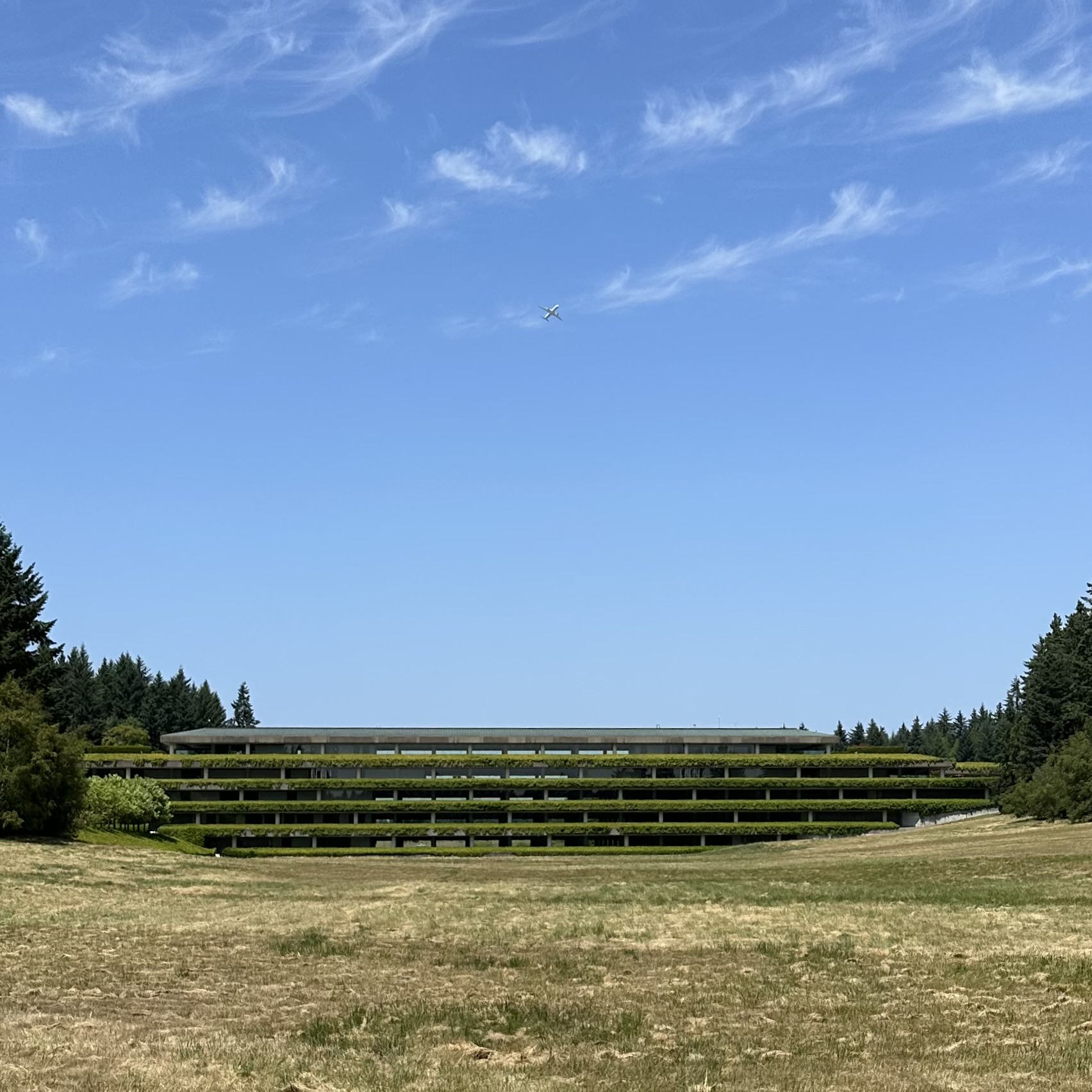
- Interactive map of the Weyerhaeuser Corporate Headquarters area
- Alternative names: Woodbridge Corporate Park

General information
- Architectural style: Modern
- Location: 33663 Weyerhaeuser Way S Federal Way, WA 98001
- Coordinates: 47.2969°N 122.2987°W
- Opened: 1971
- Owner: Weyerhaeuser (1971–2016); Industrial Realty Group (2016–present)

Height
- Height: 70 feet

Technical details
- Floor count: 5
- Floor area: 358,000 square feet

Design and construction
- Architects: Edward Charles Bassett; Peter Walker (landscape architect)
- Architecture firm: Skidmore, Owings & Merrill; Sasaki, Walker & Associates

Website
- IRG — Woodbridge Corporate Park; SOM — Weyerhaeuser Corporate Headquarters

The Weyerhaeuser Corporate Headquarters is a modernist building in Federal Way, Washington and the former home of timberland company Weyerhaeuser. The campus was designed by architect Edward Charles Bassett and landscape architect Peter Walker.

The campus was sold by Weyerhaeuser in 2016 when the company moved to a new office in Seattle's Pioneer Square. The property was purchased by Industrial Realty Group and renamed to Woodbridge Corporate Park.
