= Matitone =

Building in Genoa, Italy

- Interactive map of the Matitone area

General information
- Status: Completed
- Type: Office
- Location: Genoa, Italy
- Coordinates: 44.4113°N 8.9066°E
- Construction started: 1987
- Completed: 1990
- Inaugurated: 1992

Height
- Roof: 109 m (358 ft)

Technical details
- Floor count: 26

Design and construction
- Architects: Skidmore, Owings & Merrill, Mario Lanata, Andrea Messina

The Matitone (a popular nickname meaning literally "big pencil", officially San Benigno North Tower) is a high-rise office building in the San Teodoro district of the San Benigno area in Genoa, Italy. Built between 1987 and 1990, and inaugurated in 1992, the tower stands at 109 m (358 ft) tall with 26 floors. It was designed by Skidmore, Owings & Merrill, Mario Lanata and Andrea Messina and is currently used as a business center. It has been the tallest building in Genoa since its completion in 1992.

== History ==
The building was designed by Skidmore, Owings and Merrill in the late 1980s, one of the largest American engineering, architecture and urban planning firms, in collaboration with architects Mario Lanata and Andrea Messina to become a modern office building. Construction of the complex began on November 16, 1987, and was completed in November 1990, in view of the 1992 Columbiades.

=== Architecture ===
The skyscraper is located in the San Teodoro district, in the San Benigno area, near the Genova-Ovest motorway toll booth and the Dinegro station of the Genoa metro. It is positioned opposite the Lanterna tower, remaining visible both from the port and from the entire western area of the city. It is one of the tallest and most characteristic buildings in the Ligurian capital, by virtue of its particular architectural shape that resembles a pencil.

It is 109 metres high, divided into 26 floors above ground. It is the tallest building in Genoa, exceeding the central Torre Piacentini by just one metre. The skyscraper has three buildings: the offices in the centre, the car parks to the west and the commercial area to the east, between via Cantore and via di Francia.

The intention was not to build a pencil-shaped building, but the architectural form of the building earned it the popular nickname of "Matitone" due to its resemblance to a large pencil and which would instead be inspired by the octagonal bell tower of the church of San Donato located in the historic center of Genoa. The facades have a covering of alternating bands of gray granite and green glass. The pyramidal roof, however, is made of copper. The flag with the cross of St. George, symbol of Genoa, flies on its summit.

The skyscraper is currently also home to some offices of the Municipality of Genoa. In Savona there is the "Matitino", a small skyscraper that has similar shapes to the Matitone and was named in this way to remember its "big" Genoese brother.

=== Trivia ===
The Matitone is home to several administrative offices including:

- Municipality of Genoa, Services Private Building and Urban Development.
- In 2006 it was used for filming the video for the song Cosa vuoi che sia by Ligabue.
- In Savona there is a smaller, similar building that was named Matitino in honor of his older peer in Genoa.

== Gallery ==
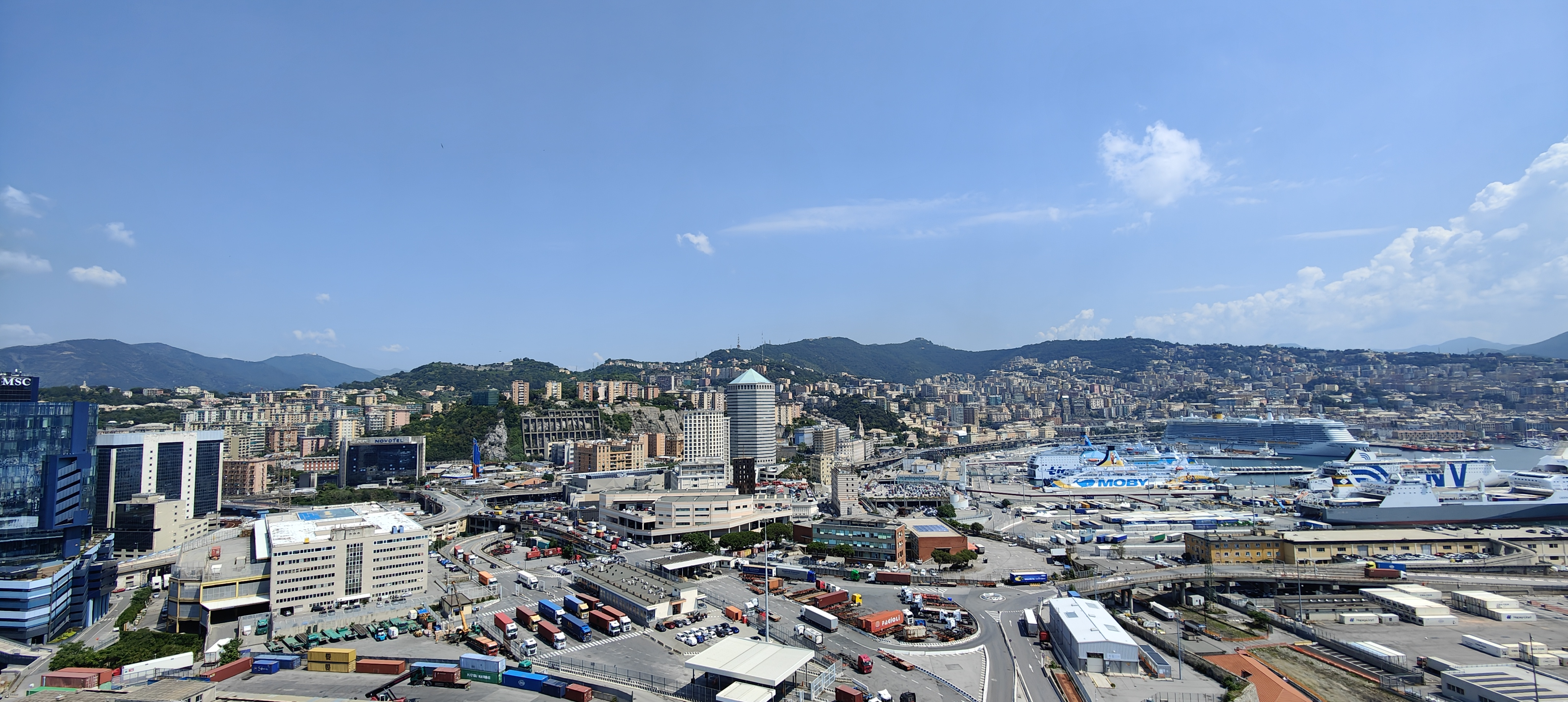
The Matitone (in the center) seen from the Lantern

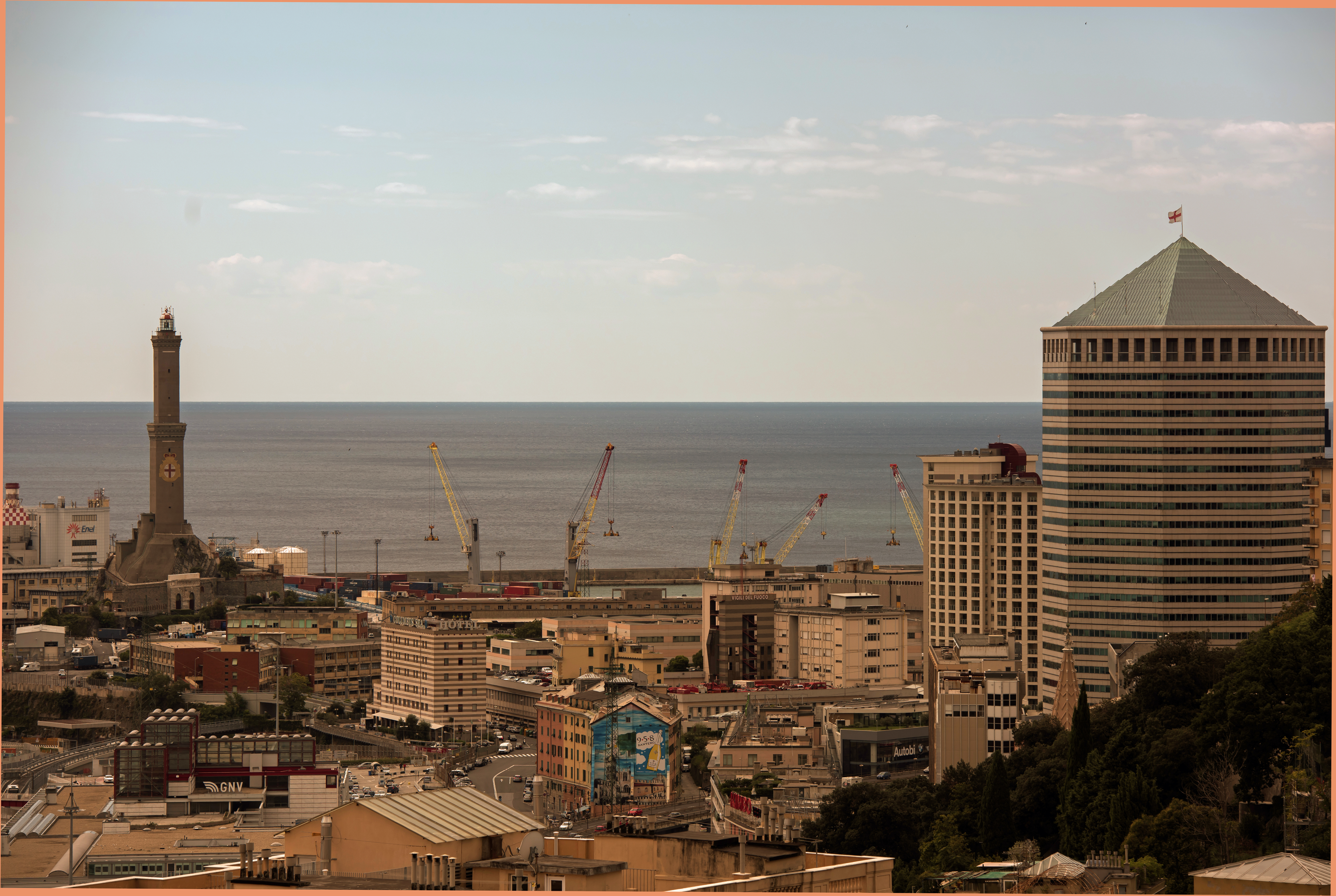
The Pencil with the Lantern, photographed from the Colle di San Benigno

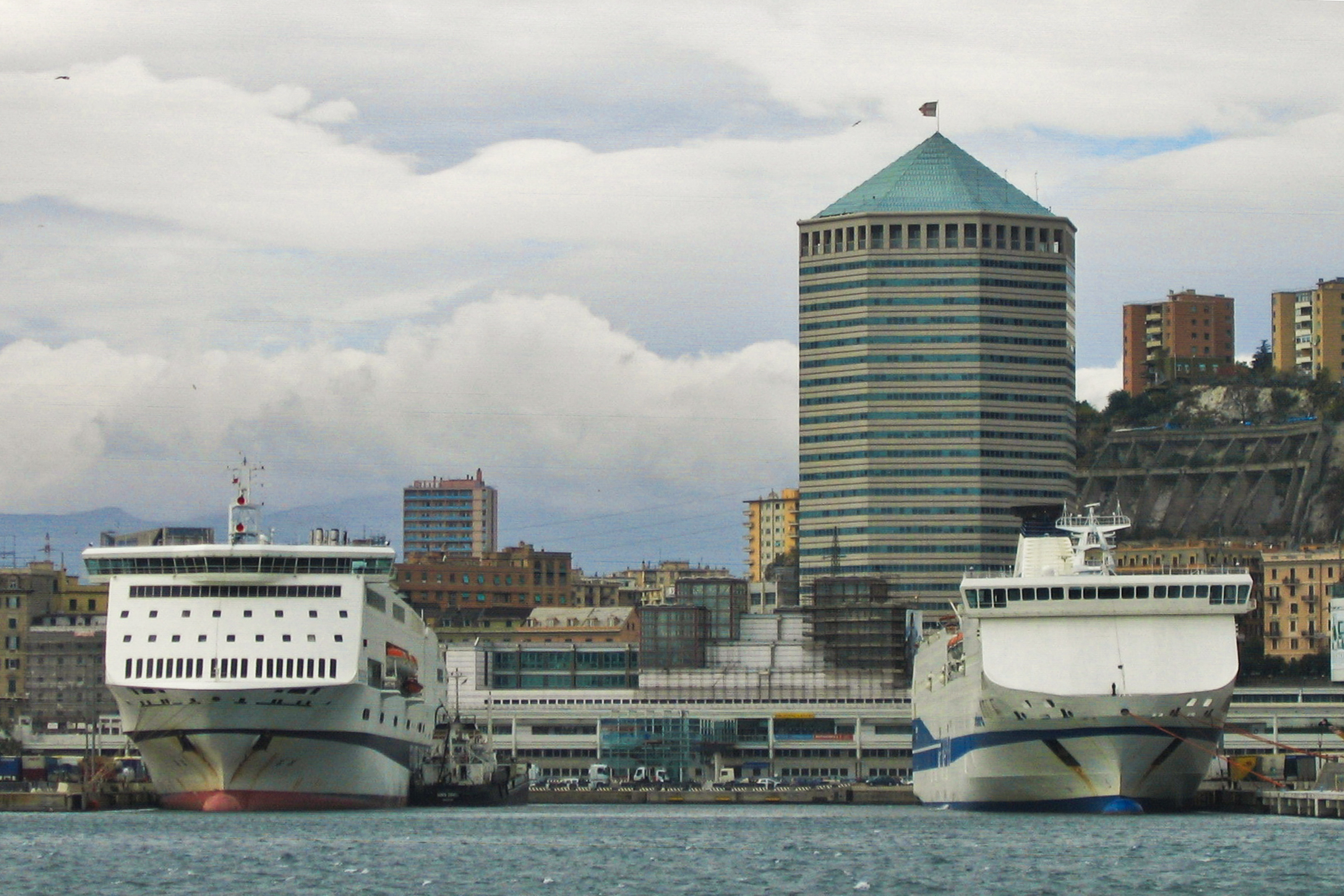
The Matitone seen from the port

== See also ==
- List of tallest buildings in Genoa

Records
Preceded by Piacentini Tower	Tallest Building in Genoa; 1992—present 109 m	Succeeded by Incumbent
