= San Vincenzo Tower =

Skyscraper in Genoa, Italy

- Torre San Vincenzo (Italian)
- Interactive map of the San Vincenzo Tower area

General information
- Status: Completed
- Type: Office
- Location: Genoa, Italy, 2 Via San Vincenzo, Genoa, Italy
- Coordinates: 44.40648°N 8.94515°E
- Completed: 1967

Height
- Roof: 105 m (344 ft)

Technical details
- Structural system: Concrete
- Floor count: 23 (+2 underground)

Design and construction
- Architects: Melchiorre Bega; Piero Gambacciani e Associati
- Structural engineer: Montaldo

The San Vincenzo Tower (Italian: Torre San Vincenzo) also known as the SIP Tower or Telecom Italia Tower is a high-rise office building in the San Vincenzo district of Genoa, Italy. Inaugurated in 1967, the tower stands at 105 m (344 ft) tall with 23 floors and is the current third tallest building in Genoa.

== History ==
=== Architecture ===
Built in the 1960s and designed by Melchiorre Bega, Piero Gambacciani and Attilio Viziano, it stands in the San Vincenzo area, opposite the Genova Brignole railway station. The building housed the offices of SIP and, later, of Telecom Italia.

The tower's design and construction exemplified a visionary approach to post-war modernism in Genoa: the skyscraper was built and enveloped completely in metal, a feat that had been technologically and structurally unimaginable for the Italian construction sector before this. Prefabricated metal components were combined, welded, or screwed into groups to create three levels. The ground level is recessed from the street facades. Smoky green glass facades on every side are topped at an angle with metal cladding.

The skyscraper, renovated in the early 2000s, is home to associations and businesses. Since 2005, it has housed the Genoa headquarters of Confindustria, which occupies three floors of the building. Since 2022, it has also housed the offices of Italian Labor Union (UIL) Liguria. The tower has an official height of 105 metres and rises to 26 floors + 2 underground floors.

== See also ==
- List of tallest buildings in Italy
- List of tallest buildings in Genoa
