= Corte Lambruschini =

Skyscraper in Genoa, Italy

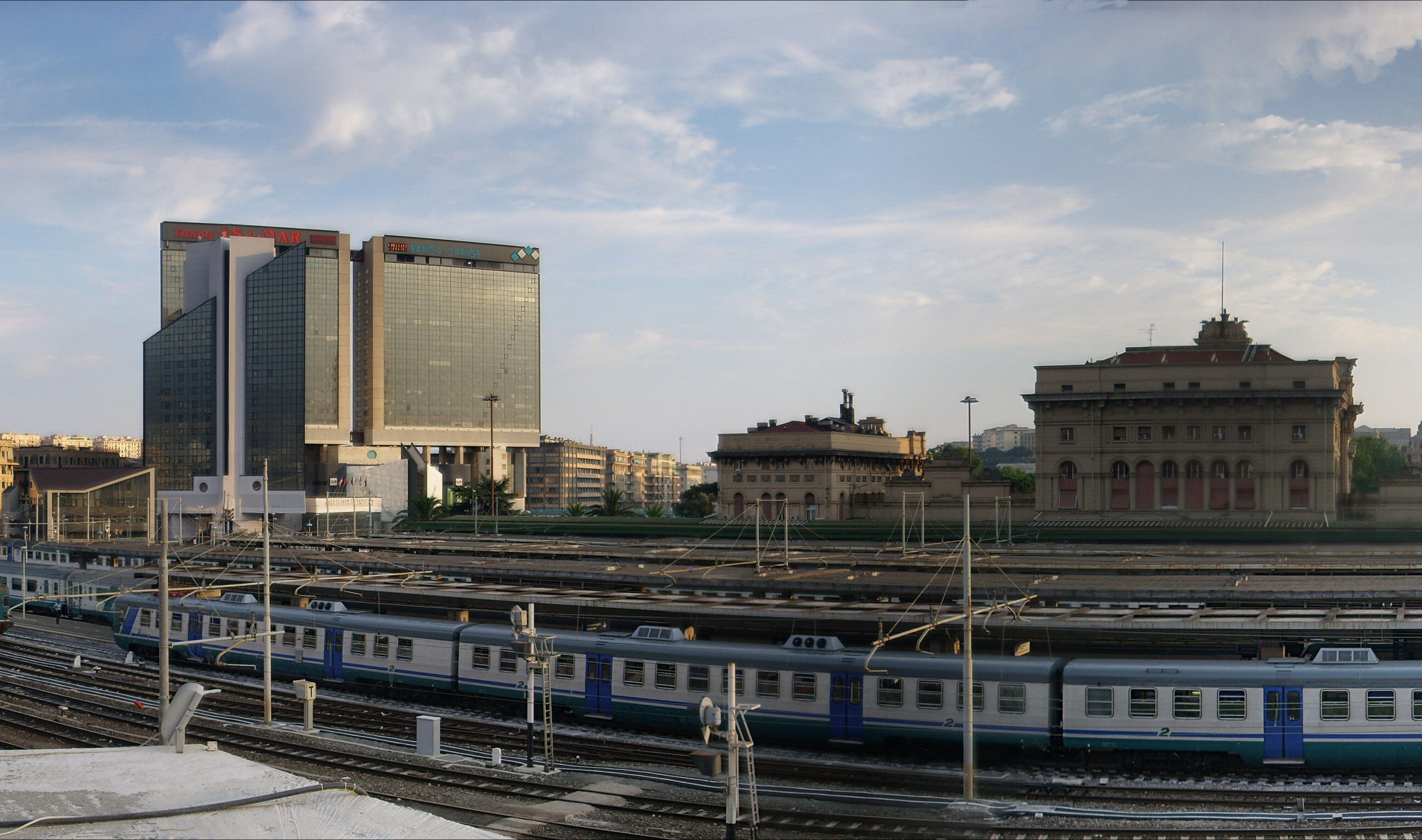
- Corte Lambruschini in 2013
- Interactive map of the Corte Lambruschini area

General information
- Location: Genoa, Italy
- Coordinates: 44°24′16.28″N 8°56′53.3″E
- Completed: 2014

Height
- Roof: 87 m (285 ft)

Technical details
- Floor count: 20

Corte Lambruschini is a building complex located in Genoa, Italy.

== History ==
The building takes its name from a nineteenth-century courtyard housing block, used as a market and workers' dwellings, known as Corte Lambruschini, which once stood in what was then Borgo Pila. The complex was demolished in 1982 to make way for the skyscrapers of the new business complex.

Construction work on the complex, designed by architect Piero Gambacciani, began in 1987 and was completed in 1990. The structural design was carried out by engineer Elio Montaldo. The project, developed through a public–private partnership with a division of ownership between the Municipality of Genoa and the promoting company, formed part of the broader programme through which the city of Genoa equipped itself with new business districts between the 1970s and 1980s, in preparation for the 1990 FIFA World Cup and the Columbian celebrations of 1992.

== Description ==
The complex is located in the Borgo Pila district, a short distance from Genova Brignole railway station and Piazza della Vittoria.

It comprises two office towers, a hotel tower, a smaller building originally intended as a municipal facility (later used as a bank), a 1,100-seat theatre, a large car park, and ground-floor retail spaces arranged around a central square. The two office towers rise to a height of 87 metres (285 ft) over 20 storeys and are aligned along the diagonal of the site, while the 16-storey hotel tower, with its triangular plan, is set at right angles to them. The buildings are linked by a system of elevated pedestrian walkways. Structurally, the complex adopts a mixed construction system, with reinforced-concrete basements and steel-framed upper levels, all clad in glazed façades.

== Gallery ==
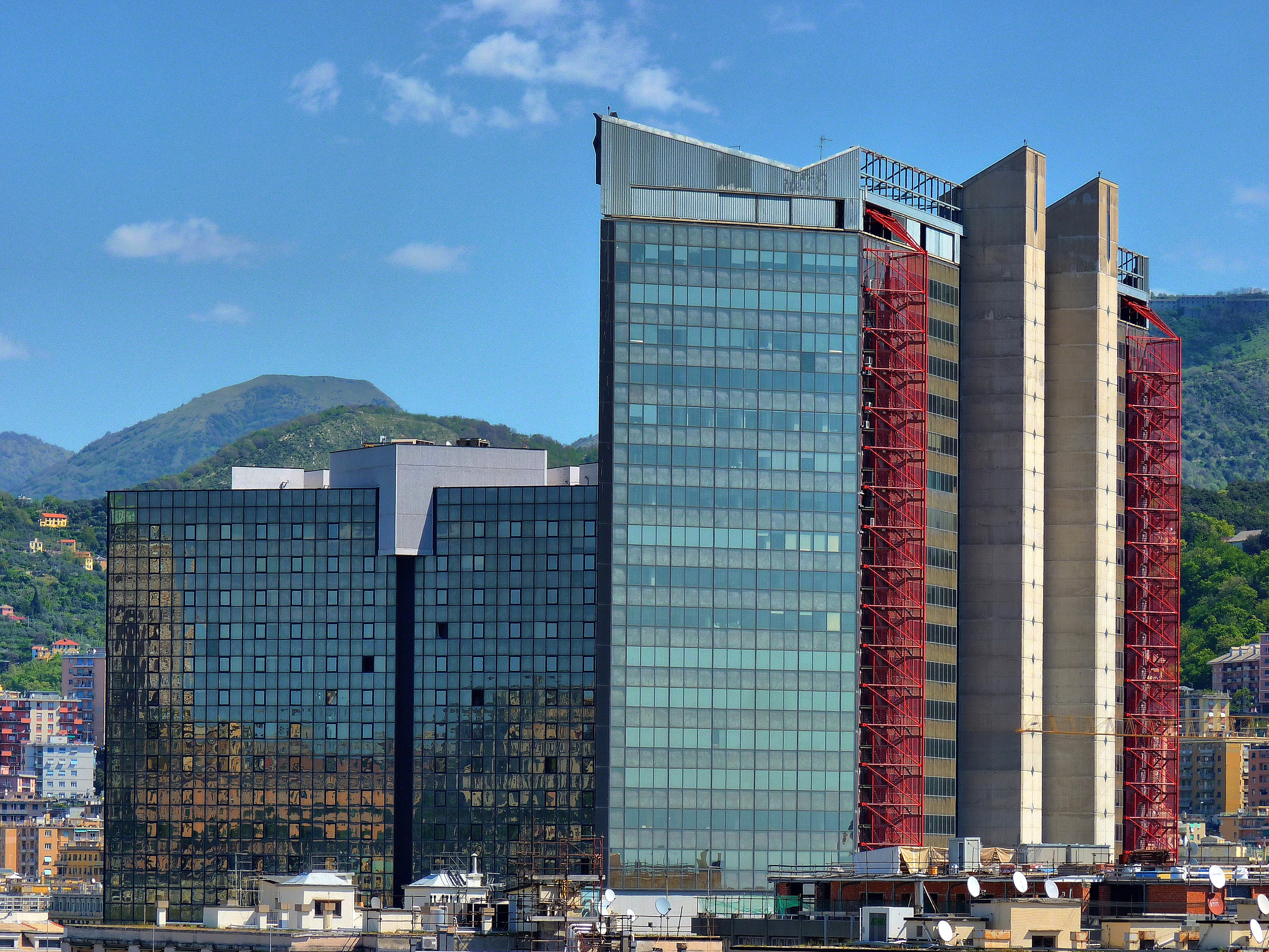

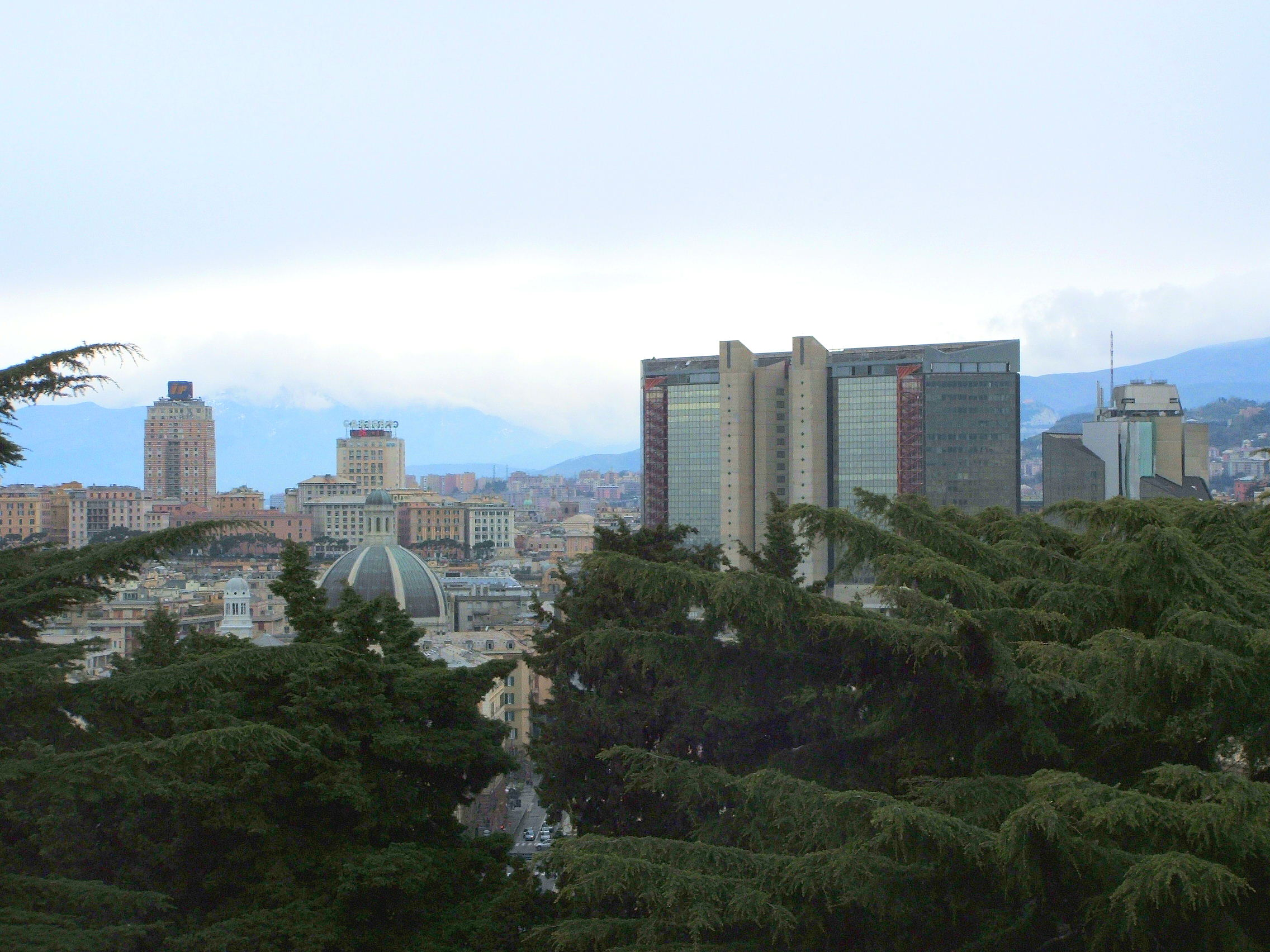
