= Piacentini Tower =

Skyscraper in Genoa, Italy

- Torre Piacentini (Italian)
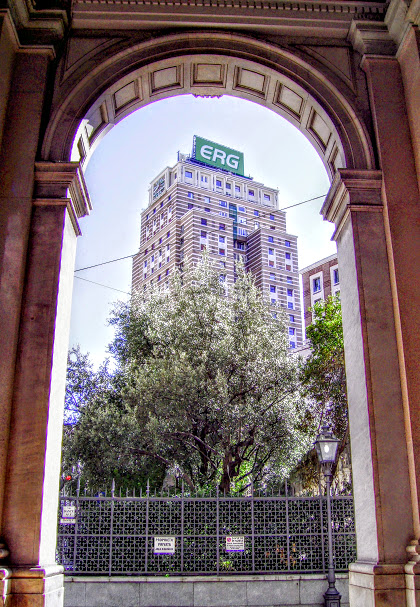
- Piacentini Tower in Genoa
- Interactive map of the Piacentini Tower area

General information
- Location: Genoa, Italy
- Coordinates: 44°24′20″N 8°56′09″E
- Construction started: 1935
- Completed: 1940

Height
- Roof: 108 m (354 ft)

Technical details
- Floor count: 31

The Piacentini Tower (Italian: Torre Piacentini), also known as the Terrazza Martini Tower (Italian: Torre della Terrazza Martini), is a highrise building located in Genoa, Italy. Construction on the building began in 1935, and finished in 1940. It was designed by Marcello Piacentini and Angelo Invernizzi. It has 31 floors, and contains office spaces. Its roof height is 108 m, and counting its spire, the full building height is 116 m.

At the time of construction it was the tallest building in Europe, until 1952, when the Kotelnicheskaya Embankment was built in Moscow.

== See also ==
- List of tallest buildings in Genoa

Records
Preceded by Dante 3	Tallest Building in Genoa; 1940—1992; 108 m	Succeeded by Matitone
Preceded by Vienna City Hall	Tallest Building in Europe; 1940—1952; 108 m	Succeeded by Kotelnicheskaya Embankment Building
