= MSC Tower =

Skyscraper in Genoa, Italy

- Torre MSC (Italian)
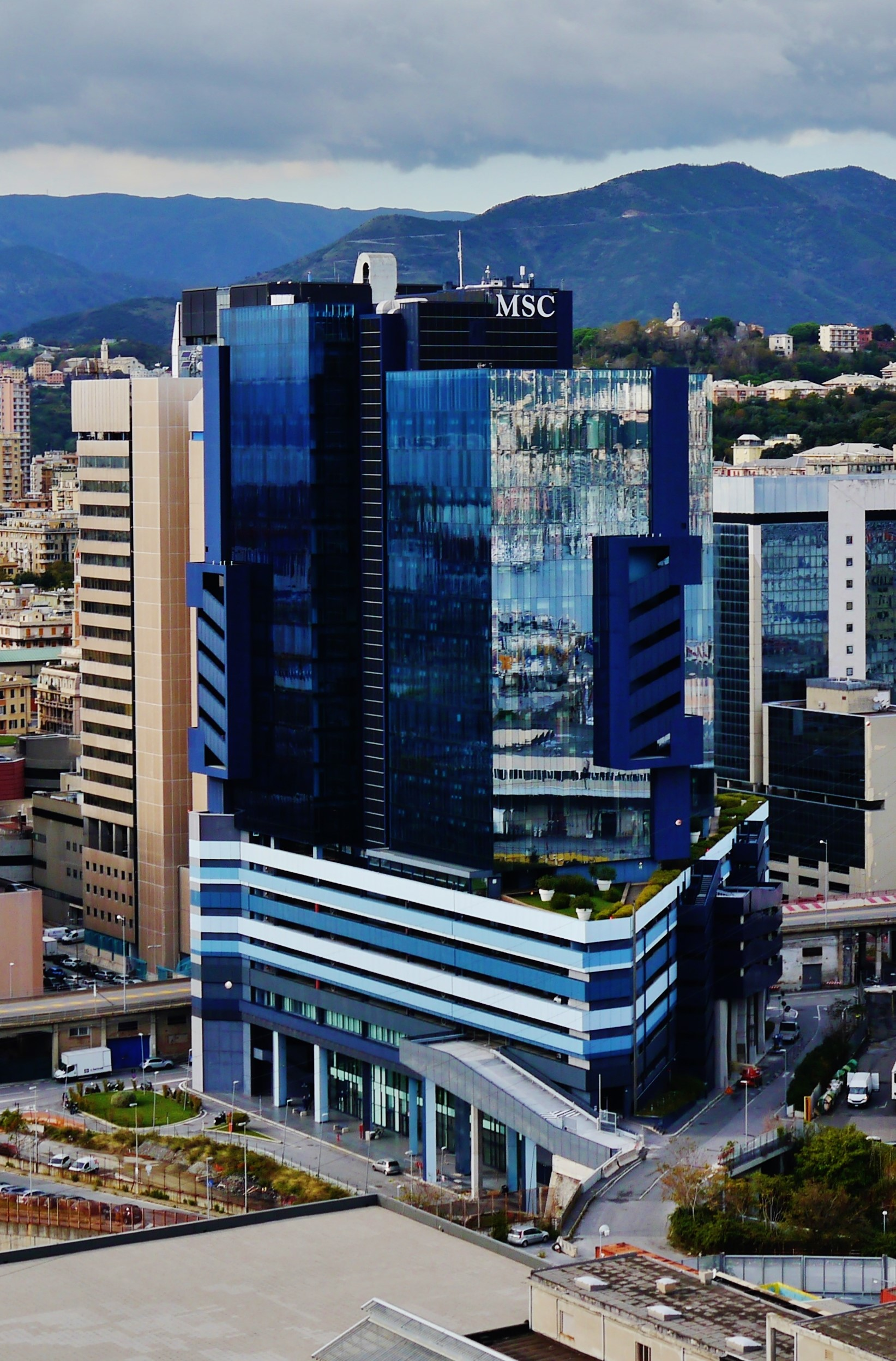
- MSC Tower in 2020
- Interactive map of the MSC Tower area

General information
- Location: Genoa, Italy
- Coordinates: 44°24′26.41″N 8°54′07.07″E
- Completed: 2014

Height
- Roof: 100 m (328 ft)

Technical details
- Floor count: 23

The MSC Tower (Italian: Torre MSC) is an office skyscraper located in Genoa, Italy.

== History ==
Construction works of the building, known as Centro Direzionale di San Benigno - Comparto 2 during its development phase, began in 2008 and were completed in 2014.

== Description ==
The building is 100 metres (330 ft) tall, which makes it the 5th-tallest in Genoa. The building consists of a 10-story podium designated for parking and an upper section made by three intersecting volumes occupied by commercial spaces and offices.

== Gallery ==
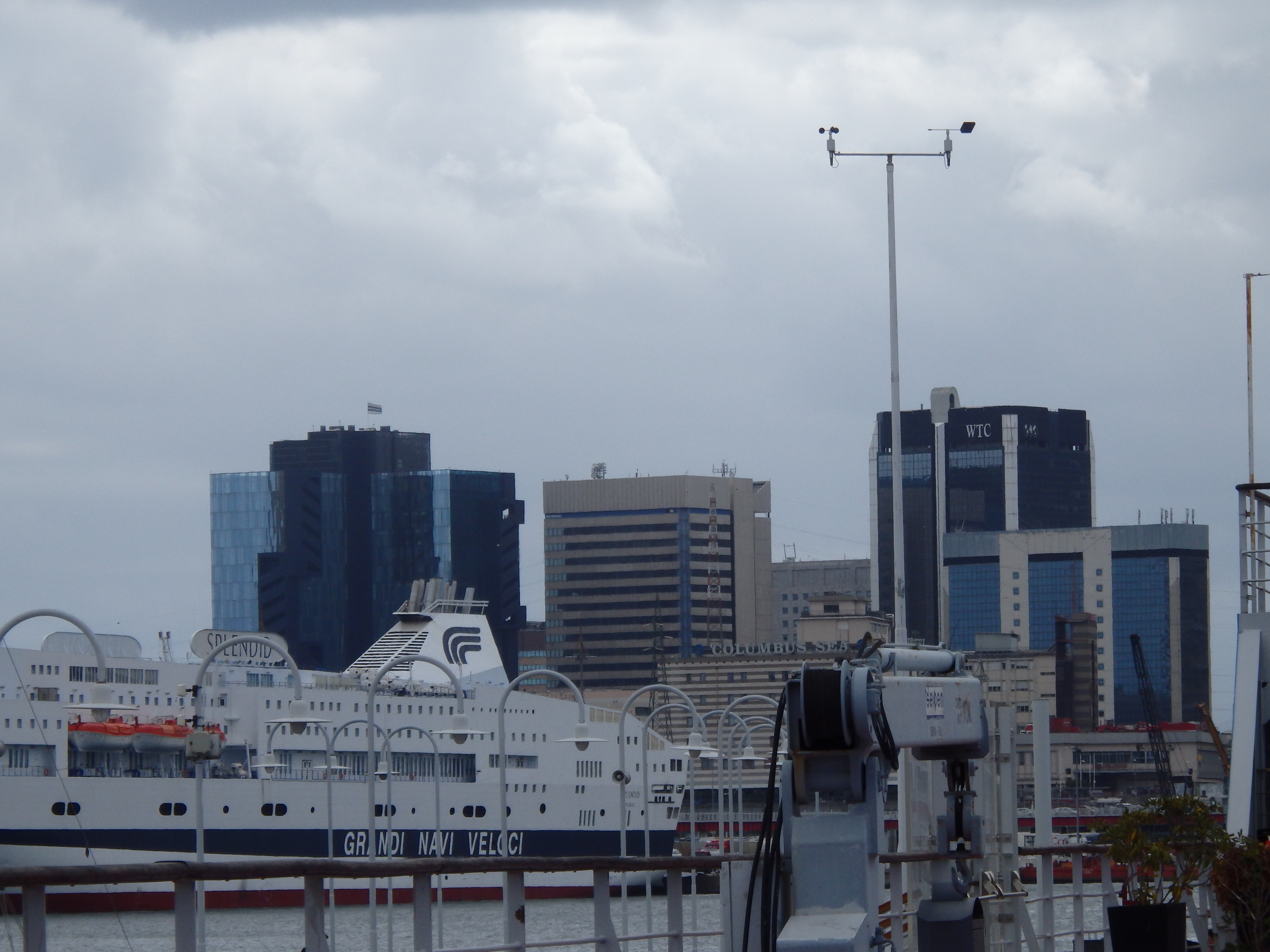

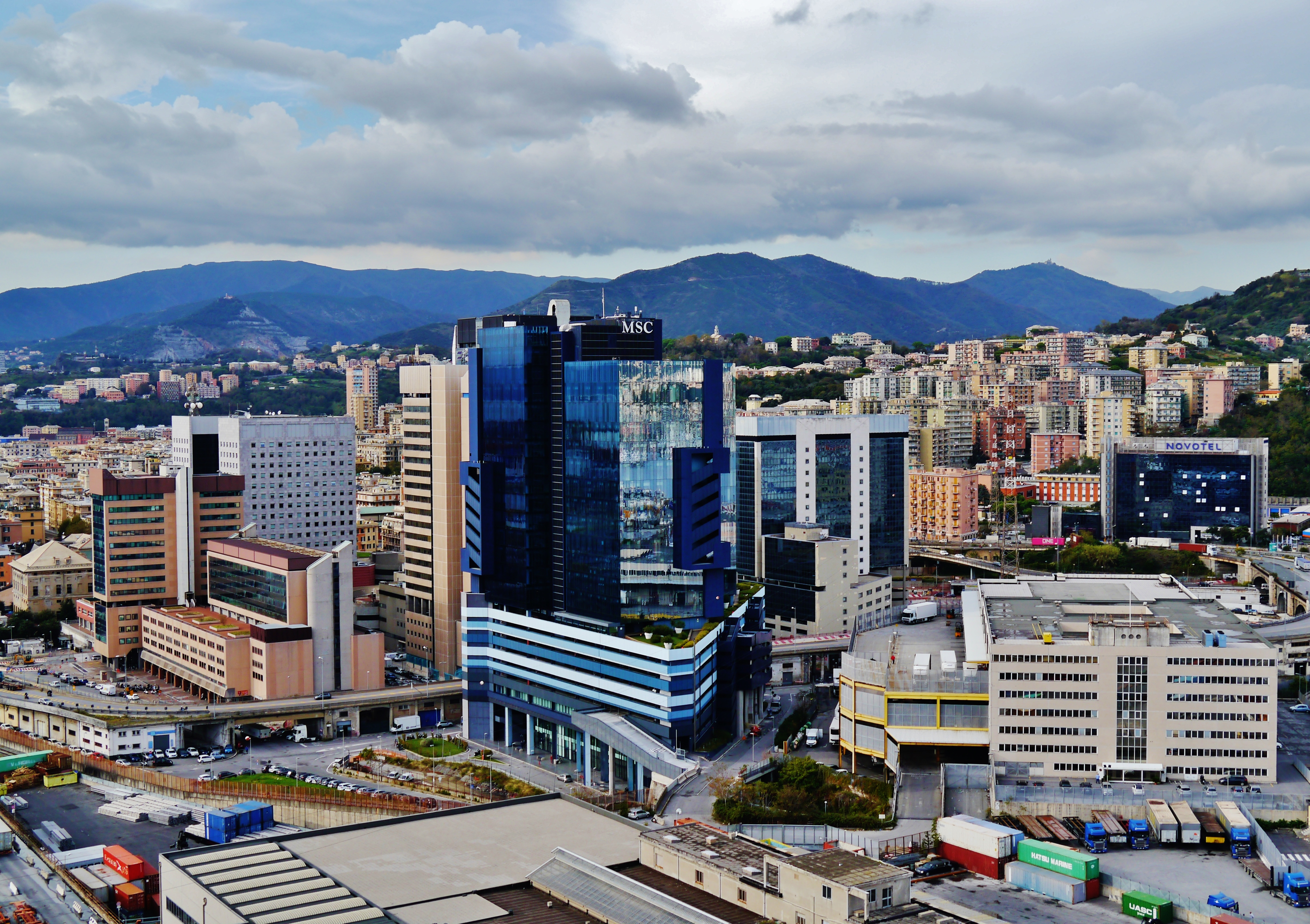

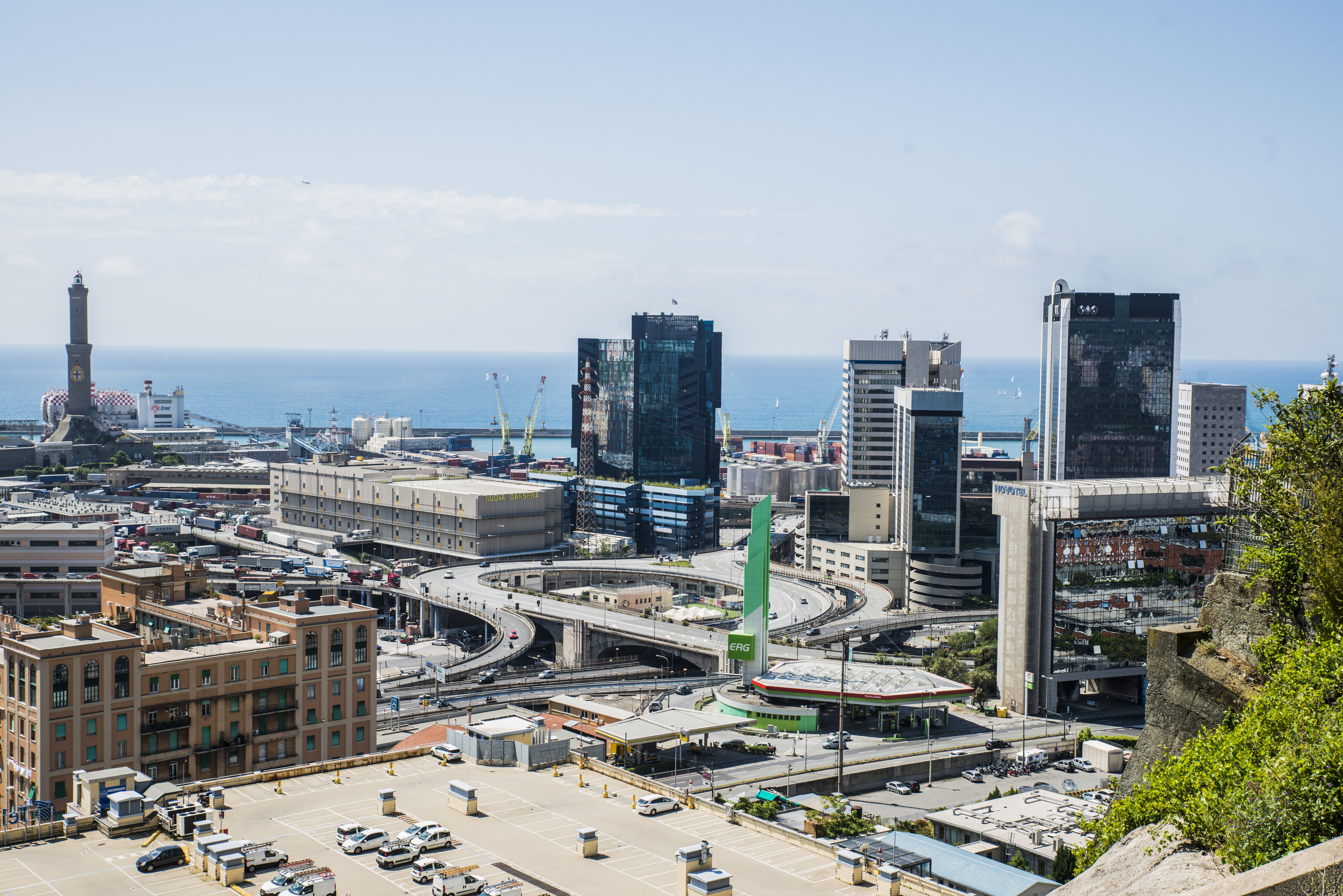
