= SOM (architectural firm) =

American architectural and engineering firm

Skidmore, Owings & Merrill LLP
- Trade name: SOM
- Type: Private
- Industry: Professional services
- Founded: 1936; 90 years ago, in Chicago, Illinois, U.S.
- Founders: Louis Skidmore; Nathaniel Owings; John Merrill
- Headquarters: Chicago, Illinois, U.S.
- Area served: Worldwide
- Services: Architecture
- Revenue: $347 million (2021)
- Website: www.som.com

Skidmore, Owings & Merrill LLP (branded as SOM) is an American architectural, urban planning, and engineering firm with headquarters in Chicago, Illinois. It was founded in 1936 by Louis Skidmore and Nathaniel Owings. In 1939, they were joined by engineer John O. Merrill. The firm opened its second office, in New York City, in 1937. It subsequently expanded, with offices in San Francisco, Los Angeles, Washington, D.C., London, Melbourne, Hong Kong, Shanghai, Seattle, and Dubai.

Notable for its role in the development of modernist architecture in the United States and for its work in skyscraper design and construction, SOM has designed numerous prominent architectural and urban projects, including several of the world's tallest buildings. Among these are the John Hancock Center (1969, second tallest in the world when built); the Willis Tower (1973, tallest in the world for almost twenty-five years); the One World Trade Center (2014, currently the seventh tallest in the world); and the Burj Khalifa (2010, currently the world's tallest building). The firm's notable current work includes the new headquarters for the Walt Disney Company, the global headquarters for Citigroup, Moynihan Train Hall and the expanded Penn Station complex, and the restoration and renovation of the Waldorf Astoria in New York City; airport projects at O'Hare International Airport, Kansas City International Airport, and Kempegowda International Airport; urban master plans for the Charenton-Bercy district in Paris, New Covent Garden in London, Treasure Island in San Francisco, the East Riverfront in Detroit; P.S. 62, the first net-zero-energy school in New York City; and the design of the Moon Village, a concept for the first permanent lunar settlement, developed with the European Space Agency and Massachusetts Institute of Technology.

SOM works across a range of scales and project types, providing services in architecture, building services/MEP engineering, digital design, graphics, interior design, structural engineering, civil engineering, sustainable design and urban design & planning.

== History ==
=== 20th century ===
The firm's first influential project was Lever House, completed in 1952 to become the first International Style office building in New York City. Constructed of glass and steel at a time when Park Avenue was lined with masonry buildings, Lever House introduced a modernist aesthetic.

In 1962, architectural historian Reyner Banham wrote: "It gave architectural expression to an age just as the age was being born. ... Lever House was an uncontrollable success, imitated and sometimes understood all over the Americanized world, and one of the sights of New York".

In the 1970s, SOM influenced a new era of skyscraper design with its work in Chicago, including the John Hancock Center (completed 1970) and Sears Tower (now Willis Tower), which became the world's tallest structure upon its completion in 1973 and remained so for more than 20 years. Both towers are the result of collaboration between architect Bruce Graham and engineer Fazlur Rahman Khan. Khan invented a tubular framing system that made it possible to build higher than ever before. This system has been adapted and is still used today for some of the world's most recent tallest buildings, including the 828-meter-tall Burj Khalifa, designed by SOM and completed in 2010.

In the 1960s and 1970s, SOM utilized computer-aided design, developing in-house digital tools that preceded the CAD systems used widely today. This work quickly proved valuable in the generation of structural analysis tools that were embraced by Fazlur Khan and his engineering team, aiding the design of projects such as the John Hancock Center.

The activity of an experimental research group at SOM, known as the Computer Group, is a significant group within the organization. Through the 1970s and 1980s, members of the relatively small, dedicated group pushed to integrate the computer's enhanced data-storing and analytical abilities into various phases of the design process. Through these initiatives, SOM was able to identify the potential of the computer to not only expedite necessary calculations but also introduce new ways of representing and sharing information. Just as structural engineering came to be seen early on at SOM as a means of generating rather than simply realizing architectural ideas, with concerted effort, computers gained credence at the firm, and eventually throughout the industry, as a catalyst for architectural innovation.

The Light Inside by James Turrell

In 1980, an in-house team at SOM created Architecture Engineering Systems, a computer program that was used to study complex structural systems and energy demands.

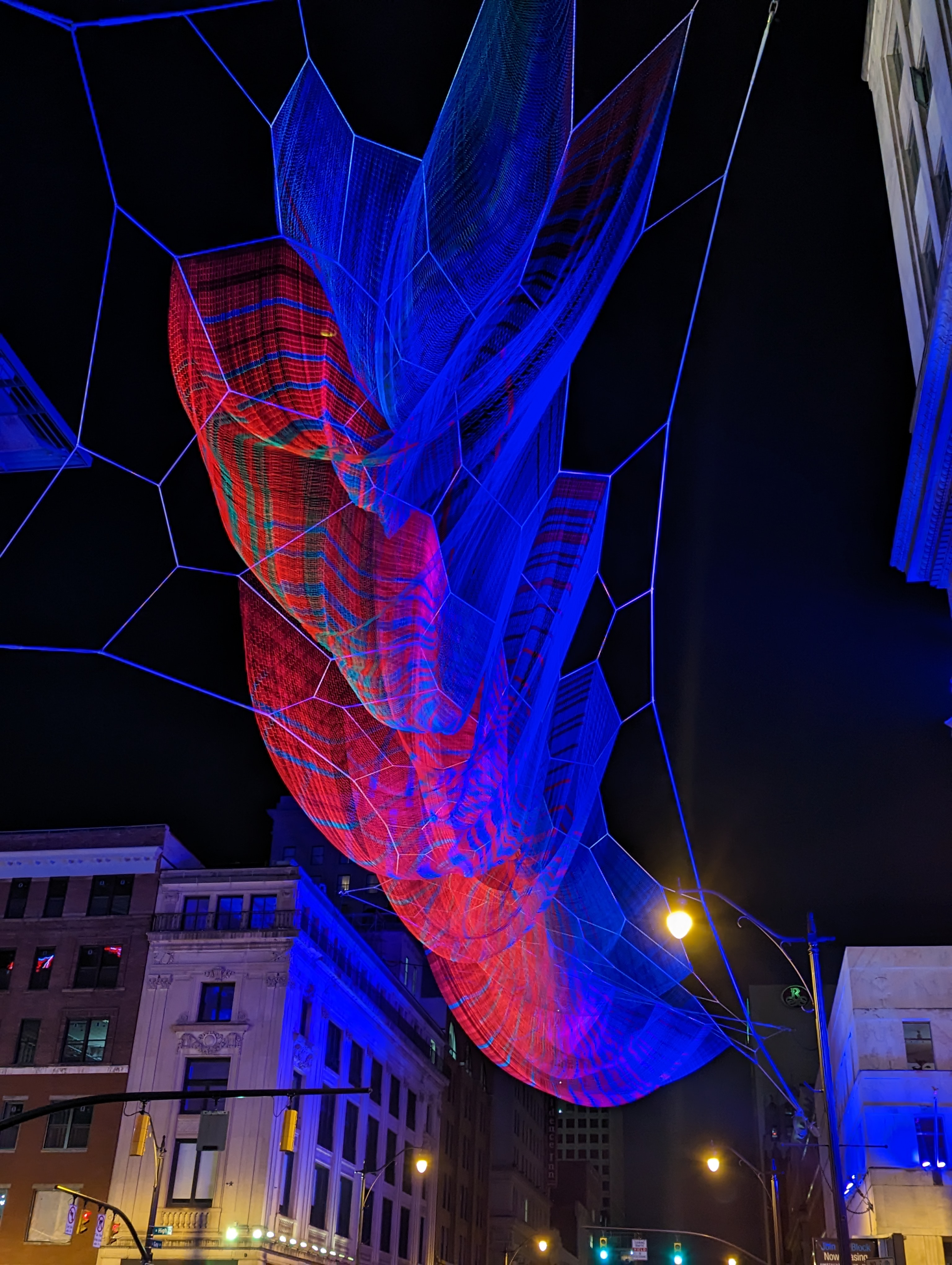
Current, Columbus, OH, 2023 By Janet Echelman

SOM's projects have featured works of art by significant artists. In many cases, the firm's architects and engineers played a role in commissioning, engineering, and installing the artworks—such as with the Chicago Picasso, a 50-foot-tall steel sculpture in the city's civic center. Joan Miró, Alexander Calder, Isamu Noguchi, Harry Bertoia, Richard Lippold, Jean Dubuffet and Chryssa are among the artists whose work has been a part of SOM projects. More recently, SOM's architects and engineers have collaborated with artists such as James Turrell, Janet Echelman, Iñigo Manglano–Ovalle, James Carpenter, and Jaume Plensa.

In 1953, the firm completed the Manufacturers Trust Company Building in New York City, the first international style bank building in the United States, Seven years later, in 1960, the firm completed Pepsi-Cola World Headquarters. In 1961, the firm completed One Chase Manhattan Plaza, which is now 28 Liberty Street, the first International Style building to rise in New York City's Financial District. The 28 Liberty Street project helped reverse an exodus of corporate clients from Lower Manhattan to Midtown Manhattan and the suburbs. SOM's design for 28 Liberty Street also created a plaza surrounding the tower, a novel concept that would be adapted in many future projects.

In Colorado Springs, Colorado, SOM planned a campus for the United States Air Force Academy. Built between 1958 and 1968, the campus broke from the traditions of West Point and Annapolis to become the first U.S. military academy designed in the modern style. The centerpiece of the campus is the Cadet Chapel, designed by architect Walter Netsch. The American Institute of Architects awarded the building with its prestigious Twenty-five Year Award, conferred onto "a building that has set a precedent for the last 25 to 35 years and continues to set standards of excellence for its architectural design and significance".

In 1969, SOM founder Nathaniel Owings wrote, "Civilizations leave marks on the Earth by which they are known and judged. In large measure, the nature of their immortality is gauged by how well their builders made peace with the environment." (source: Nathaniel Owings, "The American Aesthetic," Harper & Row, 1969) This ethos has shaped the firm's journey into sustainable practices. An early example is the corporate headquarters it designed for timberland company Weyerhaeuser, completed in 1971, which has been called the "original green building" not only for its integration into the surrounding landscape, but also for its use of efficient building systems.

=== 21st century ===
In 2007, the firm completed a large-scale sustainable architecture project for the U.S. Census Bureau, the first federal office building to receive LEED certification. Like Weyerhaeuser, the design of the campus works in concert with its natural surroundings and incorporates a range of design strategies to reduce its environmental impact.

In 2015, SOM completed the first net-zero-energy school building in New York City and one of the first worldwide. The Kathleen Grimm School for Leadership and Sustainability at Sandy Ground, Staten Island, has been awarded for its sustainability performance by organizations, including the American Institute of Architects, the Municipal Art Society, and the Urban Land Institute. SOM has been recognized for its research and experimentation with new energy-saving and carbon-reducing technologies, including a timber tower and a modified concrete slab design.

== People ==
=== Founders and notable architects ===
Gordon Bunshaft, who thrived as a design leader at SOM for more than 40 years, received the profession's highest honor, the Pritzker Architecture Prize, in 1988. Notable architects who are associated with SOM include: T. J. Gottesdiener, Edward Charles Bassett, Natalie de Blois, Gordon Bunshaft, David Childs, Robert Diamant, Philip Enquist, Myron Goldsmith, Bruce Graham, Gary Haney, Craig W. Hartman, Gertrude Kerbis, Fazlur Rahman Khan. Lucien Lagrange, Walter Netsch, Larry Oltmanns, Eszter Pécsi, Brigitte Peterhans, Norma Merrick Sklarek, Adrian Smith, and Marilyn Jordan Taylor

=== Women at SOM ===
Architect Sally Harkness, a founding partner at The Architects Collaborative in 1947, was interviewed at the firm during World War II along with her husband Chip Harkness, but only her husband received a job offer. In an interview later in life, Sally Harkness explained that she was told the firm did not believe in hiring women. Norma Merrick Sklarek, an African-American, was hired by SOM in 1955 after having been previously rejected by 19 other firms. She stayed there for 5 years, eventually starting her own firm. Patricia Weston Swan spent her 30-year career with SOM including many leadership roles but never achieved partner status, perceived by a colleague in the Denver office as evidence of the "glass ceiling" that was in place at that time at SOM.

When Julia Murphy, AIA joined SOM in 2008 there were no women partners and only a handful of directors. To attempt to address this imbalance, in 2010 she relaunched the Women's Initiative at SOM which had previously been active between 2002 and 2004.

The year 2020 marked a change in which three female partners, Carrie Byles, Xuan Fu, and Laura Ettelman were named to the executive committee of the 1250-person firm.

== Awards ==
Throughout its history, SOM has been recognized with more than 2000 awards for quality and innovation. In November 1990, SOM was placed on the cover of Interior Design Magazine for The Top Ten, Winner Of IBA. In 1996 and 1962, SOM received the Architecture Firm Award from the American Institute of Architects, which recognizes the design work of an entire firm. SOM is the only firm to have received this honor twice. In August 2009 SOM received four of 13 available R+D Awards from Architect Magazine. In addition, a collaboration between SOM and Rensselaer Polytechnic Institute, The Center for Architecture, Science and Ecology, was honored with a fifth award.

== Disciplines ==
=== Urban design and planning ===
Since the firm's founding, SOM has led large-scale urban design and planning projects. Many of these project locations include London, Chicago, New York City, Washington, D.C., Baltimore, Denver, and Portland, Oregon. SOM's City Design practice has made influential contributions to urban design approaches such as transit-oriented development, overbuild strategies and sustainable urbanism. In 1942, SOM was hired by the U.S. Army Corps of Engineers for the planning of Oak Ridge, Tennessee. By 1945, the town was home to 75,000 people. The work at Oak Ridge prepared SOM to take on other large-scale architectural and planning projects.

For more than 20 years, SOM was involved in the development of a master plan for the National Mall in Washington, D.C. In 1962, President John F. Kennedy appointed Nathaniel Owings as chair of the Pennsylvania Avenue redesign council, resulting in the 1966 Washington Mall Master Plan. A second master plan, developed in 1973, envisioned the construction of facilities including the National Air and Space Museum, the Hirshhorn Museum and Sculpture Garden, and the National Gallery of Art Sculpture Garden. In Baltimore in the 1960s, SOM contributed to preventing the destruction of the city's historic districts and Inner Harbor to make way for the planned construction of an elevated highway. As the chair of a team to develop an alternate plan, Nathaniel Owings convinced the Federal Highway Administration to sign off on a plan to reroute the highway. It was eventually built around the harbor and the historic Federal Hill district, saving these irreplaceable neighborhoods.

In the 1970s, SOM collaborated with landscape architect Lawrence Halprin to plan and design the Portland Transit Mall. The goals were to revitalize the Oregon city's downtown area, to encourage the use of mass transit, and create walkable streets. Another important commission in the 1970s was as the lead design firm for the Boston Transportation Planning Review, a metropolitan-wide re-design of Boston's transit and roadway infrastructure.

Beginning in the 1980s, SOM planned the design and construction of Canary Wharf in London. Intended to accommodate the financial sector and revitalize London's former Docklands, the plan included more than 20 building sites and a host of public spaces and amenities. The plan also provided for a larger transportation network including a light rail station that connects to the London Underground. The scale of the project led to the opening of SOM's London office in 1986. The firm's work at Canary Wharf continued into the 21st century, with the completion of Five Canada Square in 2002. In central London, the opportunity to build above rail lines near Liverpool Street Station spurred the construction of Broadgate, a new business district. SOM devised the master plan, and over three decades designed several of the site's 14 buildings. In order to build high-rise structures atop stations and a railyard, SOM's structural engineering team devised a deck over the tracks to allow for various building configurations on top. Exchange House, completed in 1990, is a building that acts as a bridge spanning the tracks. In 2008, Broadgate Tower, the district's tallest building, was completed. SOM designed public space enhancements for the area.

SOM designed the master plan for Chicago's Millennium Park, which opened in 2004. It was constructed above bus lanes, parking garages, and a rail yard. Below the great lawn, two new levels of parking were built, bus stops were added, and rail stations were renovated and expanded, including Millennium Station.

In Denver, SOM was commissioned to expand Union Station. 20 acres of former rail yards were converted into a transit-oriented urban district that orchestrates light rail, pedestrian, bicycle, and bus routes, as well as commuter and intercity rail. Completed in 2014, the project has spurred more than $3.5 billion worth of private investment in the surrounding district.

=== Structural engineering ===
The earliest SOM engineer was John O. Merrill. Fazlur Khan, another engineer at SOM, is best known for his design and construction of the Willis Tower (formerly the Sears Tower), and John Hancock Center and for his designs of structural systems that remain fundamental to all high-rise skyscrapers. Indeed, Khan is responsible for developing the algorithms that made the Hancock building and many subsequent skyscrapers possible. Another notable SOM engineer is Bill Baker, who is best known as the engineer of Burj Khalifa (Dubai, 2010), the world's tallest man-made structure. To support the tower's record heights and slim footprint, he developed the "buttressed core" structural system, consisting of a hexagonal core reinforced by three buttresses that form a Y shape.

== Notable projects ==
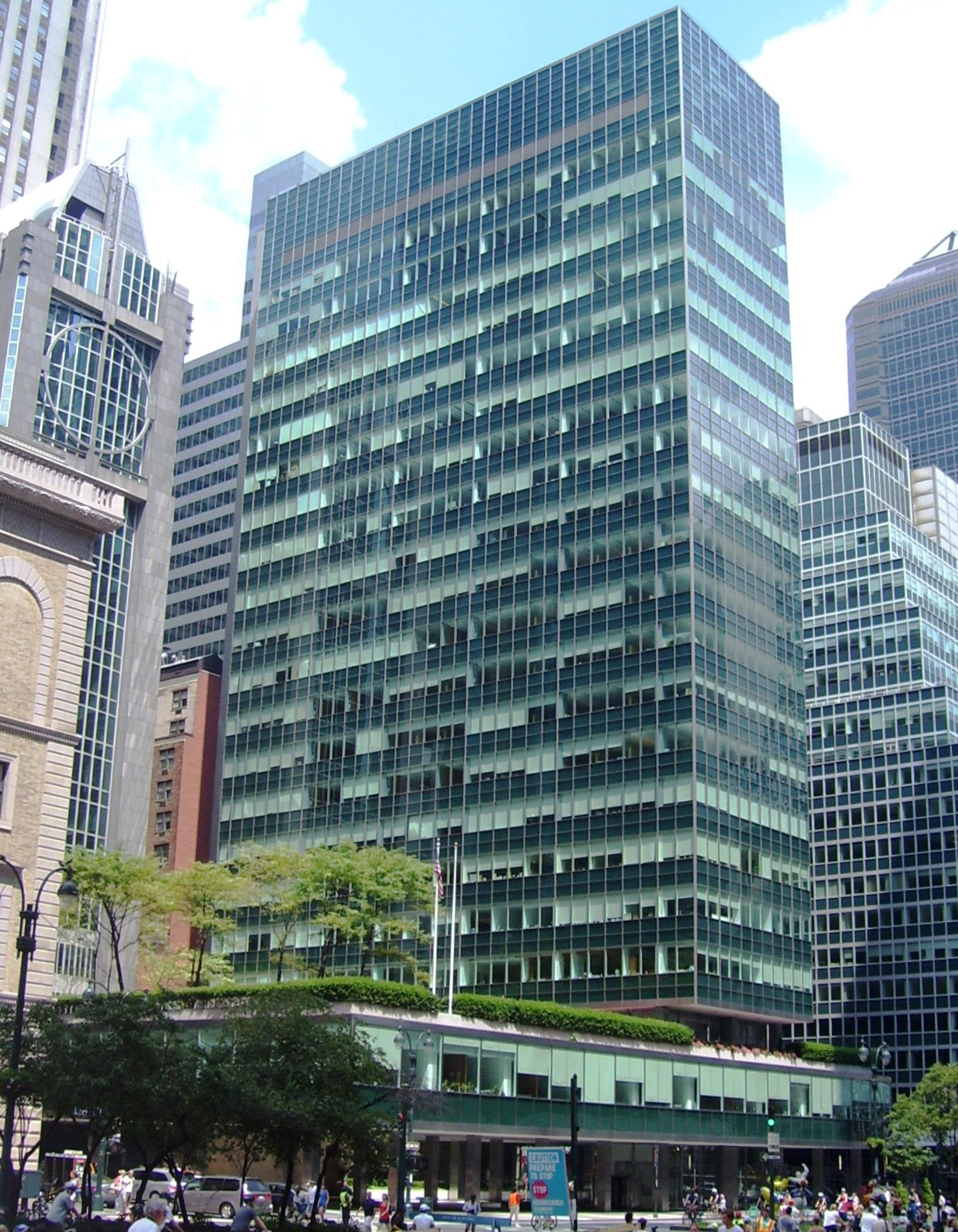
Lever House, New York City (1952)

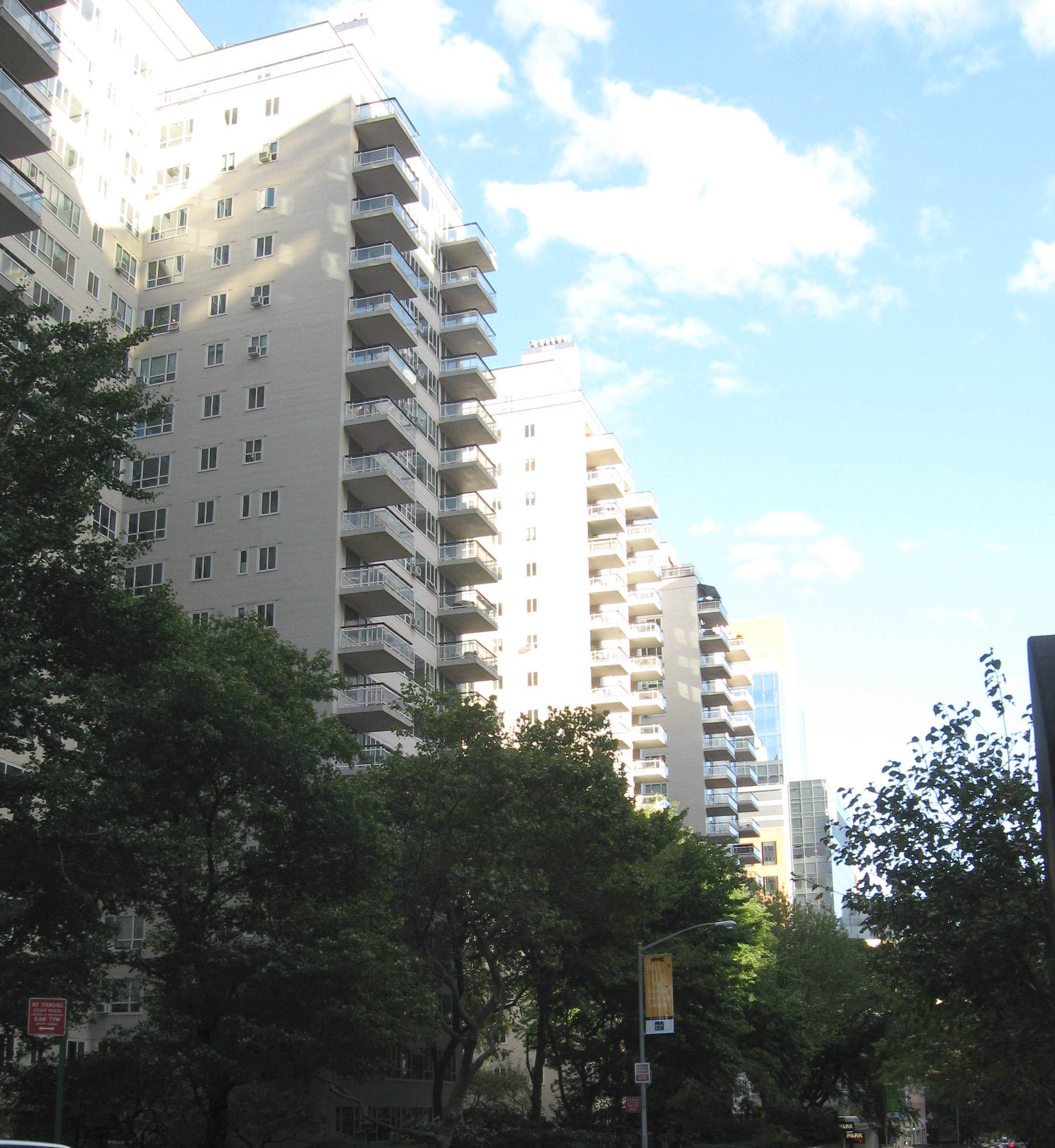
Manhattan House in New York City

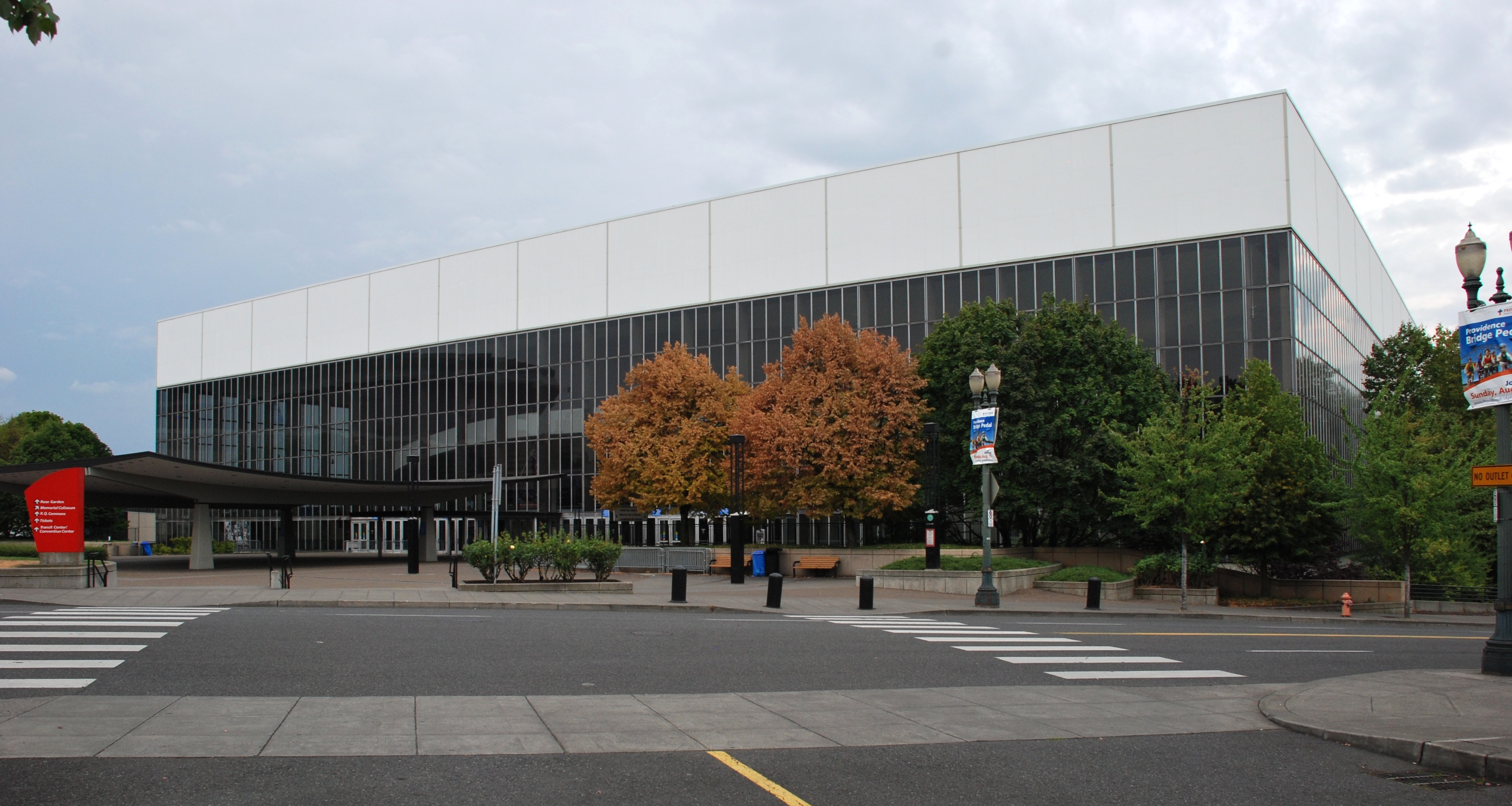
Veterans Memorial Coliseum, Portland, Oregon (1960)

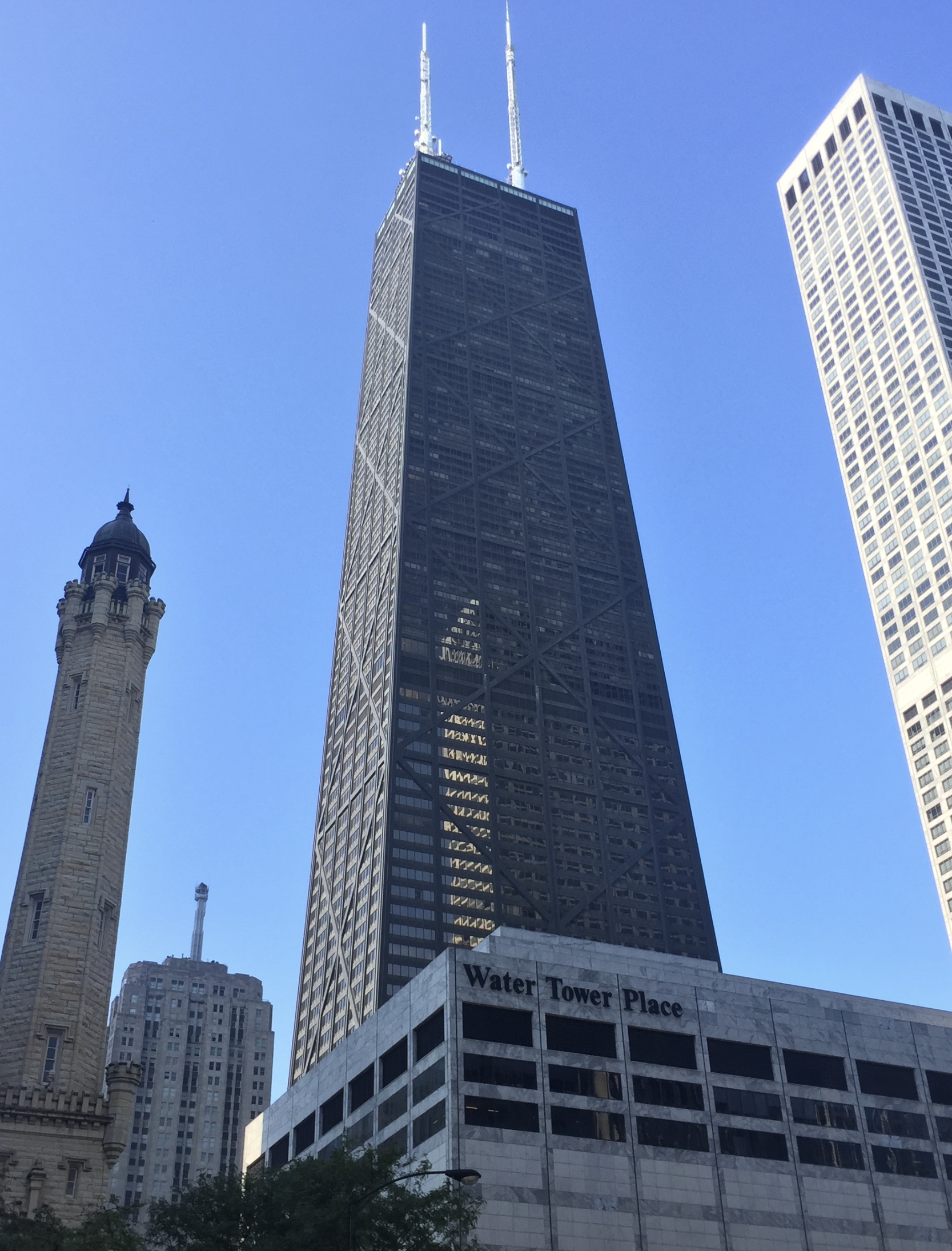
John Hancock Center, Chicago (1969)

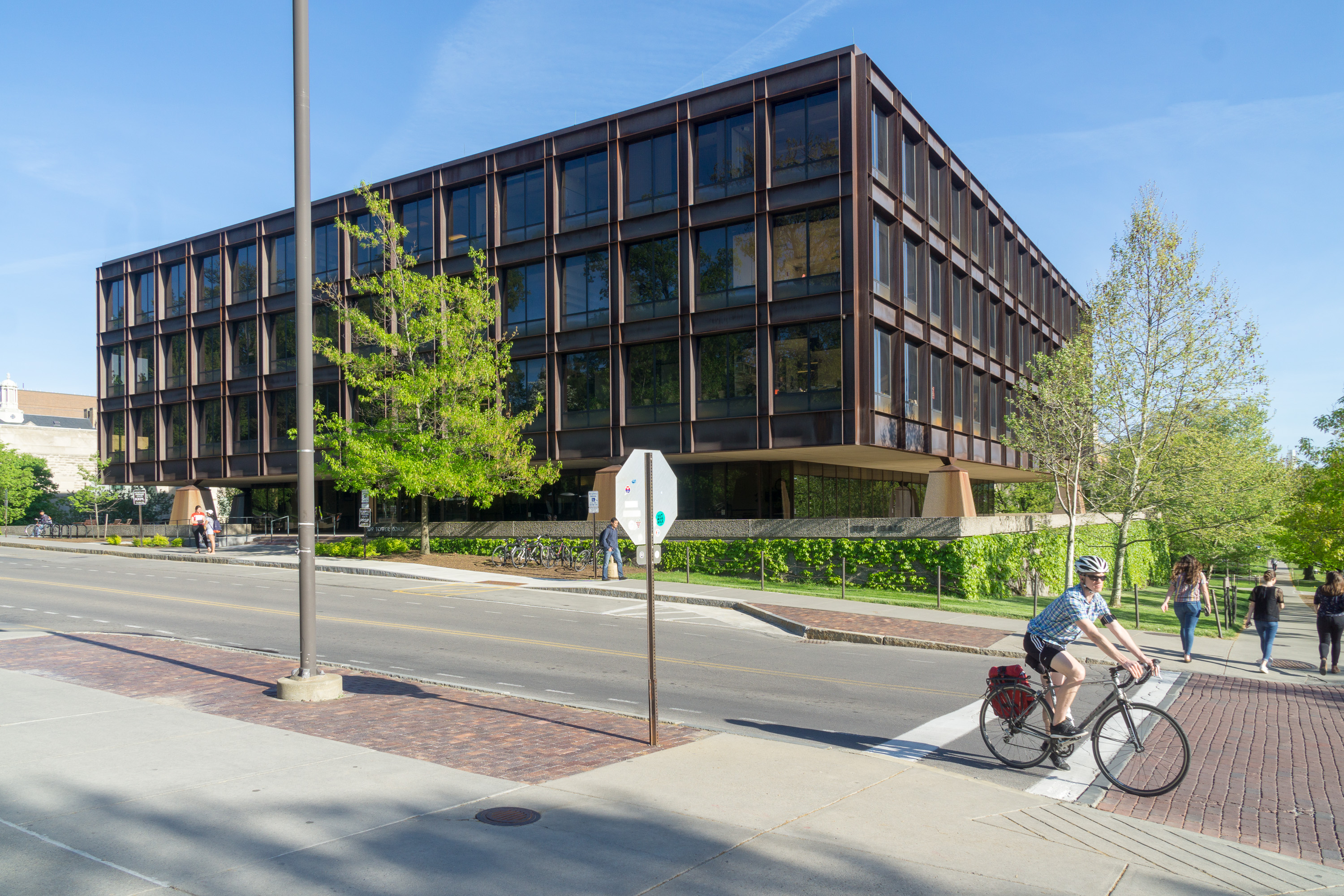
Uris Hall, Cornell University, Ithaca, New York (1972)

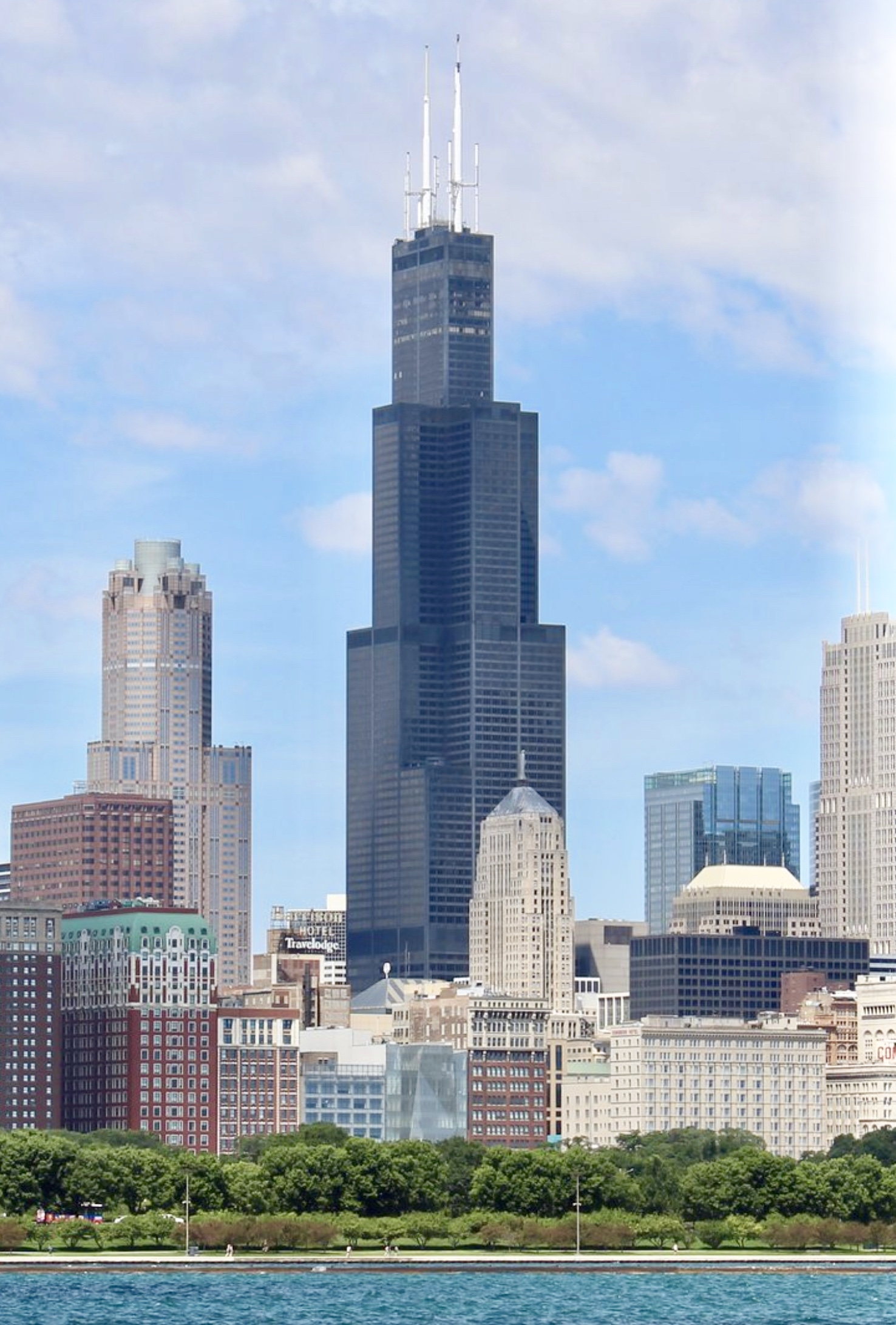
Willis Tower, Chicago (1974)

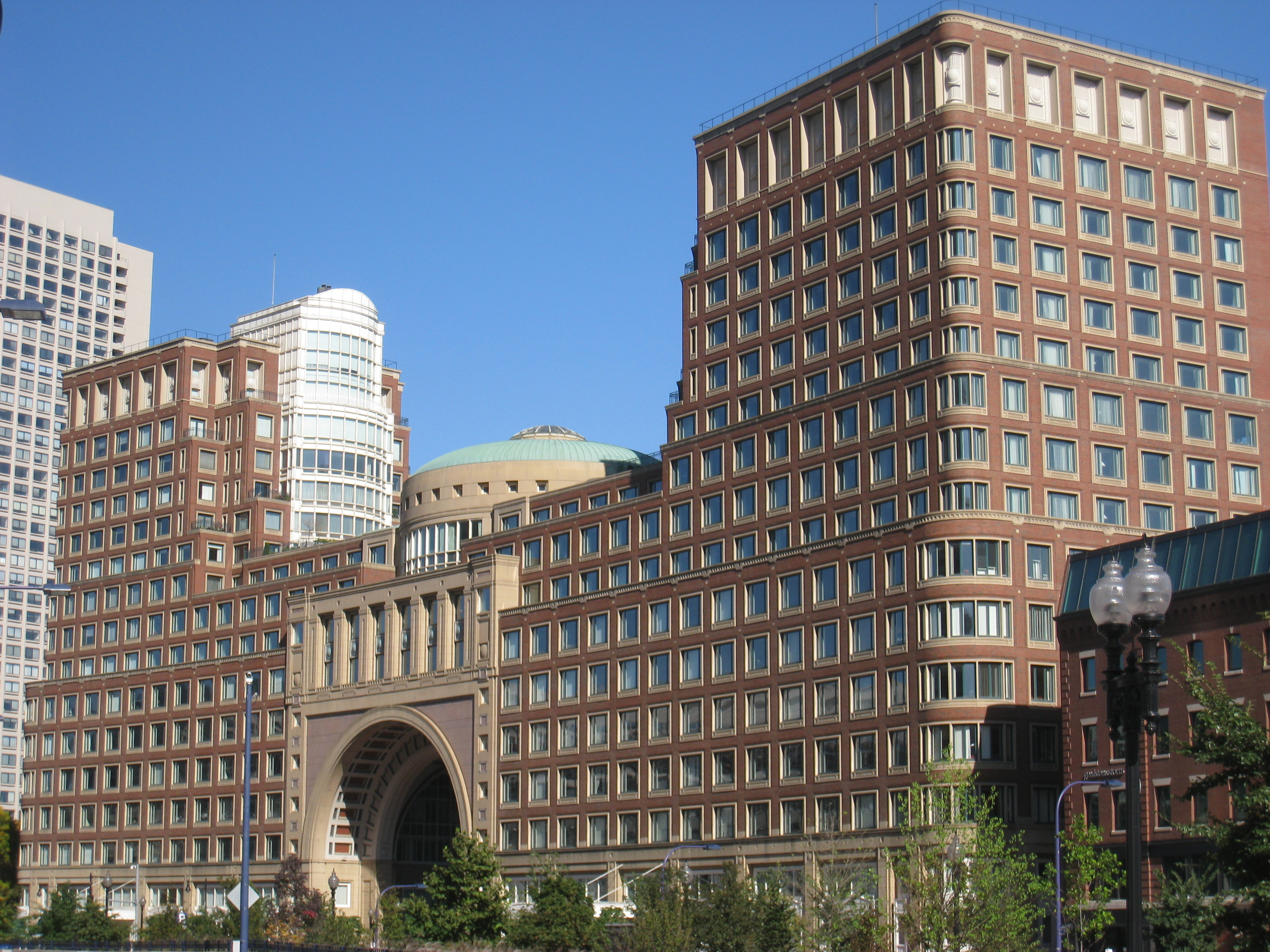
Rowes Wharf, Boston (1987)

Burj Khalifa, Dubai (2010)

- MGI Tower, Dhaka, Bangladesh (ongoing)
- Milan Olympic Village, Milan, Italy (ongoing)
- Newark Liberty International Airport, Newark, New Jersey (ongoing)
- Catalinas Rio, Buenos Aires, Argentina (ongoing) (clear 2024)
- Karlatornet, Gothenburg, Sweden (ongoing) (clear 2024)
- Greenland Shandong International Financial Center, Jinan, China (ongoing)
- Belgrade Tower, Belgrade, Serbia 2023
- Busan Lotte Town Tower, Busan, South Korea (ongoing)
- One Bangkok, Bangkok, Thailand (ongoing)
- Greenland Centre, Xi'an, China (ongoing)
- Burj Jumeirah, Dubai, United Arab Emirates (ongoing)
- Taipei Twin Towers, Taipei, Taiwan (ongoing)
- Moynihan Train Hall, New York City, 2020
- United Nations Office at Geneva, renovation, 2020
- Haeundae LCT The Sharp, Busan, South Korea, 2019
- Guoco Tower, Singapore, 2018
- The Stratford / Manhattan Loft Gardens, London, England, 2018
- Barnard College, The Milstein Center, New York City, 2018
- University of Connecticut, Innovation Partnership Building, Storrs, Connecticut, 2018
- NATO Headquarters, Brussels, Belgium, 2017
- Cornell Tech Master Plan, New York City,
- Chronicle Tower, London, 2016
- U.S. Air Force Academy, Center for Character and Leadership Development, Colorado Springs, Colorado, 2016
- Chicago Public Library, Chinatown Branch, Chicago, Illinois, 2015
- 350 Mission Street, San Francisco, 2015
- One World Trade Center, New York City, 2014
- Denver Union Station, Denver, Colorado, 2014
- Chhatrapati Shivaji Maharaj International Airport – Terminal 2, Mumbai, India, 2014
- Cayan Tower – Dubai, United Arab Emirates, 2013
- University Center, The New School, New York City, 2013
- Pearl River Tower, Guangzhou, China, 2013
- Al Hamra Tower, Kuwait City, Kuwait, 2011
- John Jay College of Criminal Justice, New York City, 2011
- Burj Khalifa, Dubai, United Arab Emirates, 2010
- Zifeng Tower, Nanjing, China, 2010
- Smithsonian National Museum of American History, Washington, D.C., 2008
- Cathedral of Christ the Light, Oakland, California, 2008
- U.S. Embassy, Beijing, China, 2008
- Toronto Pearson International Airport, Terminal 1, 2008
- Changi International Airport, Terminal 3, Changi, Singapore, 2007
- Tokyo Midtown, Tokyo, Japan, 2007
- 7 World Trade Center, New York City, 2006
- Time Warner Center, New York City, 2004
- Chongming Island Master Plan, Shanghai, China, 2004
- Greenwich Academy, Upper School, Greenwich, Connecticut, 2002
- Millennium Park Master Plan, Chicago, 2002
- 383 Madison Avenue, New York City, 2002
- Ben Gurion International Airport, Tel Aviv, Israel, 2002
- John F. Kennedy International Airport, International Arrivals Building, Terminal 4, New York City, 2001
- San Francisco International Airport, International Terminal, San Francisco, 2000
- Altice Arena (formerly Pavilhão Atlântico) Lisbon, Portugal, 1998
- Jin Mao Tower, Shanghai, 1998
- Matitone, Genoa, Italy, 1992
- 1540 Broadway, New York City, 1990
- One Worldwide Plaza, New York City, 1989
- Rowes Wharf, Boston, Massachusetts, 1986
- National Mall Redevelopment, Washington, D.C., 1986
- 63 Building, Seoul, South Korea, 1985
- Northeast Corridor Improvement Project, 1985
- Demonet Building, Washington, D.C., 1984
- Hubert H. Humphrey Metrodome, Minneapolis, Minnesota, 1982
- Hajj Terminal, King Abdul Aziz International Airport, Jeddah, Saudi Arabia, 1981
- Marriott World Trade Center, New York City, 1981 [Destroyed in 2001]
- U.S. Bank Plaza, Minneapolis, Minnesota, 1981
- PNC Center (Cleveland), Cleveland, 1980
- Louise M. Davies Symphony Hall, San Francisco, 1980
- First Canadian Centre, Calgary, Alberta, 1979
- Texaco Headquarters, White Plains, New York, 1977
- Azadi Stadium, Tehran, 1974
- Willis Tower (formerly Sears Tower), Chicago, 1974
- One Shell Plaza, Houston, Texas, 1972
- Seneca One Tower, Buffalo, New York, 1972
- One Shell Square, New Orleans, Louisiana, 1972
- Boise Cascade Corporation Headquarters, Boise, Idaho, 1971.
- Weyerhaeuser Corporate Headquarters, Federal Way, Washington, 1971
- Republic Newspaper Office and Printing Plant, Columbus, Indiana, 1971
- John Hancock Center, Chicago, 1970
- 140 Broadway, New York City, 1967
- Oakland Arena, Oakland, California, 1966
- Oakland-Alameda County Coliseum, Oakland, California, 1966
- Banque Lambert, Brussels, Belgium, 1964
- Cook County Administration Building (formerly the Brunswick Building), Chicago, 1964
- Beinecke Rare Book and Manuscript Library, Yale University, New Haven, Connecticut, 1963
- Albright-Knox Art Gallery, Extension, Buffalo, New York, 1962
- United States Air Force Academy, Colorado Springs, Colorado, 1962
- 28 Liberty Street (Chase Manhattan Bank Building), New York City, 1961
- Veterans Memorial Coliseum, Portland, Oregon, 1960
- Union Carbide Building, New York City, 1954
- 500 Park Avenue (Pepsi-Cola Corporation World Headquarters), New York City, 1960
- Inland Steel Building, Chicago, 1958
- Connecticut General Life Insurance Company, Bloomfield, Connecticut, 1957
- Manufacturers Trust Company Building, New York City, 1954
- Naval Station Great Lakes, Chicago, 1954
- Lever House, New York City, 1952
- Manhattan House, New York City, 1951
- Oak Ridge New Town Master Plan, Oak Ridge, Tennessee, 1949
- Terrace Plaza Hotel, Cincinnati, Ohio, 1948

== See also ==
- SOM Foundation
