= World Trade Center Genoa =

Skyscraper in Genoa, Italy

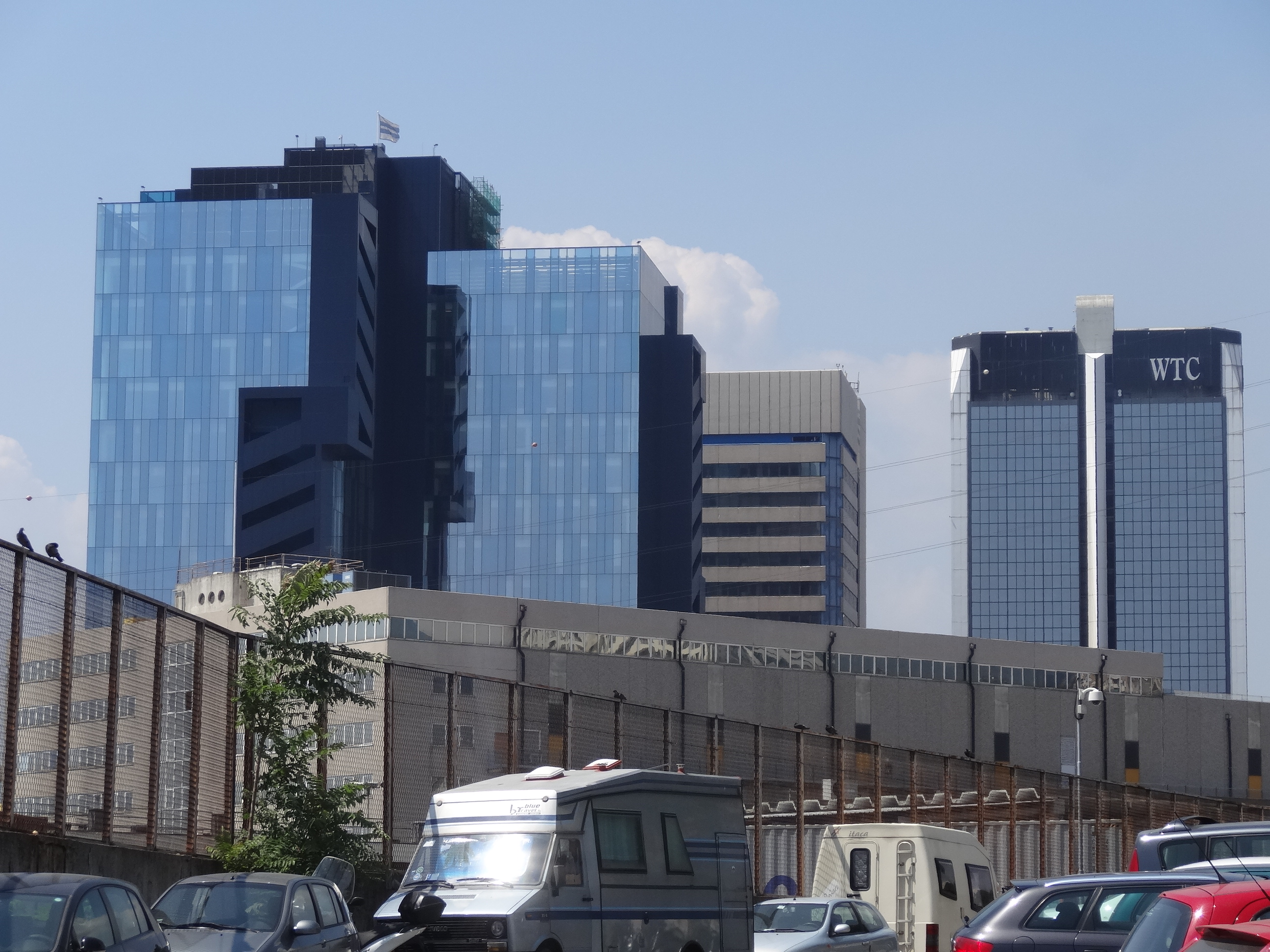
- The World Trade Center Genoa in 2016
- Interactive map of the World Trade Center Genoa area

General information
- Location: Genoa, Italy
- Coordinates: 44°24′29.22″N 8°54′02.86″E

Height
- Roof: 102 m (335 ft)

The World Trade Center Genoa is an office skyscraper located in Genoa, Italy.

== History ==
Construction work of the building, designed by Piero Gambacciani e Associati, began in 1990 and was completed in 1992. It is one of the WTC locations in Italy and it houses the special agency of the Chamber of Commerce dedicated to promoting the international development of Genoese businesses.

== Description ==
Located in the San Benigno business district, the building is 102 metres (335 ft) tall and has 25 floors, which make it the 4th-tallest in Genoa.
