= John O. Merrill =

American architect and structural engineer

- Born: August 10, 1896; Saint Paul, Minnesota, U.S.
- Died: June 13, 1975 (aged 78); Colorado Springs, Colorado, U.S.
- Occupation: Architect
- Awards: 1950 Fellow of the American Institute of Architects (FAIA)
- Practice: Skidmore, Owings and Merrill

John Ogden Merrill FAIA (10 August 1896 – 13 June 1975) was an American architect and structural engineer. He was chiefly responsible for the design and construction of the United States Air Force Academy campus and for the development of Oak Ridge, Tennessee where the atomic bomb was developed. He was a partner of the international architectural firm of Skidmore, Owings & Merrill.

== Early life ==
Merrill was born in St. Paul, Minnesota. He studied at the University of Wisconsin from 1915 through 1917. His education was interrupted by his war time service in the military. During World War I, he served as a captain in the coastal artillery. When released from the military in 1919, he continued his education. The Massachusetts Institute of Technology awarded him a degree in architecture in 1921.

== Career ==
The Chicago architectural firm of Granger and Bollenbacher gave Merrill his first opportunity to practice architecture, and by 1939, Merrill had become the chief architect for the Midwest States for the Federal Housing Administration.

=== Skidmore, Owings and Merrill ===
Merril joined Skidmore, Owings and Merrill (SOM) in 1939. He is credited with establishing the multi-disciplinary nature of the firm, and the innovative character of SOM’s organization and culture was influenced at an early stage by Merrill and other architectural engineers who later became partners in the practice. SOM defined a new architectural approach of teamwork and total or comprehensive design.

The firm undertook the coordination of every aspect of a specific project – design, engineering, landscaping, urban planning and interiors. Major military projects with which Merrill was associated include:

- Oak Ridge – Merrill was in charge of developing the secret research campus at Oak Ridge, Tennessee. He directed the creation of the secret town which evolved along with the Manhattan Project.
- Okinawa military facilities – Merrill served in the US Army Corps of Engineers between 1942 and 1946. He directed the development of the permanent US military facilities on Okinawa, including Kadena Air Base.
- United States Air Force Academy – Merrill moved between Chicago and the Colorado Springs field office to oversee the construction of the new Air Force campus Merrill was the working administrative partner on the job. He was also a project spokesman for the project. At one point, Merrill announced that planning proposals for the new campus had abandoned what was perceived as a "radical" chapel design; however, the accordion-like structure is today acknowledged as an iconic symbol.

Merrill's death in Colorado Springs, Colorado was reported in the New York Times on June 13, 1975.

== Community leadership ==
Merrill was a fellow of the American Institute of Architects (AIA); In 1937, he was president of the Chicago Chapter of the AIA. In 1950, Merrill was appointed as a member of the Board of Consultants to the New York State Building Code Commission; and he directed revision of the Chicago Building Code in 1947–1949.

Among Merrill's interests outside his profession was his support for Friends of the Earth. In 1969, he lent his name to a campaign to encourage men and women to pledge that they would not buy fur coats or any other articles made from skins of wild animals.

== Honors ==
- Fellow of the American Institute of Architects (FAIA), 1950.

== Select works ==
Merrill's published writings are few.

- 1921: Design and Comparative Costs of Various Concrete Floor Systems (with R.A. Eckles). Thesis (B.S.)--Massachusetts Institute of Technology, Department of Architectural Engineering. OCLC 37815235
- 1962: Archiektur von Skidmore, Owings & Merrill, 1950–1962 (with Louis Skidmore, Ernst Danz, Ernst van Haagen and Nathaniel Owings).Stuttgart: Hatje.OCLC 164879857
