= Francesco Peverelli =

Italian architect

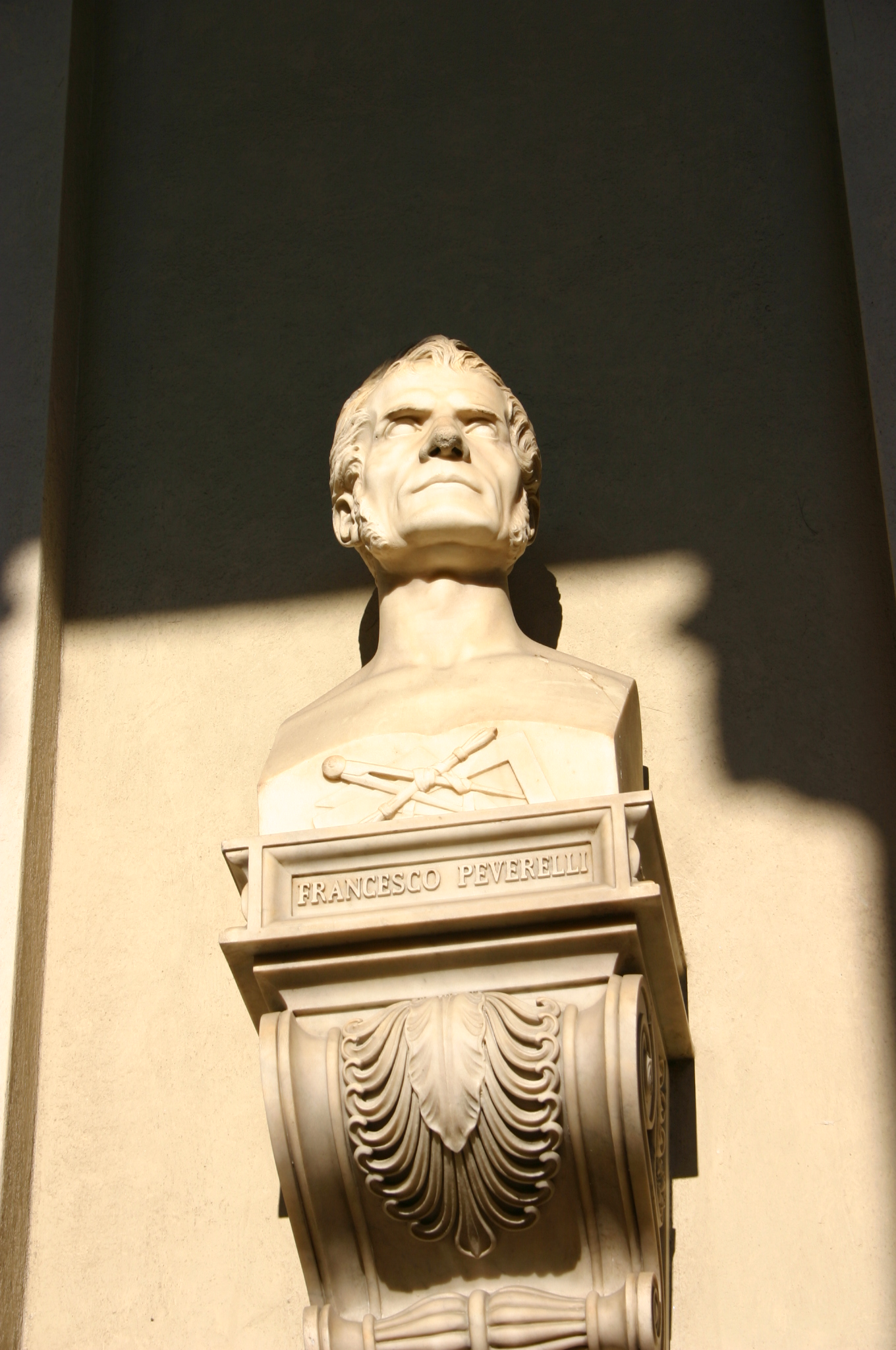
Bust of Peverelli, Brera Gallery, Milan

Francesco Peverelli (1789–1854) was an Italian architect, active in Lombardy in a Neoclassical style.

He was a pupil of Luigi Cagnola, and helped complete, with Francesco Londonio the Younger, the Arco della Pace in Milan, after Cagnola's death in 1833. He also completed Cagnola's eclectic house: Villa La Rotonda.
