= Porta Sempione =

- City Gate
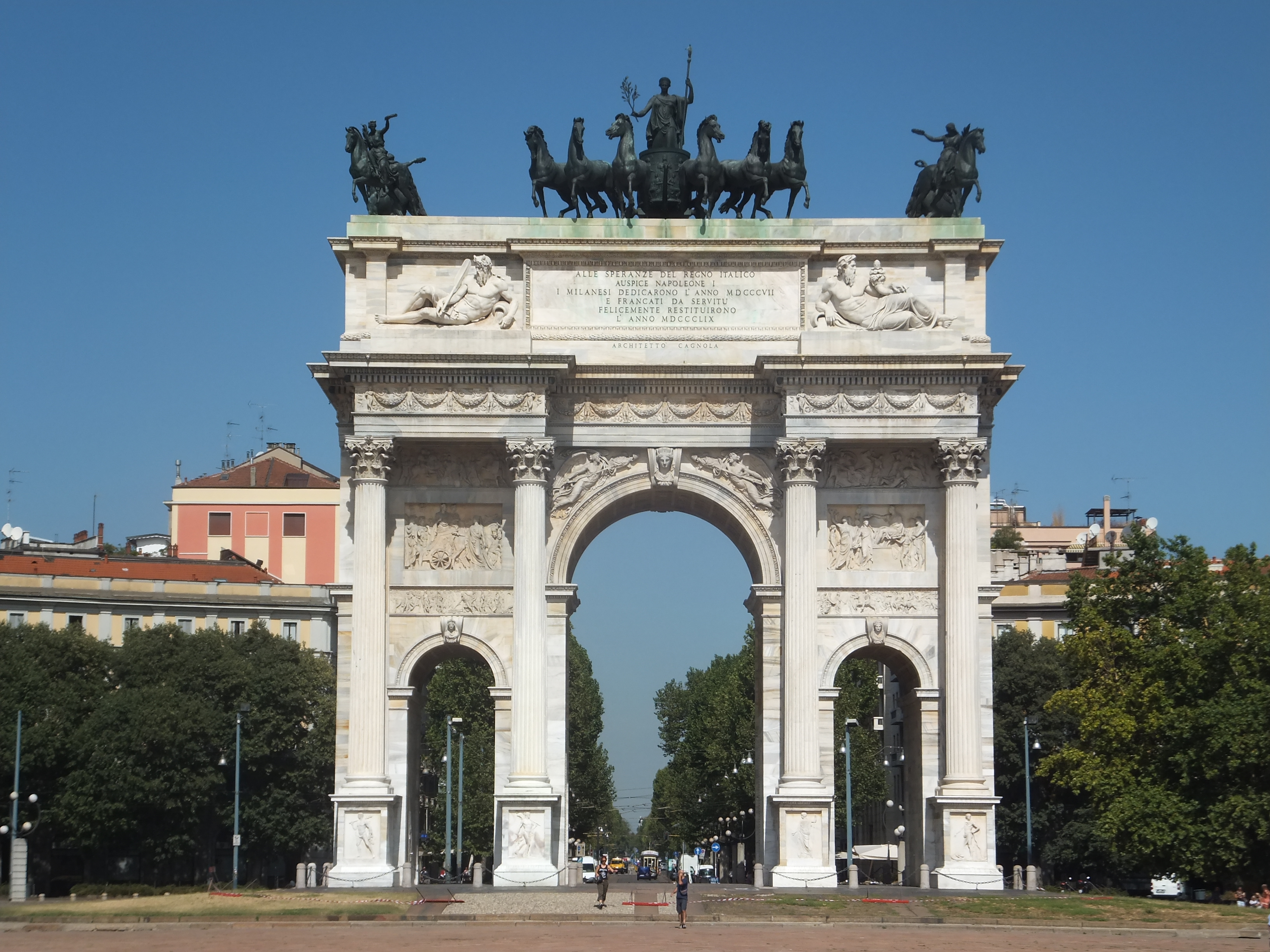
- Interactive map of Porta Sempione
- Coordinates: 45°28′33″N 9°10′21″E
- Country: Italy
- Region: Lombardy
- Province: Milan
- Comune: Milan
- Zone: 1
- Time zone: UTC+1 (CET)
  - Summer (DST): UTC+2 (CEST)

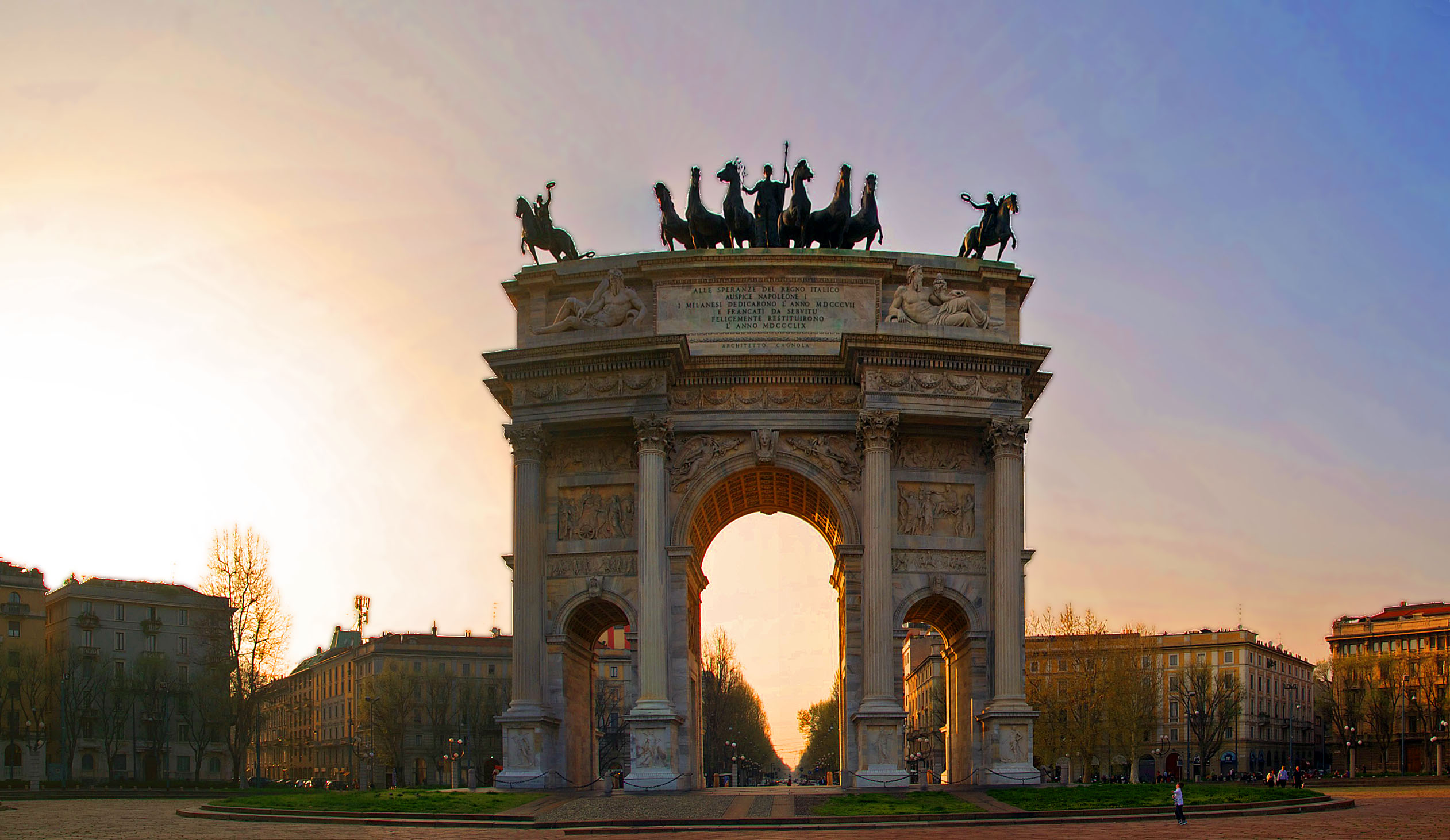
The Arch of Peace at sunset

Porta Sempione ("Simplon Gate") is a city gate of Milan, Italy. The name is used both to refer to the gate proper and to the surrounding district (quartiere), a part of the Zone 1 division (the historic city centre), including the major avenue of Corso Sempione. (Note: Note that, since Sempione is also the name of the long avenue leading up to the gate, other areas of Milan are sometimes referred to with names including the word Sempione, yet they are not necessarily in the surroundings of Porta Sempione; for example, the district around the Garegnano Charterhouse is sometimes referred to as Certosa/Sempione.) The gate is marked by a landmark triumphal arch called Arco della Pace ("Arch of Peace"), dating back to the 19th century, although its origins can be traced back to a gate of the Roman walls of Milan.

== The gate ==
=== History ===
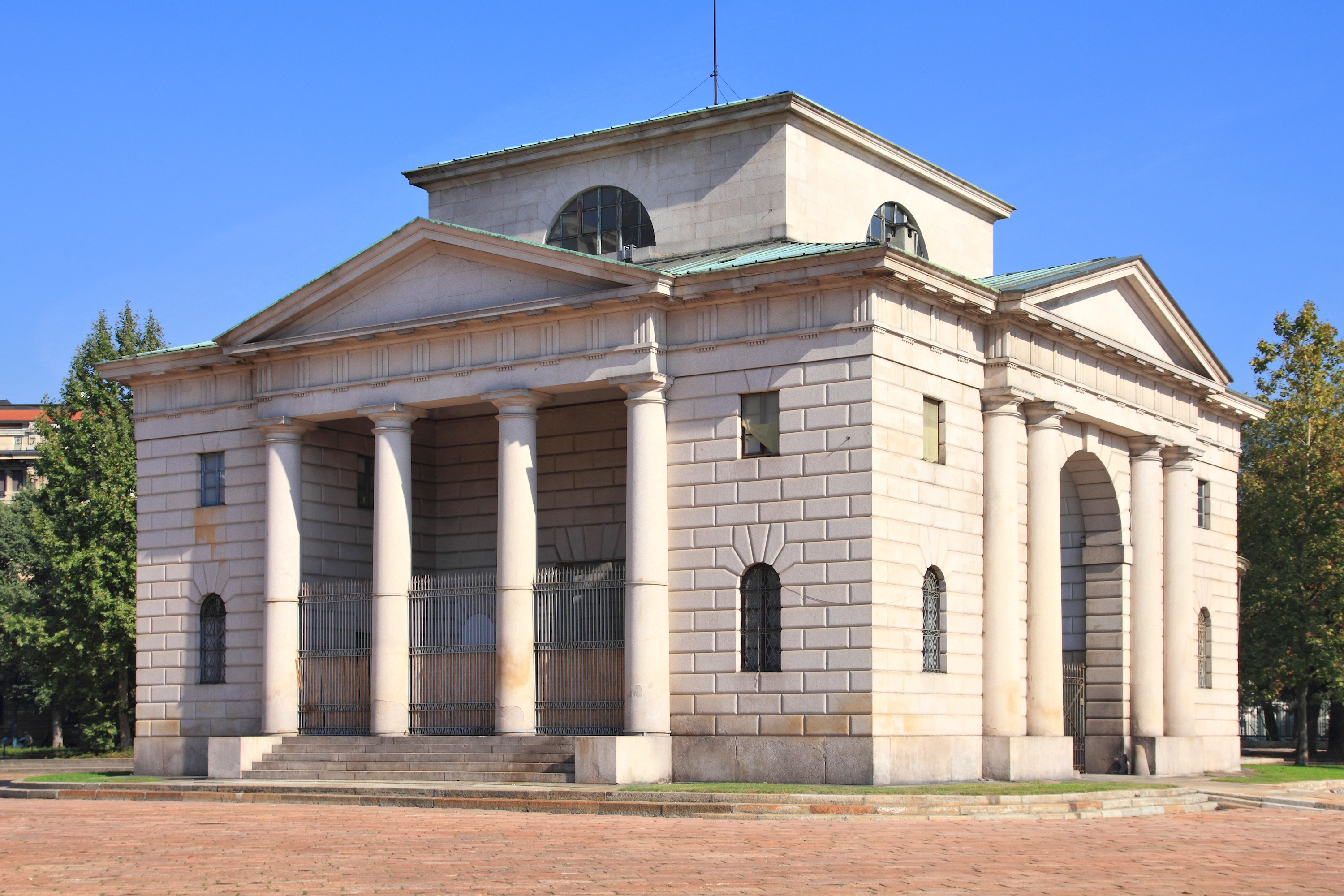
Former toll house of Porta Sempione

A gate that roughly corresponds to modern Porta Sempione was already part of Roman walls of Milan. It was called Porta Giovia ("Jupiter's Gate") and was located at the end of modern Via San Giovanni sul Muro. At the time, the gate was meant to control an important road leading to what is now Castelseprio. Very little remains of the original Roman structure; some Roman tombstones that used to be placed by the outer side of the walls have been employed in the construction of later buildings such as the Basilica of Saint Simplician (located in Corso Garibaldi).

In the Middle Ages, part of the Roman walls in the Porta Sempione area was adapted as part of the new walls. The gate itself was moved north, in a place that is now occupied by the Sforza Castle. The Castle itself was completed in the 15th Century, under Duke Filippo Maria Visconti, and the gate itself became part of the Castle.

In 1807, under the Napoleonic rule, the Arch of Peace was built by architect Luigi Cagnola. This new gate marked the place where the new Strada del Sempione entered Milan. This road, which is still in use today, connects Milan to Paris through the Simplon Pass crossing the Alps. At the time, the gate was still called Porta Giovia. When the Napoleonic Kingdom of Italy fell and Milan was conquered by the Austrian Empire, the gate was not yet completed, and the construction was abandoned for a while.

The construction of the Arch was resumed, again by Cagnola, in 1826, for Emperor Francis II, who dedicated the monument to the 1815 Congress of Vienna. When Cagnola died in 1833, his project was taken over by Francesco Londonio and Francesco Peverelli, who brought it to completion in 1838.

The gate was the scene of several prominent events in the Milanese history of the 19th century. On 22 March 1848, the Austrian army led by marshal Josef Radetzky escaped from Milan through Porta Giovia after being defeated in the Five Days of Milan rebellion. On 8 June 1859, four days after the Battle of Magenta, Napoleon III and Victor Emmanuel II of Italy triumphally entered Milan through the gate. The Italian quote written above the arch, translated by Google Translate to English reads, "To the hopes of the Italian kingdom auspice Napoleon 1 the Milanese dedicated the year MDCCCVII and freed from servitude they happily returned the year MDCCCLIX.".

=== Site and decoration ===
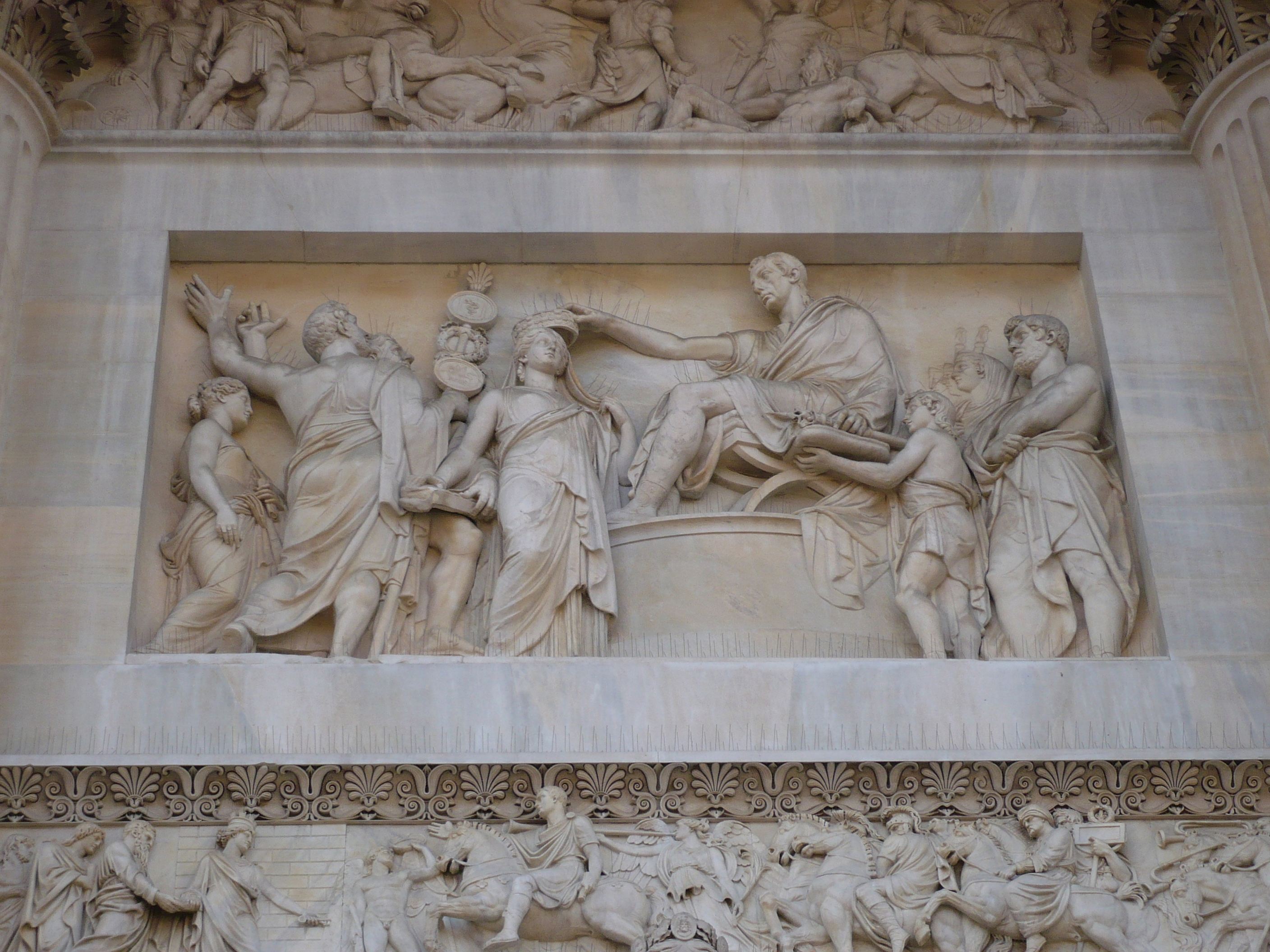
The Foundation of the Kingdom of Lombardy–Venetia, bas-relief by Pompeo Marchesi, on the right-hand side of the Arch of Peace

The gate is located at the center of a wide round square known as Piazza Sempione ("Simplon Square"). It is adjacent to Simplon Park, the main city park of Milan, which was designed with the explicit intent of providing panoramic views encompassing both the Arch and the nearby Sforza Castle.

The gate is a neoclassical triumphal arch, 25 m high and 24 m wide, decorated with a number of bas-reliefs, statues, and corinthian columns. Bas-reliefs and statues are made of a variety of materials, including marble, bronze, wood, and stucco. Many of such decorations, especially bas-reliefs, are dedicated to major events in the history of Italy and Europe, such as the Battle of Leipzig, the foundation of the Kingdom of Lombardy–Venetia, the Congress of Vienna. Other decorations have classical mythology subjects such as Mars, Ceres, Minerva, Apollo, and Victoria-Nike. There are also a group of statues that are allegories of major rivers in North Italy such as the Po, the Adige and the Ticino. Notable artists that have collaborated to the decoration of the gate include Pompeo Marchesi, Luigi Acquisti, Grazioso Rusca, Luigi Buzzi Leone, Giovanni Battista Comolli, Luigi Marchesi, Nicola Pirovano, Francesco Peverelli, Benedetto Cacciatori, Giovanni Antonio Labus, Claudio Monti, Gaetano Monti, Camillo Pacetti, Antonio Pasquali, Giovambattista Perabò, Angelo Pizzi, Grazioso Rusca, Girolamo Rusca, and Francesco Somaini.

At the sides of the Arch of Peace there are two minor rectangular buildings that used to be the customs office.

== Bas-reliefs of the Arch ==
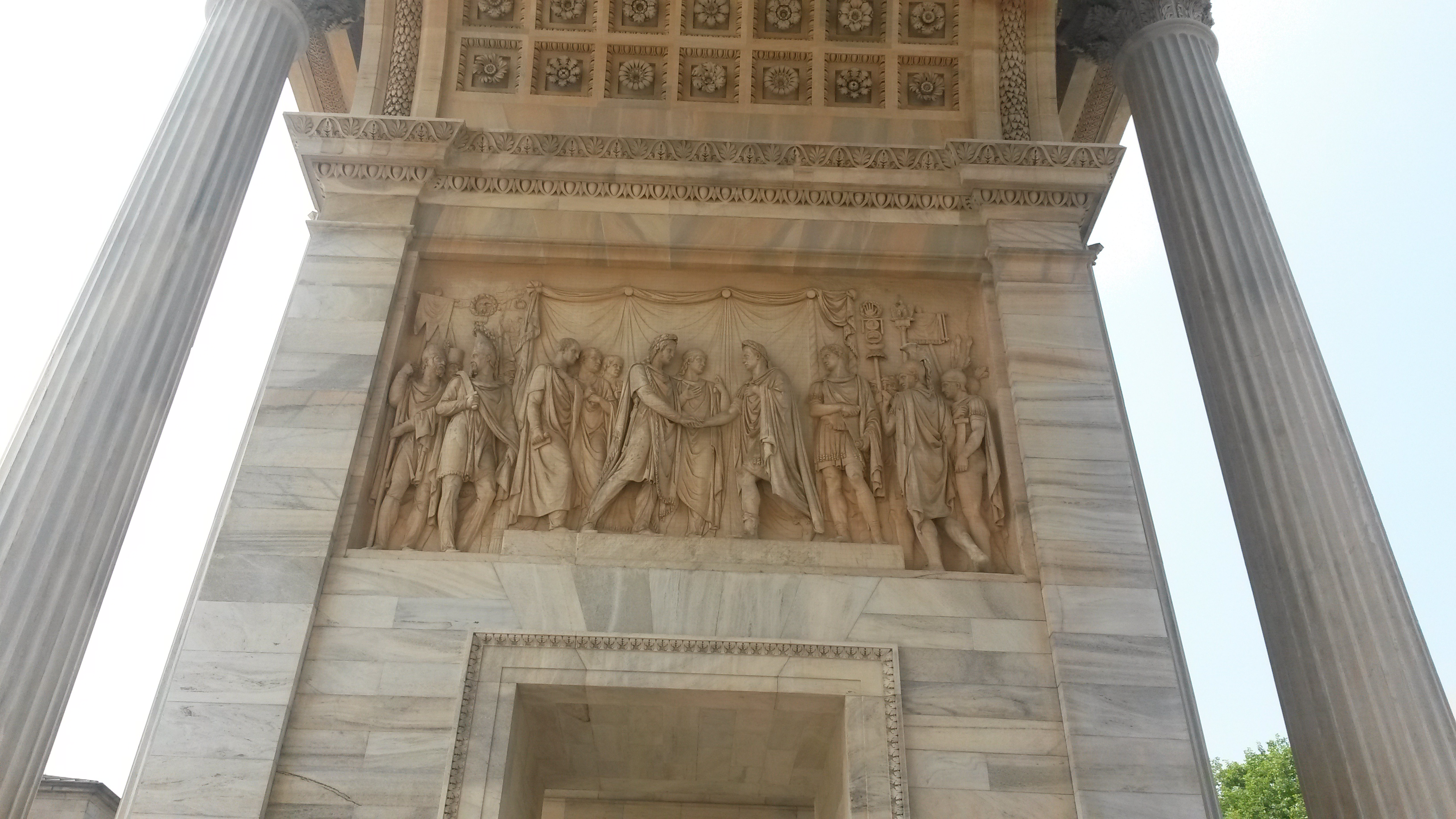
Congress of Prague, internal bas-relief

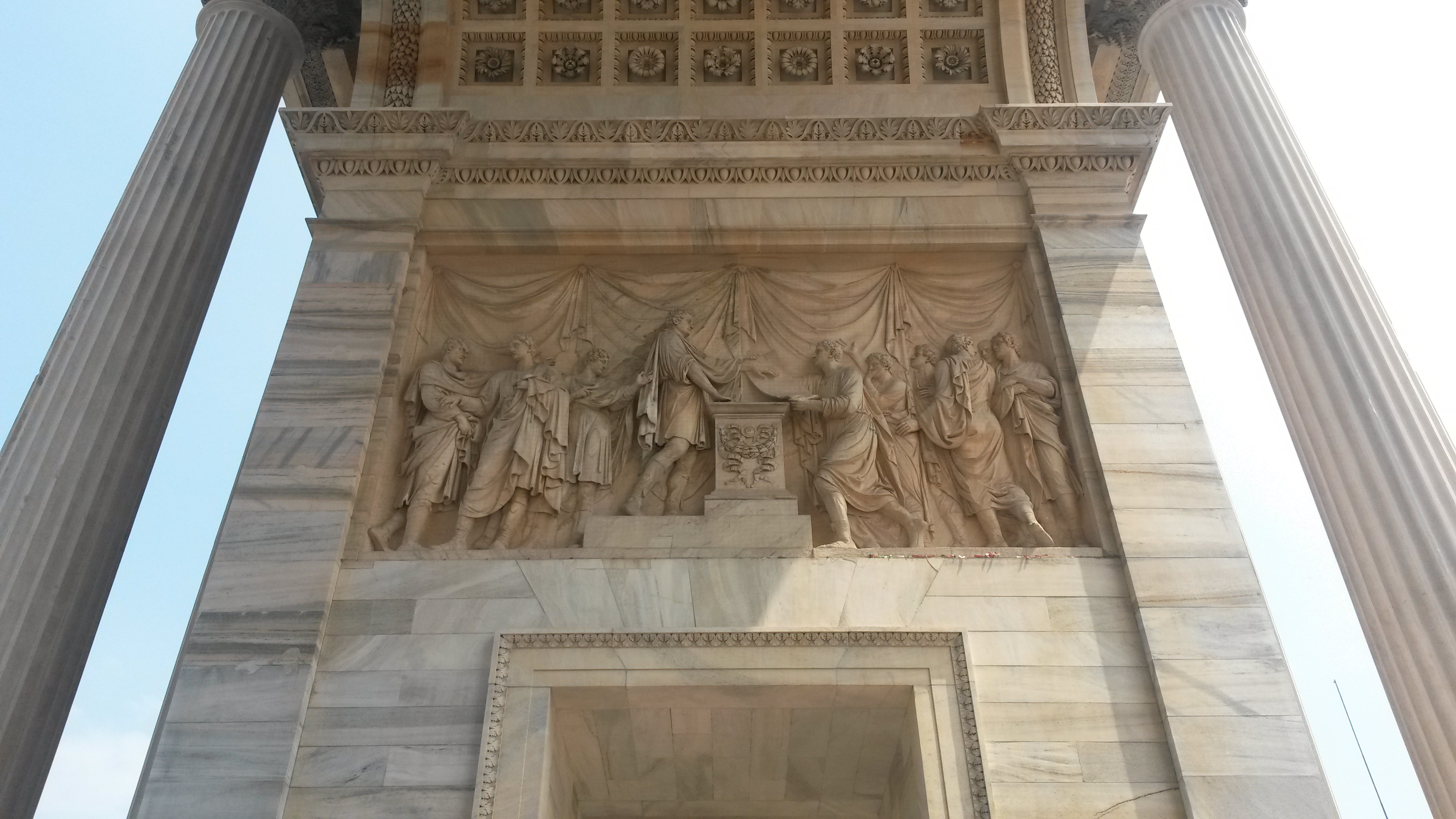
internal bas-relief

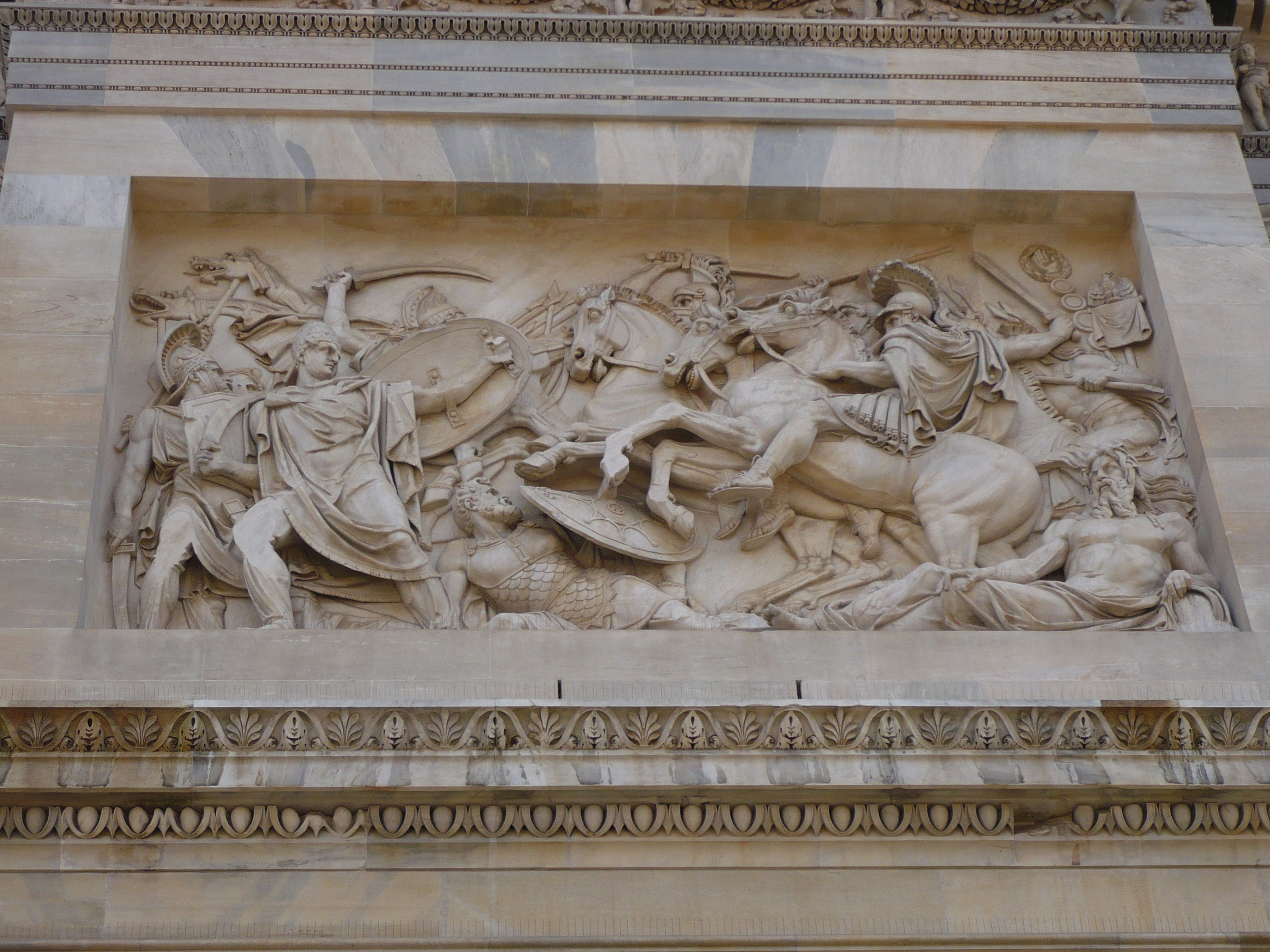
bas-relief

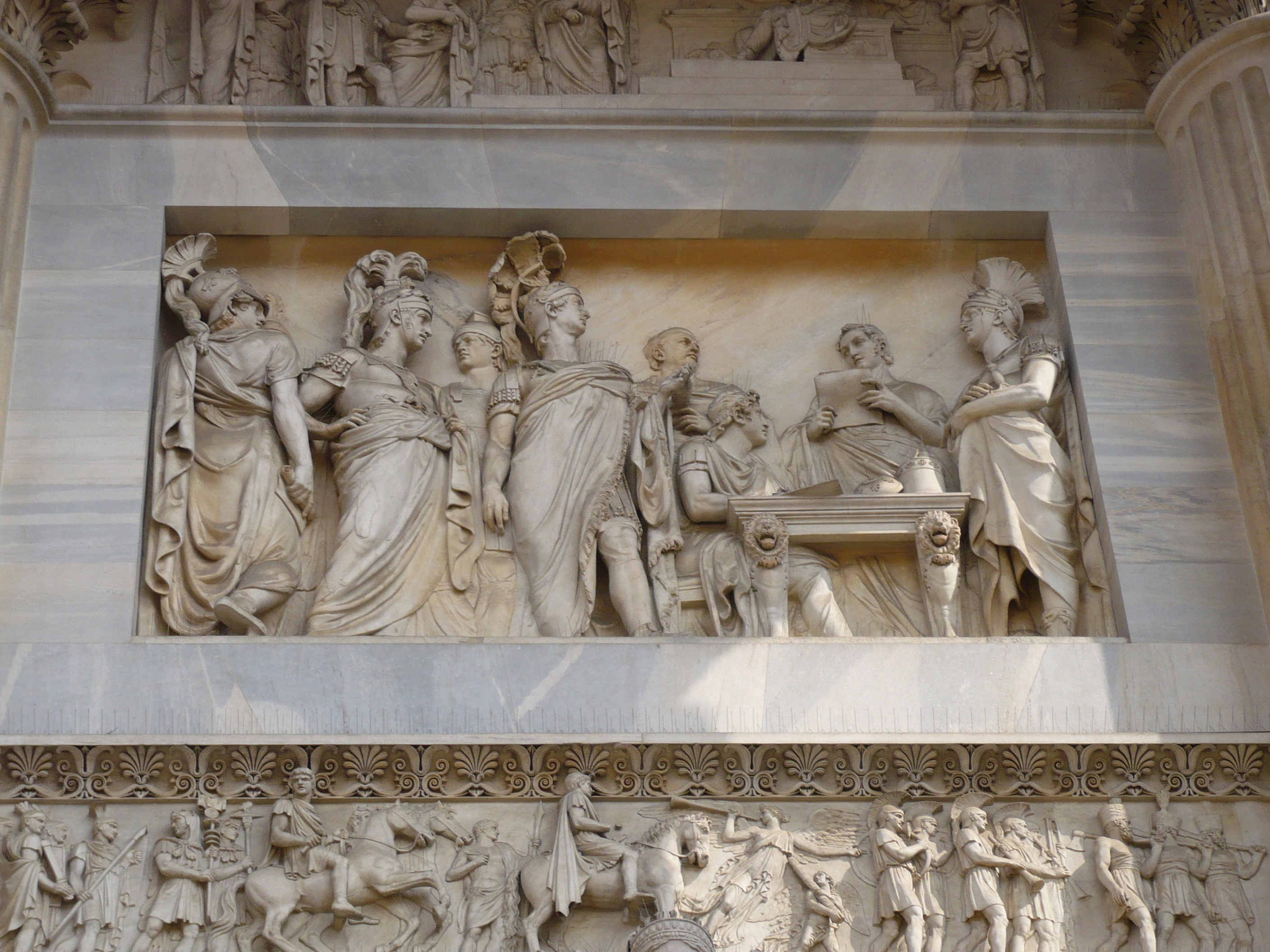
bas-relief

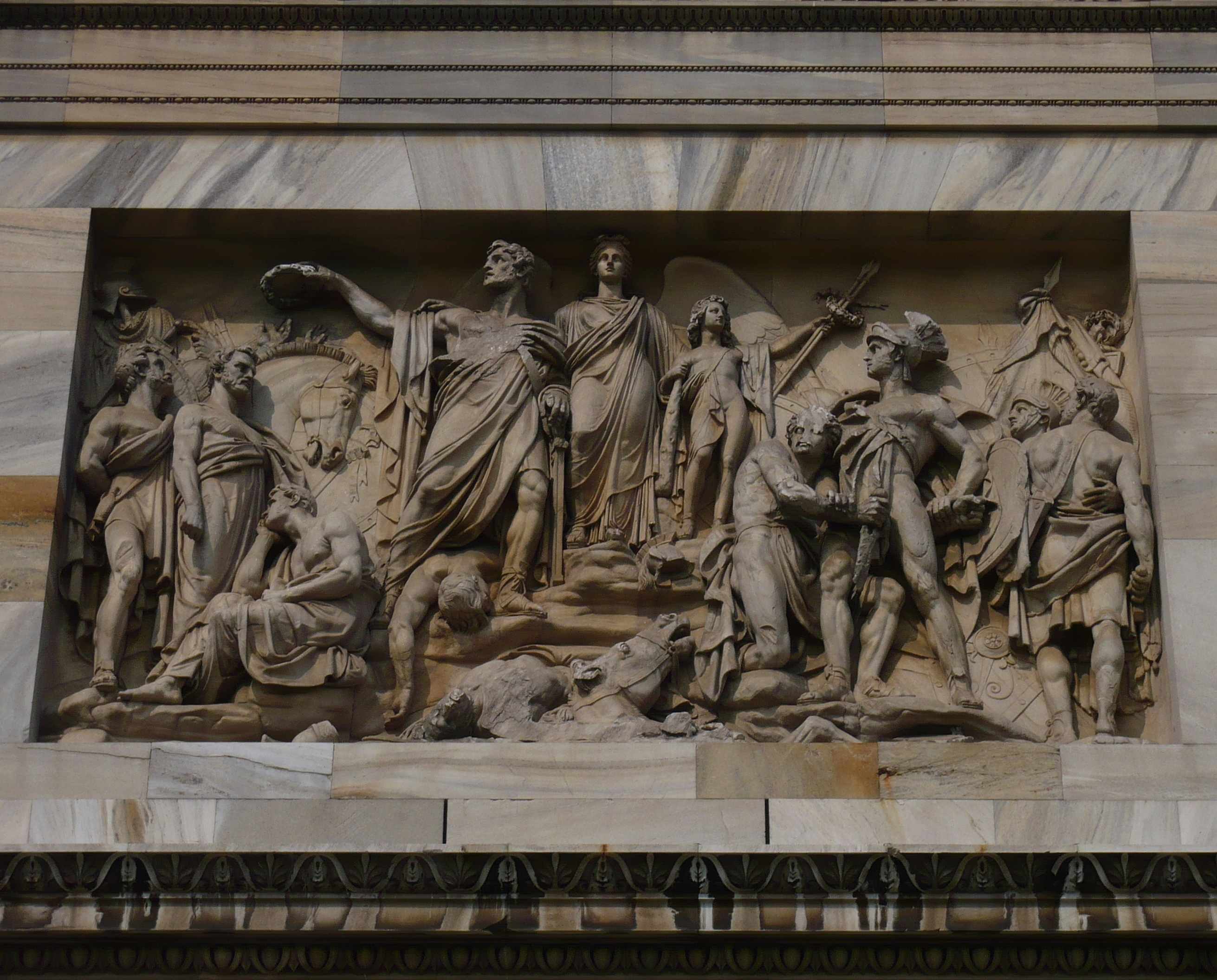
bas-relief

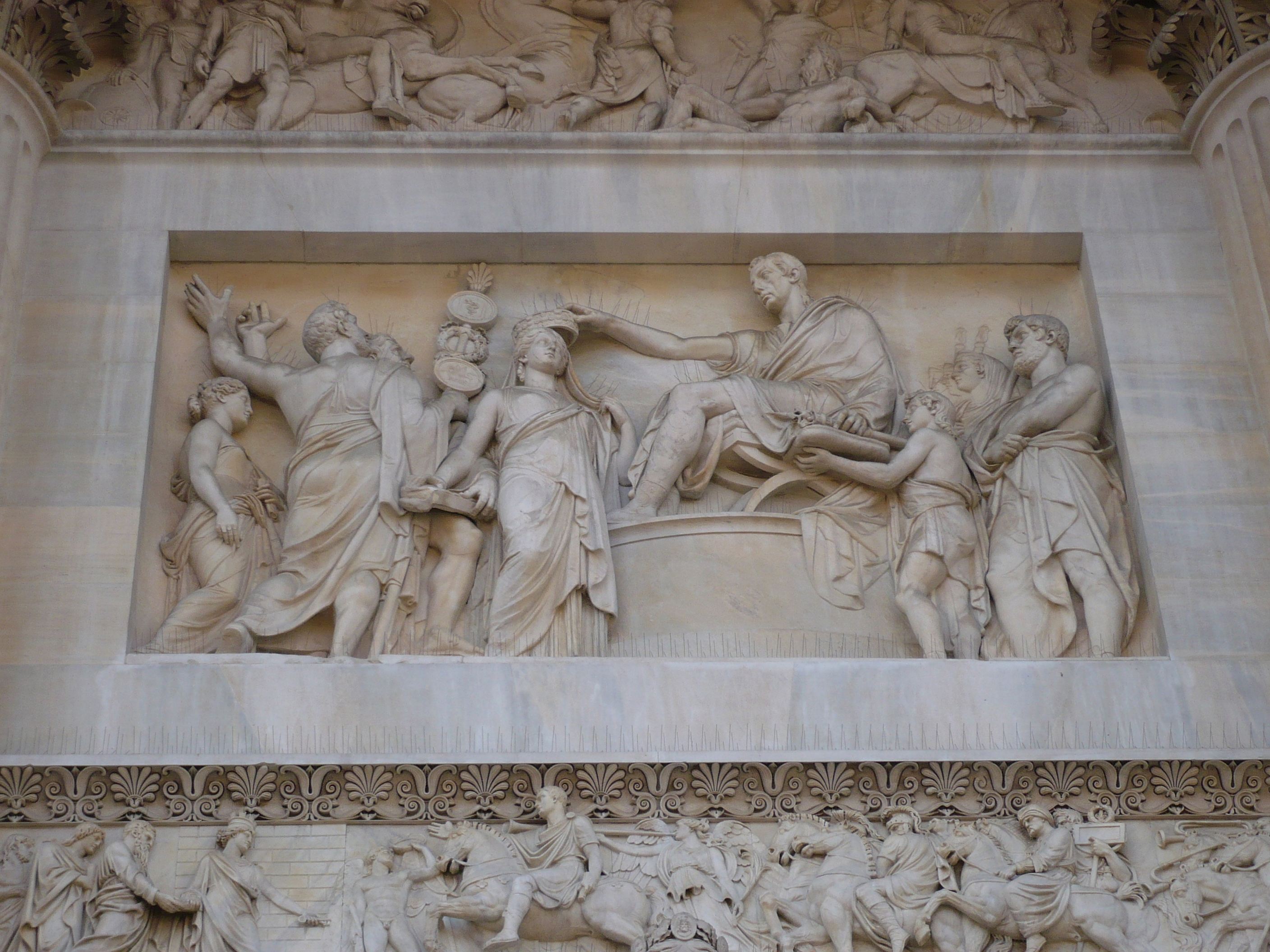
Foundation of the Kingdom of Lombardy-Venetia, by Pompeo Marchesi, on the right of the Arch of Peace

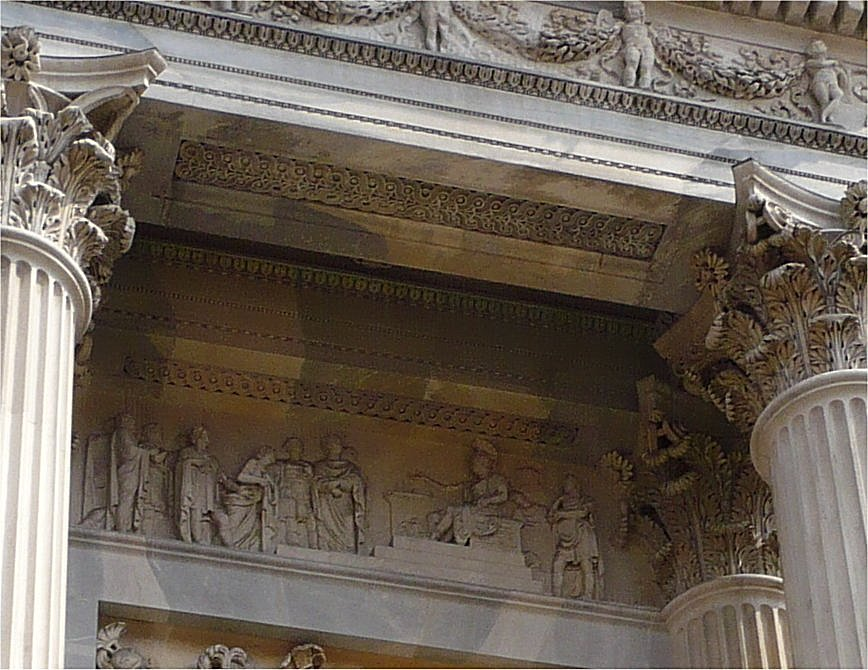
Institution of the Iron Crown by Giovanni Battista Perabò

=== References in popular culture ===
In his novella A Moveable Feast, Ernest Hemingway mentions the Arch of Peace, expressing the belief that its orientation be parallel to those of the Arc de Triomphe du Carrousel and the Arc de Triomphe de l'Étoile in Paris.

== The district ==
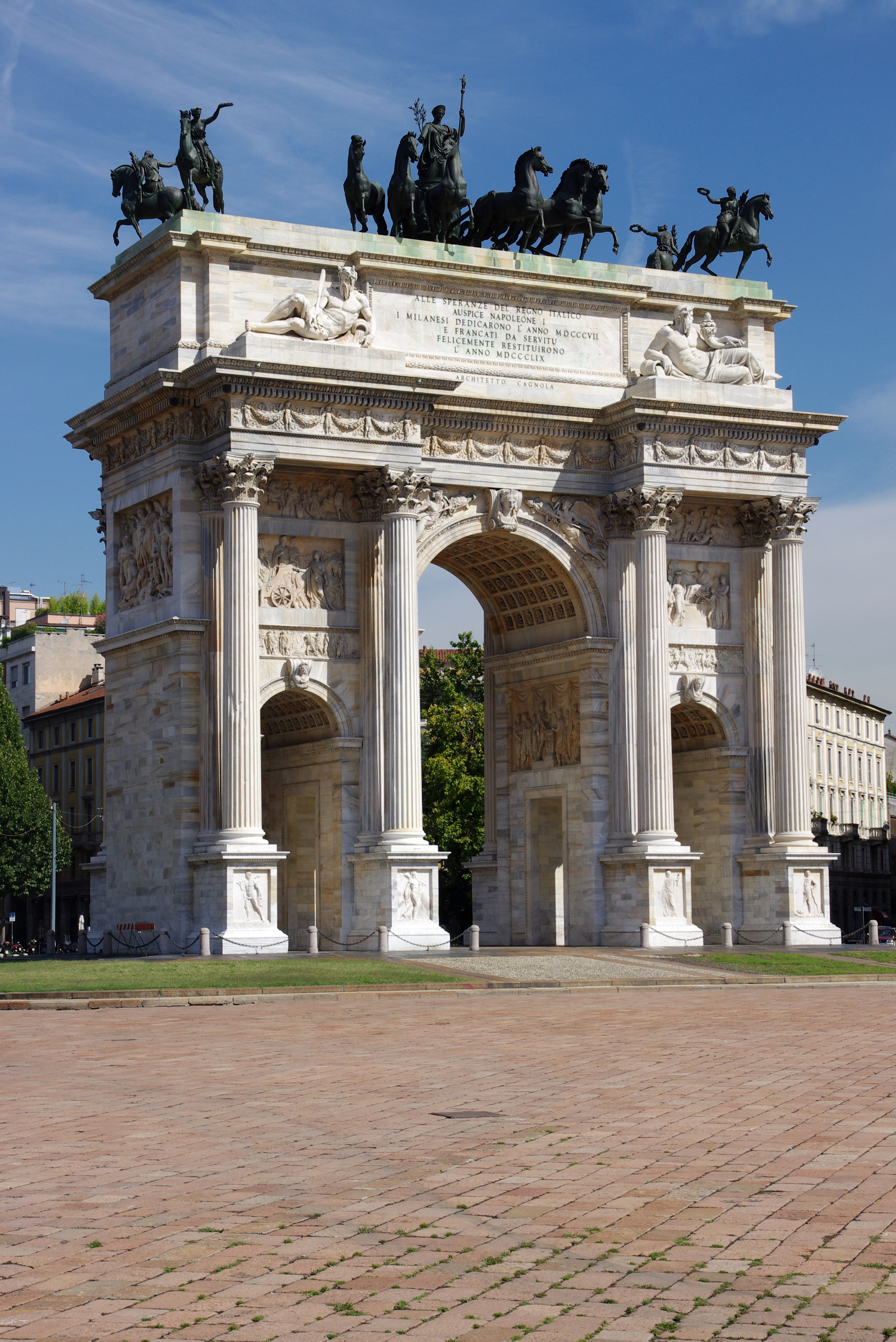
The Arch

The area surrounding Porta Sempione is a prominent historic district of Milan. The district also includes part of Corso Sempione, a large avenue leading to Porta Sempione from the northwest. Some of the most important streets in the area are Via Canonica, Via Luigi Cagnola, Via Abbondio Sangiorgio, Via Mario Pagano, Via Agostino Bertani, Via Antonio Canova, and Via Francesco Melzi d'Eril. Via Melzi d'Eril and Via Antonio Canova form a half circle concentric to Piazza Sempione.

The main landmark of the area is the Sforza Castle, which dominates the Simplon Park, the largest and most important city park in the centre of Milan. The park houses other renowned monuments and places of interest, such as the Branca Tower, 108 m high, the Palazzo dell'Arte (one of the seats of the Triennale art expo), sculptures by Giorgio de Chirico, and the public aquarium.

The whole area is one of the centres of the Milanese night life, with a number of bars, pubs, restaurants, and discos; since the RAI public television company, as well as some major radio stations, have their headquarters in the area, frequent appearances of celebrities contribute to the popularity of the Sempione's night life venues.

=== Usage ===
The gate was used at the opening ceremony for the 2026 Winter Olympics in Milan and Cortina d'Ampezzo for the Olympic cauldron.

== Sources ==
- Gardiner, Marguerite (Comtesse de Blessington) (1841). The Idler in Italy. Baudry's European Library. pp. 150–151.
