= Luigi Cagnola =

Italian Neoclassical architect (1762–1833)

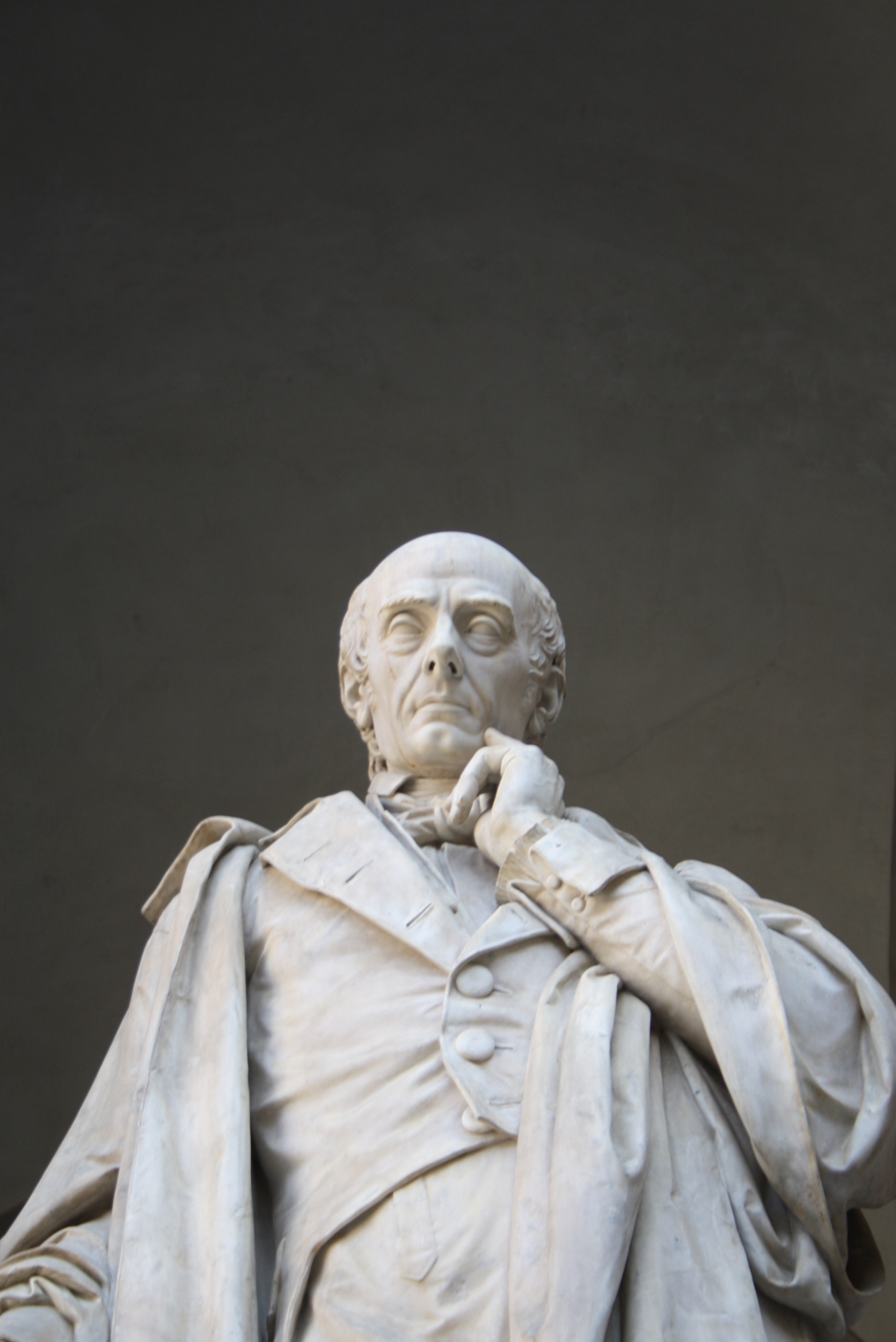
- The statue of Luigi Cagnola at Palazzo Brera in Milan (particular)
- Born: 9 June 1762; Milan, Duchy of Milan
- Died: 14 August 1833 (aged 71); Inverigo, Kingdom of Lombardy–Venetia
- Occupation: Architect
- Movement: Neoclassicism
- Buildings: Arco della Pace; San Lorenzo, Ghisalba; Villa La Rotonda, Inverigo

Marchese Luigi Cagnola (9 June 1762 – 14 August 1833) was an Italian Neoclassical architect.

== Biography ==
=== Early years and education ===
Cagnola was born in Milan. He was sent at the age of fourteen to the Clementine College at Rome, and afterwards studied law at the University of Pavia. He was intended for the legal profession, but his passion for architecture was too strong, and after holding some government posts at Milan, he entered as a competitor for the construction of the Porta Orientale. His designs were commended, but were not selected on account of the expense their adoption would have involved. In 1792 Cagnola contributed a series of measured drawings to the first volume of Angelo Fumagalli’s Delle antichità longobardico-milanesi.

=== Napoleonic period ===
From an early date in his career it was clear that when working on historic buildings his guiding principle was to conform to the style of the original architecture, whatever its period. He followed this criterion in his designs for the façade of Milan Cathedral (1790) and for completing the Shrine at Rho (1795). When the French entered Milan in 1796 Cagnola took refuge in Venice, where he studied Palladio and Sansovino and designed his first executed building, the Villa Zurla at Vaiano. In 1801 he returned to Milan and was appointed to the city council. In this capacity he was responsible for designing the temporary monuments erected for such celebrations as the coronation of Napoleon. To celebrate the victory of Marengo (1800) he organized the construction of the so-called Atrium of Porta Marengo (1801–14), producing a design that incorporated the entire Corso di Porta Ticinese. His plan allowed for three pairs of symmetrical buildings (two market arcades, two toll-houses, and two other edifices to replace the medieval gate). Only the Atrium on the bridge and the two toll-houses were built, however.

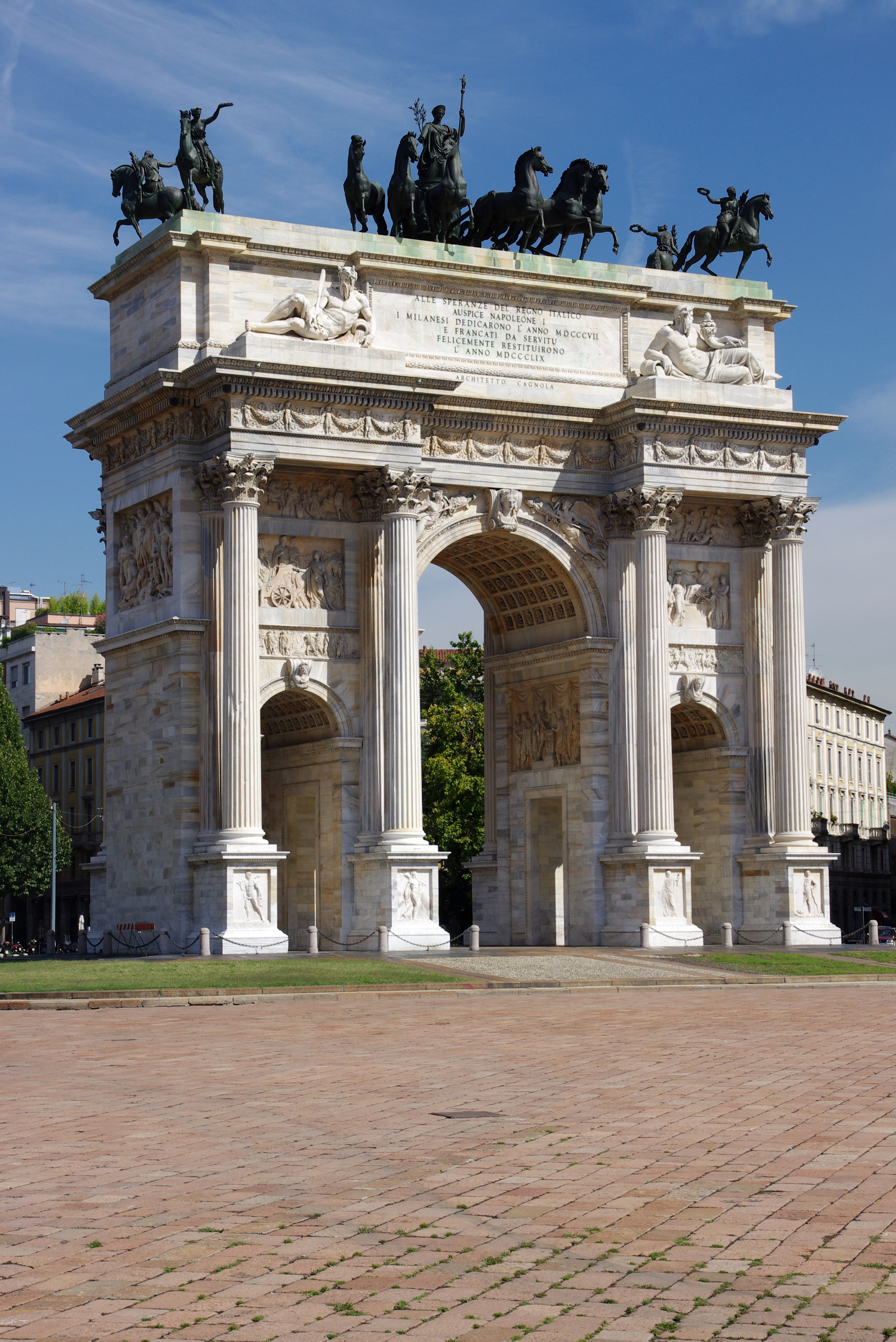
The Arco della Pace, 1807

During this period the Rationalist principles of Cagnola’s training became integrated with his study of Palladio, although his interpretation of the latter resulted in works that were more austere in design and use of materials, such as his project for a triangular casino (c. 1787; plans at Milan, Sforza Castle). In 1806 Cagnola was called upon to erect a triumphal arch to celebrate the marriage of the Viceroy Eugène de Beauharnais to Princess Augusta of Bavaria. The arch was of wood, but was of such beauty, that it was rebuilt in marble and placed at the entrance to the Foro Bonaparte on the Strada del Sempione. The first stone was laid on October 14, 1807. The result was the magnificent Arco della Pace ("Arch of Peace") at Porta Sempione in Milan, surpassed in dimensions only by the Arc de Triomphe in Paris.

Inspired by its earlier contemporary, the aforementioned Arc de Triomphe du Carrousel in Paris, the neoclassical triumphal arch is 25 m high and 24 m wide, decorated with a number of bas-reliefs, statues, and corinthian columns. Several among Milan's foremost artists collaborated to the decoration of the gate, including Pompeo Marchesi, Luigi Acquisti, Grazioso Rusca, Giovanni Battista Comolli, Luigi Marchesi, Gaetano Monti, Camillo Pacetti and Angelo Pizzi.

In 1807 Cagnola was appointed a member of the Commissione d’Ornato of Milan, the body created to regulate building activities in the city. He drew up the Commission’s Piano dei Rettifili, which would have radically altered the city with a multi-centric network of roads, based in part on those of ancient Rome. Although the plan was not put into effect, Cagnola was able to influence Milanese urban planning. Among his proposals were a project for a botanical garden, intended to occupy a vast area outside the Porta Nuova, and a plan for a Temple of Fame (1809–14) involving a spacious arcaded complex connected to the city walls, which would have replaced the cemetery of the Ospedale Maggiore. Cagnola also designed a vast portico composed of 144 columns to be built at the Moncenisio Pass (1813), in the western Alps, as a monument commemorating Napoleon’s gratitude towards the French and Italian people after the battle of Bautzen (1813).

=== Austrian rule ===
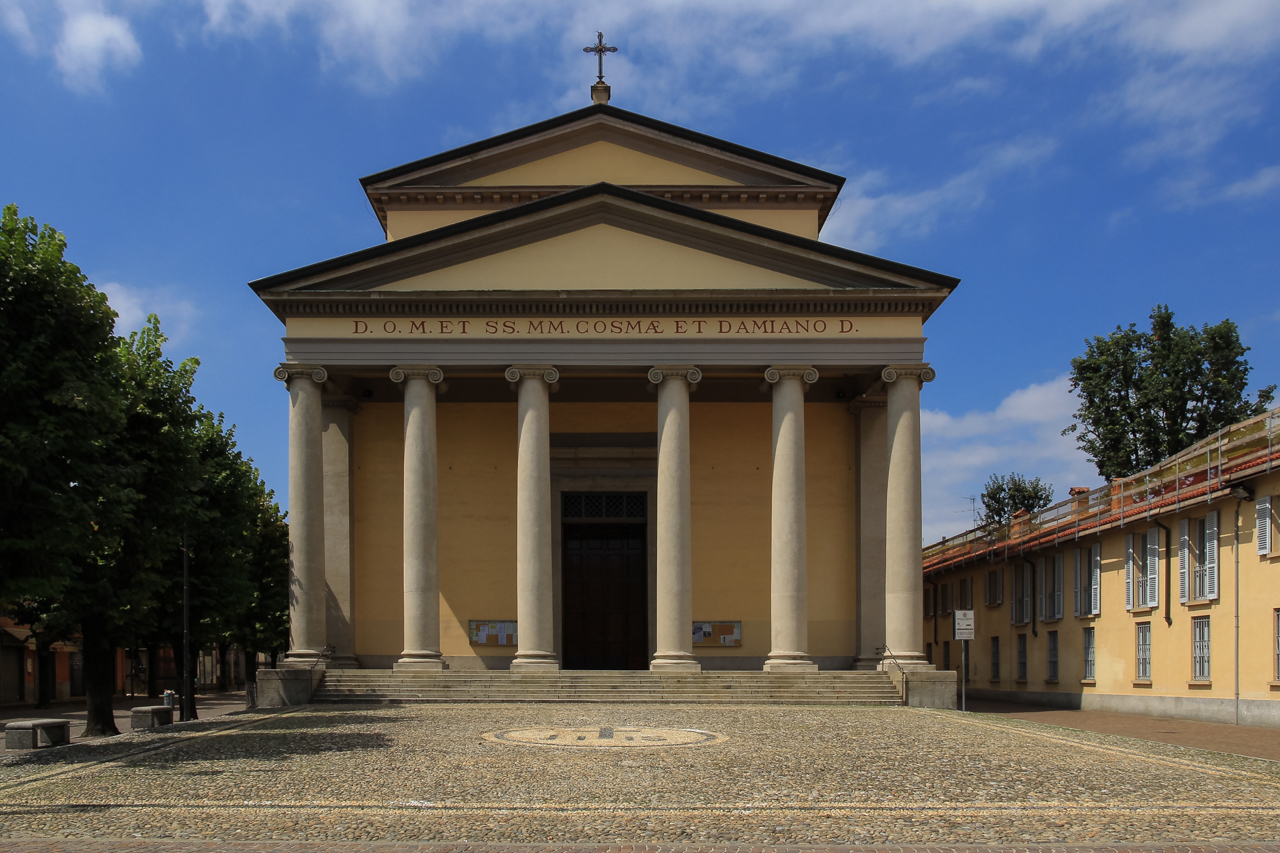
Church of Concorezzo, 1818

After the fall of Napoleon Cagnola had few opportunities to express himself in the grand, celebratory manner of the previous 15 years. Although he remained an eminent architect, he was no longer able to intervene as frequently in civic building. At the church of Concorezzo (begun 1818), Cagnola modified his Palladian design by reducing the amount of decoration, and at the church of San Lorenzo, Ghisalba (1822–33), near Bergamo, he adopted a massive Pantheon theme. His designs for the enlargement of the Hofburg and the Burgtor in Vienna (both 1818–24), the latter executed by Pietro Nobile with substantial modifications, are massive and impersonal. In 1825 Emperor Francis I visited Milan; this provided Cagnola with a second opportunity to realize his proposals for the layout of the Porta Orientale, where he planned to rebuild the Arco del Sempione, which had been left unfinished after the fall of Napoleon, and to build a triumphal atrium in stone. However, only a gilt bronze model (Milan, Biblioteca Ambrosiana), to the scale 1:28, was executed under his direction.

Several of Cagnola’s most successful works were produced in the last 20 years of his life, including the church tower at Urgnano and his own villa at Inverigo, near Como, in which he employed unusual architectural forms and materials. The ground-plan of the Urgnano church tower (1824–9) is circular, with a series of superimposed orders rising from a podium and crowned with a small tempietto-like structure, with caryatids supporting a small hemispherical dome. The villa at Inverigo (1813–3) stands on a hill and is loosely based on Palladio’s Villa La Rotonda. The colonnaded portico of white stucco, approached by a staircase, the rear façade with atlantids sculpted by Pompeo Marchesi, the arcades imitating Roman aqueducts, the ‘Egyptian’ hall and portal and the triumphal arch entrances all create a succession of remarkable contrasting views and spaces. Cagnola died in Inverigo in 1833. His influence on the next generation of architects, including Francesco Peverelli and Pietro Bianchi, was considerable.

== Gallery ==
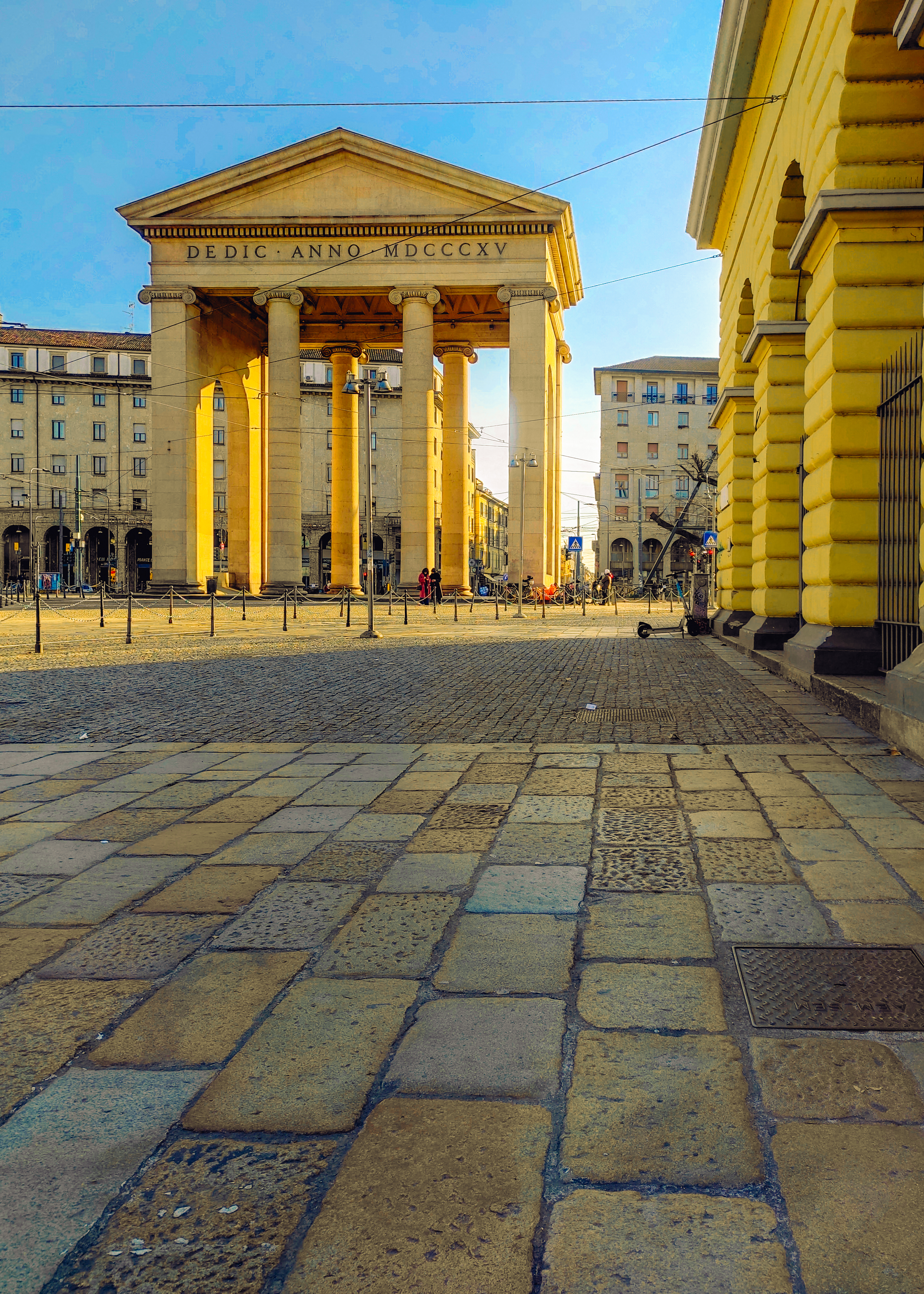
Porta Ticinese, Milan

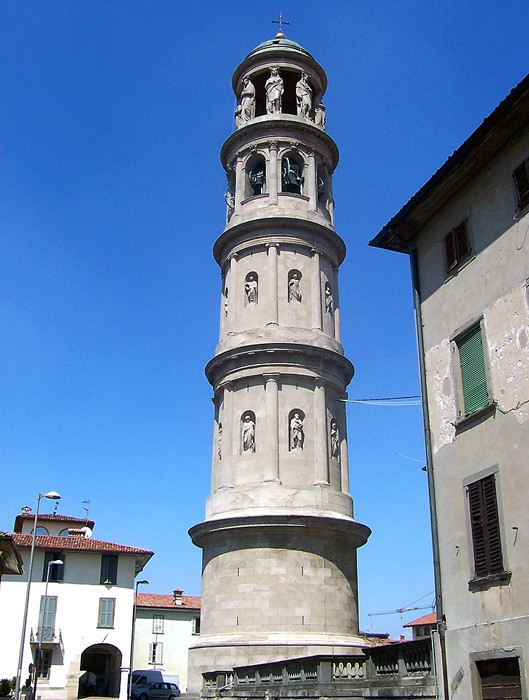
Church tower of Urgnano

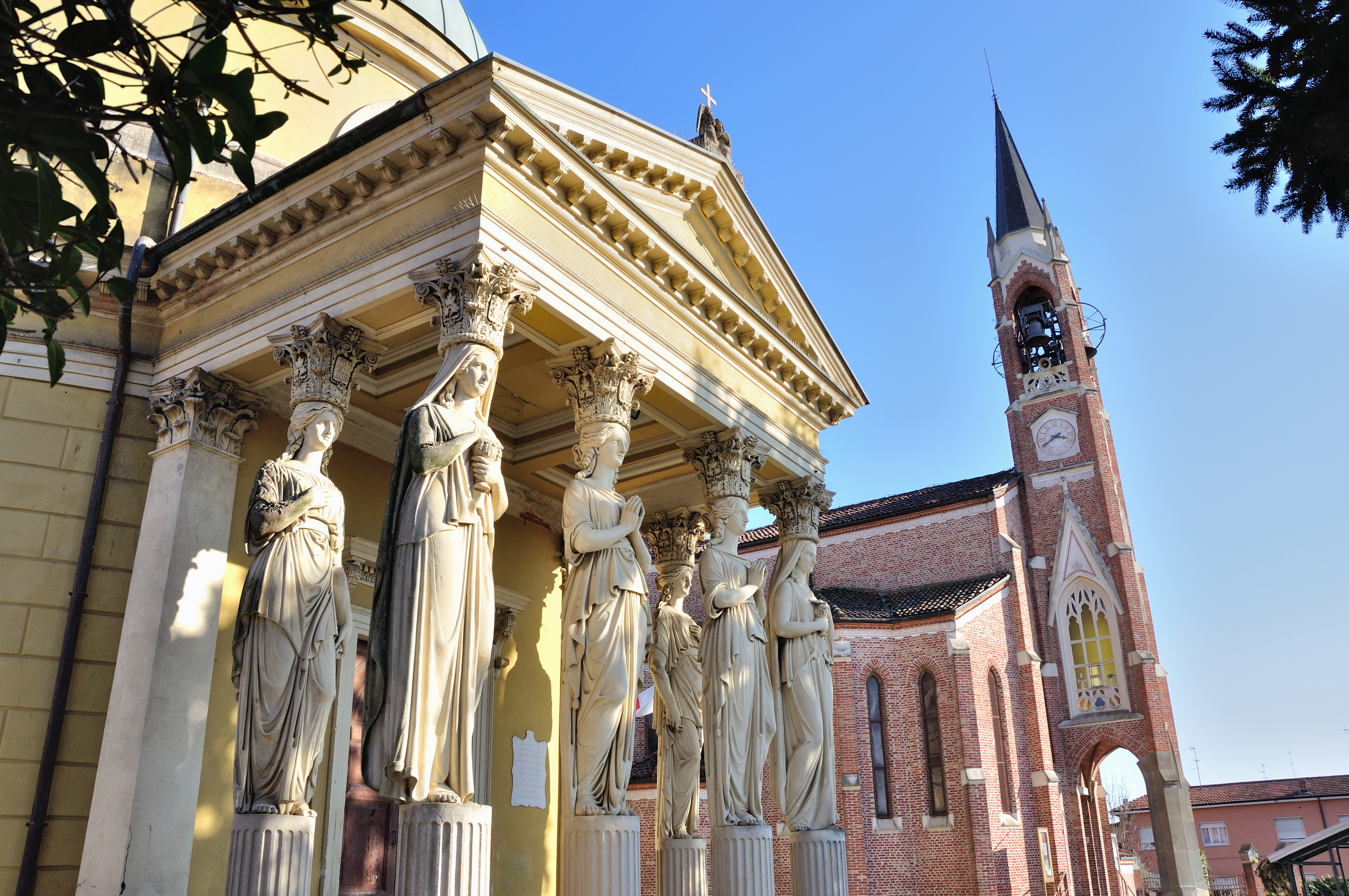
Façade of the Church of Gervasius and Protasius, Tregasio

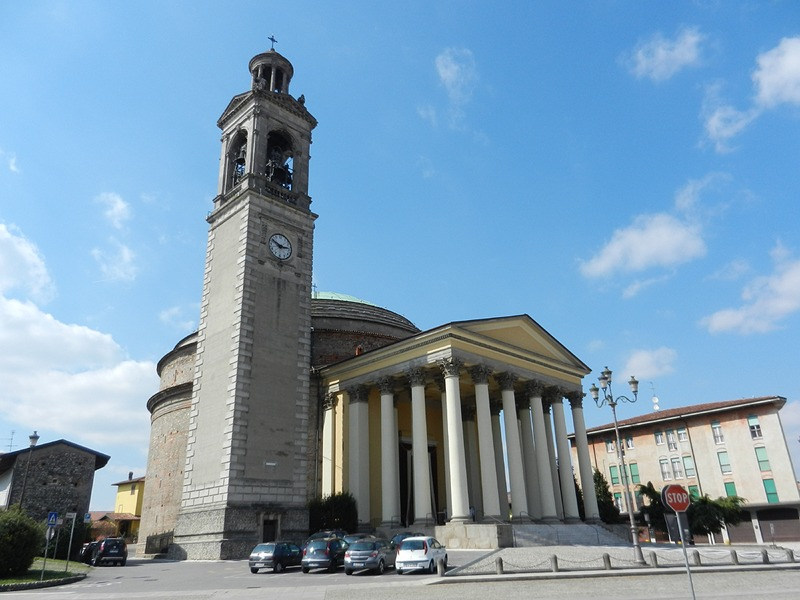
Church of San Lorenzo, Ghisalba

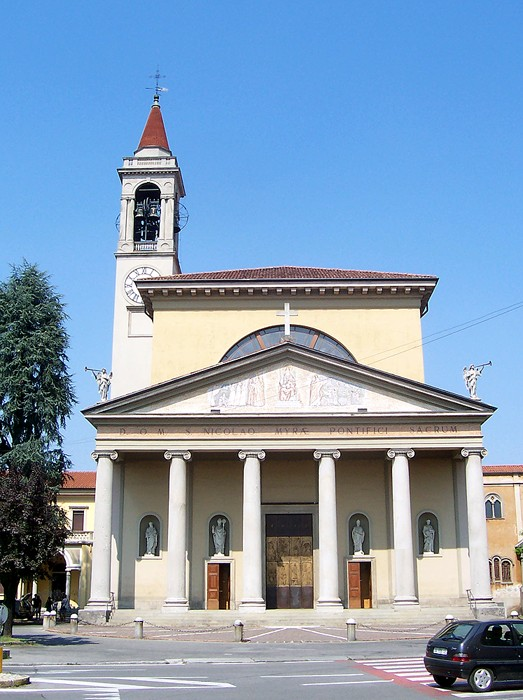
Church of San Nicolò, Vaprio d'Adda
