= San Lorenzo, Ghisalba =

Neoclassical-style Roman Catholic church in Italy

Coordinates: 45°35′39″N 9°45′12″E

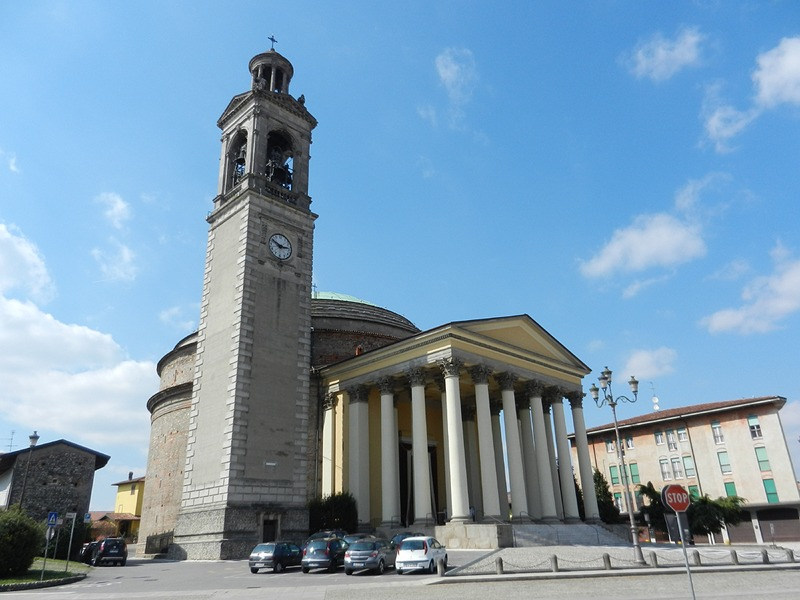
San Lorenzo, Ghisalba

San Lorenzo is a neoclassical-style, Roman Catholic parish church located in the town of Ghisalba, province of Bergamo, region of Lombardy, Italy.

== History ==
The church at the site appears to have been erected on the remains of a temple of Jove. The present church was designed in the 19th century by Luigi Cagnola; construction was initiated in 1821 and consecrated in 1834.

The Pantheon-like structure is preceded by a pronaos with 14 corinthian columns. The columns were restored in 1975. The interior is lit by windows in the cupola.

The main altar was also designed by Cagnola in 1831–1834 with polychrome marbles. The cupola was frescoed (1828–30) by Francesco Tencalla, and restored in 1975 by Angelo Pasinetti. The altarpieces in the three altars derive from the prior pieve, and were painted by Giovanni Paolo Cavagna.
