= Friedrich Wilhelm Eugen Döll =

German sculptor

- Bust of Anton Raphael Mengs, c. 1780, Schlossmueum, Gotha
- Born: 8 October 1750; Veilsdorf, Holy Roman Empire
- Died: 30 March 1816 (aged 65); Gotha, Holy Roman Empire
- Education: Giuseppe Franchi, Anton von Maron and Anton Raphael Mengs
- Movement: Neoclassicism

Friedrich Wilhelm Eugen Döll (8 October 1750, Veilsdorf, near Hildburghausen – 30 March 1816, Gotha) was a German Neoclassical sculptor.

== Life ==
Friedrich Wilhelm Eugen Döll was born in Veilsdorf on 8 October 1750. Following a stay in Paris in 1772, with sculptor Jean-Antoine Houdon, he moved to Rome. He stayed there from 1773 to 1782, continuing his studies under the protection of Johann Friedrich Reiffenstein, the art advisor to the court of Gotha. Besides taking care of the studies and careers of the young pensioners like Tischbein and Döll, Reiffenstein was art advisor to Empress Catherine the Great and representative of the Imperial Academy of Arts. During his stay in Rome, Doel studied and copied antiquities and, through Reiffenstein's interest, he perfected his work under the guidance of the sculp-tor from Carrara, Giuseppe Franchi. He also studied with painters Anton von Maron, creating marble releifs and modeling terracottas on mythological subjects with a sober neoclassical taste.

In 1777, when Anton Raphael Mengs returned to Rome from Spain , Doel continued his studies under that painter. This encounter led to some bust portraits now at the Schlossmueum of Gotha. One is a bronze from 1777-1778, cast by Luigi Valadier, the father of the architect Giuseppe Valadier, which represents the head and a small bit of the bust of Johann Joachim Winckelmann. Another very similar work on the same subject is in mar- ble , sculpted in 1778-1780. A third bust, made in 1778-1779 portrays Mengs himself.

Thanks to Reiffenstein, Döll broadened his client base in those years, making some sculptures commissioned by Russian aristocrats, such as the statue of Gratitude (1778-1780) for Catherine II of Russia, which was commissioned by the president of the Imperial Academy of Arts, Count Ivan Shuvalov; and the statue of Catherine II as Minerva, commissioned by Count Tsernishev. On his return to Gotha, Döll was appointed court sculptor in 1781 and received commissions for busts, monuments and reliefs, particularly for the residences at Gotha, Anhalt-Dessau and Meiningen. In 1786 he became a professor (his own pupils included the painter Louise Seidler) and in 1787 was put in charge of art monuments in Gotha. He died in Gotha on 30 March 1816, aged 65.

== Works ==
Bust of Johann Joachim Winckelmann, 1779, Schlossmueum, Gotha

His masterworks are:

- Faith, Love and Hope at the Hauptkirche in Lüneburg
- 22 stucco high-reliefs at the princely riding-school at Hauptreliefs in Stuck an der fürstlichen Reitbahn in Dessau
- lifesize statue of Catherine II of Russia as Minerva
- Catherine II, with a maiden before her offering at an altar
- Winckelmann's monument in the Rotonda in Rome
- busts of Sappho and Raphael Mengs
- The New Muses, Bas-relief
- Gustavus Adolphus of Sweden on a horse, crowned by victories, bas-relief
- lifesize figures of Minerva, a Muse and Hygieia;
- grave-monument to the Gräfin von Einsiedel at Dresden and duke Karl von Meiningen;
- monument to Gotthold Ephraim Lessing at the Wolfenbüttel library
- Kepler's statue at Regensburg.

== Bibliography ==
- Literatur zu Friedrich Wilhelm Döll in der GBV
- Friedrich Wilhelm Eugen Döll in the German National Library catalogue
- Beck, August (1877). "Friedrich Wilhelm Eugen Döll". Allgemeine Deutsche Biographie (in German). Vol. 5. Leipzig: Duncker & Humblot. p. 313.
- Beck, August (1877). "Friedrich Wilhelm Eugen Döll(Korrektur)". Allgemeine Deutsche Biographie (in German). Vol. 6. Leipzig: Duncker & Humblot. p. 795.
- Maaz, Bernhard: "Das Lächeln des Weisen. Englische Einflüsse in der deutschen Porträtplastik gegen 1800: Friedrich Wilhelm Eugen Doell und seine Kaestner-Büste", In: Jahrbuch der Berliner Museen, ISSN 0075-2207, Bd. 44 (2002), S.35-48
- Rau, Petra: "Friedrich Wilhelm Doell (1750 - 1816) : Leben und Werk", Cluj-Napoca : Editura Mega, 2003. – 518 S. : zahlr. Ill. Hochschulschrift: Zugl.: Mainz, Univ., Diss., 2000 ISBN 973-86505-2-6
