= Camillo Pacetti =

Italian sculptor (1758–1826)

- Giuseppe Mazzola, Portrait of Camillo Pacetti, c. 1810, Brera Academy, Milan
- Born: 2 May 1758; Rome, Papal States
- Died: 16 July 1826 (aged 68); Milan, Kingdom of Lombardy–Venetia
- Education: Accademia di San Luca
- Movement: Neoclassicism

Camillo Pacetti (Rome, 2 May 1758 – Milan, 16 July 1826) was an Italian sculptor. He was the brother of Vincenzo Pacetti, another sculptor.

== Biography ==
Camillo Pacetti was born in Rome on 2 May 1758. A student of the Accademia di San Luca, he later worked in various churches in Rome and Milan. In 1804, on Antonio Canova's recommendation, he was offered the role of chair of the Accademia di Belle Arti di Brera in Milan, to succeed Giuseppe Franchi.

In 1810 he was appointed to supervise the design and realization of Milan Cathedral’s statues; he himself carved the Law of Christ, Moses, Saint James the Great and, in collaboration with Giuseppe Buzzi, Saint James the Less and Saint John the Evangelist (1802–12; Milan Cathedral, façade). Pacetti contributed reliefs for the Arco della Pace at Milan (the arch planned by Luigi Cagnola and also featuring sculpture by Luigi Canonica). His oeuvre also included busts (e.g. Giuseppe Bossi, 1817, and Andrea Appiani, c. 1820; both Milan, Pinacoteca di Brera) and numerous models (Galleria d'Arte Moderna, Milan). His subject matter ranged from portraits to mythological and allegorical scenes.

Pacetti was engaged by Josiah Wedgwood in Rome from 1787/88 under the supervision of John Flaxman, to model six tablets illustrating the life of Achilles. A pen and wash drawing by Pacetti of Achilles on the back of Centaur hunting a Lion is in the Wedgwood Museum, Barlaston - it is copied from a similar image on a classical marble, the Luna Disc of c. 800-400 BC in the Capitoline Museum, substituting that work's female centaur for Chiron. He completed a Minerva for the Brera.

Pacetti died in Milan on 16 July 1826. Some of his notable students were Abbondio Sangiorgio and Benedetto Cacciatori.

== Gallery ==
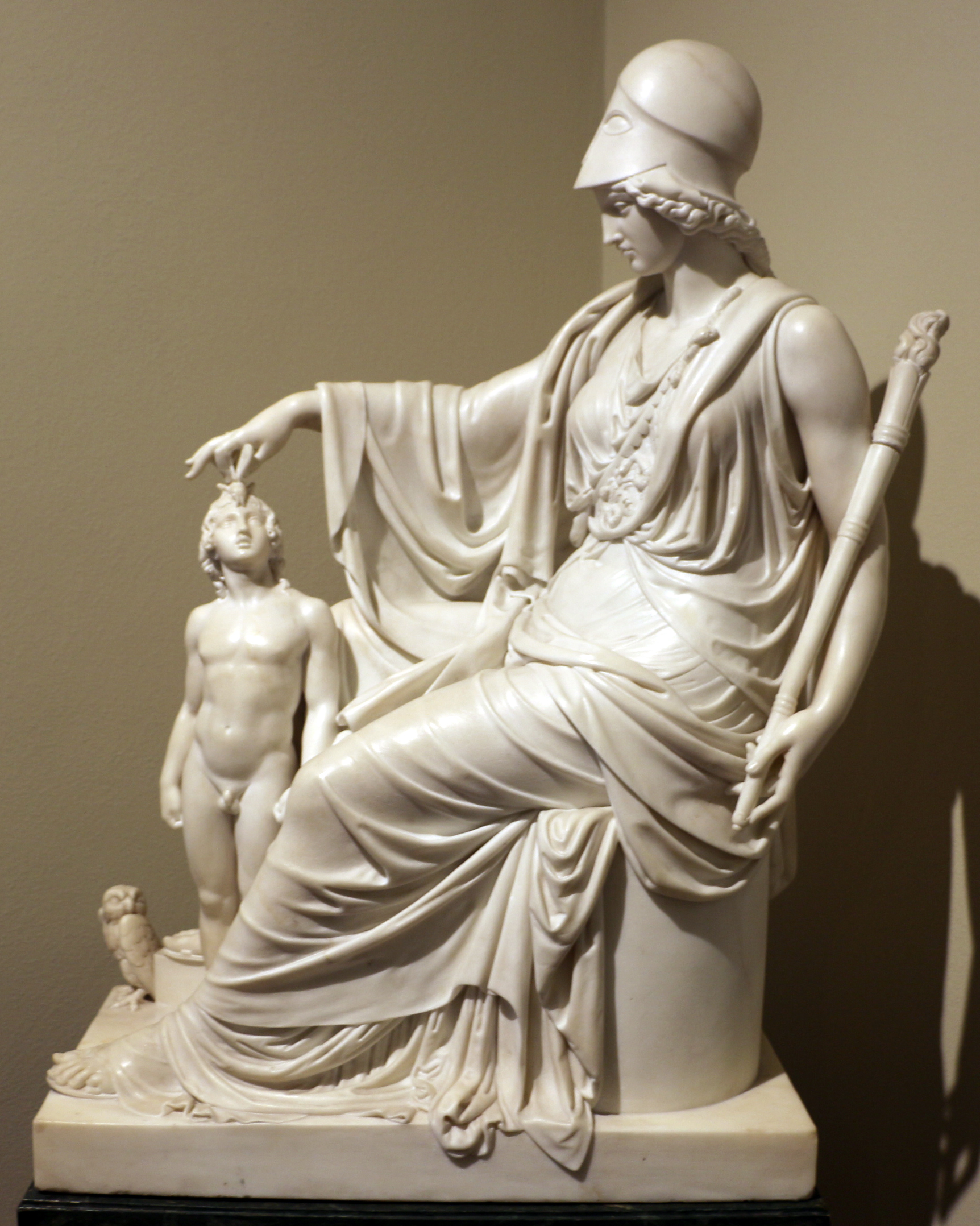
Minerva infonde l'anima all'automa di Prometeo, Galleria d'Arte Moderna, Milan

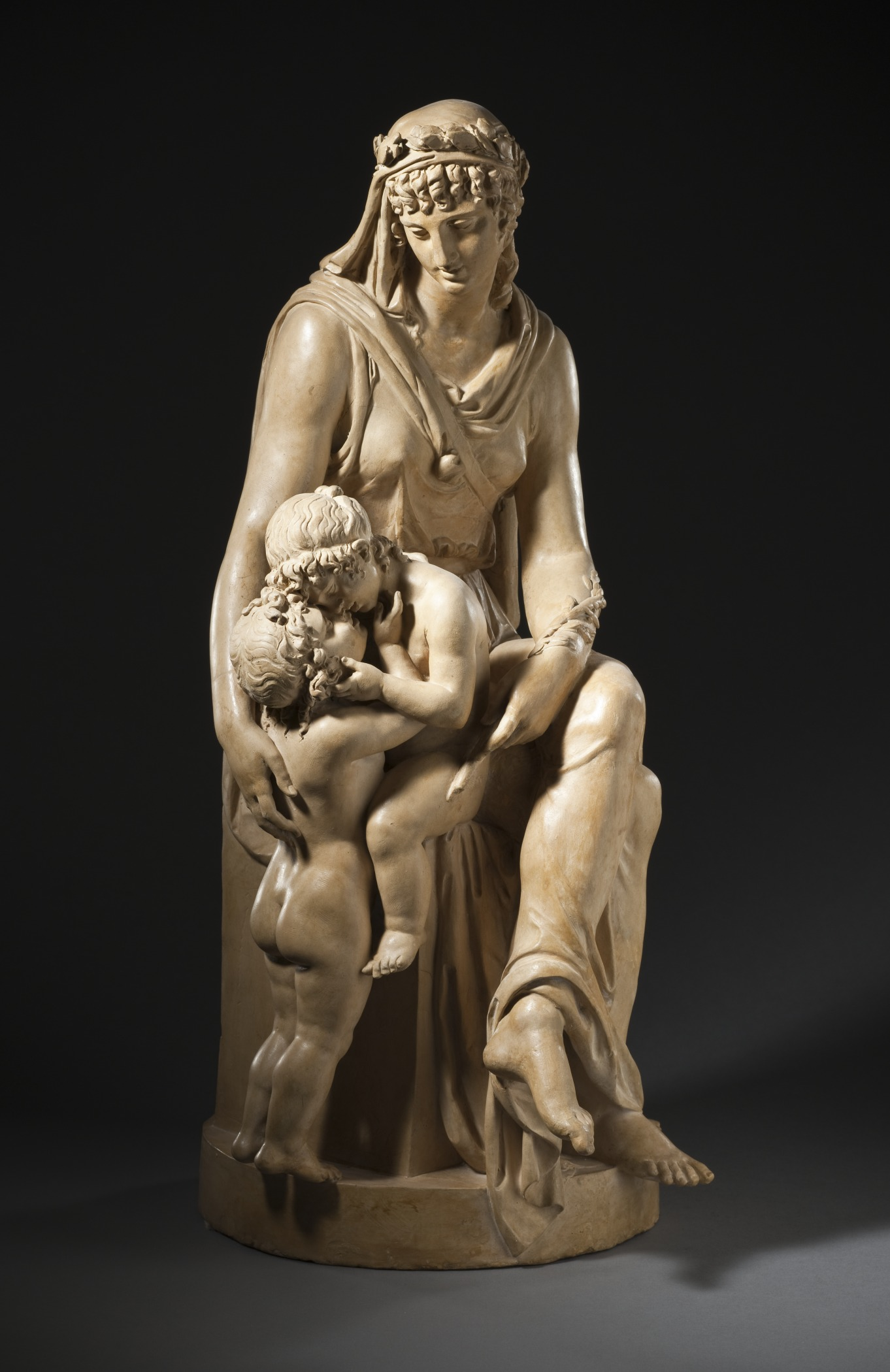
Allegory of Peace, Los Angeles County Museum of Art

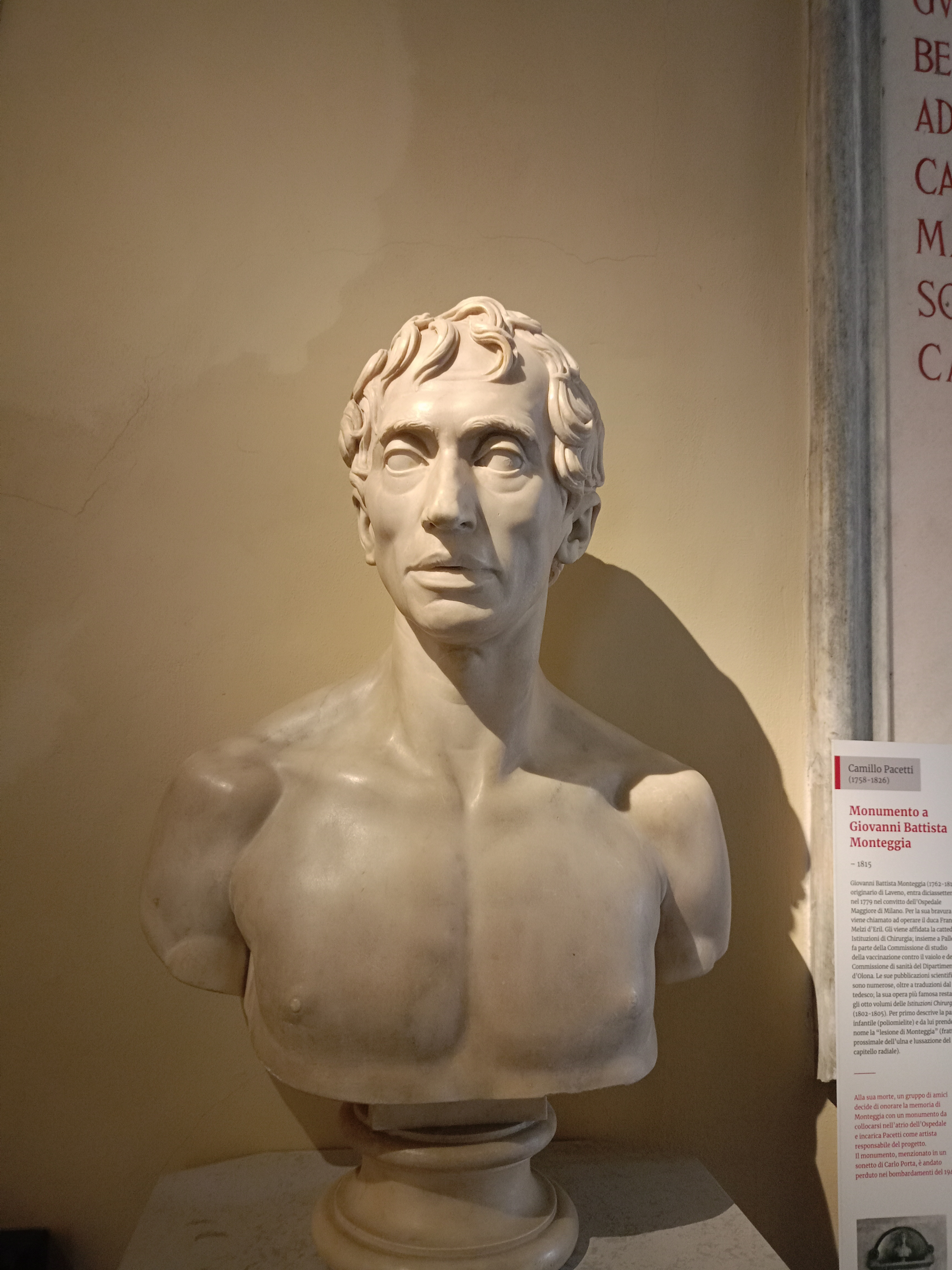
Bust for Giovanni Battista Monteggia, Santissima Annunziata, Università Statale, Milan

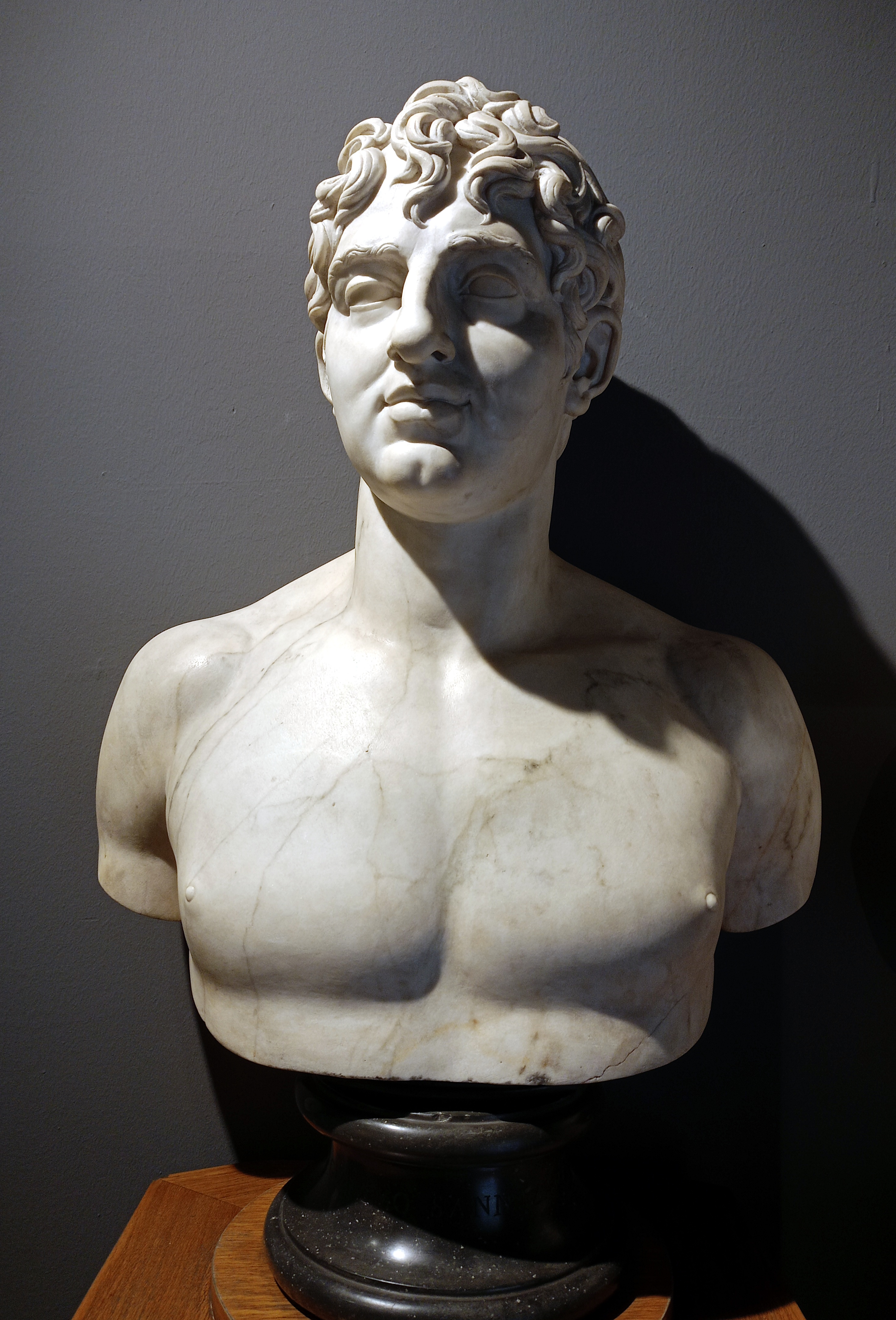
Bust of Jacopo Sannazzari della Ripa, Università Statale, Milan

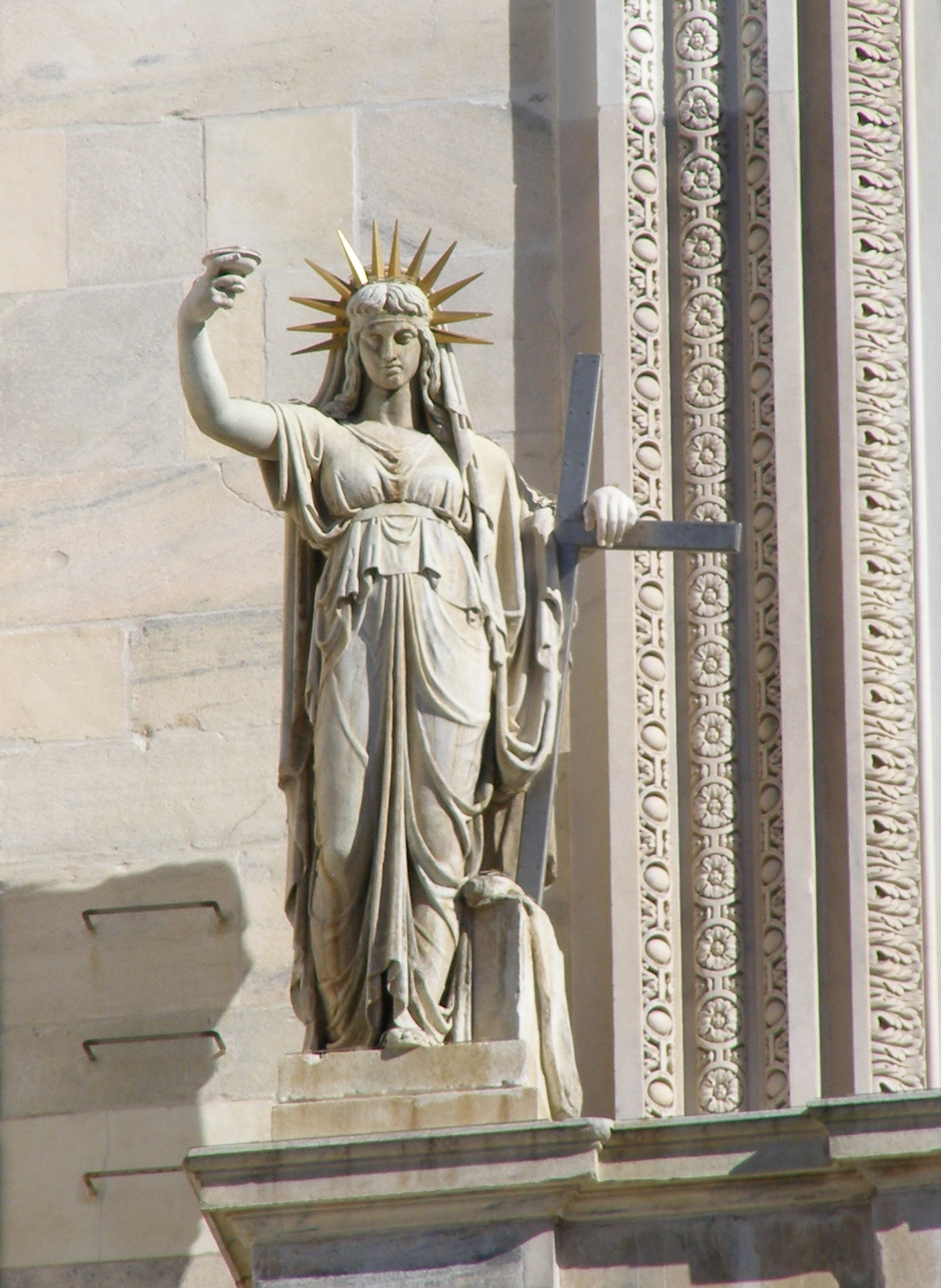
The New Law, Milan Cathedral

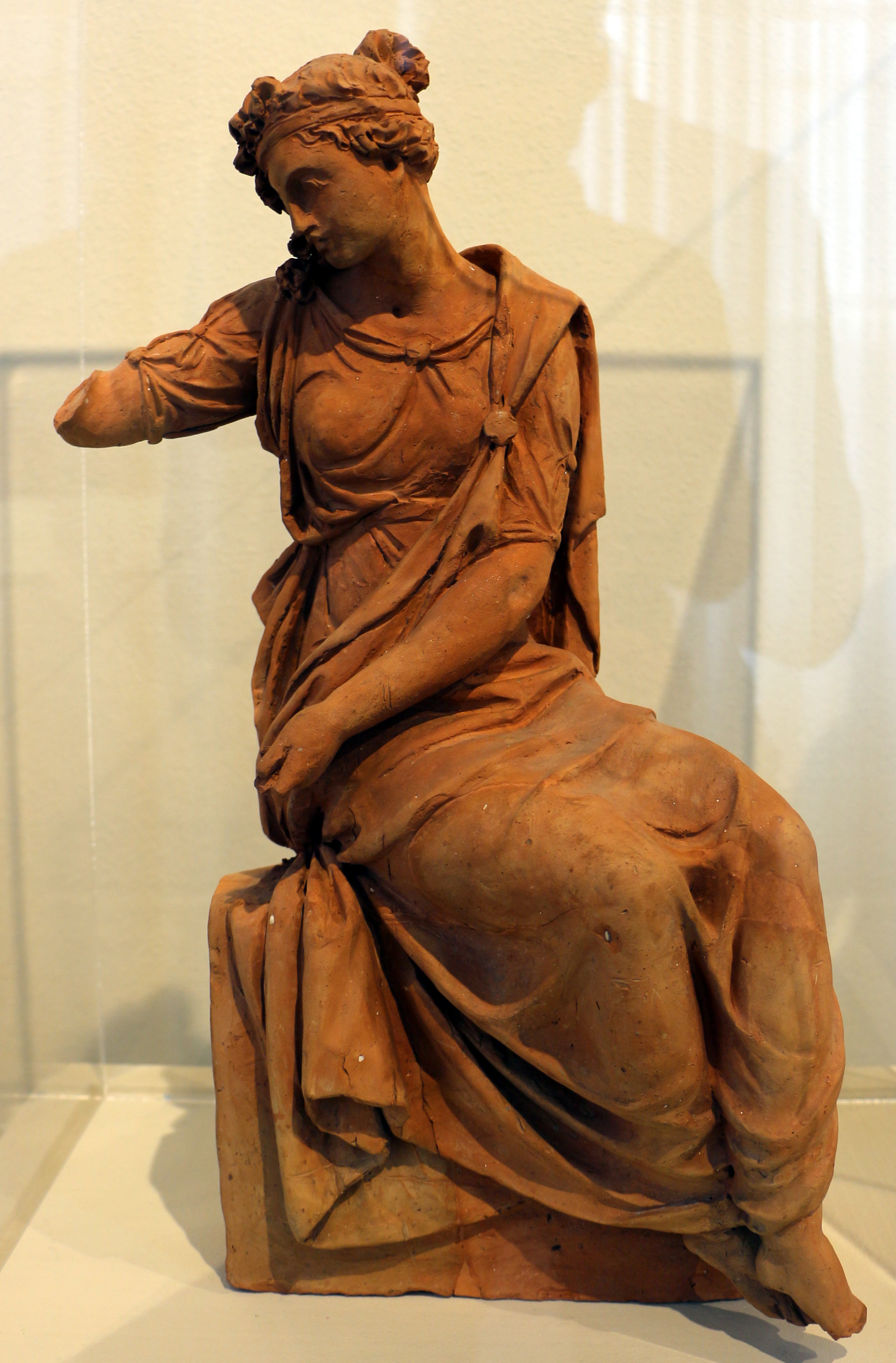
Maquette, Galleria d'Arte Moderna, Milan

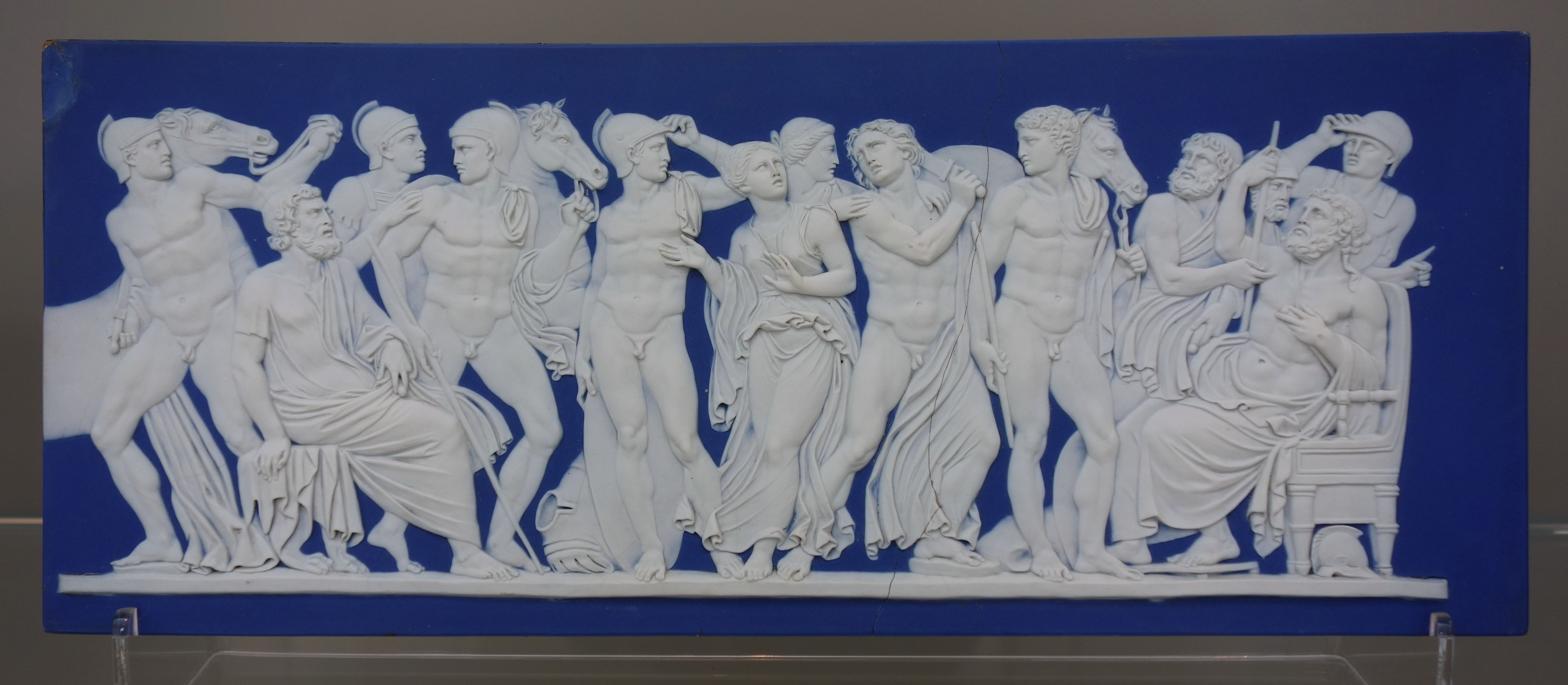
The Discovery of Achilles, about 1788, modelled by Camillo Pacetti V&A Museum no. 4938-1901
