= Ghisalba =

- Comune
- Comune di Ghisalba
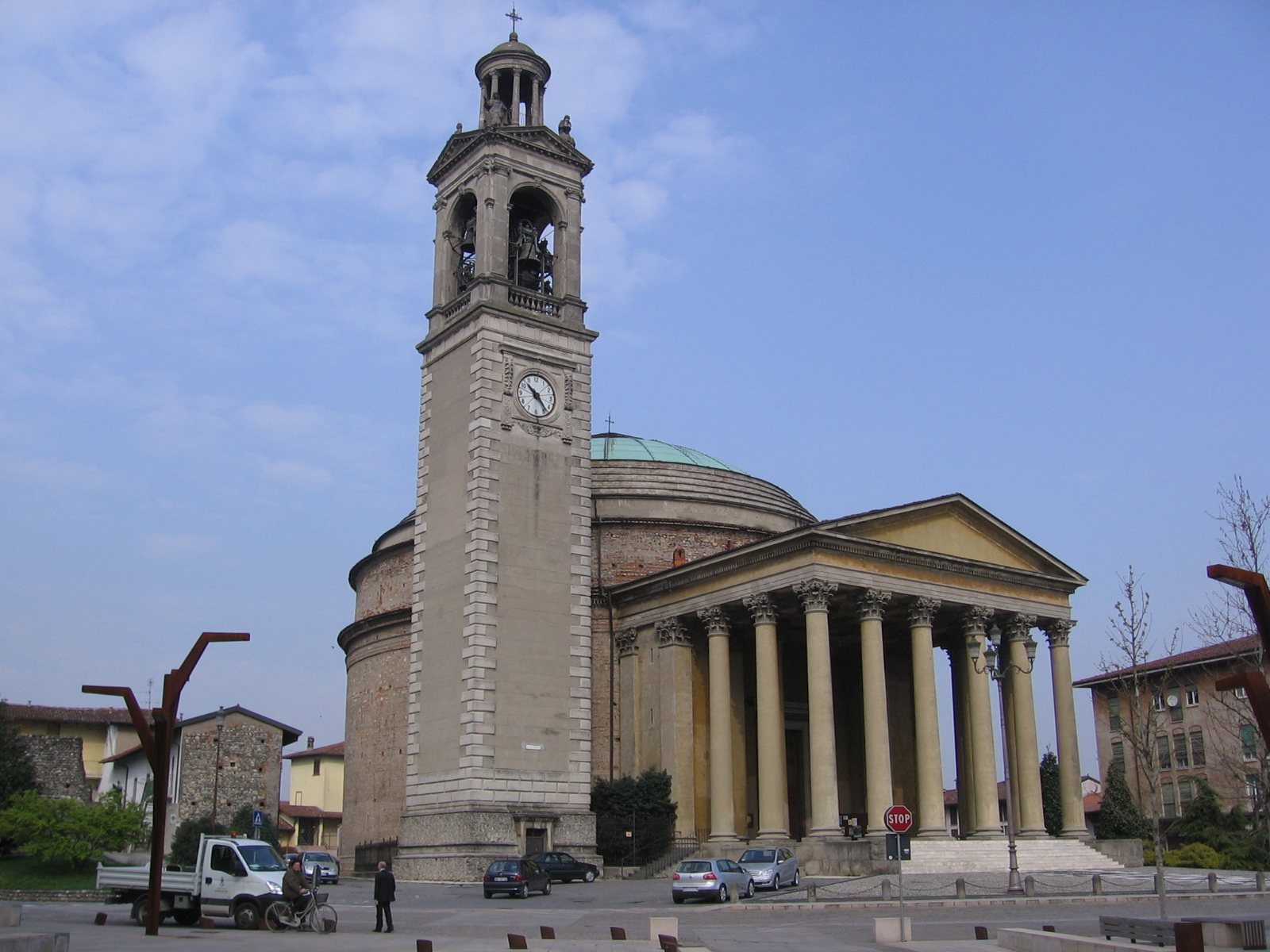
- San Lorenzo Church

- Location within Italy Location within Lombardy
- Coordinates: 45°36′N 9°45′E
- Country: Italy
- Region: Lombardy
- Province: Province of Bergamo (BG)
- Frazioni: Villanova

Area
  - Total: 10.2 km^{2} (3.9 sq mi)
- Elevation: 170 m (560 ft)

Population (Dec. 2025)
  - Total: 6,200
  - Density: 610/km^{2} (1,600/sq mi)
- Demonym: Ghisalbesi
- Time zone: UTC+1 (CET)
  - Summer (DST): UTC+2 (CEST)
- Postal code: 24050
- Dialing code: 0363
- Patron saint: San Lorenzo Levita e Martire

Ghisalba is a comune (municipality) in the Province of Bergamo in the Italian region of Lombardy, located about 50 kilometres (31 mi) northeast of Milan and about 13 kilometres (8 mi) southeast of Bergamo. As of 31 December 2010, it had a population of 6,200 and an area of 10.2 square kilometres (3.9 mi^{2}).

Ghisalba borders the following municipalities: Calcinate, Cavernago, Cologno al Serio, Martinengo, Mornico al Serio, Urgnano.

== Demographics ==
Historical population

Year	Pop.	±%
1861	1,538	—
1871	1,568	+2.0%
1881	1,685	+7.5%
1901	1,713	+1.7%
1911	1,952	+14.0%

Year	Pop.	±%
1921	2,032	+4.1%
1931	2,180	+7.3%
1936	2,365	+8.5%
1951	2,687	+13.6%
1961	2,711	+0.9%

Year	Pop.	±%
1971	3,063	+13.0%
1981	3,724	+21.6%
1991	4,168	+11.9%
2001	4,626	+11.0%

Source: Data from ISTAT
