= Giuseppe Franchi =

Italian sculptor

- Giuseppe Franchi, portrait by Anton Raphael Mengs
- Born: 1731; Carrara, Duchy of Massa and Carrara
- Died: 11 February 1806 (aged 74–75); Milan, Kingdom of Italy
- Occupation: Architect
- Movement: Neoclassicism
- Practice: Academy of Fine Arts of Parma

Giuseppe Franchi (1731 – 11 February 1806) was an Italian Neoclassical sculptor, mainly active in Milan.

== Biography ==
Giuseppe Franchi was born in Carrara in 1731 to Giacomo and Anna Maria Bonanni. His father was an architect and a member of the Academy of Fine Arts of Parma, where Franchi completed a brief apprenticeship. Between 1755 and 1757, he moved to Parma, where he collaborated with the court sculptor Jean-Baptiste Boudard. During this period, Franchi came into contact with the Neoclassical tendencies that dominated Parma under the Bourbons.

After a poorly documented study trip to Spain, Franchi settled in Rome, where he studied classical art under Johann Joachim Winckelmann. In 1764, he created his first work, the funerary monument of Princess Teresa del Grillo Pamphilj for the Church of Santa Maria degli Angeli, Assisi. In Rome, Franchi executed numerous copies and restorations of ancient Greco-Roman sculptures for Prince Charles William of Brunswick, earning a reputation as an expert antiquarian.

In 1775, he was appointed Professor of Sculpture at the newly established Brera Academy. He accepted the position and arrived in Milan in April 1776. In Milan, he befriended the architect Giuseppe Piermarini, a disciple of Vanvitelli who was involved in numerous projects for the Habsburg court.

In 1778, Franchi contributed to the decorations on the façade of the Teatro alla Scala in Milan. During this period, he also created statues of the Olympian deities for the second tier of the Caryatid Chamber in the Royal Palace of Milan. The following year, the Accademia Nazionale Virgiliana of Mantua commissioned him to make replicas of ancient sculptures from the Gonzaga collections for the new museum of the institution. Between 1781 and 1782, Franchi created the statues of mermaids and dolphins for the fountain that Piermarini designed at Piazza Fontana. In 1783, he executed the pyramid-shaped funerary monument of Karl Joseph von Firmian in the church of San Bartolomeo, Milan. Shortly afterwards, Pietro Verri commissioned him a medallion in memory of the Milanese mathematician Paolo Frisi, which was set into the right pier of the chapel of the Assumption in the Church of Sant'Alessandro in Zebedia.

The Lion realized by Franchi for the Terrasse de l'Orangerie, Tuileries Garden, Paris.

In 1789 Franchi created a bust of Giovenale Sacchi for the Academy of Sciences of the Institute of Bologna, and the following year he sculpted an effigy of Maria Beatrice d'Este, Duchess of Massa, commissioned by her daughter, Maria Theresa of Austria-Este. His busts of Giovanni Battista Branca (1792) and Maria Gaetana Agnesi (1802), preserved in the Biblioteca Ambrosiana, combine classical purity of form with the physiognomy of the subjects. In 1791, he created a bust of Giuseppe Parini which is located in the loggia of the courtyard of Brera Academy. A replica of the bust is located in the park of Villa Amalia in Erba, and a bronze version is in the room dedicated to Parini in the Biblioteca Ambrosiana In April 1791, Franchi was elected a member of the Accademia di San Luca in Rome.

Franchi held the chair of sculpture at Brera until 1804, when he was succeeded by Camillo Pacetti. His pupils included Pompeo Marchesi, Giovanni Battista Comolli, Angelo Pizzi and Friedrich Wilhelm Eugen Döll. His last works were two marble lion sculptures installed in 1818 on the western terrace walls of the Tuileries Garden overlooking Place de la Concorde in Paris, near the Jeu de Paume and the Musée de l'Orangerie. Franchi died in Milan on 11 February 1806 and was buried in the cemetery of Porta Comasina.

== See also ==
- Neoclassical architecture in Milan

== Bibliography ==
- Brook, Carolina (1998). "FRANCHI, Giuseppe". Dizionario Biografico degli Italiani (in Italian). Vol. 50: Francesco 1. Sforza–Gabbi. Rome: Institute of the Italian Encyclopaedia. ISBN 978-88-12-00032-6.
- "Franchi, Giuseppe". Benezit Dictionary of Artists. Oxford: Oxford University Press. 2011. doi:10.1093/benz/9780199773787.article.B00067222.
