= Villa La Rotonda, Inverigo =

Coordinates: 45.7410°N 9.2194°E

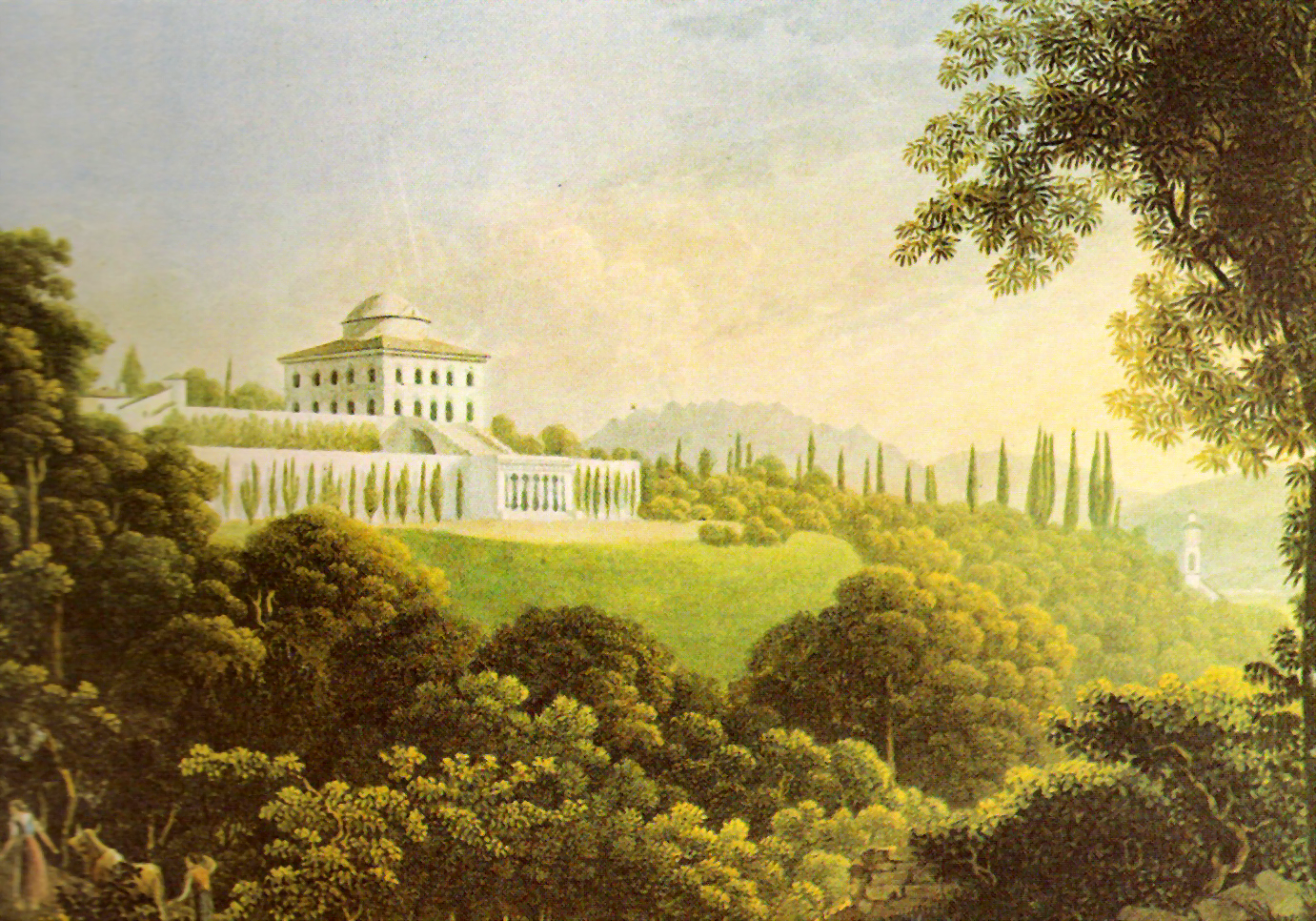
Painted vedute of Villa

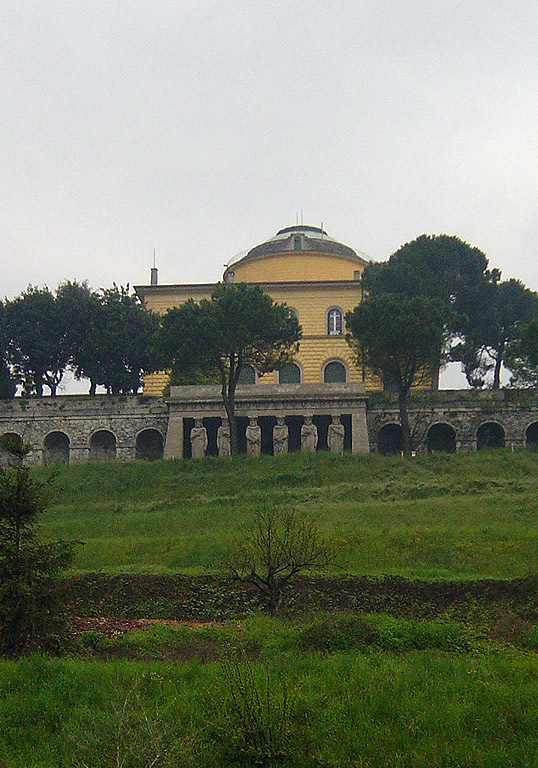
View of telamons and dome

The Villa La Rotonda is a 19th-century villa located on Via Privata D'Adda #2 just outside the town of Inverigo, Province of Como, Lombardy, Italy.

== History ==
The villa was built for himself by the Neoclassical architect Luigi Cagnola, and after his death in 1833, completed by his pupil Francesco Peverelli.

The work is a preening agglomeration of academic quotations, hitched together to create a house that lacks the essence of an era and the passion of any specific style. It is an architectural showplace, with a central block lacking rooms for daily life. The entrance has a colonnaded ancient Greek propylaea, behind which is a square block with a turret-like dome (an array recalling Villa Capra "La Rotonda" of Palladio), with the garden facade resembling a rusticated Tuscan palace, while on the hill below is a terraced porch with telamons sculpted by Pompeo Marchesi.

The art critic Cesare Cantù said of the building that it was a response to statements that Cagnola only built grandiose buildings because he was not spending his own money.

A chapel in the villa contains the cenotaph of Luigi Cagnola, a work by Francesco Somaini.

The building has passed through various hands. The widow of Cagnola married the Marquis D'Adda Salvaterra. After the Second World War it was acquired by the Fondazione Don Carlo Gnocchi, which served disabled children, including over the decades those mutilated by war, polio, or cerebral palsy. It continues to serve as "Santa Maria alla Rotonda", a facility for disabled children.
