= Giovanni Battista Comolli =

Italian sculptor (1775–1831)

- Born: 19 February 1775
- Died: 26 February 1831 (aged 56)
- Known for: Sculpture

Giovanni Battista Comolli (19 February 1775 – 26 December 1831) was an Italian sculptor.

He became a pupil of the Milanese sculptor Giuseppe Franchi at the Brera Academy, but was strongly influenced by Antonio Canova.

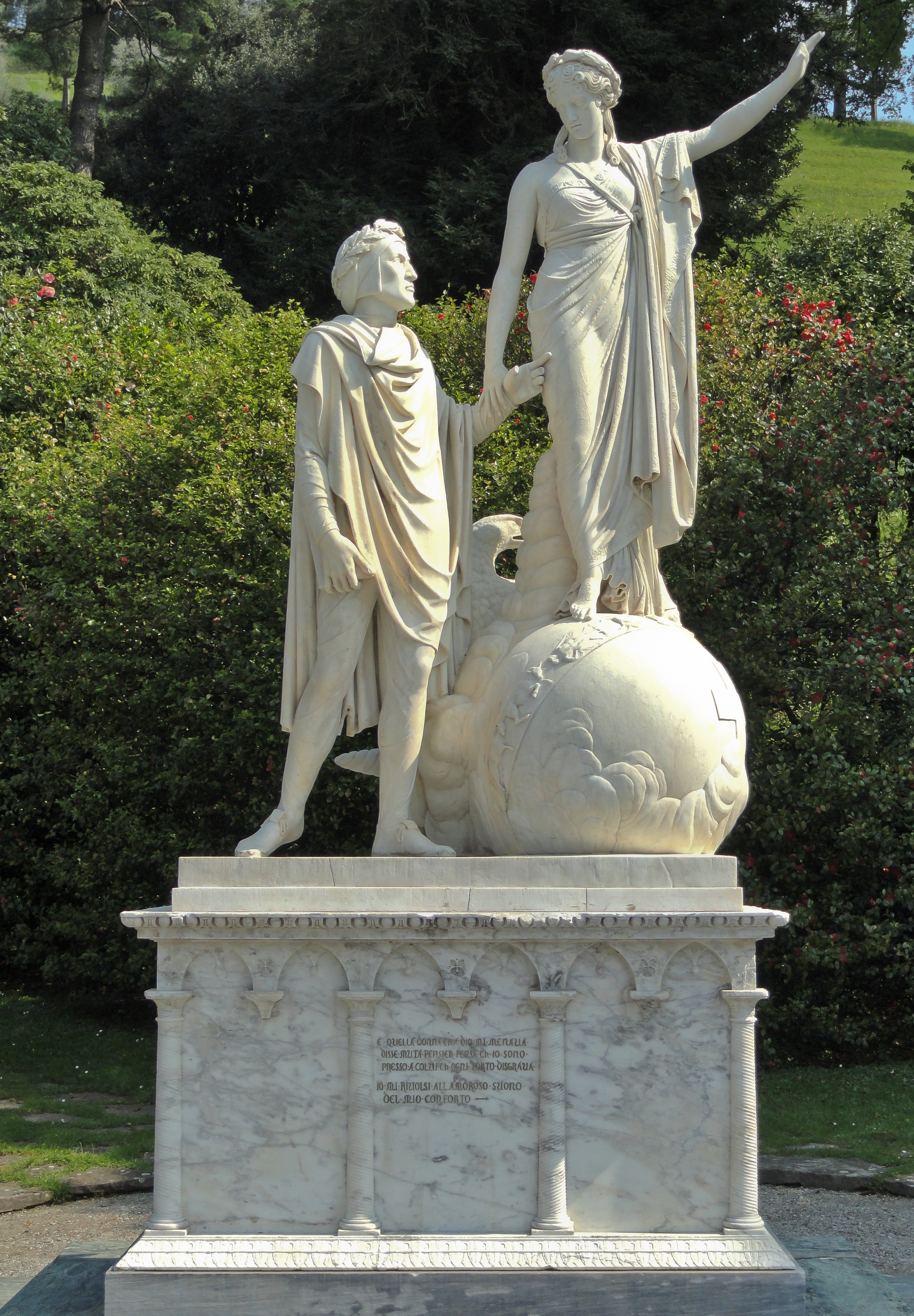
Dante and Beatrice (1813)

In 1798, he supported the revolution that led to the establishment of a brief Roman Republic. Upon this revolutionary failure, he fled to Grenoble. When the North of Italy was evacuated by the Austrian troops, he moved to Milan, and in 1800 was named Conservator of National studio of Sculpture. Over the next decade he moved around many times throughout the north of Italy, and to Paris, where he set up a studio for portrait busts. Among his work was a larger than life, hagiographic plaster statue of Napoleon the Peacemaker (1801). The statue while generating interest, was not commissioned in more lasting materials. Political problems caused him to move frequently. He then moves back to Grenoble and from there to Turin, where in 1802 he completes a series of busts of Napoleon, Jourdan, Brune, and Massena for the local atheneum. He was briefly named professor or sculpture of the Accademia Albertina of Turin. The production of busts and works for private patrons supported him.

After 1816 till about 1820, he moved to London, where despite his prior adulation of Napoleon, he was flattered with repeated commissions. There he made busts of Lord Fox, of the Duke of Gloucester, of the Marquis of Buckingham, of Thomas Grenville, and also completed the marble altar for the Catholic Church of St. Mary Moorfields, reconsecrated in London in 1820.

Around 1820, he returns to Milan. There he continued portraiture for patrons. This remained among his best works, often depicting the patrons with brio and nobility. Political troubles continued to plague him, including a spell in jail. He would travel frequently to France. In Italy, political problems led him to move periodically among cities of Northern Italy. He continued to make celebratory statuary and busts of Napoleon . Among his works are:

- The famous, though reactionary, outdoor sculptural group of Dante and Beatrice (1813) in the Villa Melzi at Bellagio, Lago di Como.
- Statue of The Redeemer for the chapel in Villa Melzi.
- Bust of Chaptal in Montpellier.
- Bust of Eugenio di Beauharnais in Versailles .
- Busts of Vincenzo Monti and Abbott Giovanni Battista Casti in Ambrosiana, Milan.
- A memorial remembering the Treaty of Campoformio in Udine.
- Statues of the campanile by Cagnola and Arc of Peace in Urgnano.
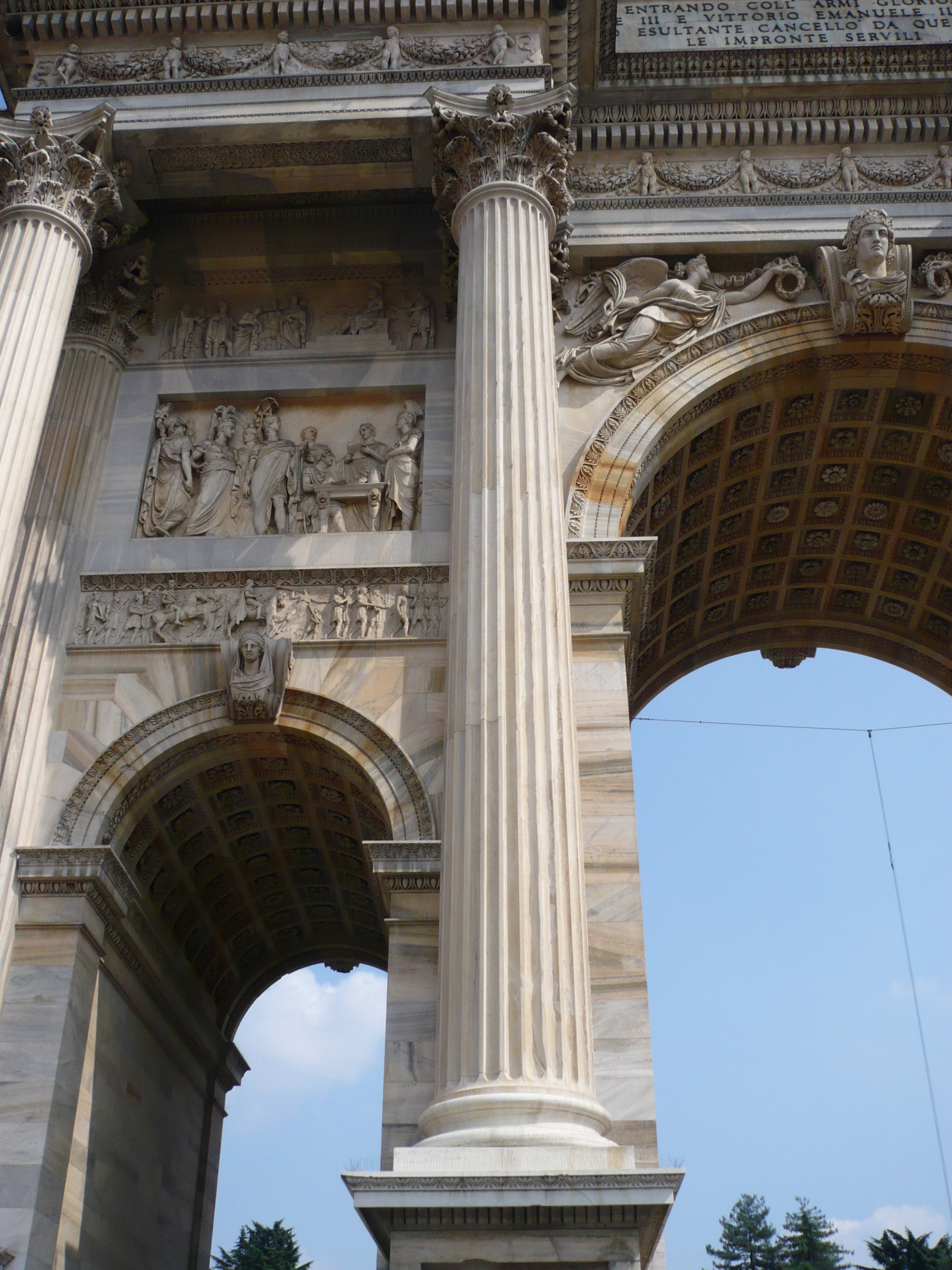
Arc of Peace in Milan

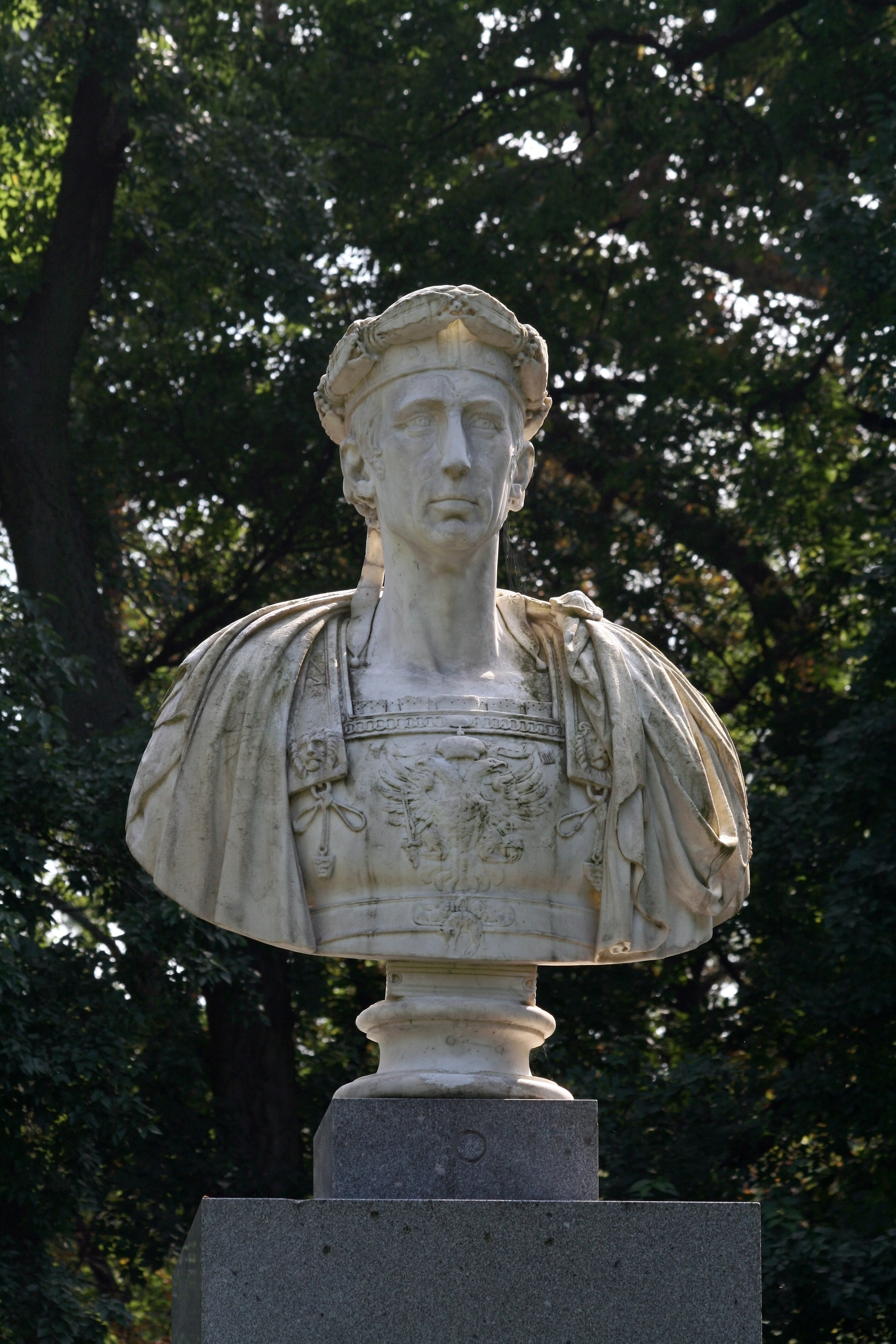
Francis II

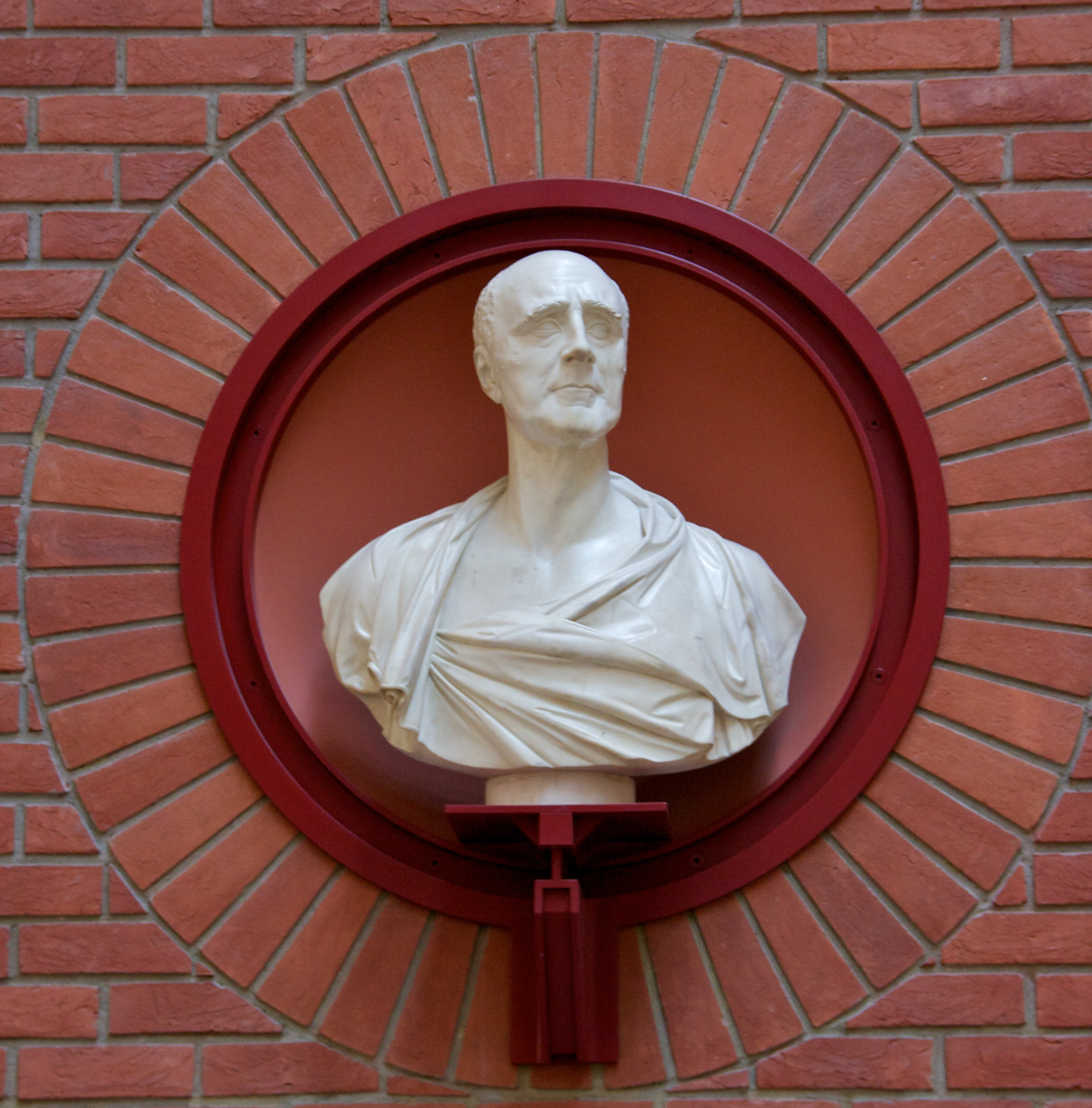
Thomas Grenville

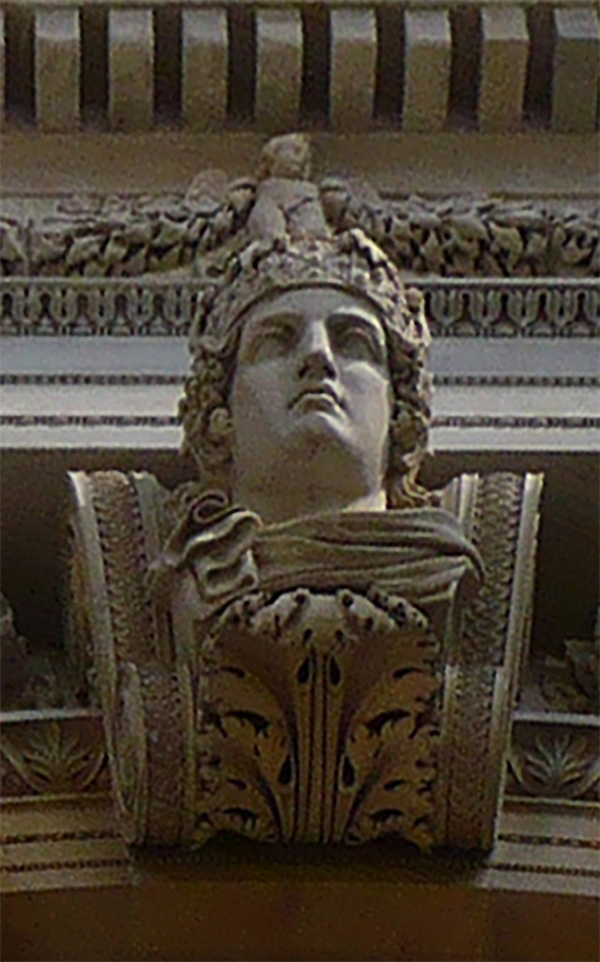
Arc of Peace in Milan - detail

== Sources ==
- Entry in Treccani Dictionary
