= Angelo Pizzi =

Sculptor

Angelo Pizzi (1775 – Venice, 1819) was an Italian sculptor, active in a Neoclassical style.

He was a pupil of Giuseppe Franchi. He completed the statues of Saints Matthew and Simon for the Duomo of Milan. He made a model for a colossal statue of Napoleon, held at the Brera Academy. He became a professor of sculpture in Carrara, and then in 1807 moved to Venice, and was a professor at the Accademia di Belle Arti di Venezia.
