= Neoclassical architecture in Milan =

18th- and 19th-century buildings in Milan

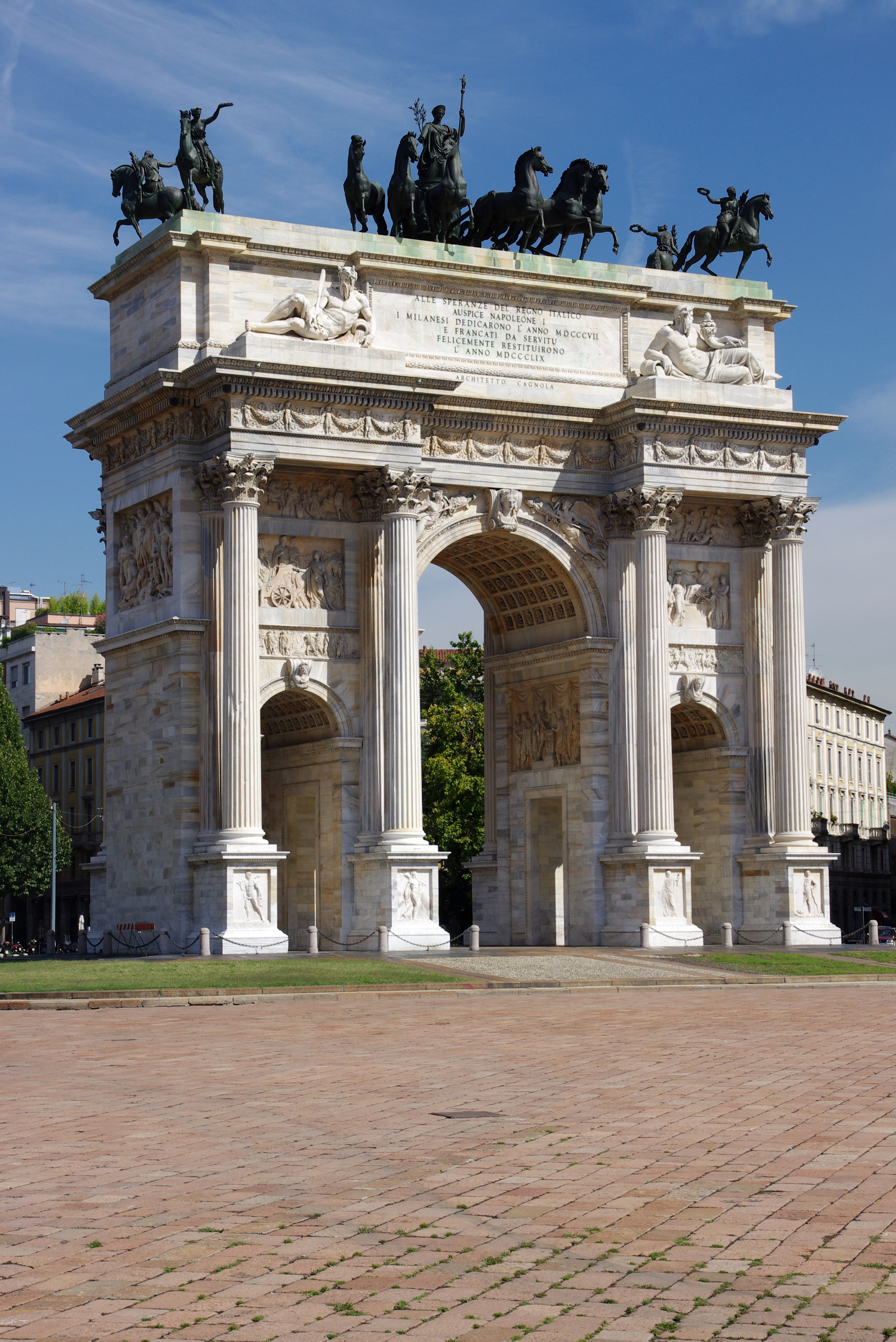
Arco della Pace, completed 1816

Neoclassical architecture in Milan encompasses the main artistic movement from about 1750 to 1850 in this northern Italian city. From the final years of the reign of Maria Theresa of Austria, through the Napoleonic Kingdom of Italy and the European Restoration, Milan was in the forefront of a strong cultural and economic renaissance in which Neoclassicism was the dominant style, creating in Milan some of the most influential works in this style in Italy and across Europe. Notable developments include construction of the Teatro alla Scala, the restyled Royal Palace, and the Brera institutions including the Academy of Fine Arts, the Braidense Library and the Brera Astronomical Observatory. Neoclassicism also led to the development of monumental city gates, new squares and boulevards, as well as public gardens and private mansions. Latterly, two churches, San Tomaso in Terramara and San Carlo al Corso, were completed in Neoclassical style before the period came to an end in the late 1830s.

== Overview ==
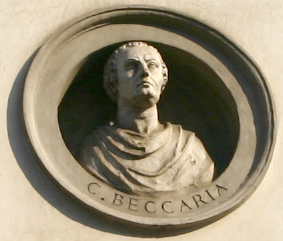
Neoclassical medallion of Cesare Beccaria at the Palazzo Brentani

In 1714, the Treaty of Rastatt formalized the transfer of Milan from Spanish to Austrian rule. During the reign of Maria Theresa (1740–1780) and Joseph II (1765–1790), the city led a cultural and economic renaissance. The empress and her son, strongly influenced by the ideals of Enlightenment, played a significant role in the movement for reform. Thanks to its enlightened government and reforms, Milan was open to developments from Europe, quickly becoming a lively intellectual centre. As a result, influential proponents of the new styles, such as Pietro and Alessandro Verri and Cesare Beccaria arose. It was also the seat of the forward-looking newspaper Il Caffè and of the Accademia dei Pugni. The reforms covered important areas of interest to the public, especially the modern system of land registry, one of the most efficient in Europe. Between 1765 and 1785, Joseph II reduced the powers of the religious orders. The inquisition was abolished, meetings of religious orders, including those of the Jesuits were forbidden and their assets were transferred to the city where they were used for unprecedented urban renewal programmes. Coordinated by the court architect Giuseppe Piermarini, Neoclassicism became the style of the city's rebirth. The first public parks were opened while elegant mansions inspired by the new trend were built in carefully selected areas. Some of Milan's most famous institutions such as the Teatro alla Scala, the Brera cultural centre and the reformed Palatine Schools were created during this period.

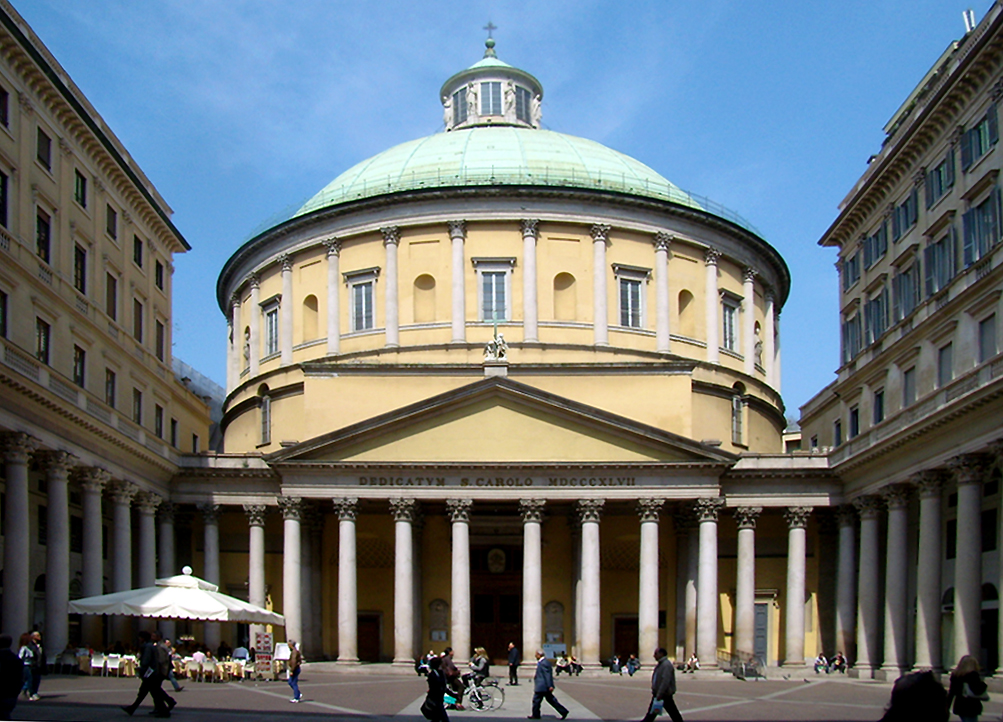
Square outside San Carlo al Corso

In 1796, with Napoleon's arrival in Italy, Archduke Ferdinand of Austria left the city which from 1800, came into the hands of the French. French domination did not deter Milan's cultural activities. The rapidly growing population included some of the greatest Italian intellectuals, from Melchiorre Gioia to Vincenzo Monti and Alessandro Volta to Ugo Foscolo and Silvio Pellico. The Lombard Institute of Science and Letters was founded and several newspapers were established in the city. For the capital of the Kingdom of Italy as it now became, numerous urban projects were prepared with a view to giving Milan the look of one of Europe's main capitals, although they were never completed. For some time the inhabitants had drawn up petitions for dismantling the Sforza Castle and by his decree of 23 June 1800, Napoleon ordered its demolition. This was indeed begun in 1801 but was never completed. The same year the architect Giovanni Antonio Antolini was charged with designing a "Foro Bonaparte" (Bonapart Forum) but instead he suggested remodeling the castle in the Neoclassical style. As a result of its high costs, the project was however shelved. By decree in 1807, Milan and Venice were endowed with a "Commissione di Ornato" (Embellishment Committee) with vast powers and a wide sphere of activity. It was made up of the most prominent figures in Milan. The first item to be discussed was a master plan which was drafted the same year. Until 1814, the city's development was governed by the plan which "can be considered one of the most modern plans created in Europe.".

With the return of the Austrians in 1815, the city completed its cultural and economic success. Commercial and financial activities made Milan Italy's main business centre. Furthermore, thanks to the completion of many irrigation projects coordinated by the government, Milanese agriculture was among the most modern and best developed in Europe. At the same time, the city became the largest publishing and cultural centre of Italy with the involvement of figures including Carlo Cattaneo, Cesare Cantù and Carlo Tenca. Milan developed Neoclassical works in both the private and public domains: firstly as a result of the strong link between the Enlightenment and Neoclassical art, especially publicly funded architecture, and secondly the role that architecture played in celebrating the Neoclassical revolution and Napoleon's exploits. They inevitably came to an end with the Restoration. Neoclassicism began a slow decline, passing through periods of Romanticism and Eclecticism but nevertheless leaving a great legacy. Indeed, during this flourishing period, the foundations were laid for Milan later to become the economic capital and, in certain periods, also the cultural capital of a united Italy.

== Characteristics ==
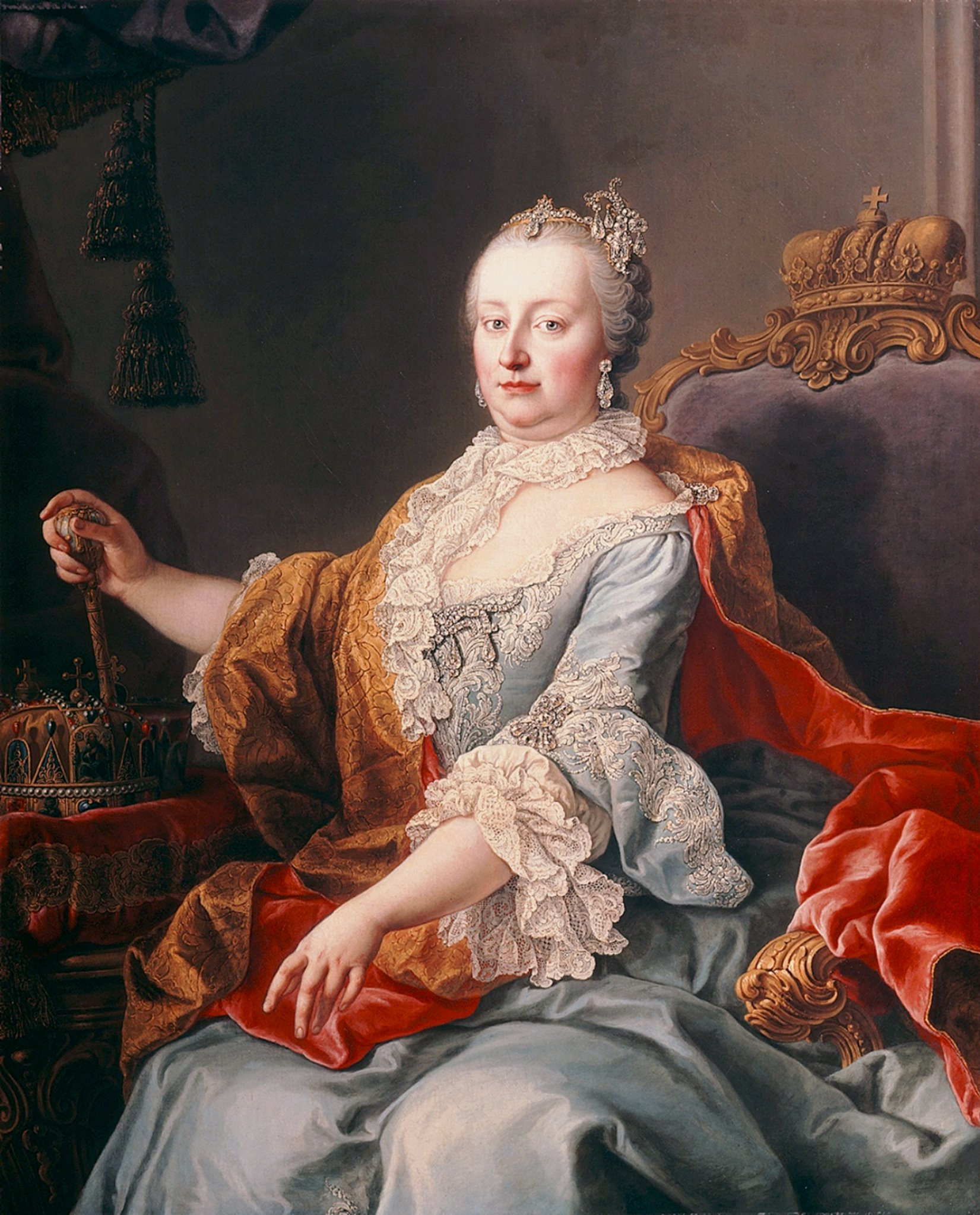
Maria Teresa, initiator of Milan's era of Enlightenment and Neoclassicism

The Neoclassical period in Milan can be divided into three phases corresponding to three historical periods for the city in the 18th and 19th centuries: the Austrian period of Enlightenment, the Napoleonic years, and the Restoration.

In Milan, Neoclassicism began a few years later than in its main European counterparts, mainly as a result of the problems of succession to the throne of the Austrian empire, with Maria Theresa's lengthy reign. Initially, Neoclassicism in Milan, like the artists who practiced it, was not so much inspired by the classical models of Ancient Rome or Roman Neoclassicism as by developments in London, Paris and Parma. It was a period of great public works covering theatres, libraries and schools, and more generally of important works for the public good, reflecting the ambitions of an enlightened government. It was a period in which the State and the government itself led the city's cultural life and progress, promoting and funding new activities and rewarding the most deserving citizens and achievements. During this initial period, Neoclassicism was characterized by a more sober and austere approach, resulting in symmetrical, well-ordered structures.

The Napoleonic period, while demonstrating some continuity in reinitiating work suspended under the Austrian government, was also characterized by a more monumental and celebratory style, striving to promote Milan as one of the great European capitals with Eclectic and Romantic architectural features. In particular, outstanding new roads and city gates were completed. There were plans for a considerable number of projects designed to enhance the appearance of the city and to celebrate the victories of Bonaparte. However, as a result of the short period of French rule and the over ambitious nature of some of the works, they were largely set aside.

With the Restoration and the return of the Austrians, there was something of a revival of the previous Neoclassical style, although the progressive approach of enlightened governments was now coming to an end. During this period, sculpture and painting took on a primary role, promoted by annual festivals and competitions. The State had a less secular approach than in the two previous periods, initiating work on the restoration and renewal of churches, especially their interiors. After the early years of the Restoration, pure Neoclassicism became more a style of the past. The work of many artists began to reveal trends towards the Romantic art which would follow a few years later. By the late 1830s, it could clearly be seen that the era of Milanese Neoclassicism had now come to an end.

== Major works ==
For the first time since the Renaissance, urban planning was designed to renew the city in its entirety. There was a clear break with earlier developments which had produced works of great artistic value but which were separated from each other and often built on the initiative of private individuals. The city's development was now rationally planned on the basis of strict criteria, always under the supervision of the Ornato Committee. Some of the works are remarkable in their own right for their high artistic or cultural value.

=== Royal Palace ===
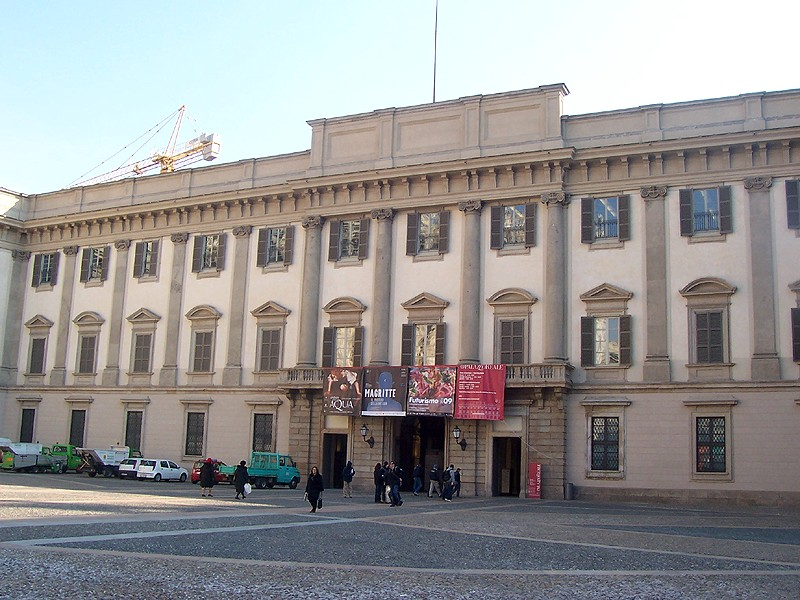
The Royal Palace as redesigned by Piermarini

When the Austrians arrived in Milan, the Royal Palace, the city's seat of power, was antiquated and totally unsuited to accommodate the court of a city destined to become the second largest in the Austrian Empire. On his own initiative, Archduke Ferdinand, Maria Theresa's son, strove to give the court a fitting seat. The new palace would bring prestige to the city while providing a suitable home for the court. The initial plans were for a new palace with a rectangular plan between the canals and the western city gate but it was later decided to restore the old palace. Luigi Vanvitelli, who was invited to coordinate the work, submitted three proposals which were all turned down owing to their high cost. In 1769, Vanvitelli entrusted the project to his young pupil Giuseppe Piermarini who gave the palace its present look.

Wishing to open up the square, Piermarini first demolished one of the old wings before concentrating on the renovation of the building's exterior. The result is a sober two-storey facade. The first floor contains windows with small stone cornices and a small bugnato ashlar socle while the other two have pilasters along the full length of the facade with tympanum windows, alternatingly triangular and curved. The interiors were then completely renewed. The entrance leads into the courtyard with its monumental Baroque staircase. To complete this part of the palace, the facade of the Church of San Gottardo in Corte had to be demolished while use was also made of the adjoining square. The most renowned artists, decorators and cabinet makers of the period were called upon to design the furniture and decorations. The external structure was completed in 1778 but work on the interior continued for several years.

=== Brera ===
In 1773, after the abolition of the order of the Jesuits, the city was able to make use of the Palazzo Brera where the order had been housed. It was decided it should be transformed from a religious structure into a public building. Several institutions were able to make use of the building. Within a few years, the Academy of Fine Arts and the Braidense Library were founded while the astronomical observatory, which was initially just moved into the palace, became the modern Brera Astronomical Observatory while the Brera Botanical Garden was established on the site of the Jesuits' herb garden. In 1774, Giuseppe Piermarini, who was entrusted with the renovation project, designed a new wing and provided a new facade with a monumental entrance flanked by Doric columns and surmounted by a balcony. Functional improvements were also carried out with alterations to the library, in order to cope with an increasing number of books, and with the addition of greenhouses in the garden. In 1784, the extensions were completed apart from a few minor tasks carried out by Leopoldo Pollack from Vienna.

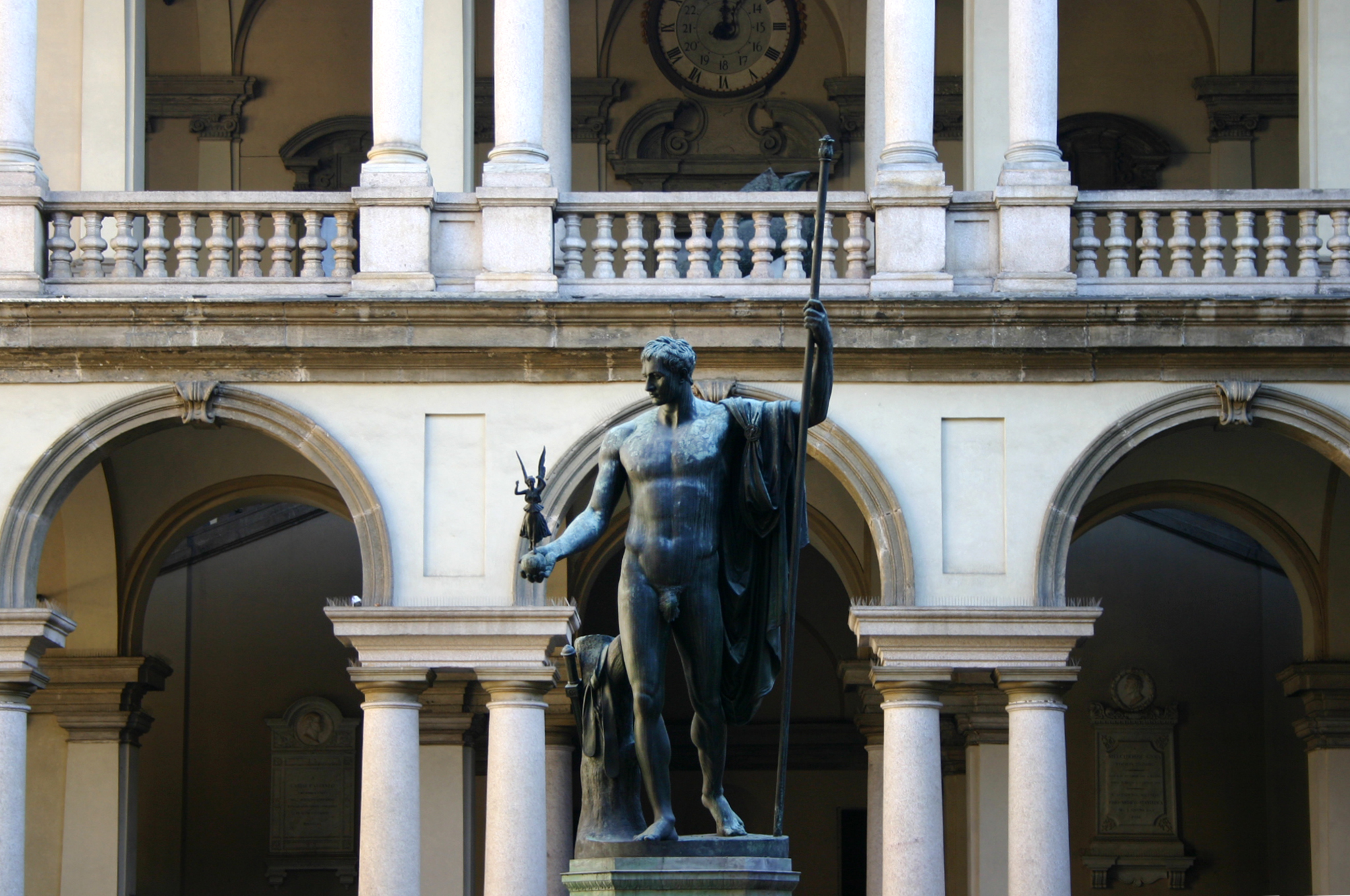
Statue of Napoleon in the Palazzo Brera courtyard

With the arrival of Napoleon, the fine arts academy officially became the National Academy with the foundation of the Pinacoteca di Brera gallery. In 1806, Pietro Gilardoni's plans provided more space for the gallery. In addition to new facilities for the observatory, space was made available for the Lombard Institute of Science and Letters while greenhouses were designed for the botanical garden. As part of the planning for additional space, the facade of the Church of Santa Maria in Brera was demolished and the interior was reworked in Neoclassical style in order to accommodate the Sale Napoleoniche or Napoleonic Hall. In 1811, the Righetti brothers created the bronze statue of Napoleon based on Antonio Canova's marble original which had been commissioned for the Palazzo del Senato. With the return of the Austrians, further changes were undertaken with a view to providing improved functionality and better educational facilities.

=== The Scala ===
In 1775, a fire had destroyed the Royal Theatre which was located in one of the palace wings. The boxholders association together with Archduke Ferdinand seized the opportunity to build a prestigious new theatre. Charged with its design in 1776, Giuseppe Piermarini immediately decided not to use the old site but rather the ground made available after the closure of the convent of Santa Maria della Scala, hence the name Teatro alla Scala. Brick rather than wood was chosen as the building material and the number of rows of boxes was increased to six. Additional rooms were included for various functions: there was a dance hall, a gaming room, workshops, cafes and restaurants. An extremely innovative feature, at least as far as Italian theatres were concerned, was the addition of an entrance for carriages. Access was further facilitated by widening the street now known as Santa Redegonda which had been a narrow old winding lane.

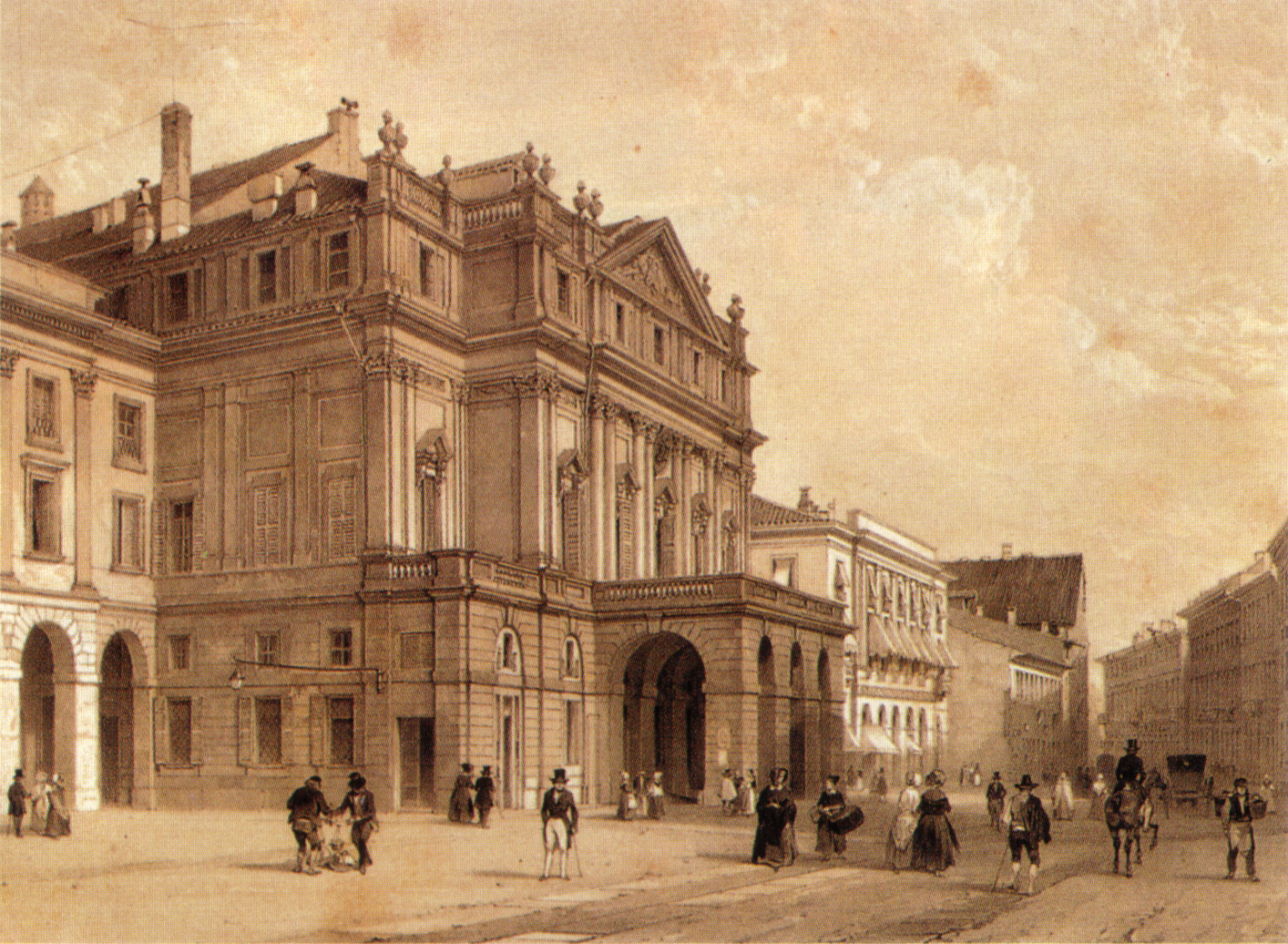
The Teatro alla Scala, 19th century print

The building was constructed in three sections to fulfill the established criteria. The first section, projecting outwards, had various workshops, cloakrooms and the foyer on the ground floor while upstairs it had a restaurant and a scenography studio. The second section housed the theatre proper. The boxes contained separate dressing rooms while the audience area was flat so that the hall could also be used as a ballroom. The third section, the stage, was designed in three sweeps with two lateral compartments large enough for backstage requirements. In his design for the horseshoe-shaped auditorium, Piermarini was inspired by the architecture of the Teatro di San Carlo in Naples but changed the degree of curvature so as to improve visibility and the acoustics. The acoustics were further enhanced by a number of subsequent modifications. For the ceiling, a finely decorated wooden facing served as a natural sounding board, ensuring almost perfect sound in every part of the hall. It was considered to be among the best of the times. Another little trick was to reduce significantly the size of the usually huge columns separating the various stages. For the hall's decor, Piermarini worked with prominent artists such as Giuseppe Levati and Giocondo Albertolli while also consulting the poet Giuseppe Parini. The theatre underwent many alterations during the Napoleonic period after which it lost its Neoclassical interiors as a result of work carried out by artists such as Francesco Hayez.

The front of the theatre was the part for which Piermarini showed most concern. The result can still be seen today. The lower level, in a granite bugnato ashlar, has a terrace with a three-arched porch while the upper level is decorated with a double row of columns crowned by an entablature. Finally the attic, with pilasters rather than columns, is surmounted by a series of torch-bearing vases. Its central pediment has a stucco bas-relief by Giuseppe Franchi representing the allegory of the chariot of the sun chased by the night. Dating from 1828, the body of the building beside the original structure was designed by the engineer Domenico Giusto. In 1858, after the demolition of several minor buildings, the Scala Square was completed, changing the view of the facade envisaged by Piermarini who had intended it to be seen from a much tighter perspective. Like much of the city, the theatre suffered during the allied bombing in the Second World War but was one of the first buildings to be repaired.

== Renovation of the ramparts ==
In the city's Neoclassical transformations, great importance was given to the renovation of the city wall which was no longer needed for defensive purposes. It was converted into scenic walkways while the former customs houses were redesigned as striking monuments.

=== The East Gate gardens ===
One of the most substantial developments was the area around the Porta Orientale, now known as the Porta Venezia. It was particularly important among the modernization works carried out by the Austrians as it was located on the road to Vienna. The city's first public gardens, now known as the Giardini Pubblici Indro Montanelli, were developed here.

Once again it was Giuseppe Permarini who was given the task of planning the gardens. They were initially intended to serve the new royal palace which was to be built in the area but when it was decided instead to renovate the existing palace, the development became part of the Public Gardens Plan. Now somewhat scaled down, the gardens were built in an area vacated by the removal of two convents and on land which had belonged to the Dugnani Elvetico family. A network of paths through the gardens and on to the adjacent streets included the Boschetti and the steps on the Via Vittorio Veneto which first led up to the ramparts and then into the park. Although the park's present appearance is mainly the result of replanning the park as an English garden at the end of the 19th century, Piermarini's Neoclassical influence is still in evidence on the path connecting the Boschetti to the steps down to the Via Vittorio Veneto. The site of one of the former convents was first redesigned as a venue for ball games and then used for city celebrations held by the governor Eugenio Beauharnais. It was finally demolished to provide space for the Milan's Natural History Museum (Museo di Storia Naturale).

Beside the Boschetti, there is another garden, that of the Villa Belgiojoso Bonaparte. The villa, a commission which Piermarini received from Count Barbiano, was entrusted to his student Leopoldo Pollack who in 1790 designed a building in the style of a Lombard villa with a rear facade overlooking the garden while the outside facade was profoundly different. The facade on the street was much simpler: the main section together with two lateral components contained the entrance court which was separated from the street by three arches supported by Ionic Columns. The central part was decorated with a slightly projecting loggia with Doric columns supporting a cornice and a balustrade decorated with statues of pagan gods. The facade overlooking the garden, much more carefully designed over two levels, has a ground floor in bugnato ashlar while the two upper floors feature Doric columns with separate windows free of gables but with cornices of mythological bas-reliefs. Here too, there are two less-protruding lateral sections, surmounted by triangular gables with bas-reliefs representing the allegories of Il carro del Giorno and Il carro della Notte. Like his master when decorating the Scala, Pollack was assisted by Giuseppe Parini in choosing the decoration themes but the innovative approach was that the villa was to be designed in accordance with the requirements of the surrounding English garden.

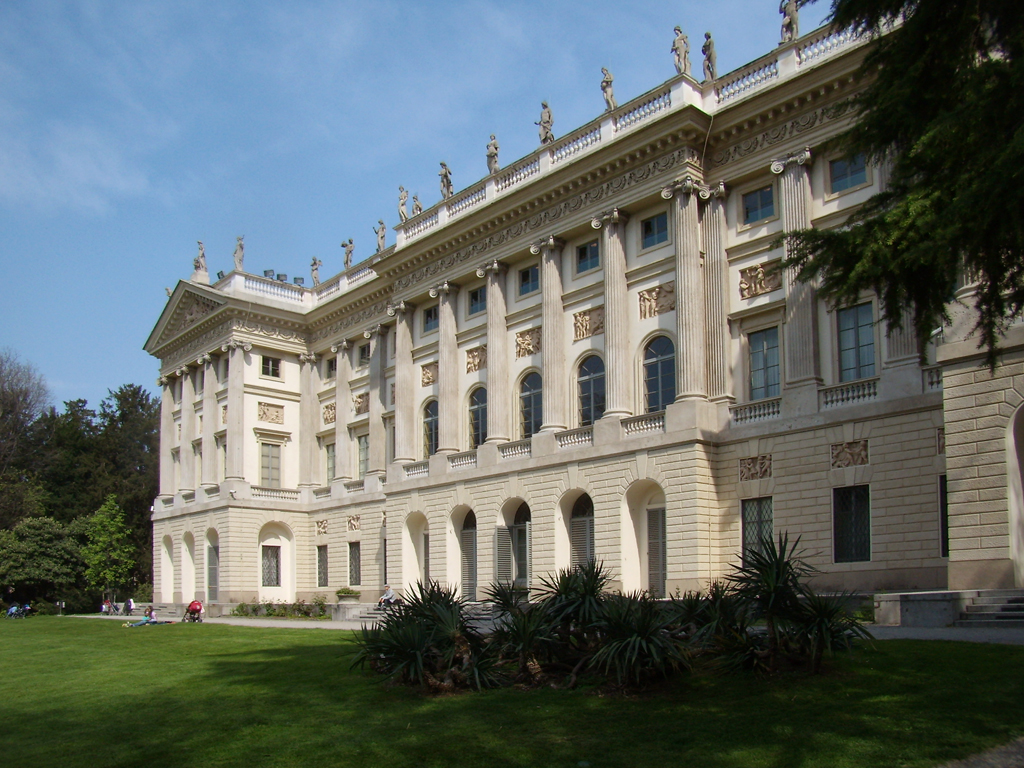
The Villa Reale facade facing the garden

Apart from some minor additions in the Romantic style, the interior is Neoclassical. Of particular note are the main hall on the first floor overlooking the garden and decorated with Corinthian columns and stucco, and the dining room with frescoes of Parnassus by Andrea Appiani from 1811. The park is the first example of an English garden in Milan. The plants were randomly arranged and the ground was heightened. Paths ran along streams and round a pond fed with water from a nearby canal. There was also a small mock ruin of a monopteros temple. During the Napoleonic period, the garden was used for celebrations and banquets. As the owner seldom used the building, it was soon sold by the Cisalpine Republic and donated to Napoleon who transferred it to the governor Eugenio Beauharnais and his wife. When the Austrians returned, the residence was used by the governors before it came under the ownership of the House of Savoy with the unification of Italy. The royal family often stayed there and, as a result, in 1921 the commune made it the home of the Gallery of Modern Art.

=== Ramparts and city gates ===
With the development of modern warfare, the walls of cities across Europe had become useless. As elsewhere, Milan began the demolition of its ramparts, replacing them with paths or simply empty space. The city gates, once the only entrances to the walled city, were torn down to make way for striking new structures inspired by the triumphal arches of Ancient Rome.

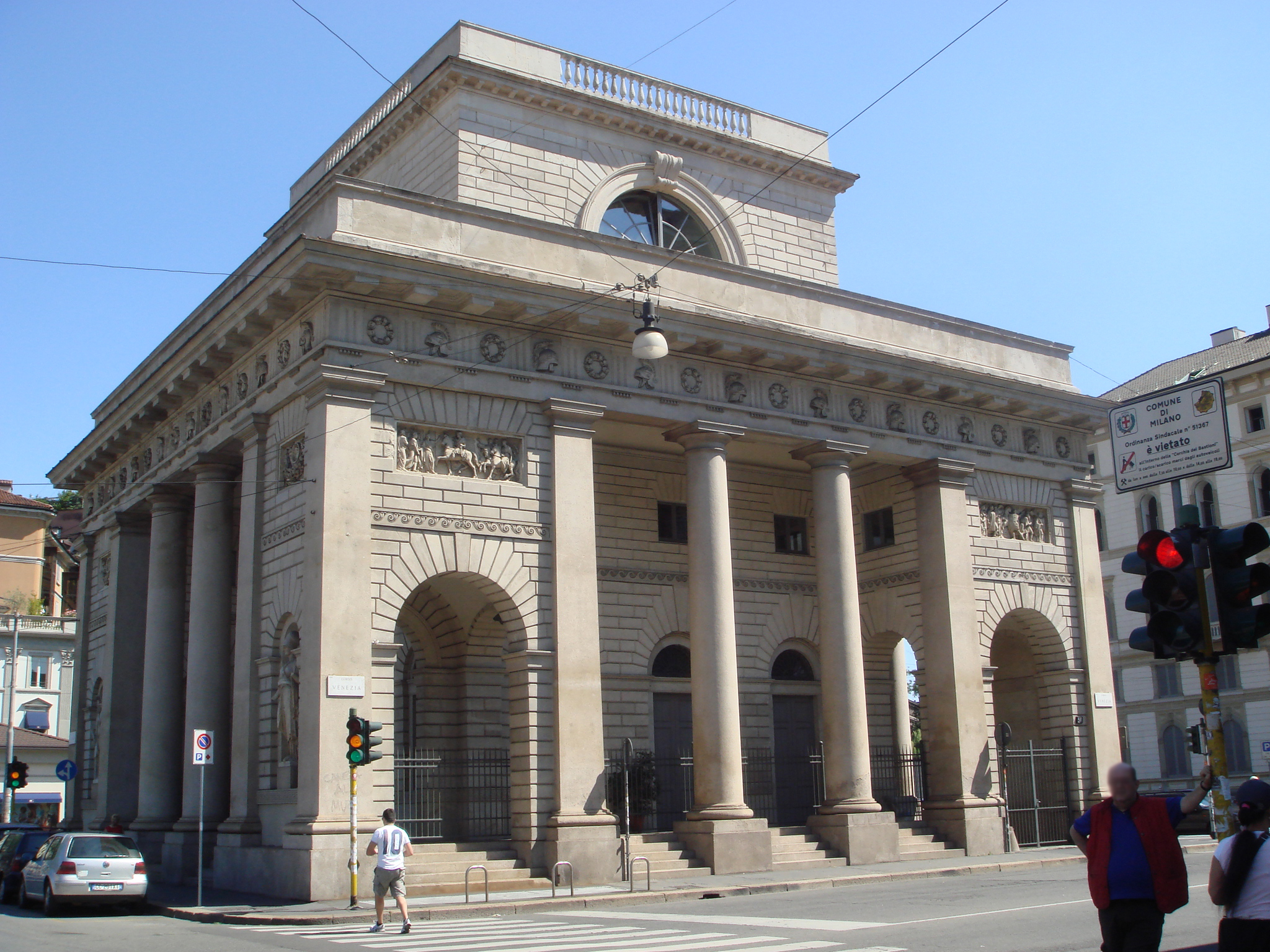
The Porta Venezia customs house

Of all the city gates and triumphal arches built during the Neoclassical period, the most famous and monumental is certainly the Arco della Pace. It was built during the Kingdom of Italy period at the end of the Corso Sempione road, the principal axis connecting the city to France under whose dependency the Kingdom came. Designed by Luigi Cagnola, construction began in 1805 only to be suspended a few years later. It was completed in 1816 at the instigation of Francis I of Austria. He called it the arch for European peace which had been achieved the previous year at the Congress of Vienna. The arch consists of three fornices with four giant order Corinthian columns. The entablature depicts allegories of the main rivers of the region, the Po, Ticino, Adige and Tagliamento, sculpted by Pompeo Marchesi. On top is a group of bronze sculptures from designs by Luigi Cagnola. The Chariot of Peace (Sestiga della Pace), representing Napoleon's victories, was originally designed to face the Corso Sempione but was later repositioned to overlook the city. Similarly, the arch's bas-reliefs were intended to depict Napoleon's exploits but when work began, under the influence of the Austrians, some of the scenes were changed to represent episodes from the Restoration and the Congress of Vienna while others depicting Napoleon were replaced with heads resembling Francis I. The customs offices on either side of the Arco della Pace date from 1838.

Quite differently designed by Piermarini in 1787 was the Porta Orientale, later renamed the Porta Venezia. Its two customs houses were completed by Rodolfo Vantini in 1828. Characterized by three Doric portals on the outer side facing the ramparts, they have a much more monumental look than the other customs houses in Milan and are also far more ornate. The decorations include Carrara marble statues and bas-reliefs with scenes from the history of Milan sculpted by various artists including Pompeo Marchesi and Gaetano Monti.

Not far from the Porta Venezia is the Porta Nuova, the work of Giuseppe Zanoia, completed in 1812 in a design inspired by Rome's Arch of Titus. The two customs offices have been integrated into the body of the arch. As sandstone was used for the project, the original decorations have been seriously worn. Nevertheless, some of the figures sculpted by Camillo Pacetti and Luigi Acquisti remain in excellent condition. Also in the vicinity is the single-arched Porta Garibaldi, until 1860 called the Porta Comasina, which was designed by Giacomo Moraglia in 1807. The customs houses were added in 1836. Its less monumental proportions are better suited to the surrounding streets as the gate was at the end of a road with several bends, hardly compatible with a grandiose project.

The far more imposing Porta Ticinese completed in 1817 is based on an even grander design by Luigi Cagnola. It has a rather simplistic appearance with symmetrical frontages towards the city and the countryside consisting of an Ionic peristasis supporting a triangular tympanum in pink Baveno granite. Initiated under French rule and completed under the Austrian Restoration, like the Arco della Pace it underwent a number of modifications. The name changed from Porta Marengo (in memory of the Battle of Marengo to its present name with an inscription calling for peace between nations. The Porta Vercellina, later named the Porta Magenta and demolished in 1885, was built and designed by Luigi Canonica in 1805 It was a triumphal arch with a single fornix flanked by two rows of Ionic columns and decorated with bas-reliefs in 1859.

== Neoclassical districts ==
From the mid 18th century, much of the city underwent a radical transformation, especially the streets. Under Austrian rule, the significance of the various axes changed with the result that many of the city's sinuous streets were rebuilt and frequently straightened out. These new axes led to the development of new districts with a considerable number of Neoclassical buildings, many of which can still be seen today.

=== Corso di Porta Orientale ===
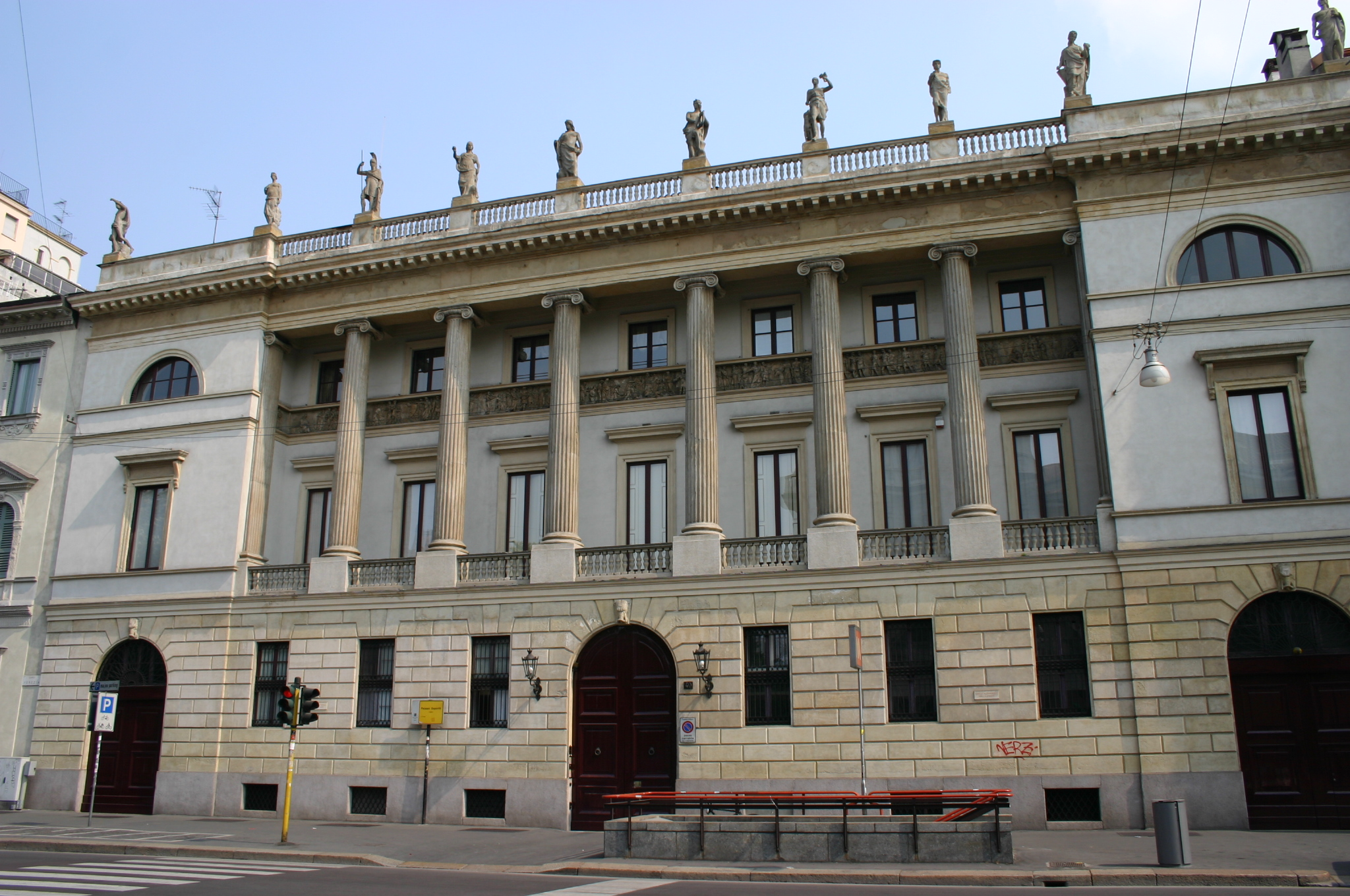
Facade of the Palazzo Saporiti

The district most affected by Neoclassical works was certainly the area surrounding the Porta Orientale. In addition to the monumental works described above, many private residences were built in the Neoclassical style. The main street through the district, also called the Porta Orientale quarter, was in fact the road linking Milan and Vienna. Located quite close to the city centre, with its convent parks and private gardens the district became popular for new buildings housing Milan's nobility.

The first building completed in the area was the Palazzo Serbelloni. Simone Cantoni received the commission from the renowned Serbelloni family. He opted for a rather sober style except for the central section consisting of a central portico with a parapet and giant order Ionic columns, all enclosed within two pilasters separating the monumental section from the facade of the less decorative part. A bas-relief depicting episodes from Milanese history divides the upper and lower floors. Inside, it is worth mentioning the great hall, decorated by Giocondo Albertolli and Giuseppe Maggiolini, used by Napoleon when he was in Milan, and the ballroom decorated by Giuliano Trabellesi.

Facing the gardens near the Palazzo Serbelloni and the customs houses is another perfect example of a Neoclassical residence, the Palazzo Saporiti. Commissioned by Gaetano Belloni, manager of the gaming room at the Scala, it was designed by Innocenzo Giusti. The building is a typical Neoclassical residence. On the ground floor level, the symmetrical facade is decorated with a bugnato ashlar in pink granite while the first floor features a portico with Ionic columns from which parades in the street below could be viewed. Between the first floor and the attic, there is a series of bas-reliefs depicting scenes from the history of Milan, while the attic itself is crowned with classical statues of the Dii Consentes sculpted by Pompeo Marchesi and Grazioso Rusca.

Other examples of Neoclassical residences include the Palazzo Bovara, home of the French embassy during the Cisalpine Republic and used by Stendhal during his lengthy stays in Milan, as well as the Palazzo Amati in the Via della Spiga. On a side street from the Corso Venezia, the aforementioned Villa Reale can be seen.

=== Del Monte district ===
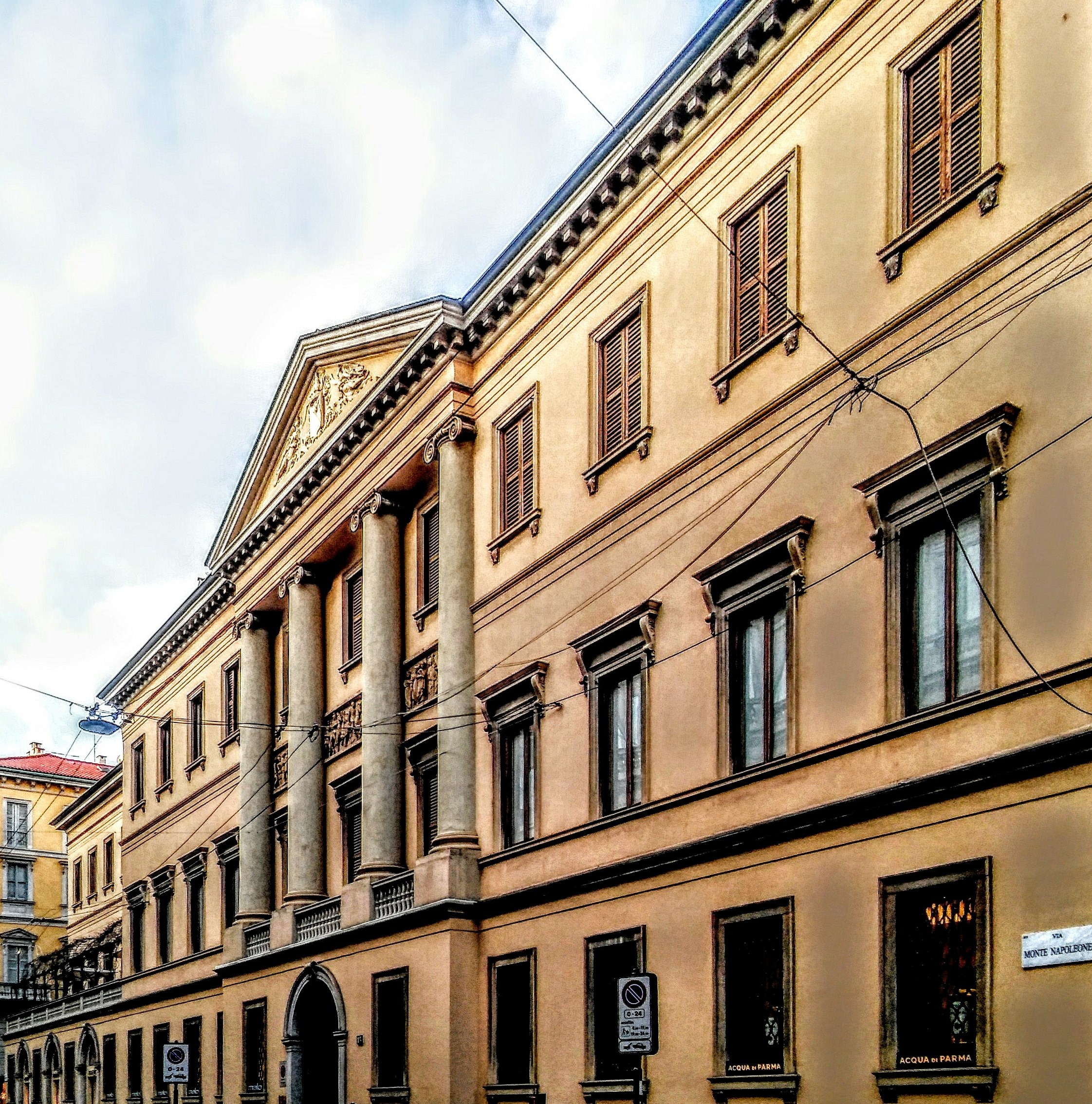
Palazzo Melzi di Cusano

In the early 19th century, the area around the Via Montenapoleone, a road which dates back to Roman times, was known as the Del Monte district. It was also modernized in accordance the trends of the times. Of the many buildings in the area, the one which most clearly reflects the Neoclassical style is certainly the Palazzo Melzi di Cusano built in 1830 by the engineer Giovanni Bareggi. The facade is obviously inspired by Simone Cantoni's Palazzo Serbelloni with a central section made up of giant Ionic columns surrounding a small portico surmounted by an entablature and a pediment decorated with bas-reliefs. Separating the lower and upper windows, there is a bas-relief by Gaetano Monti representing the "businesses" of Francesco Sforza. Still preserved inside the building are Neoclassical medallions depicting personalities of the period and a meeting room decorated with stucco and frescoes depicting scenes of Ancient Rome.

The Palazzo Taverna, a late Neoclassical building completed in 1835 by Ferdinando Albertolli, is notable in that it is reminiscent of the Royal Villa or, more generally, country houses as the main body of the building is set back to form a courtyard overlooking the street. The entrance consists of an Ionic colonnade supporting a parapet. The two lateral sections have giant pilasters surmounted by triangular tympani.

The Palazzo Gavazzi, typical of the mansions built during the Restoration period, was designed by Luigi Clerichetti in 1838. Each floor bears its own decorations: Doric columns on the ground floor and various pilasters on the first and second floors, rather than the huge decorative works which were popular at the time. The symmetrical facade is centred on a portal with four Ionic half-columns supporting the first-floor balcony. The residence was the home of Carlo Cattaneo.

=== Corsia dei Giardini and surroundings ===
Now called the Via Manzoni, this street was another artery where Neoclassical residences were completed after the nearby Scala Theatre brought new prestige to the area. It was not long before the street was favoured by the nobility for new homes.

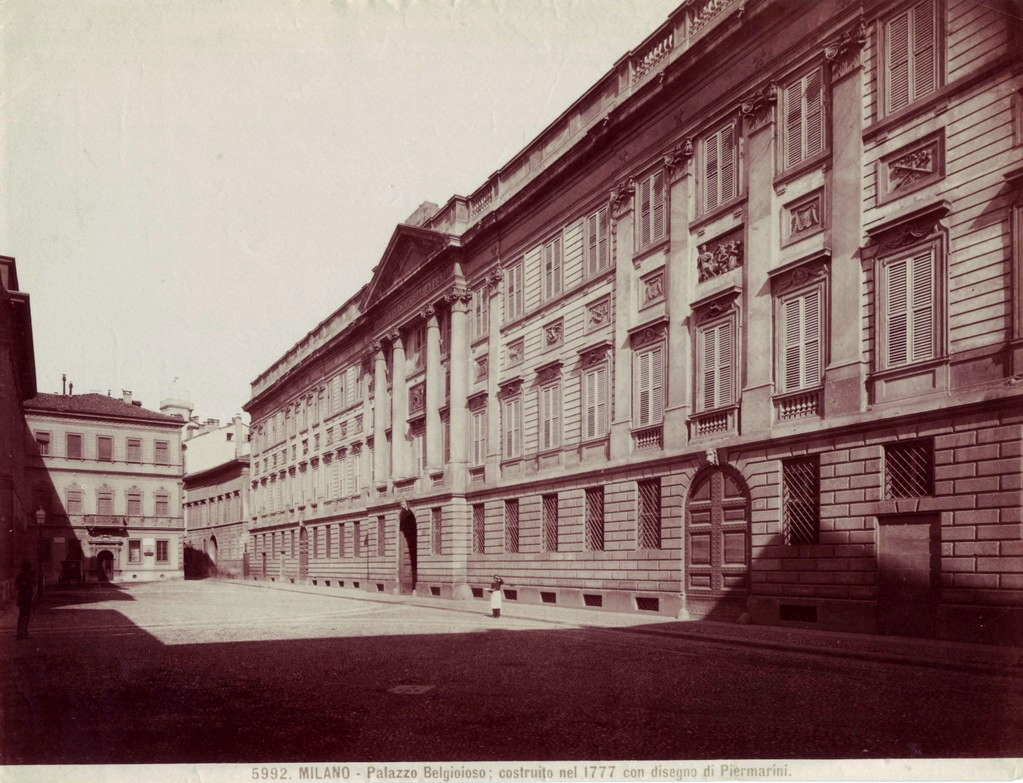
Old photograph of the Palazzo Belgioioso

Not directly on the street but a short distance away on one of the side streets stands the Palazzo Belgioioso, one of the masterpieces of Milan's Neoclassical architecture. The building is certainly one of the finest examples of the Neoclassical citizens' residences and was a haunt of Milan's intellectuals. It was designed in 1772 by Giuseppe Piermarini who in this instance abandoned the sober and austere style of early Neoclassicism, building an imposing and highly decorated mansion which dominates the street. Here too, the most lavishly decorated part of the facade is the slightly protruding central section with a series of four giant columns, an entablature and a tympanum enclosed by pilasters. The ground floor is finished in rusticated bugnato ashlar, the first floor, separated from the second with bas-reliefs of heraldic symbols, has windows crowned with garlands and decorative mouldings. Some of the rooms still have period decorations, the most famous of which are the gallery decorated with frescoes by Martin Knoller and stuccos by Giocondo Albertolli. Rinaldo's room, also decorated by Knoller, was inspired by Torquato Tasso's epic poem Jerusalem Delivered.

Opposite the Palazzo Belgioioso, is the less impressive Palazzo Besana whose Palladian facade consists of eight Ionic columns.

At 10 Via Manzoni, the Anguissola Antona Traversi constructed between 1775 and 1778 with particular attention to the interior garden, soon changed hands and in 1829 the exterior was reworked by Luigi Canonica who gave it the finish it maintains today. More ornate than most Milanese Neoclassical buildings, the facade consists of Corinthian pilasters terminating in a frieze with a musical relief clearly inspired by the nearby Scala. The ground floor is however faced with smooth blocks of granite.

Also on the Via Manzoni, Canonica's Palazzo Brentani has a sober Neoclassical facade with medallions of illustrious Italians. The more austere Palazzo Borromeo d'Adda is from the late Neoclassical period. On the continuation of the Via Manzoni, in the old Contrada della Cavalchina, stands the Palazzo Melzi d'Eril, once known for its private garden, said to have been one of the most beautiful in Milan. As a result of successive subdivisions, it was lost in the 1930s.

=== Corsia dei Servi and surroundings ===
The Corsia dei Servi, now the Corso Vittorio Emanuele II, was the site of significant Neoclassical renovations after the Restoration. The developments were mainly private although they were regulated by the Ornato Commission. Today, a small section of the street still retains its Neoclassical look although the area underwent a series of changes over the following century, finally suffering bombings during the Second World War and subsequent reconstruction.

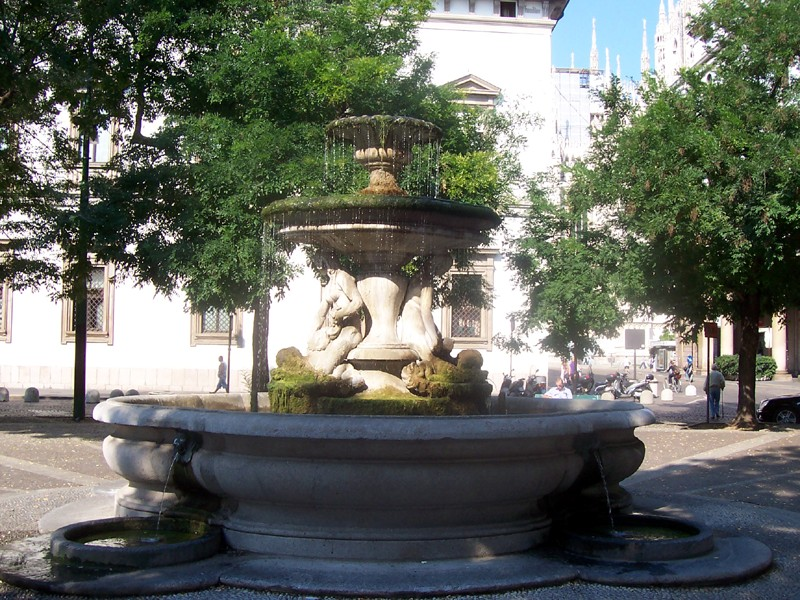
The Piermarini fountain

A rather unusual occurrence in Milan's artistic development was the reworking of the Piazzo del'Antico Verziere, the fruit market, which was centred around the construction of a fountain. It was completed in 1781 by the sculptor Giuseppe Franchi to a design by Piermarini with statues of mermaids and dolphins. Strangely, the square was never given a proper name, simply being called the Piazza Fontana (Fountain Square). The square was completed by the reconstruction of the facade of the Archbishop's Palace in 1784, again assigned to Piermarini. Keeping the old portal designed by Pellegrino Tibaldi, he simply added square windows, crowned with triangular tympani on the first floor, and added a new socle on the ground floor while creating a string course on the first floor.

Among the few remaining Neoclassical residences is the Palazzo Tarsis built by Luigi Clerichetti between 1836 and 1838. With a ground floor faced in rusticated bugnato, the first floor has a portico of Corinthian columns while the top floor, subsequently heightened, presents statues by Pompeo Marchesi.

The street is also the site of San Carlo al Corso (Milan) which is described below. Its construction in 1839 was later seen to coincide with the end of Milan's Neoclassical period.

== Religious buildings ==
As already explained, the first two Neoclassical periods were almost completely devoted to the construction of secular buildings. Religious developments during the reign of Maria Theresa and the Napoleonic period were limited to alterations to the interiors of existing churches. The only significant religious works therefore belong to the Restoration phase when the Congress of Vienna brought about a rapprochement between church and state. Two sites exist, each modelled on two classical designs, one based on a rectangular Greek temple with a porch, the other with a central plan inspired by the Pantheon in Rome.

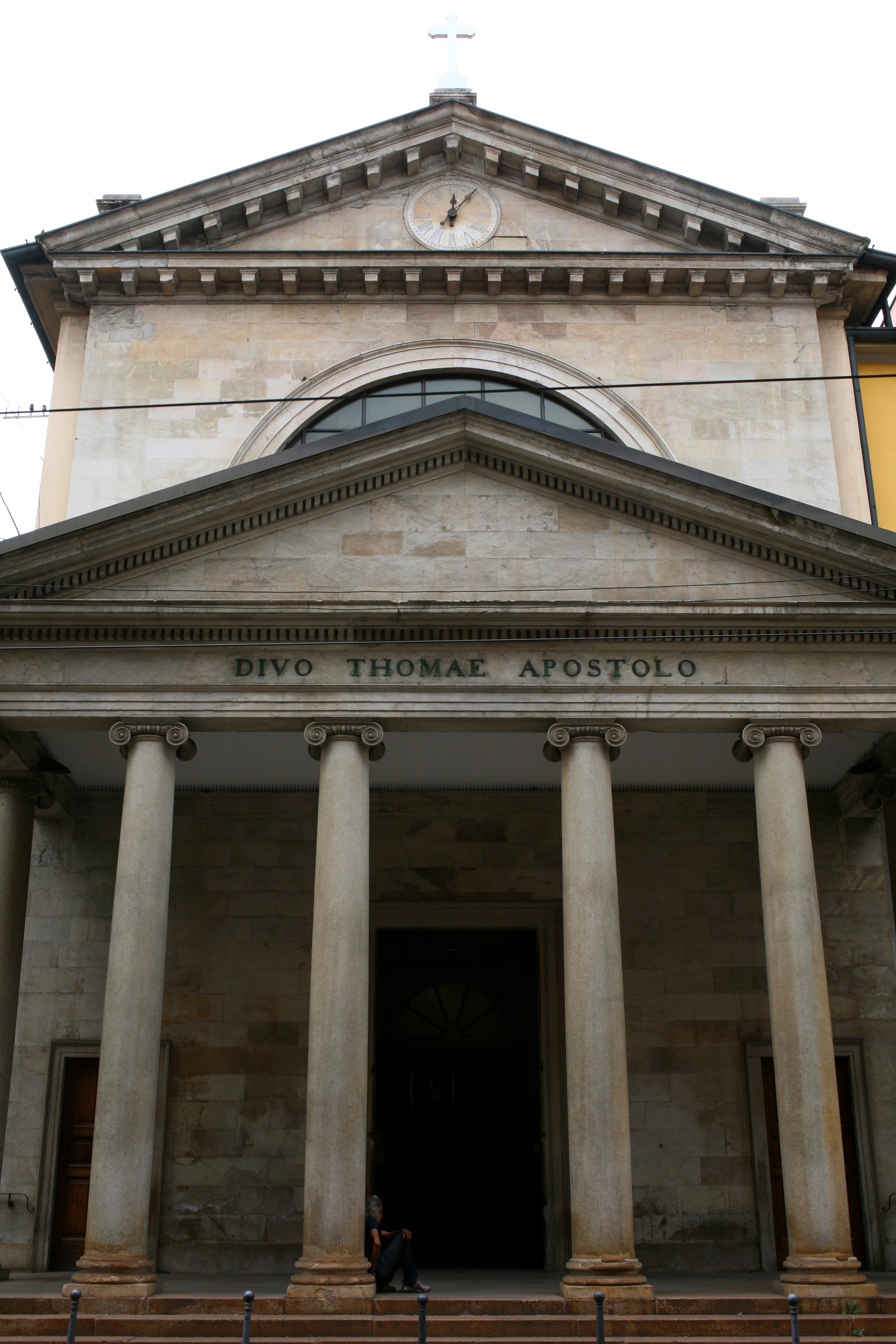
The facade of San Tomaso in Terramara

The Greek example is the church of San Tomaso in Terramara which had existed since the 11th century but whose appearance was completely changed between 1825 and 1827. The facade is made up of a portico of six Ionic columns supporting a triangular pediment which partly hides a semicircular window.

The Roman design is that of San Carlo al Corso built in 1839 by Carlo Amati, the city's largest church of the period. Built to a centrally-planned design, it has a typical gable-tympanum front with Corinthian half-columns and alternating niches and windows. The church forms part of a portical-lined square resulting from the demolition of the old Santa Maria dei Servi convent.

Despite its imposing appearance, the diameter is in fact a little less than that of the Pantheon, a factor which led to considerable criticism of the architect. The interiors are richly decorated in a pure Neoclassical style with groups of statues by Pompeo Marchesi and frescoes by Angelo Inganni. The impressive hemispherical dome has a coffered ceiling.

The church is the city's last major Neoclassical project. Even as the building was being completed, new architectural styles had already begun to emerge. For example, the Cristoforis Gallery with its glass and wrought iron facing was completed in 1832. Thus, apart from a few minor eclectic works, San Carlo al Corso can be said to be the city's last Neoclassical venture. The minor works include the church of Sant'Antonio Abate, the facade and the interiors of San Gottardo in Corte and, above all, Andrea Appiani's frescoes in Santa Maria presso San Celso.

== Unrealized projects ==
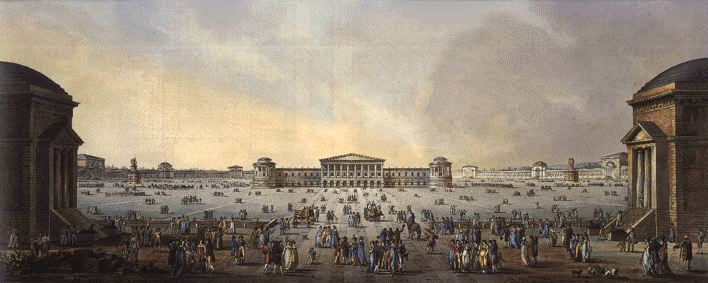
Antolini's sketch of the planned circular Foro Bonaparte

During Milan's second period of Neoclassicism, architects were charged with giving Milan the look of the new capital cities emerging in Europe. By far the most ambitious project was the Foro Bonaparte, planned in 1801 by Giovanni Antolini. Inspired by the Roman Forum and by the works of the French architect Claude Nicolas Ledoux, plans were drawn up for a development in the vicinity of Sforza Castle consisting of a circular piazza with a diameter of some 500 metres bordered by administrative buildings, ministries, court houses, baths, theatres, universities and museums. There were also plans for large areas to be devoted to commerce, the stores being connected through a system of canals to the city's Navigli. The main objective of the ambitious project was to move the city centre from the Piazza del Duomo, then surrounded by narrow medieval streets, to the newly planned Foro which would thus become the hub of city life. Evaluated and modified several times by a special commission, the plans finally shelved owing to the sheer grandeur of the project. Although Napoleon was strongly behind it, it was finally deemed too ambitious for a city the size of Milan. The Foro Bonaparte plans were however not completely abandoned: once Antolini's design had been set aside, the project was entrusted to Luigi Canonica who completely reworked it into developing the area essentially for private residences. Antolini's original plans were however considered to be one of the most important endeavors of Neoclassical architecture, so much so that the Foro Bonaparte was soon to inspire Naples' semicircular Piazza del Plebiscito with the church of San Francesco di Paola.

In addition to the ambitious Foro Bonaparte project, there were also plans for an important development near the Corso di Porta Ticinese. Entrusted to Cagnola in 1801, the project covered a monumental gateway in today's Piazza XXIV Maggio, straightening the Corso di Porta Ticinese, creating buildings with arcades along the road and constructing a monumental bridge over the canal. Here too the project was deemed too burdensome. The only outcome was a modified Porta Ticinese.

As for other unrealized works, a committee including Cagnola and Canonica, drew up a further plan around the early Neoclassical styles. The Brera Academy published open competitions for an orphanage (1805), a school (1806), a covered market (1808), an art gallery (1810), a prison (1811), public baths (1812) and a cemetery (1816). As a result of the end of the Kingdom of Italy (1805–1814) and the termination of regulatory planning, the works were never completed.

== See also ==
- Neoclassical architecture
- Architecture of Milan
- History of architecture and art in Milan

== Bibliography ==
- Gianni Mezzanotte, Architettura neoclassica in Lombardia, 1966, Napoli, Edizioni scientifiche italiane (in Italian)
- Etienne Dalmasso, Milano Capitale economica d'Italia, 1972, Milan, Franco Angeli Editore (in Italian)
- Aldo Rossi, Scritti scelti sull'architettura e la città 1956 – 1972, 1975, Milan, Clup
- Aldo Rossi, L'architettura della città, 1978, Milan, Clup (in Italian)
- Attila Lanza and Marilea Somarè, Milano e i suoi palazzi: porta Vercellina, Comasina e Nuova, 1993, Vimercate, Libreria Meravigli editrice (in Italian)
- Micaela Pisaroni, Il neoclassicismo – Itinerari di Milano e Provincia, 1999, Como, NodoLibri (in Italian)
- Giovanni Curcio and Elisabeth Kieven, Storia dell'architettura italiana – Il Settecento, 2000, Milan, Electa Monadori (in Italian)
- Fernando Mazzocca, Alessandro Morandotti and Enrico Colle, Milano Neoclassica, 2001, Milan, Longanesi & C. (in Italian)
- AA.VV, Touring Club Italiano: Guida d'Italia – Milano (TCI rosso), 2003, Touring Club Editore, Guide rosse d'Italia (in Italian)
- Marco Dezzi Bardeschi, Milano: architettura, città, paesaggi, 2006, Milan, Mancosu Editore (in Italian)
- AA.VV, La storia dell'arte, 2006, Milan, Electa Mondadori (in Italian)
