= Grazioso Rusca =

Swiss sculptor

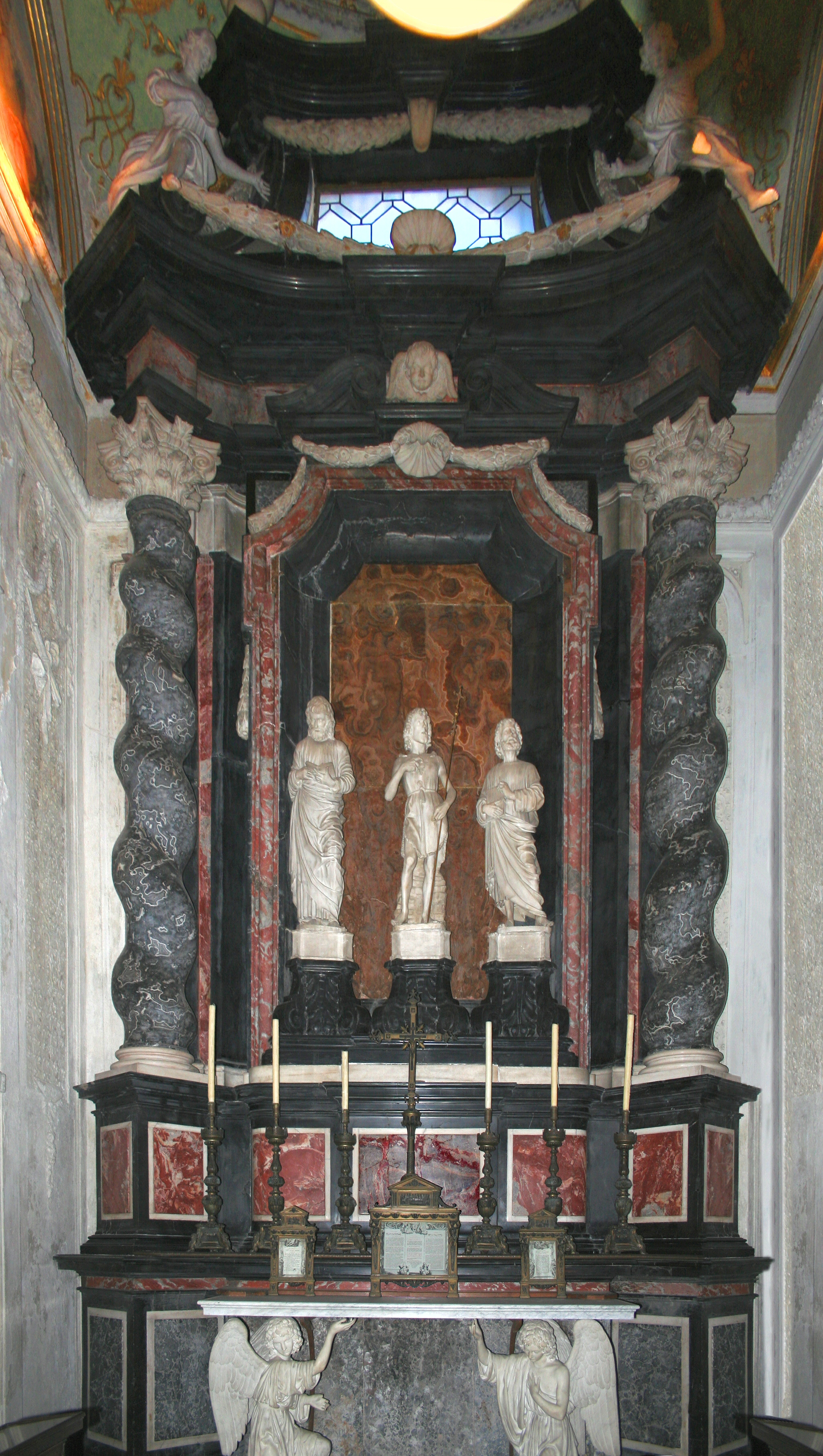
Rusca's statues bearing the altar table, Cappella Colleoni, Bergamo

Grazioso Rusca (1757 – 18 June 1829) was a Swiss sculptor who was also active in northern Italy.

== Biography ==
Originally from Rancate in the Swiss canton of Ticino, he was trained as a stonemason by architects including Simone Cantoni. He worked at the Veneranda Fabbrica del Duomo di Milano in Milan where he created reliefs for the cathedral's facade. In the 1880s, he worked with Austrian architect Leopold Pollack at the College of Pavia, creating two large statues representing Philosophy and Theology. From 1796 to 1797, his decorations for the Palazzo Belgioioso included bas-reliefs depicting Napoleon as Hercules helping Italy.

In Bergamo's Cappella Colleoni, he sculpted the two angels supporting Pollack's altar table. Again working with Pollack in Bergamo, he decorated the high altar at Santa Maria Maggiore and created the bas-reliefs of Apollo and the muses at the Palazzo Agosti. In 1805, he replaced Carlo Maria Giudici at the Fabbrica del Duomo, earning him a position of great prestige as head of one of the major sculpture workshops of the times. His son, Gerolamo and his nephew Antonio also were employed by the Fabbrica del Duomo.

== Selected works ==
- Madonna del Rosario, San Bernardino, Milan
- High altar statue, Santa Maria Nuova, Milan
- Statua della Pace (1802), Cremona
- Dii Consentes (c. 1812), Palazzo Saporiti, Milan
- Sculptural decorations, Arco della Pace, Milan
- Statue of the Redeemer, Santa Maria del Carmine, Milan
- St Augustin and the child on the beach, Basilica of San Gaudenzio, Novara

== See also ==
- Neoclassical architecture in Milan

== Bibliography ==
- Luigi Angelini, L'Arte Neoclassica in Bergamo. Gli interni del Palazzo Maffeis ora De Beni in via Pignolo 74, in La Rivista di Bergamo, July 1965, 3.
- Giuseppe Martinola, Inventario d'arte del Mendrisiotto, I, Edizioni dello Stato, Bellinzona 1975, 433–440.
- R. Ferrante, Palazzi nobili di Bergamo, Bergamo 1988, 106.
