= Palazzo Saporiti =

Historic Neoclassical palace in the centre of the north Italian city of Milan

Coordinates: 45.471845°N 9.20244°E

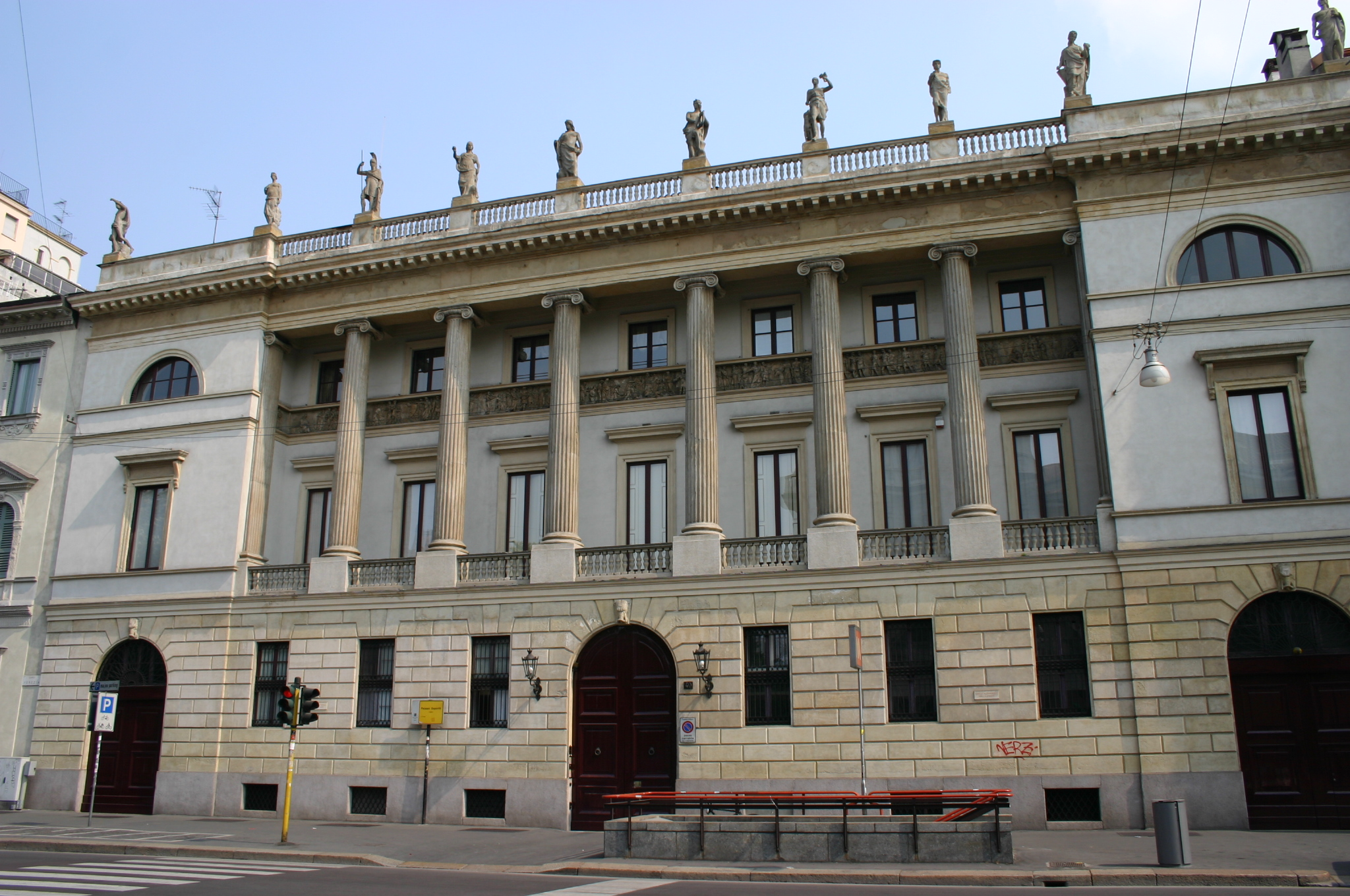
Palazzo Saporiti, Milan

The Palazzo Saporiti, also known as Palazzo Rocca-Saporiti, is a historic Neoclassical palace in the centre of the north Italian city of Milan.

== History ==
The palazzo was commissioned in 1800 by Gaetano Belloni who managed the gaming room at La Scala. However, as a result of the prohibition of gambling in the Napoleonic era, he was forced to sell the residence to the Marquis Rocca Saporiti from Genoa. The palace was built as part of a redevelopment project in the vicinity of the Porta Orientale on land which had belonged to the Capuchin Friars until their order was dissolved by the Austrian administration.

Completed in 1812, the project was said to have been designed by Innocenzo Giusti but it was in fact the work of Giovanni Perego, the Scala's famous scenographer, who was not officially entitled to handle the commission as he was not a professional architect. The building currently houses a Swiss bank.

== Description ==
The building's Neoclassical style is clearly inspired by Andrea Palladio. The predominant feature of the facade is the Ionic colonnade with its spectacular portico from which processions through the street below could be viewed. The ground floor has a bugnato finish while the main entrance is surmounted by a heraldic elephant. Between the first and second floors of the palace, a frieze depicts episodes from the history of Milan. Crowning the attic, there is a balustrade with six statues depicting the Dii Consentes sculpted by Pompeo Marchesi and Grazioso Rusca.

== See also ==
- Neoclassical architecture in Milan
