= Palazzo Taverna, Milan =

Palace in Milan, Italy

Coordinates: 45.466894°N 9.196735°E

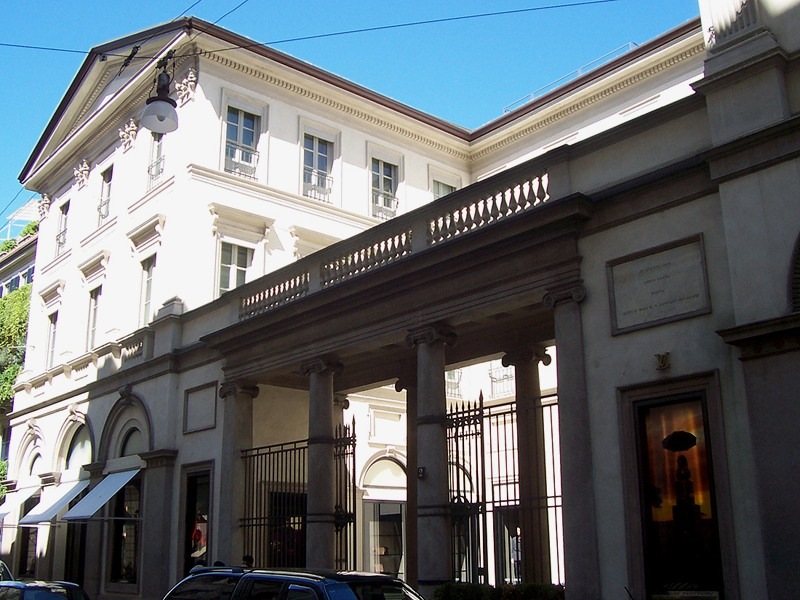
Milan - Via Montenapoleone

The Palazzo Taverna is a late Neoclassical palace in Milan, Italy, designed by Ferdinando Albertolli in 1835. It is located at 2, Via Montenapoleone, in the Porta Nuova district of the city.

The building is notable in that it is reminiscent of Milan's Royal Villa and of country houses in general as the main body of the building is set back to form a courtyard next to the street. The entrance consists of an Ionic colonnade supporting a parapet. The two lateral sections have giant pilasters surmounted by triangular tympani.

Today the palace houses a Louis Vuitton store.

== See also ==
- Neoclassical architecture in Milan
