= San Tomaso in Terramara =

Church in Milan, Italy

Coordinates: 45°27′56″N 9°10′53″E

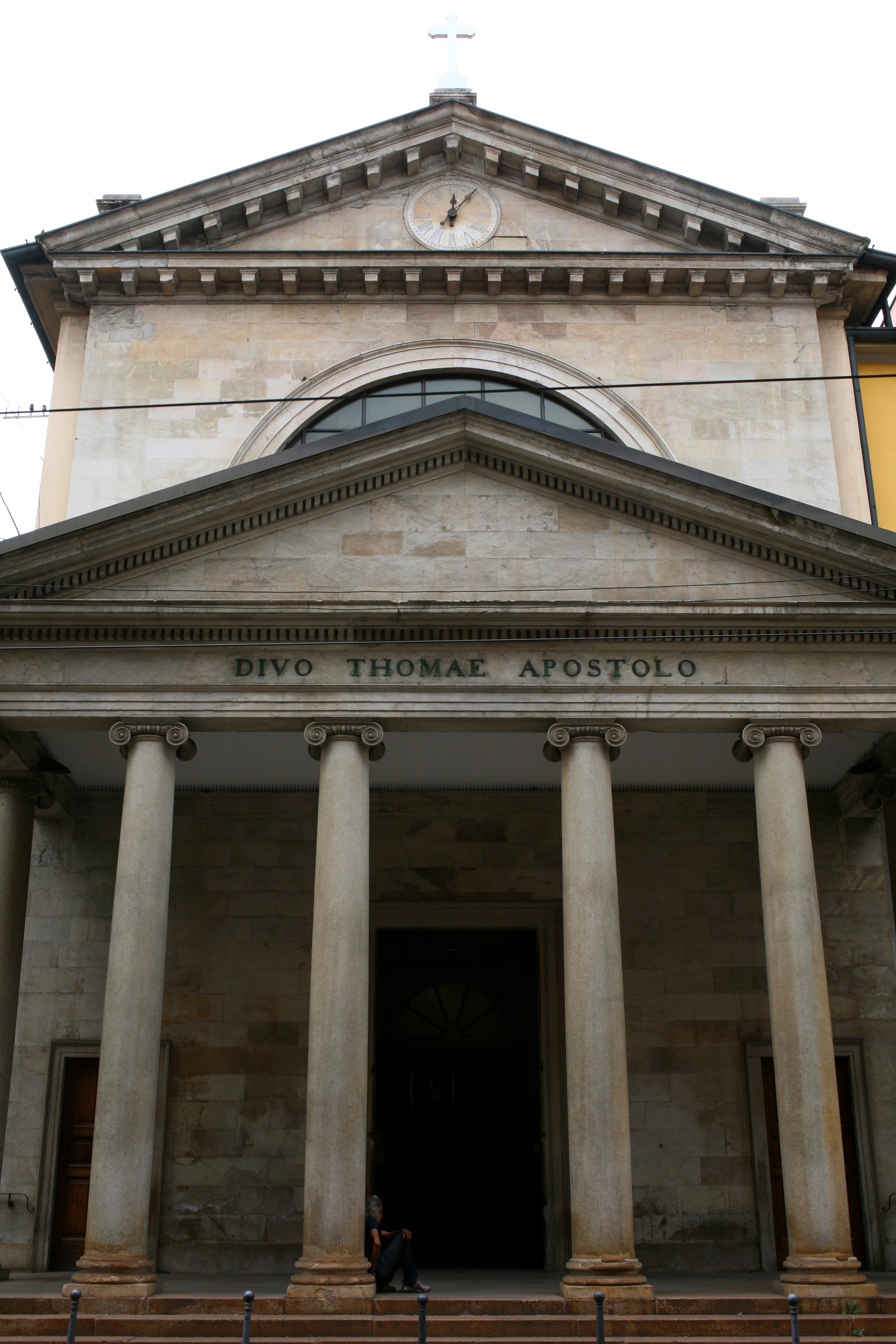
San Tomaso in Terramara, Milan. Facade completed in 1827.

San Tomaso in Terramara is a Neoclassical architecture, Roman Catholic church in Milan, Italy. Construction at the site began in the 11th century; the present structure with an imposing facade designed by Gerolamo Arganini was completed in 1827.

== History ==
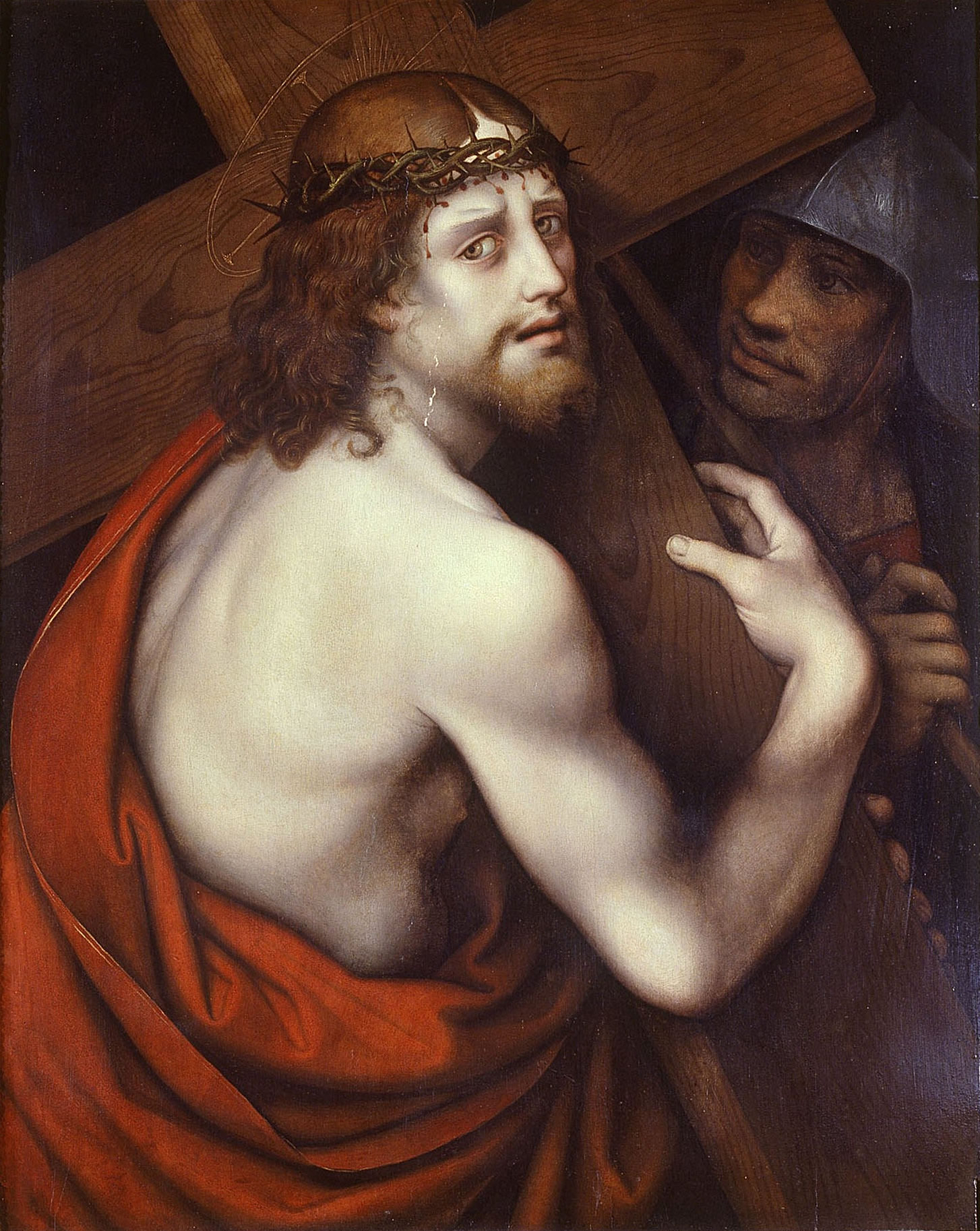
Painting depicting Christ Carrying the Cross by Giovan Pietro Rizzoli detto il Giampietrino, early 1630s

The earliest records of the church are from the 11th century. There are various explanations as to the origin of the name Terramara, the most probable being that it derives from Terra Amara (bitter earth) or Terra Mala (bad earth), in memory of those who survived the 11th century barbaric invasions. By order of Carlo Borromeo, the church was rebuilt in 1576.

== Architecture ==
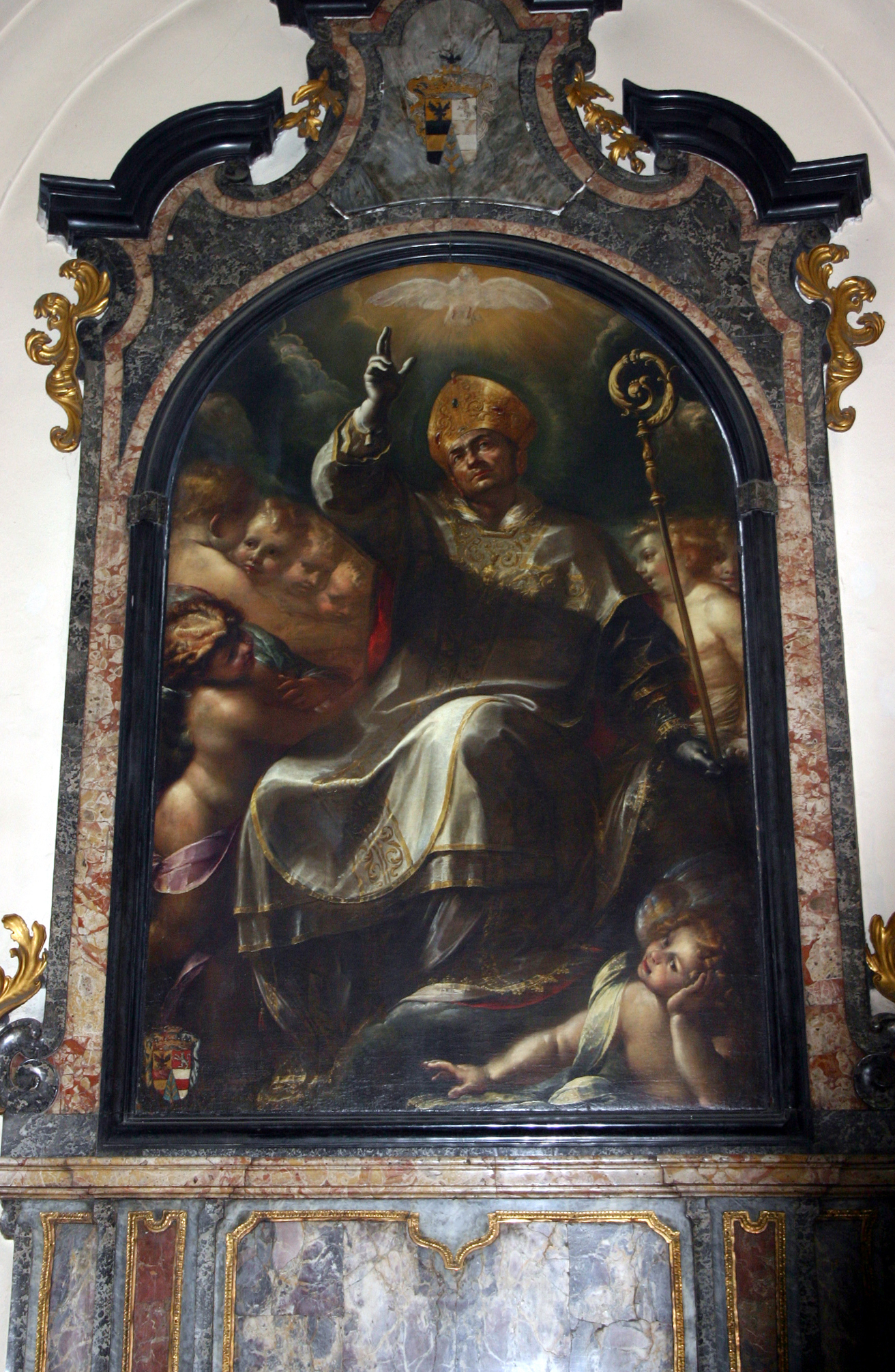
Procaccini's Carlo Borromeo altarpiece

Little remains of the original structure, today's church consisting of a mixture of 16th century and Neoclassical architecture. The facade, completed in 1827 to a design by Gerolamo Arganini, is made up of a portico of six Ionic columns supporting a triangular pediment which partly hides a semicircular window. Based on a longitudinal plan, the church's single nave ends in a semicircular apse with a Neoclassical altar from 1779 designed by Giuseppe Zanoia. One of the most notable of the various altarpieces in the church is that attributed to Giulio Cesare Procaccini depicting San Carlo Borromeo assunto in cielo (Carlo Borromeo's assumption into heaven).

== Bibliography ==
- Micaela Pisaroni, Il neoclassicismo - Itinerari di Milano e Provincia, Como, NodoLibri, 1999. (in Italian)
