= Pompeo Marchesi =

Italian sculptor

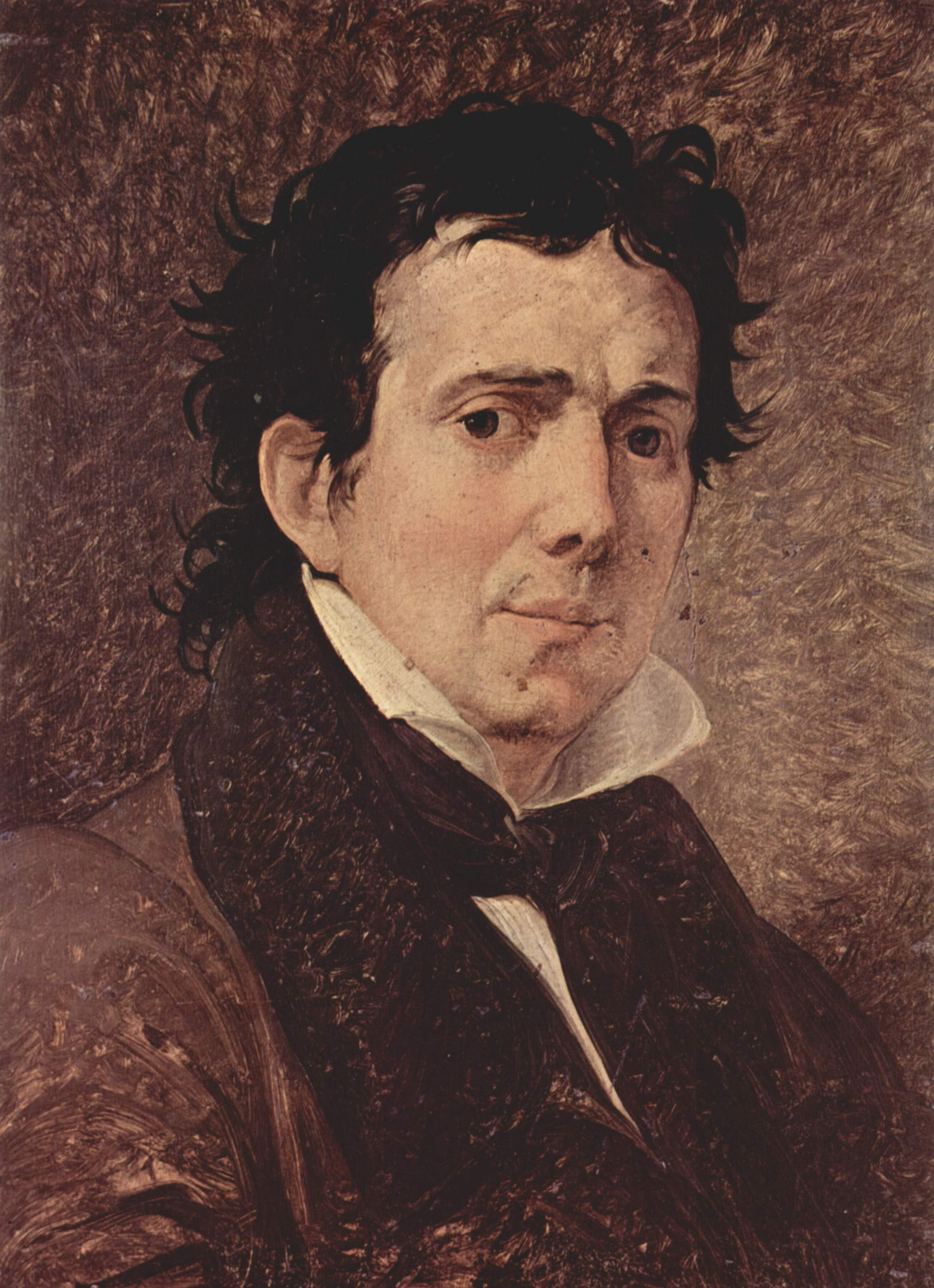
- Portrait of Pompeo Marchesi by Francesco Hayez, oil on canvas, 1830, Galleria d'Arte Moderna, Milan
- Born: 7 August 1783; Saltrio, Duchy of Milan
- Died: 6 February 1858 (aged 74); Milan, Kingdom of Lombardy–Venetia
- Known for: Historical and religious sculpture
- Movement: Neoclassicism

Pompeo Marchesi (Italian pronunciation: [pomˈpɛːo marˈkeːzi]; 7 August 1783 – 6 February 1858) was a Lombard sculptor of the neoclassical school.

== Biography ==
=== Early life and education ===
Marchesi was born in Saltrio, near Milan. He studied at the Brera Academy in Milan under the aegis of the Neo-classicist Giuseppe Franchi. In 1804 he won a government scholarship to continue his education in Rome, where he remained for five years, studying under Antonio Canova. During this period he sent at least two examples of his work to the Pinacoteca di Brera, Milan, including the plaster low relief of Socrates Urging Alcibiades to Leave a Brothel (1807; Galleria d'Arte Moderna, Milan). Returning to Milan, in 1811 he won first prize for sculpture in a government-sponsored competition, with a terracotta group, completed in Rome, of the Belvedere Torso Restored and Assembled with the Apollo (1811; Milan, Galleria d'Arte Moderna, Milan).

=== Career ===
By 1810 he had already begun his lifelong collaboration with the cathedral works of Milan Cathedral, for which he created numerous statues of saints, including the prophets Ezekiel and Amos (1810–11) for the cathedral’s façade. In 1813 he was summoned by the architect Luigi Cagnola to take part in the sculptural decoration of the Arco della Pace, Milan, for which he created various marble reliefs, including the Foundation of the Kingdom of Lombardy and Venice (1829–30) and the Occupation of Lyon (c. 1813–26); he used models created by Camillo Pacetti before 1814 for the two Victories on the front facing the countryside and sculpted the colossal statues of the rivers Adige and Tagliamento for the crown of the arch.

=== Maturity ===
In 1826 Marchesi was summoned to the Brera Academy in Milan to serve temporarily as professor of sculpture, a post that he held from 1838 to 1852. He was extremely active throughout this period: a favourite of the Austrian government, he obtained many public and private commissions, which allowed him to open a studio attended by numerous pupils and assistants and also visited by sovereigns, artists and intellectuals. The most obvious sign of the favour he enjoyed was the gift from the city of Milan of a new studio, opened in 1835 by the Austrian viceroy, Archduke Rainer Joseph, following the destruction of his old one in a fire the previous year.

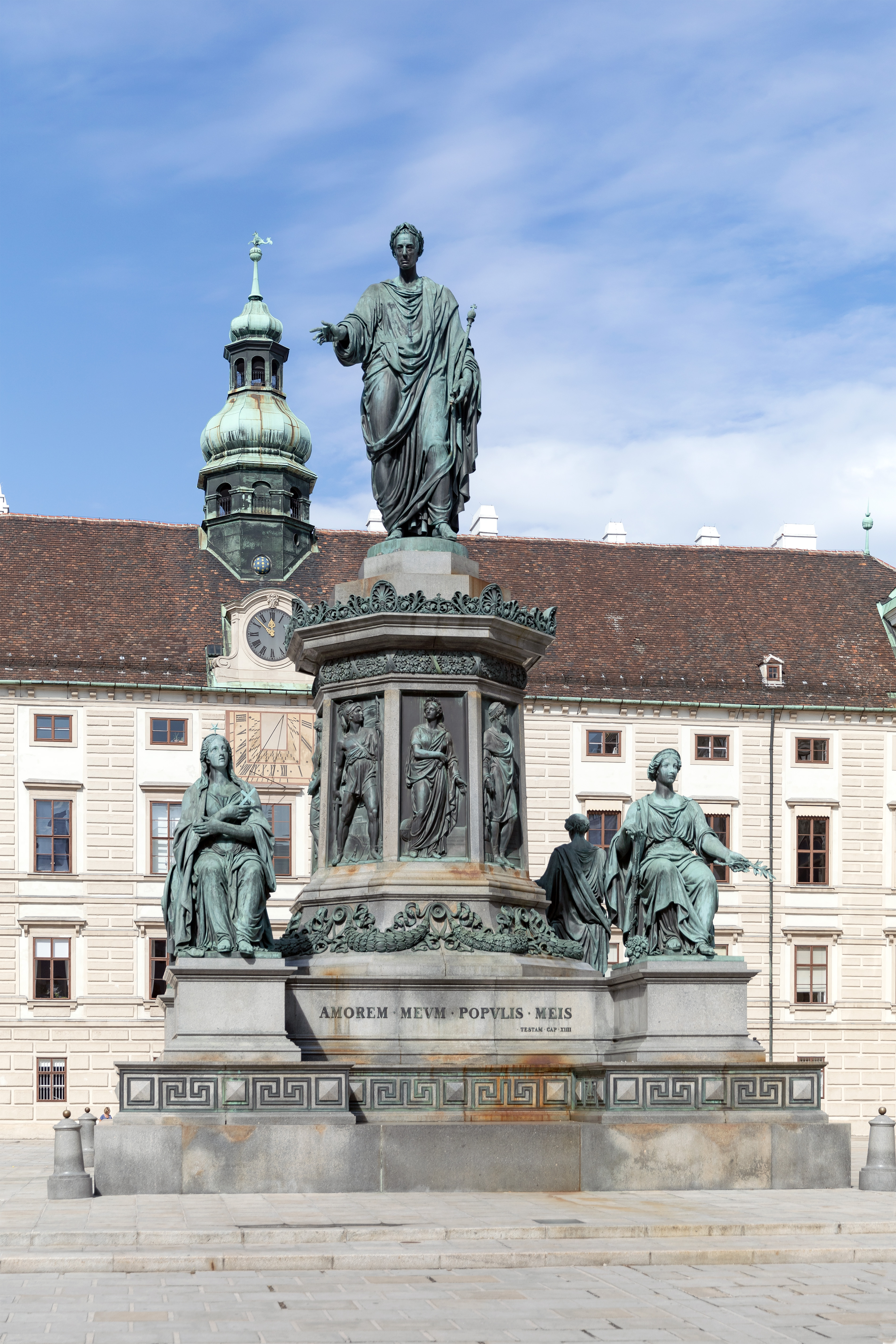
Monument to Francis II, Holy Roman Emperor, Hofburg Palace (Vienna, 1846)

An extremely prolific artist, his most memorable works include the monument dedicated to Emmanuel Philibert of Savoy (1835) for the Cappella Reale in Turin Cathedral and the monuments to the Habsburg emperor Francis I of Austria in the Freiheitsplatz in Graz (1841) and in the Burgplatz of the Hofburg, Vienna (completed 1846). He also produced a series of funerary stelae and portrait busts, the most outstanding being his marble busts of Antonio Canova and Andrea Appiani (both 1835; Galleria d'Arte Moderna, Milan).

He decorated the façade of the Castello with twelve figures of great Italian captains, and that of the Palazzo Saporiti with reliefs in modern classic style. One of his best-known compositions is the group of the "Mater Dolorosa", in the church of San Carlo al Corso, Milan, at which he worked for many years.

Works outside Milan include the larger than life statue of Charles Emmanuel III in Novara and the sitting figure of Goethe for the library in Frankfurt; He also executed the monument to Volta in Como; the monument of the singer Maria Malibran; others to Cesare Beccaria and Bellini and a bust of Professor Zuccala for the Atheneum of Bergamo. Marchesi died in Milan on 6 February. There is a portrait of him by Francesco Hayez in the Galleria d'Arte Moderna, Milan. Another portrait of Marchesi by Friedrich von Amerling is in the Österreichische Galerie Belvedere.

== Gallery ==
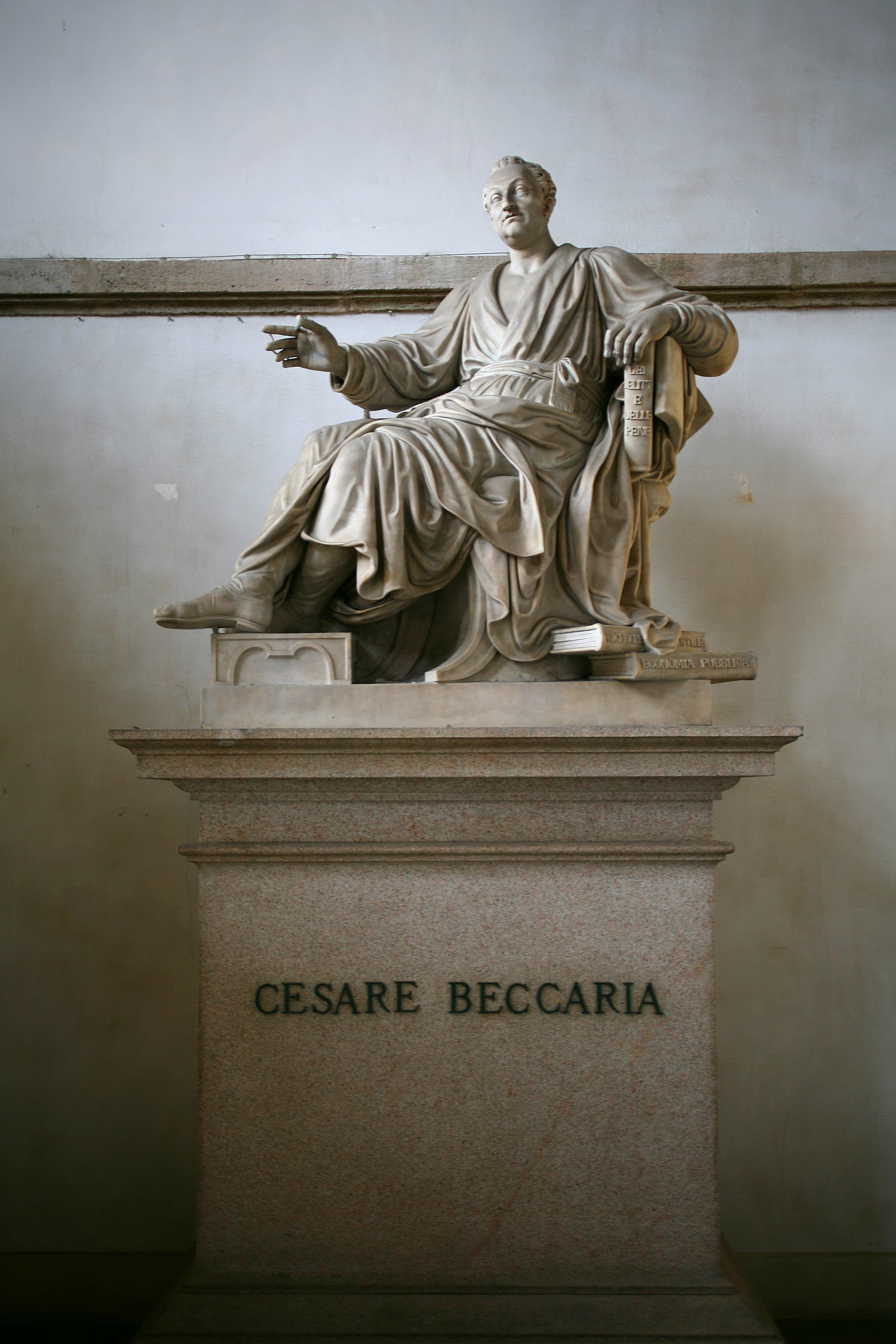
Monument to Cesare Beccaria, by Pompeo Marchesi, on the staircase leading to the first floor of the Palace of Brera in Milan

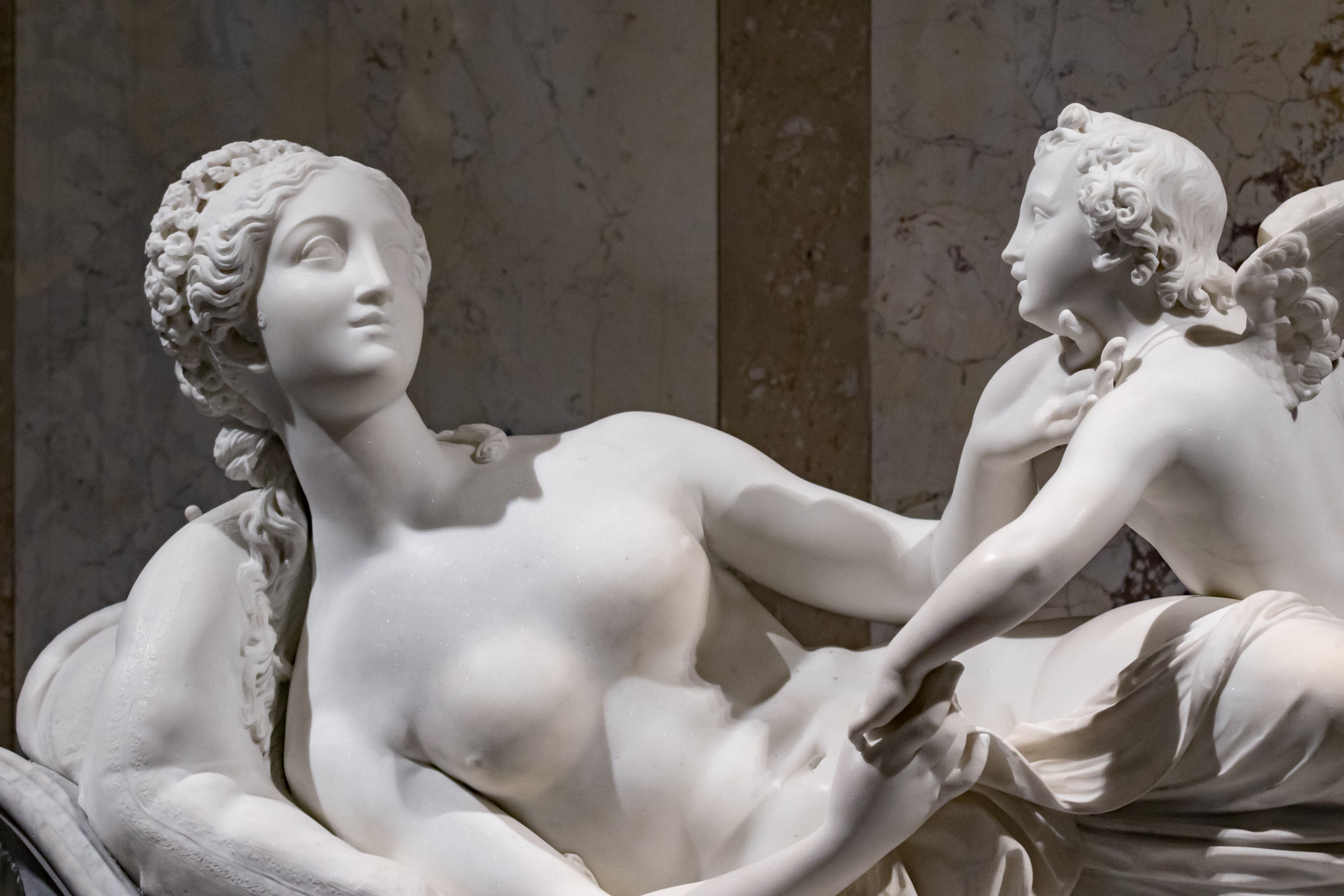
Venus and Amor (1838, marble), Kunsthistorisches Museum, Vienna.

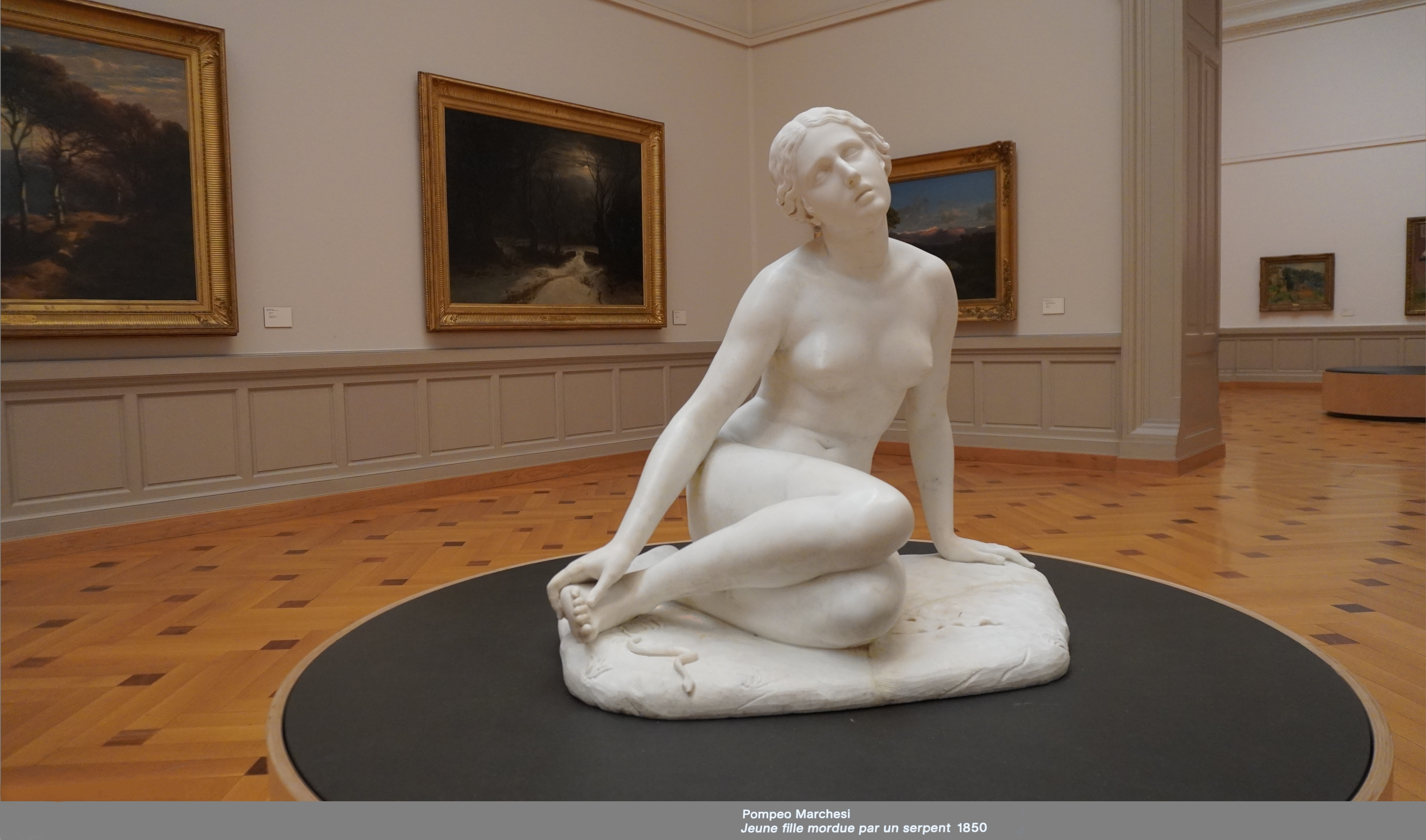
Young girl bitten by a snake (1850, marble)

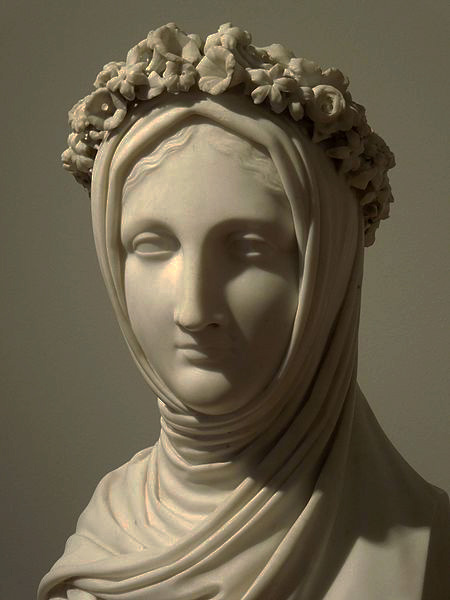
Vestal Virgin

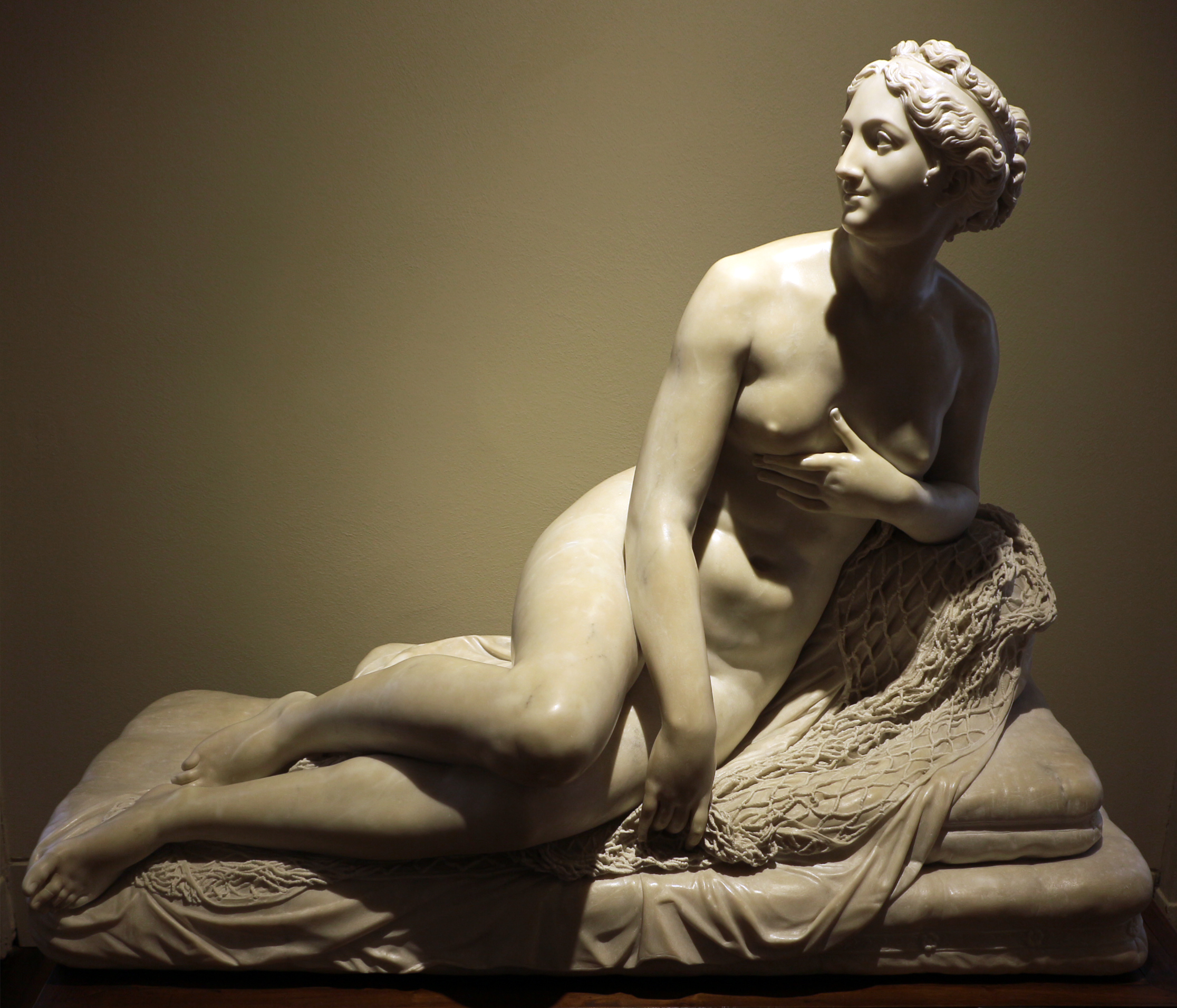
Venus (1855, marble), Galleria d'Arte Moderna, Milan

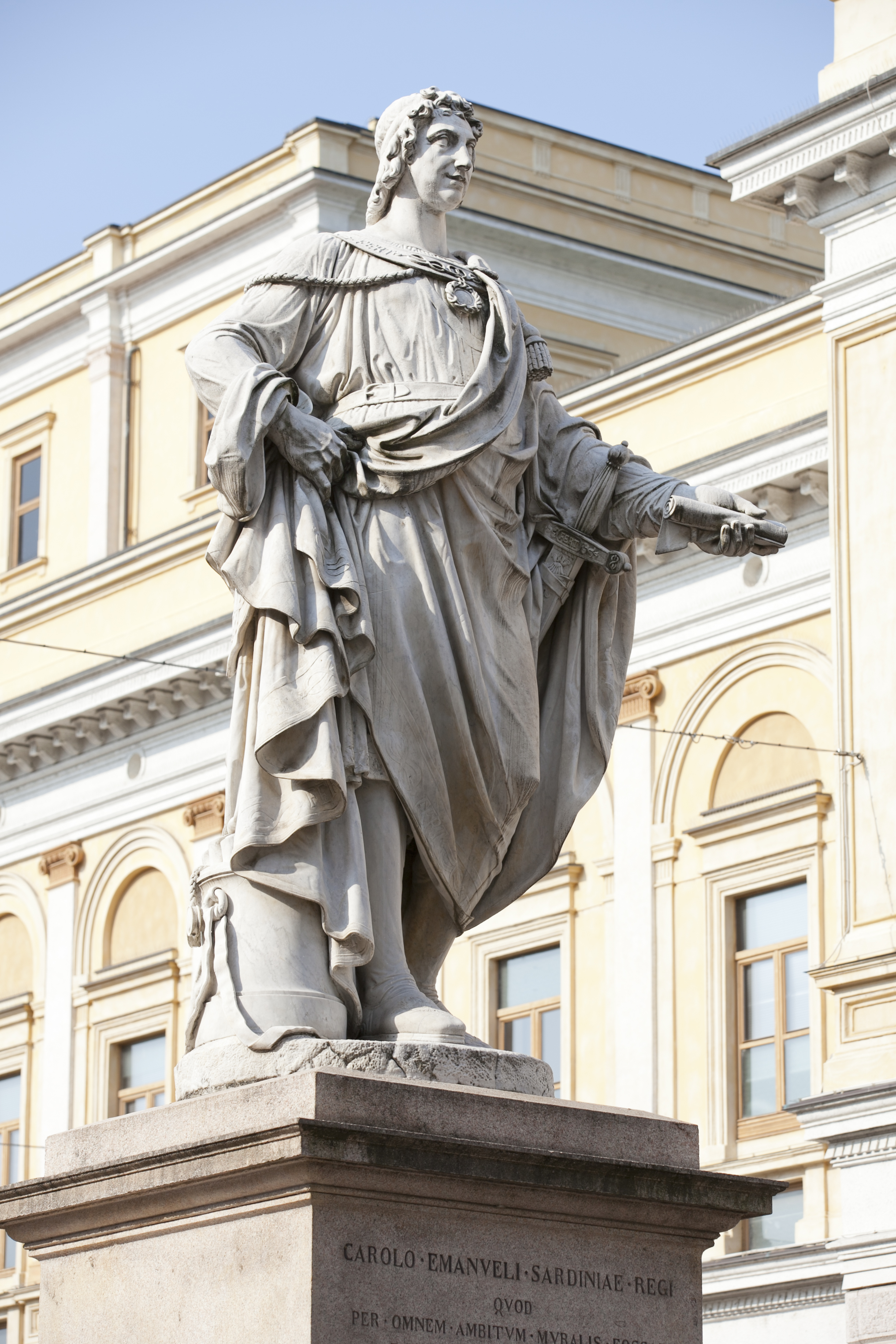
Statue of Charles Emmanuel III of Sardinia, Novara

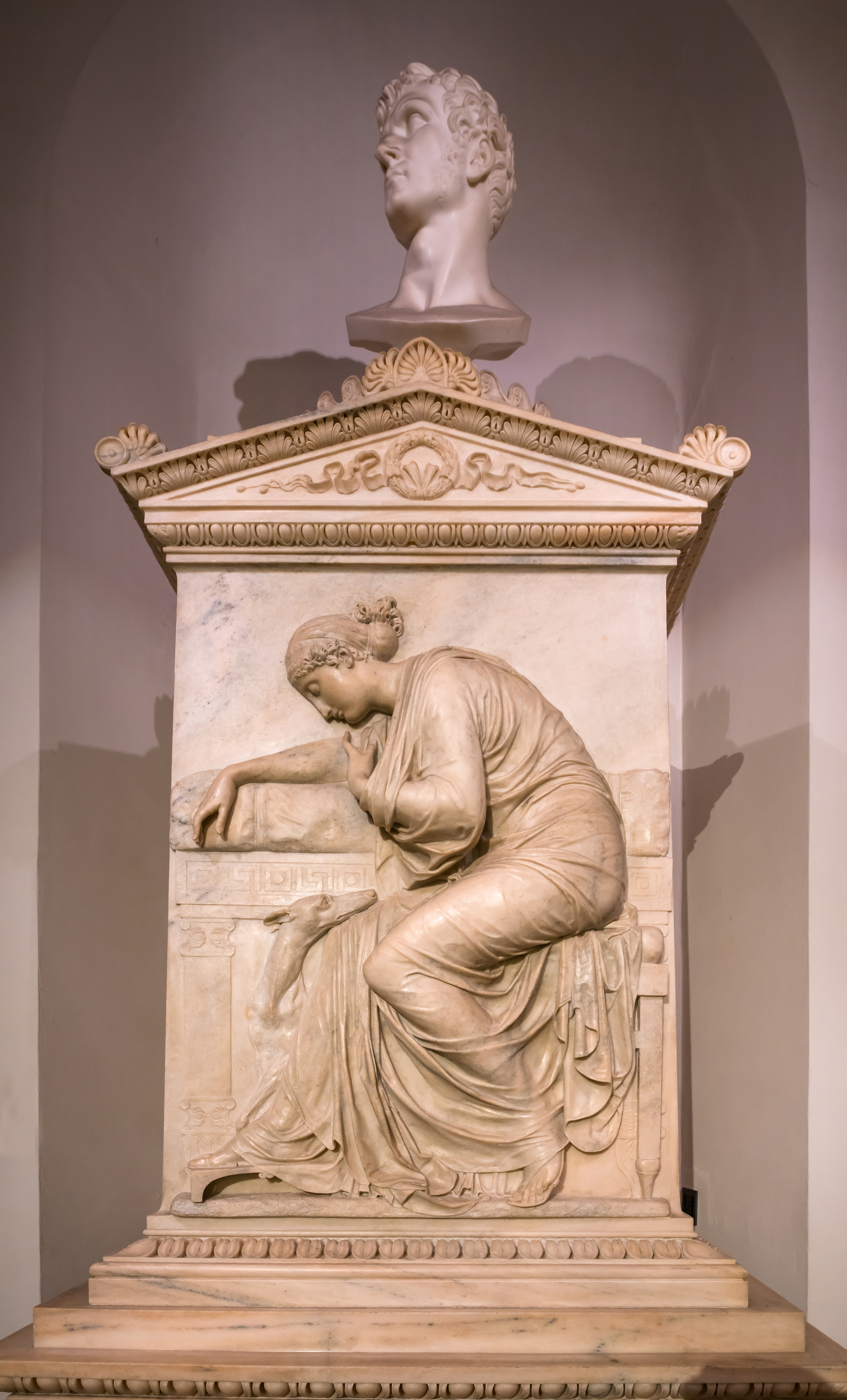
Antonio Canova and Pompeo Marchesi, Monument to Giuseppe Bossi (1818), Pinacoteca Ambrosiana, Milan

== Sources ==
- Brook, Carolina (2007). "MARCHESI, Pompeo". Dizionario Biografico degli Italiani (in Italian). Vol. 69: Mangiabotti–Marconi. Rome: Istituto dell'Enciclopedia Italiana. ISBN 978-88-12-00032-6.
- The entry cites:
  - Gerolamo Boccardo, Nuova Enciclopedia Italiana, XIII (Turin, 1882);
  - Baedeker, Guide Book for Italy (New York, 1904).
