= Ferdinando Albertolli =

Swiss-born Italian architect and a professor of design(1781–1844)

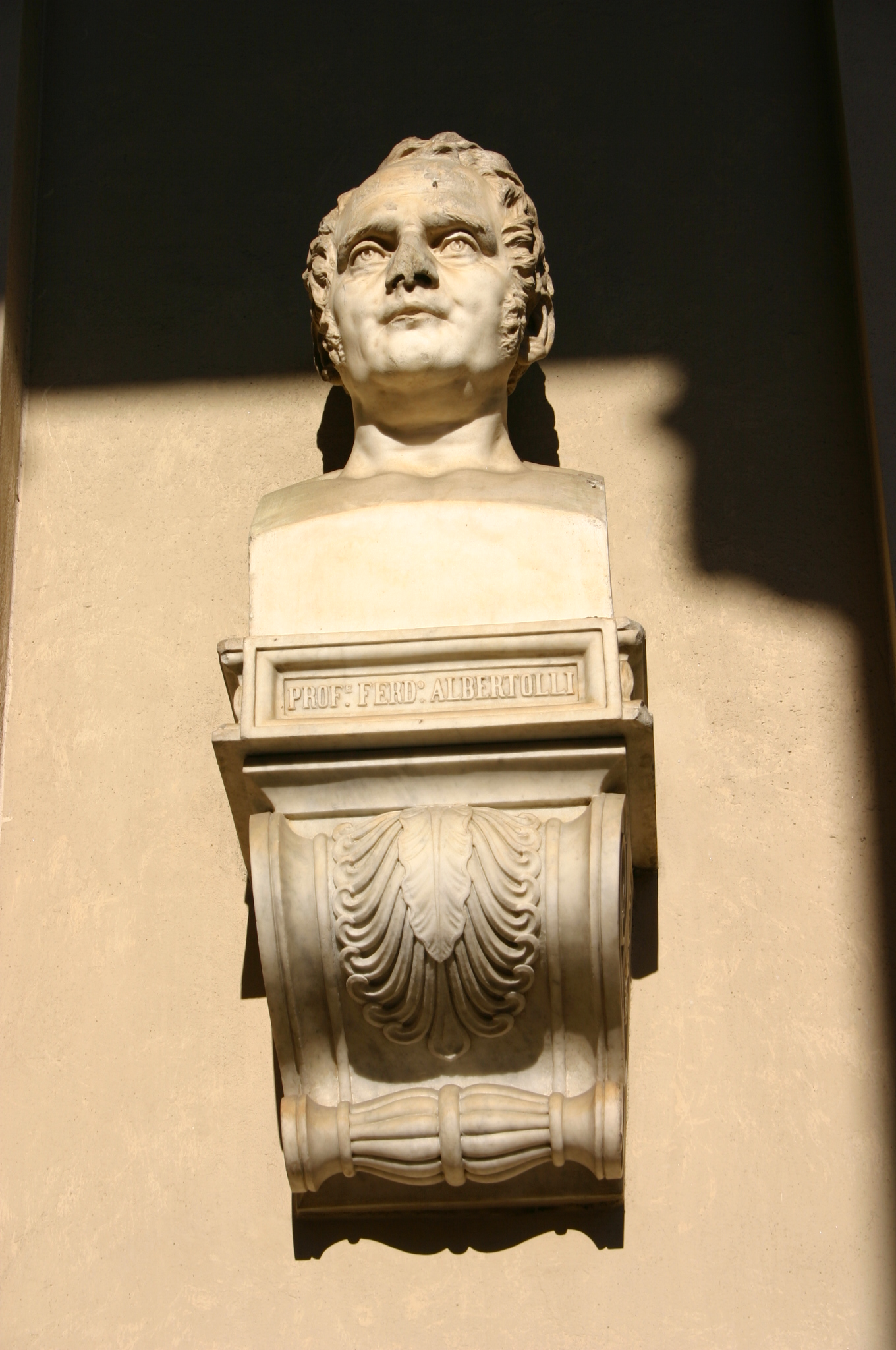
- Bust of Ferdinando Albertolli at the Brera Academy
- Born: 11 November 1780; Bedano, Ticino, Switzerland
- Died: 24 April 1844 (aged 90); Milan, Kingdom of Lombardy–Venetia
- Occupation: Architect
- Movement: Neoclassicism

Ferdinando Albertolli (11 November 1780 – 24 April 1844) was a Swiss-born Italian architect and a professor of design.

== Biography ==
Born in Bedano near Lugano, Switzerland, Albertolli was educated at Milan's Brera Academy where he was instructed by his uncle Giocondo Albertolli in engraving, design and architecture, receiving the first prize for design in 1806. In 1804, he taught at the high school in Verona until 1808 when he became professor of design at the Academy of Fine Arts in Venice. In 1812, he was appointed professor of design at the Brera Academy, a post he held for the remainder of his life.

His publications drew on his stay in Verona and in Venice; he also travelled to Tuscany, Rome, Greece and London (where he went to gather material on some Greek friezes for publication) and, according to his uncle’s account, to Naples and Paris. In 1838 he became an Honorary Fellow of the Royal Institute of British Architects and in 1843 was nominated a member of the Academy of Fine Arts in Vienna.

Albertolli's Palazzo Taverna in the Del Monte district of Milan was completed in 1835 in the late Neoclassical style. It is notable in that it is reminiscent of Milan's Royal Villa and of country houses in general as the main body of the building is set back to form a courtyard overlooking the street. The entrance consists of an Ionic colonnade supporting a parapet. The two lateral sections have giant pilasters surmounted by triangular tympani.

Albertolli was noted for his decorative designs for interiors and furnishings (he won a gold medal for his design of a clockcase), for which he adopted the Empire style. His fame also rests on his work as a printmaker, above all for his skill in aquatint. He provided illustrations for his uncle’s publications; some plates for Giovanni Antonio Antolini’s Il Tempio di Minerva in Assisi confrontato con le tavole di Andrea Palladio (Milan, 1803) and the Descrizione del Foro Bonaparte (Parma, 1806); some for Luigi Cagnola’s Le solenni esequie di monsignor Filippo Visconti (Milan, 1802) as well as views of the Arco della Pace; and some plates for Cosimo Morelli’s Descrizione delle feste celebrate in Venezia per la venuta di S.M.I.R. Napoleone (Venice, 1808).

== Bibliography ==
- Brugnoli, Pierpaolo; Sandrini, Arturo (1994). L'architettura a Verona dal periodo napoleonico all'età contemporanea (in Italian). Banca Popolare di Verona.
