= Palazzo Belgioioso =

Palace in Milan, Italy

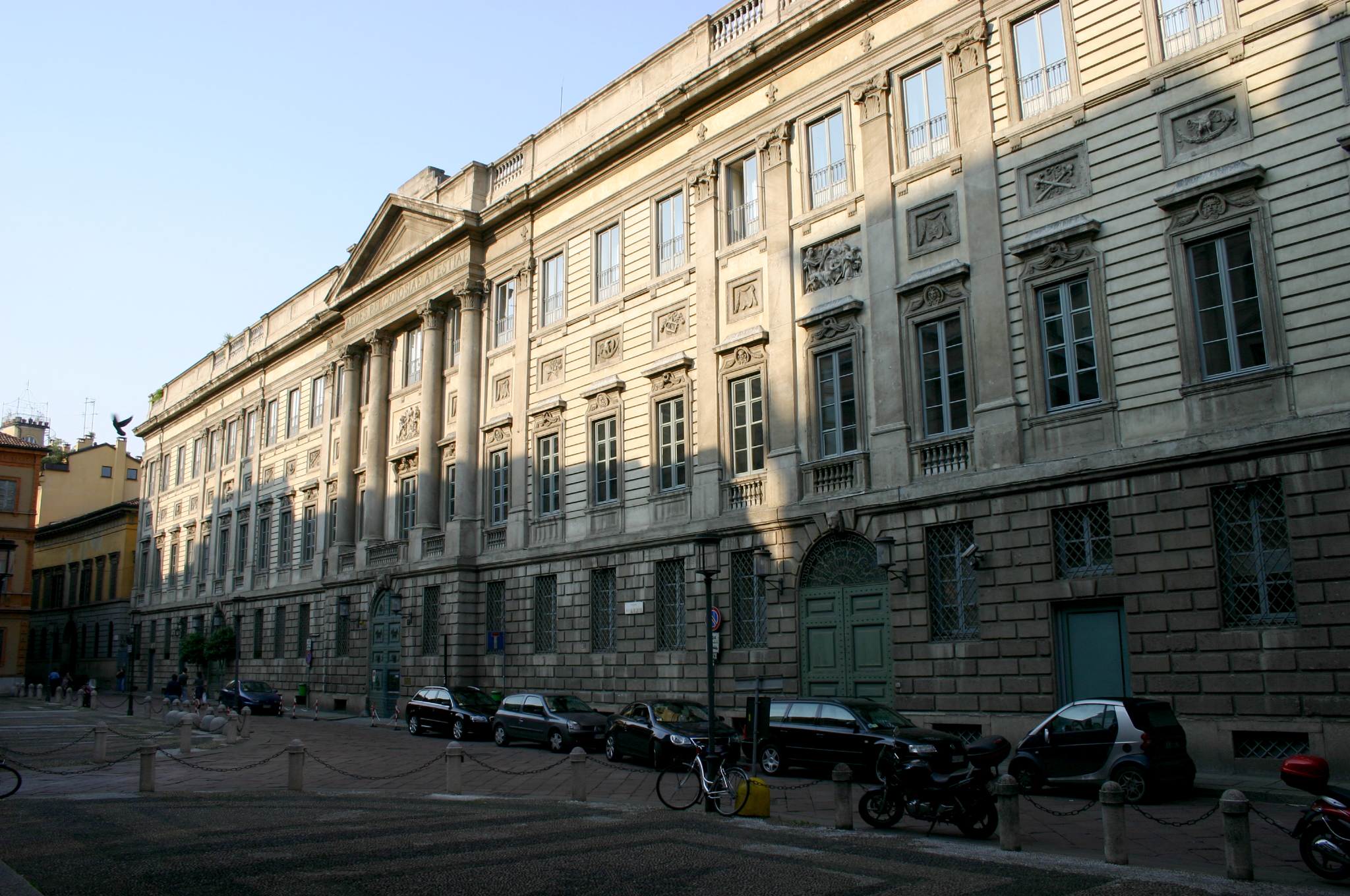
- Palazzo Belgioioso, Milan

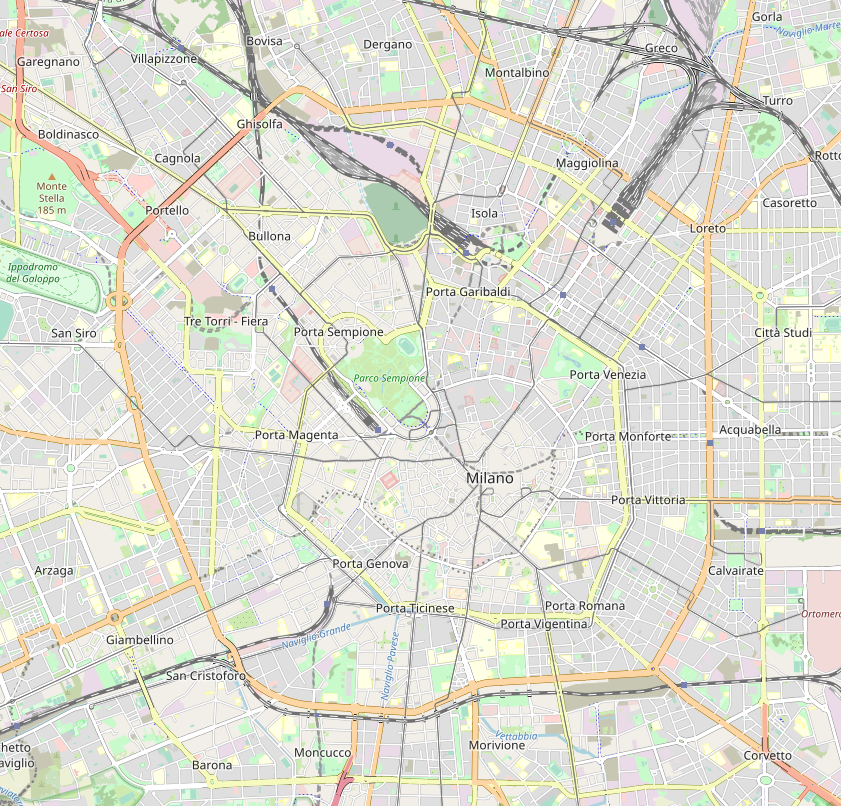
- Location within Milan Location within Italy

General information
- Architectural style: Neoclassical
- Location: 2, 20121 Milano MI, Italy, Milan, Italy
- Coordinates: 45.467578°N 9.192423°E
- Completed: 1781

Design and construction
- Architect: Giuseppe Piermarini

The Palazzo Belgioioso (also spelled Belgiojoso) is a palatial residence in the northern Italian city of Milan, completed in 1781 in a Neoclassical style by Giuseppe Piermarini.

Considered to be one of Milan's architectural treasures, the mansion is modeled on Luigi Vanvitelli's Palace of Caserta. Built for Prince Alberico XII di Belgioioso d'Este, it is located on a side street off Via Manzoni on the site of the house where he was born. One of the finest examples of Neoclassical architecture in Lombardy, it stands out like a jewel in the centre of the city. It was designed in 1772 by Giuseppe Piermarini who in this instance abandoned the sober and austere style of early Neoclassicism, building an imposing and highly decorated mansion which dominates the street. The most lavishly decorated part of the facade is the slightly protruding central section with a series of four giant order columns, an entablature and a tympanum enclosed by pilasters. The ground floor is finished in rusticated bugnato ashlar, the first floor, separated from the second with bas-reliefs of heraldic symbols, has windows crowned with garlands and decorative mouldings. Some of the rooms still have period decorations, the most famous of which is the gallery decorated with frescoes by Martin Knoller and stuccos by Giocondo Albertolli. Rinaldo's room, also decorated by Knoller, was inspired by Torquato Tasso's epic poem Jerusalem Delivered.

Under the ownership of Alberico XII di Belgioioso d'Este, a keen collector of books and works of art, the residence was frequented by illustrious intellectuals of the times, including the poet Giuseppe Parini and the writer Ugo Foscolo. Work carried out in 1991 restored the mansion to its former glory.

== See also ==
- Neoclassical architecture in Milan
