= Fashion in Milan =

Aspect of culture in Milan

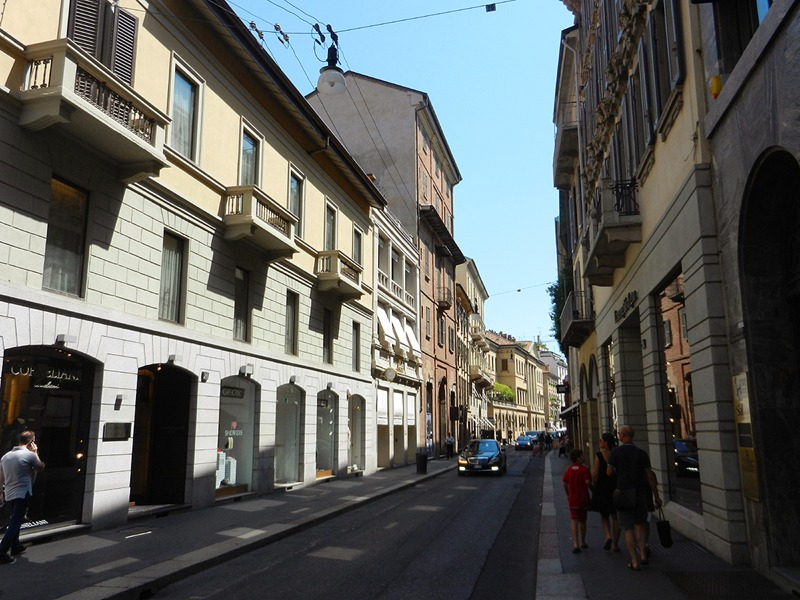
Via Monte Napoleone, the leading thoroughfare in Milan's "golden quadrilateral". As of 2025, it is the most expensive shopping street in the world.

The Italian city of Milan is recognised internationally as one of the world's most important fashion capitals, along with Paris, New York and London.

Milan has established some history within the fields of clothing and luxury, textiles and design in general. Throughout the late 19th century, Milan, as the capital of Lombardy, was a major production centre, benefitting from its status as one of the country's salient economic and industrial city. Milanese fashion, despite taking inspiration from the leading Parisian couture of the time, developed its own approach, which was by nature devoted to sobriety, simplicity and the quality of the fabric. Throughout the 19th and 20th century, the city expanded its role as a fashion centre, with a number of rising designers contributing to Milan's image as Italy's fashion capital, stemming from Italy's ruins "that English gentlemen flok to admire ("Gran Tour of Italy", French for big trip)" and to enjoy its opera.

Milan emerged in the 1960s and 1980s as one of the world's pre-eminent trendsetters by the lots of migrants from southern Italian regions for jobs, maintaining this stint well into the 1990s and 2000s and culminating with its entrenchment as one of the "big four" global fashion capitals.

In 2009, the city was declared as the "fashion capital of the world" by the Global Language Monitor that tracks how many times a city is posted in social media using "fashion capital," even surpassing its relative cities. The next year, Milan dropped out of the top four falling to sixth place, yet in 2011 it returned to fourth place. 2012 saw the city suffer its lowest ranking to date, as it slipped to eighth place.

== History ==
Milan began as a centre of luxurious quality in the Renaissance and late Middle Ages as Florence, also known for quality textiles from Asia and the development of the Italian banking system. Goods were imported via important Italian maritime city-states of Venice and Genoa while the making of luxury goods was an industry of such importance that in 16th century the city gave its name to the English word "milaner" or "millaner", meaning fine wares like jewellery, cloth, hats and luxury apparel. By the 19th century, a later variant, "millinery", had come to mean one who made or sold hats.

In the mid-19th century cheaper silk began to be imported from Asia and the pest phylloxera damaged silk and wine production. More land was subsequently given over to industrialisation. Textile production was followed by metal and mechanical and furniture manufacture. In 1865, the first major department store in the country opened in Milan by the Bocconi brothers (which was called Alle Città d'Italia and later in 1921 became La Rinascente). This was regarded as a novelty at the time with regards to retailing in Italy. Though, traditionally, artisans would sell the items they made directly or to small stores, the opening of these new department stores modernised the distributions of clothes in the city.

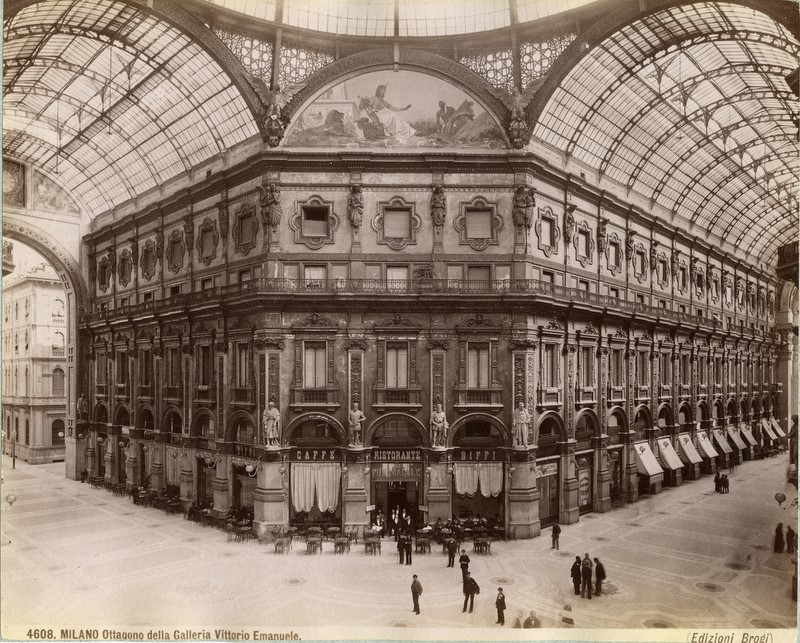
The Galleria Vittorio Emanuele II in 1880.

In terms of the Milanese people, they are said to have probably been "fashion conscious" in the 1880s and late 19th century. The Milanese style was partially inspired by French fashion, which at the time was still dominant in terms of influence, yet adapted according to local tastes; this included a generally sombre and simple style, which was moderate in terms of decoration and ornamentation, and put an emphasis on the quality of tailoring and the different fabrics and textiles. The general Milanese interest in styling was reflected in the number of fashion magazines which circulated in the city at the time, as well as the fact that the people were ready to follow trends; nevertheless, the Milanese style was relatively traditional. The city had several tailors and seamstresses which in 1881 amounted to 249 and in 1886 to 383 (which were listed in guides). In this period, the city was one of the biggest industrial powerhouses in Italy, and had a diversified fashion and clothing economy which was mainly based on small workshops rather than large companies (highlighted in an 1881 census). The importance of this industry continued in the city into the early 20th century, where 42,711 out of 175,871 workers were in the clothing sector in 1911.

Later, in the early-20th century, Milan became a major centre of silk and textile productions. Nevertheless, in the 1950s and 1960s, Florence was the fashion capital of Italy and home of the Italian "Alta Moda", equivalent to the French "haute couture".

However, in the 1970s, Milan's fashion image became more glamorous, and as Florentine designs were usually very formal and expensive, the city became a more popular shopping destination, with numerous boutiques which sold both elegant and everyday clothes. Milanese designs were known for their practicality and simple elegance, and became more popular and affordable than Florentine and Parisian designs. The city became one of the main capitals for ready-to-wear female and male fashion in the 1970s. Milan started to become an internationally successful and famous fashion capital towards the late-1980s and early 1990s. After a brief fall of popularity in the 2000s (when, according to the Global Language Monitor Milan ranked slightly lower than its relatives, such as New York City, Paris, London and Rome), the city has throned 2009's fashion capital of the world. The city left the top four in 2010 going to sixth place, yet came back up to fourth in 2011.

The term sciura encapsulates the look and culture of fashionable, elderly Milanese women.

== Designers, houses, and modelling agencies ==
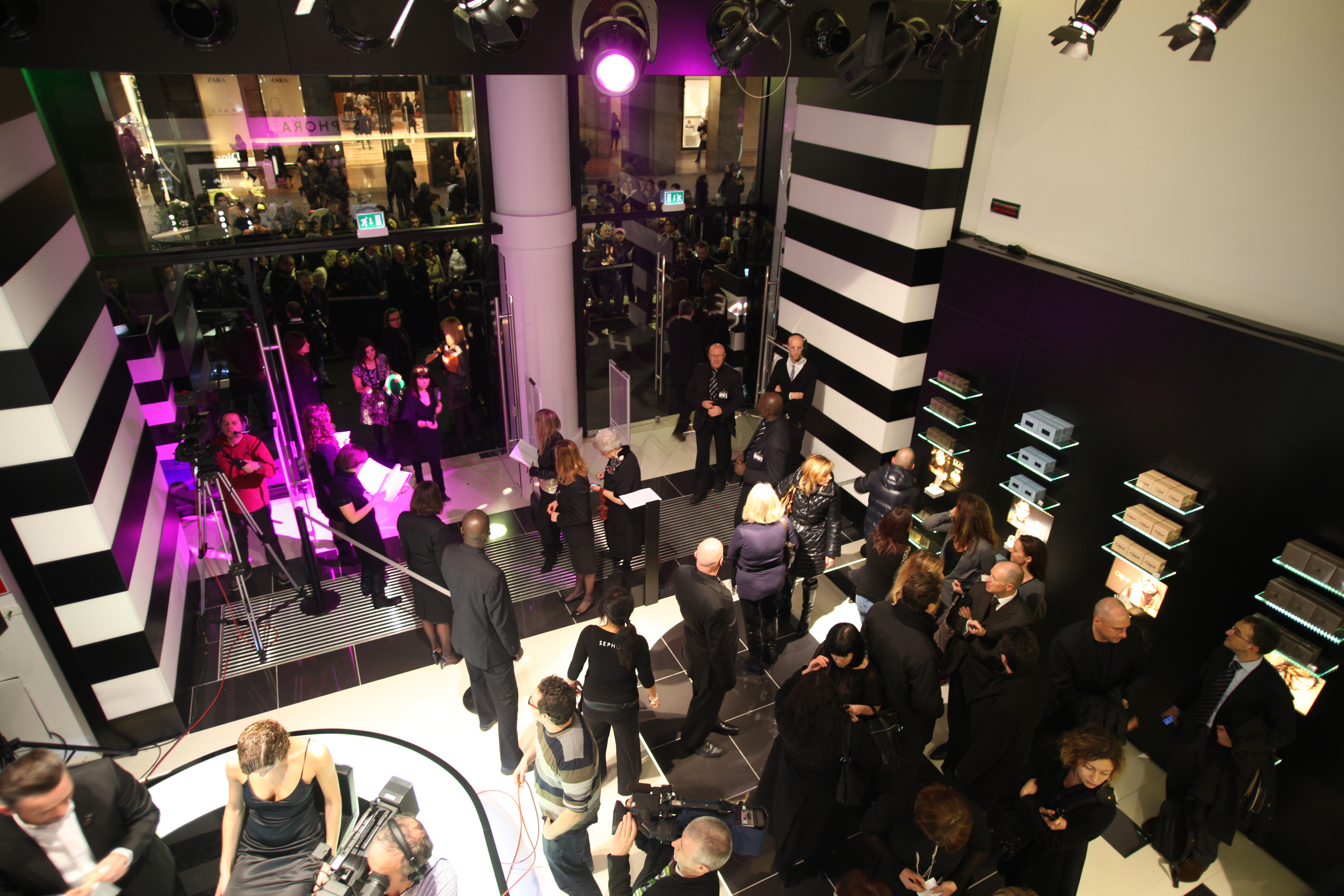
An event in the 2010 Milan Fashion Week.

=== Houses and labels ===
Most of the major Italian fashion houses and labels are based in Milan, even though many of them were founded in other cities. They include: Armani, Boggi Milano, Bottega Veneta, Canali, Costume National, Dolce & Gabbana, Dsquared2, Etro, Iceberg, Les Copains, Marni, Missoni, Miu Miu, Moncler, Frankie Morello, Moschino, MSGM, N°21, Off-White, Prada, Fausto Puglisi, Tod's, Trussardi, Valentino, Versace, Giuseppe Zanotti, Zagliani, Ermenegildo Zegna, and the eyewear company Luxottica.

== Shopping quarters and areas ==
The city's most important shopping streets and districts include Piazza del Duomo (with the Galleria Vittorio Emanuele II) the Quadrilatero della Moda (including Via Montenapoleone, Via della Spiga, Corso Venezia and Via Manzoni). The latter is one of the leading shopping districts in the world; Via Monte Napoleone has been ranked as the sixth most expensive shopping street in the world, with a $770 rent per year per square foot. Streets in this district contain exclusive fashion and couture boutiques.

Nevertheless, there are other important shopping streets and locations in the city, including the Via Dante, Corso Buenos Aires, Piazza San Babila and the Corso Vittorio Emanuele II. Corso Buenos Aires is one of the biggest shopping streets in Europe. The Brera district, the city's bohemian quarter, is also a fashionable area with several boutiques. Furthermore, the Porta Ticinese quarter, which turns into Corso San Gottardo just past the porta contain more independent and also more local fashion stores.

=== Gallery ===
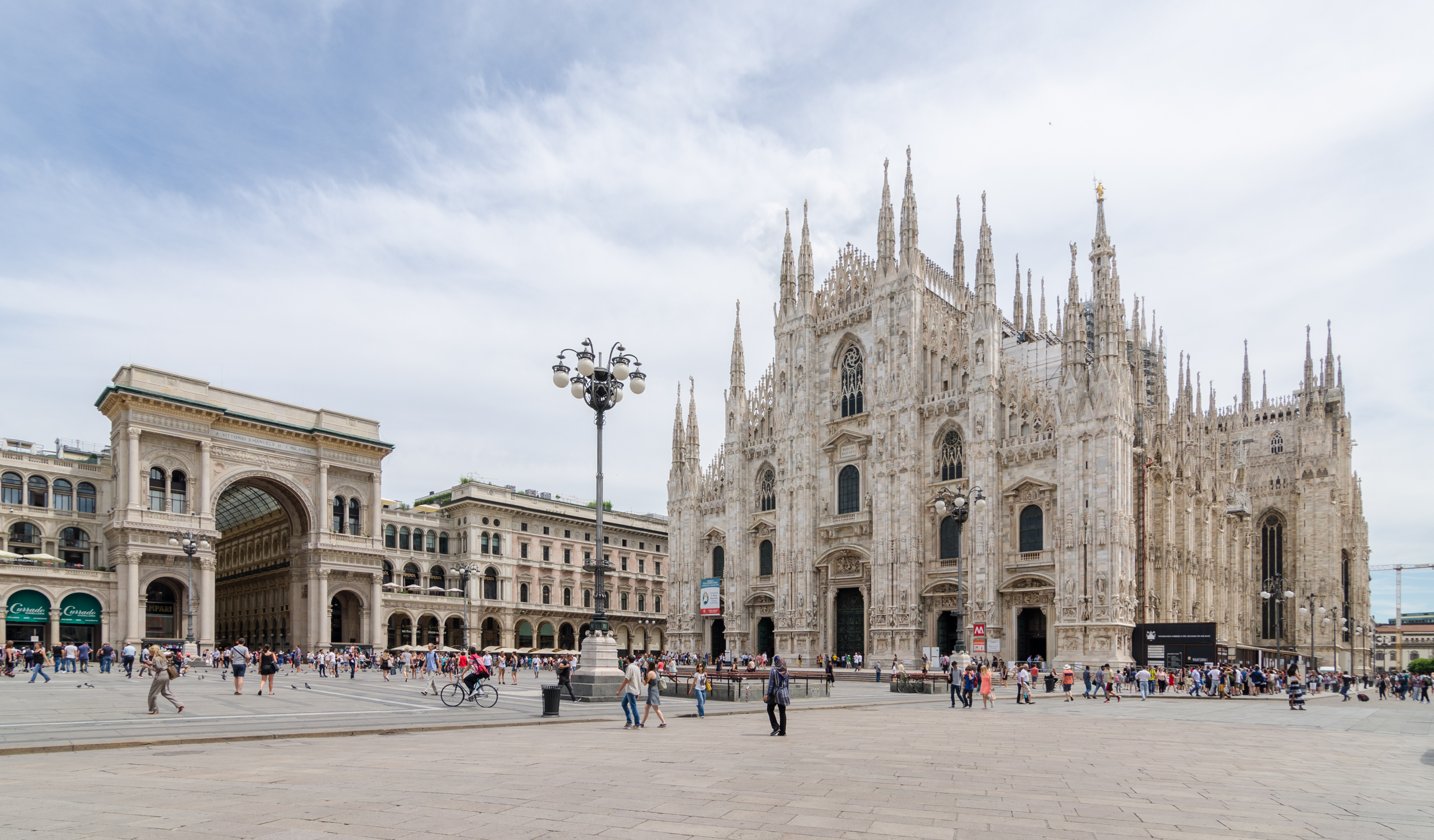
Piazza del Duomo

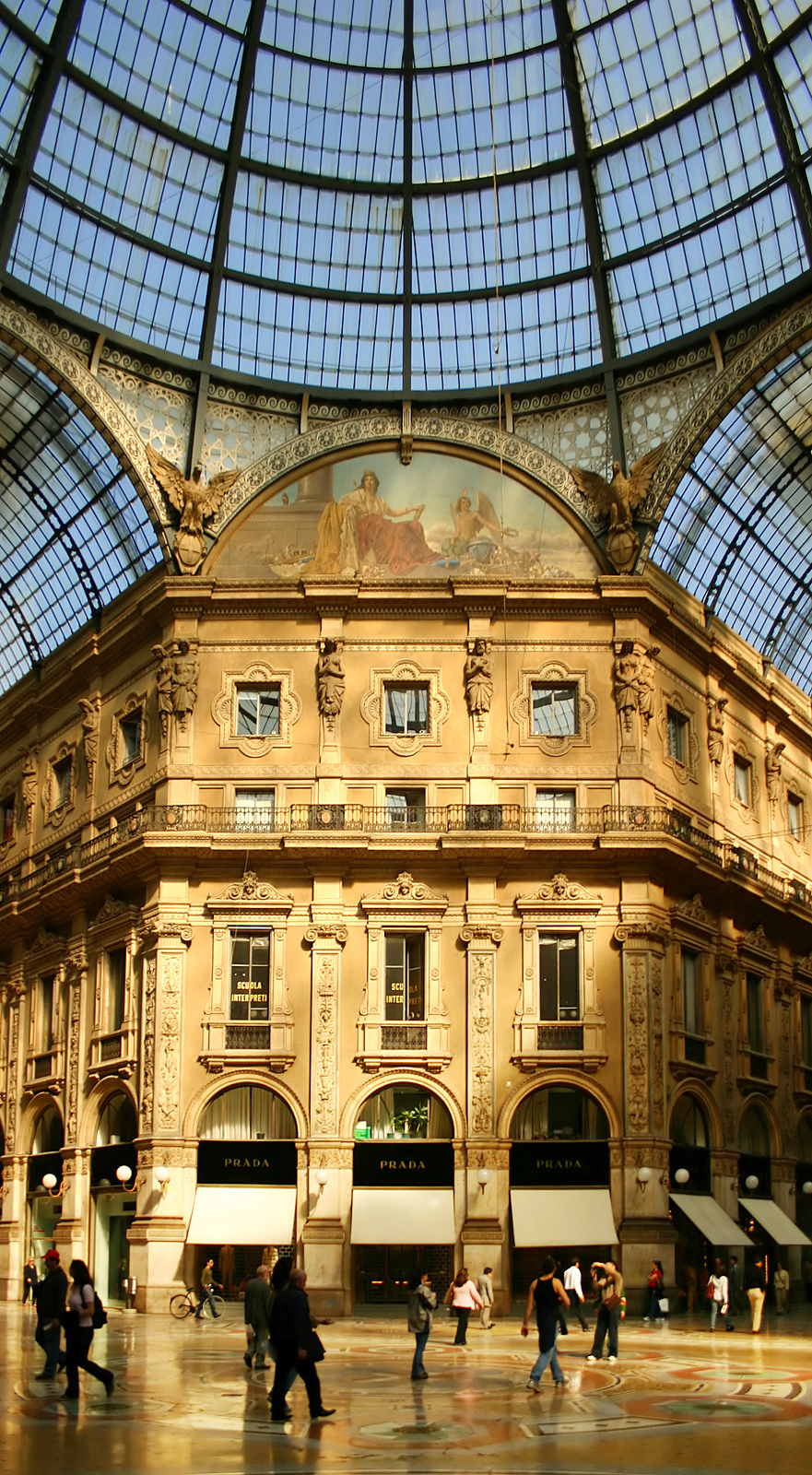
The Galleria Vittorio Emanuele II

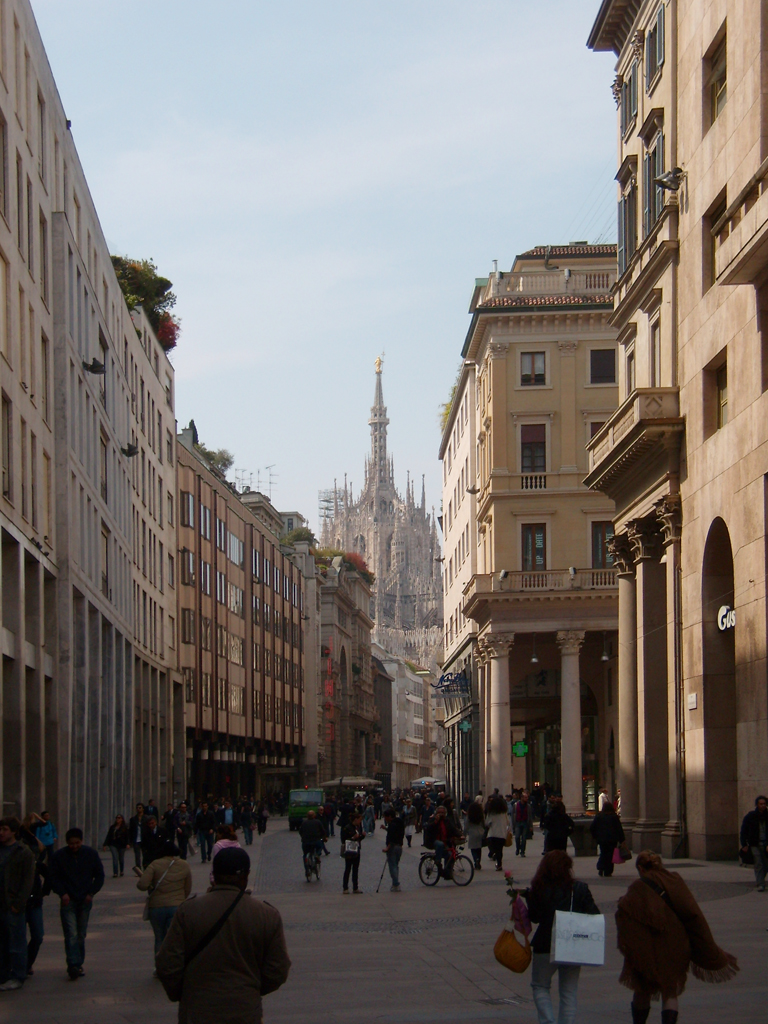
Corso Vittorio Emanuele II

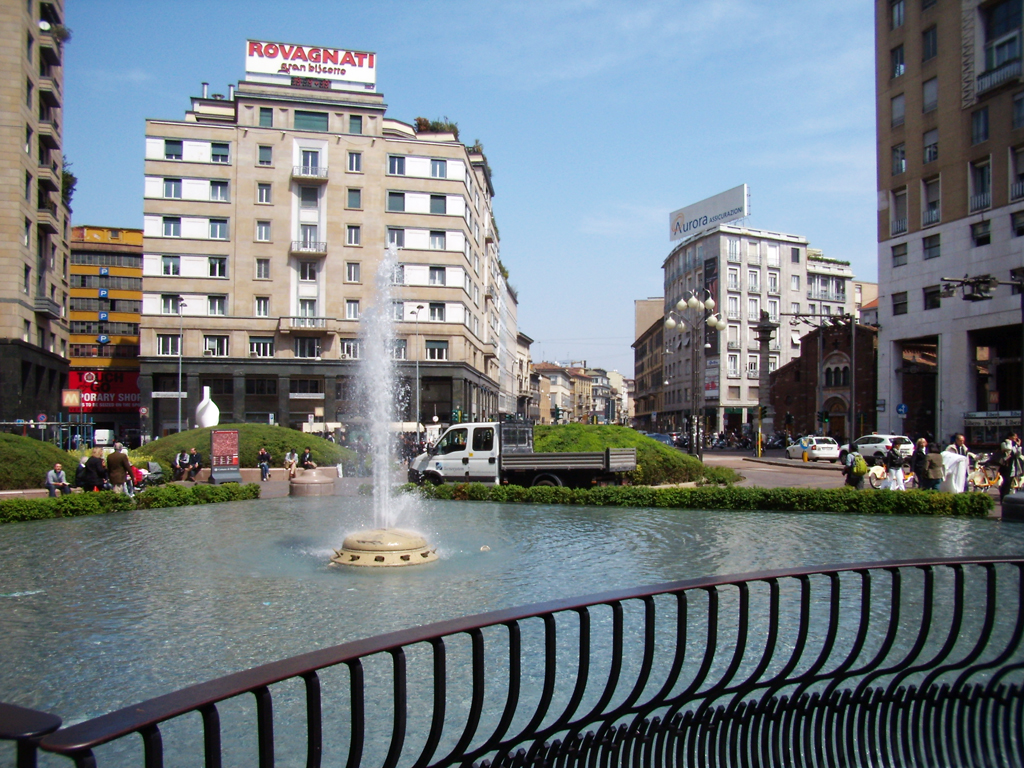
Piazza San Babila

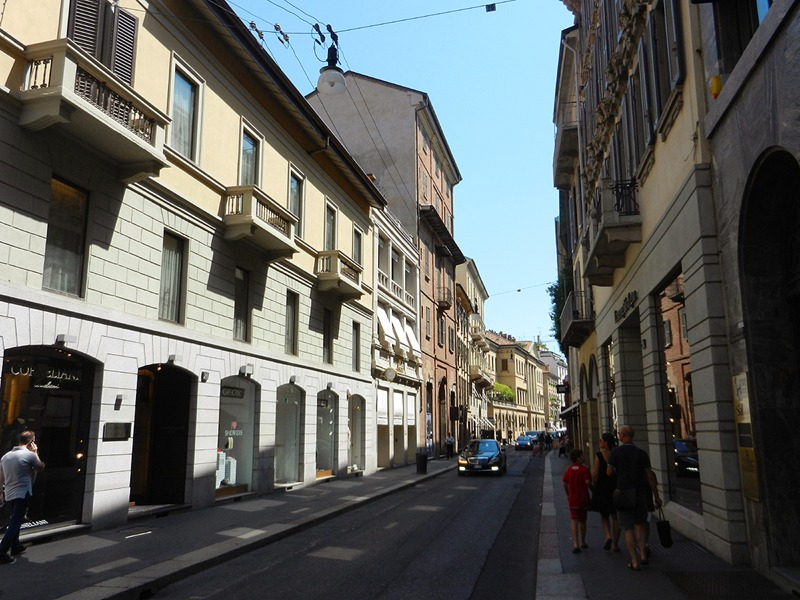
Via Monte Napoleone

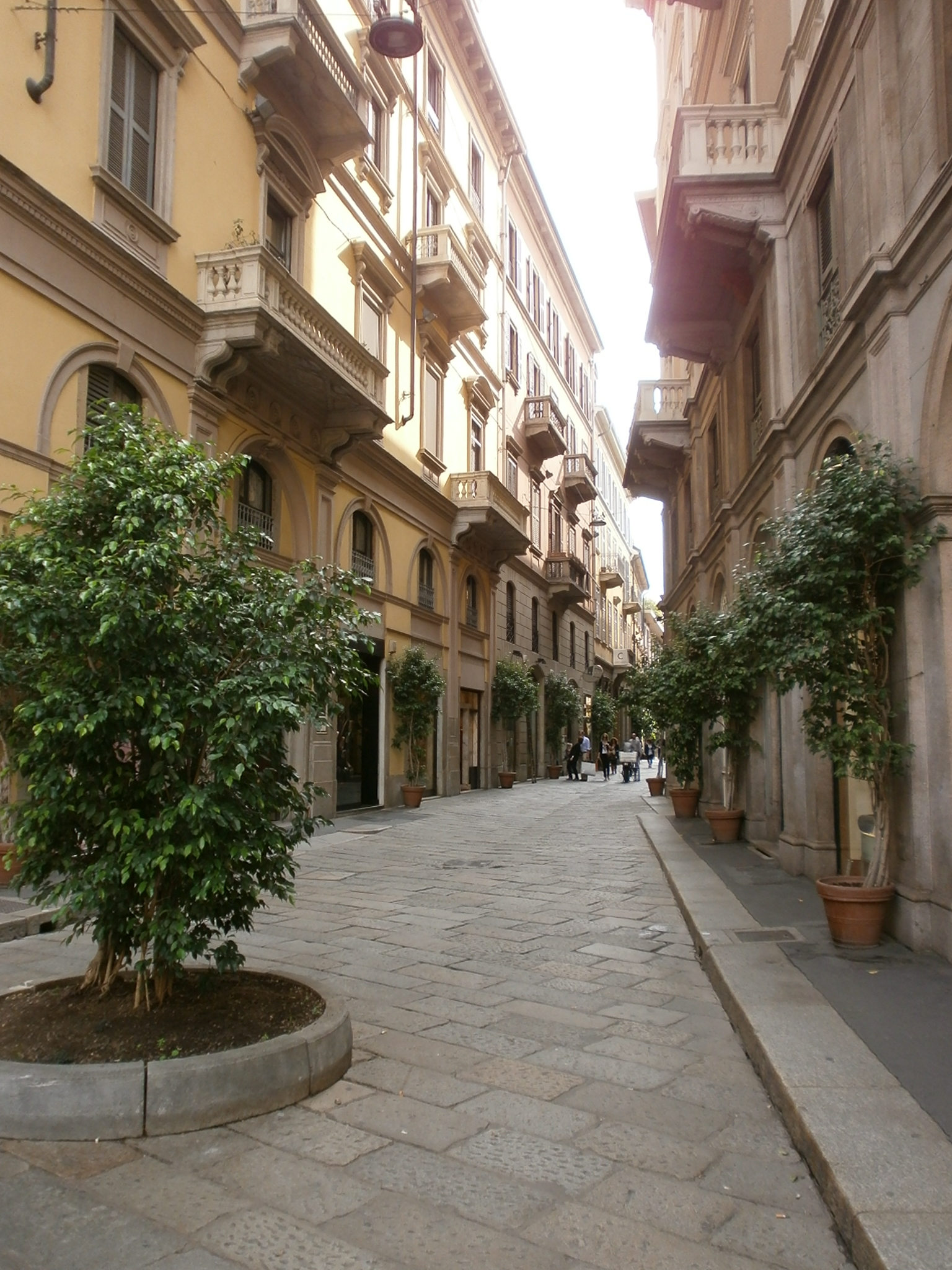
Via della Spiga
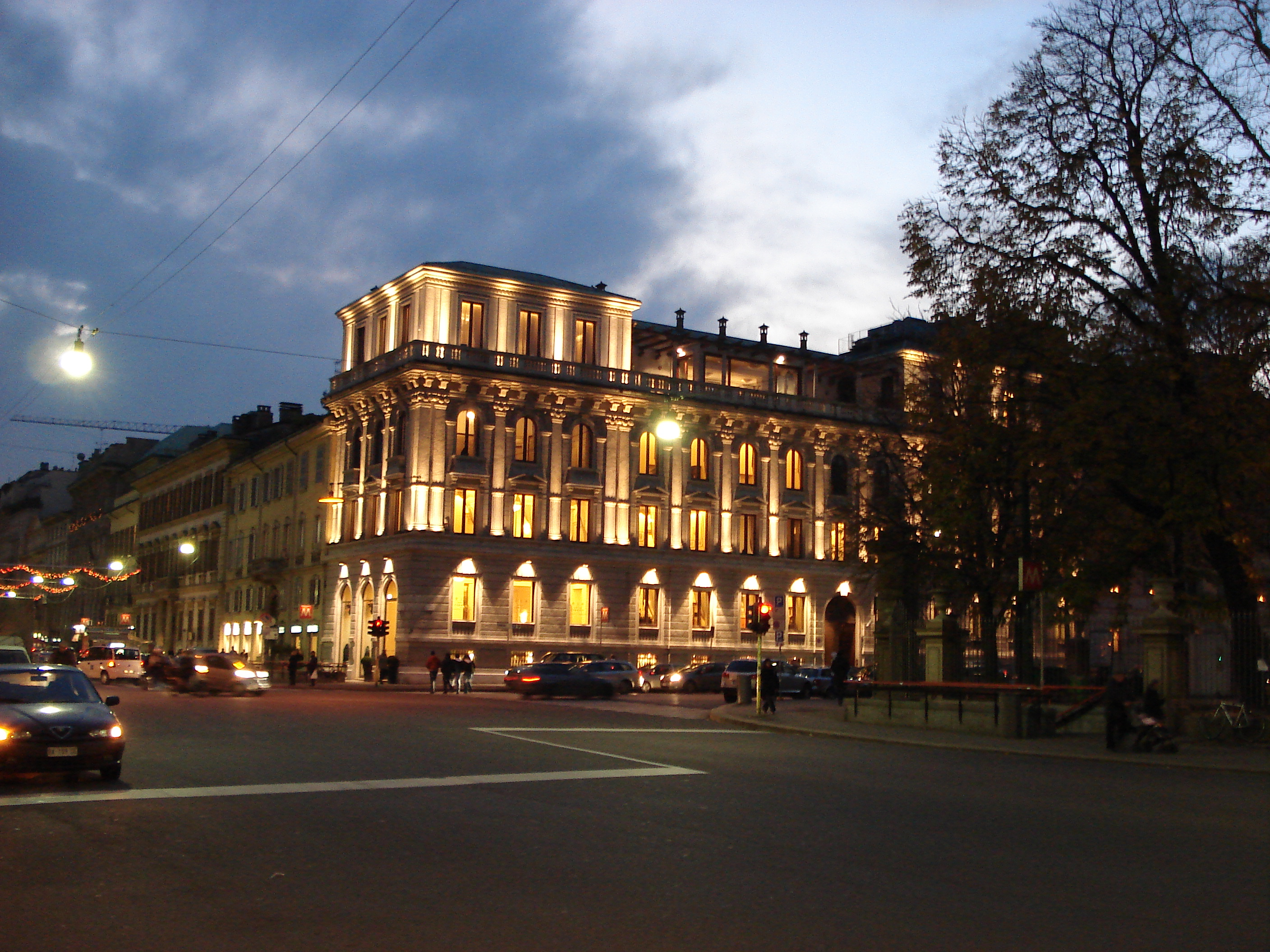
Corso Venezia

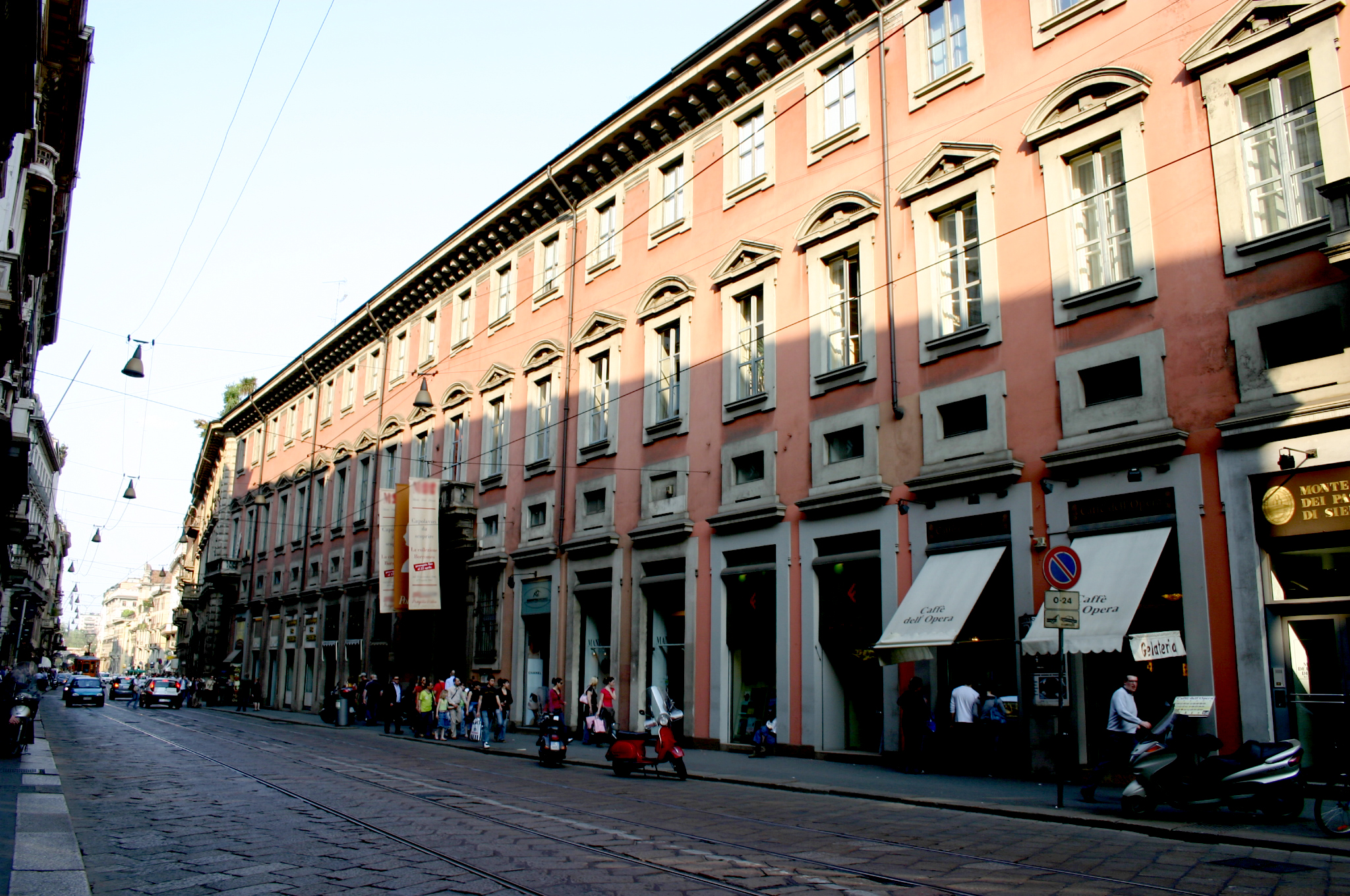
Via Manzoni

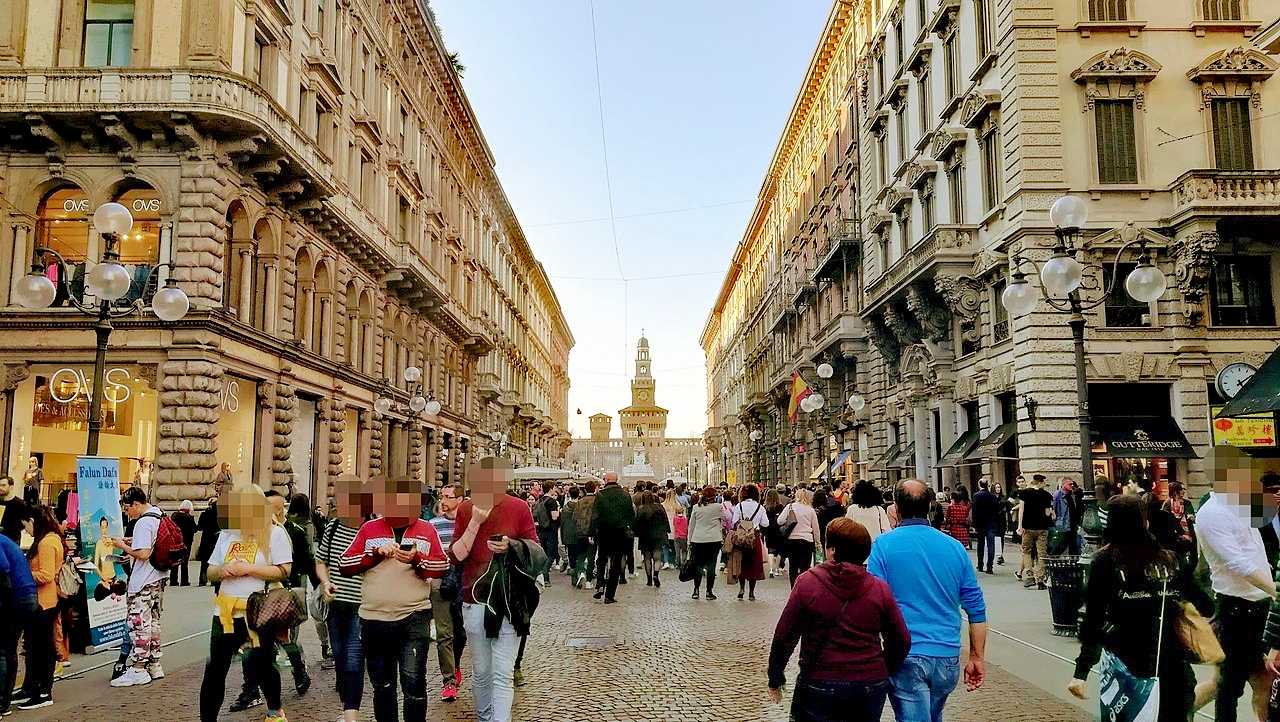
Via Dante

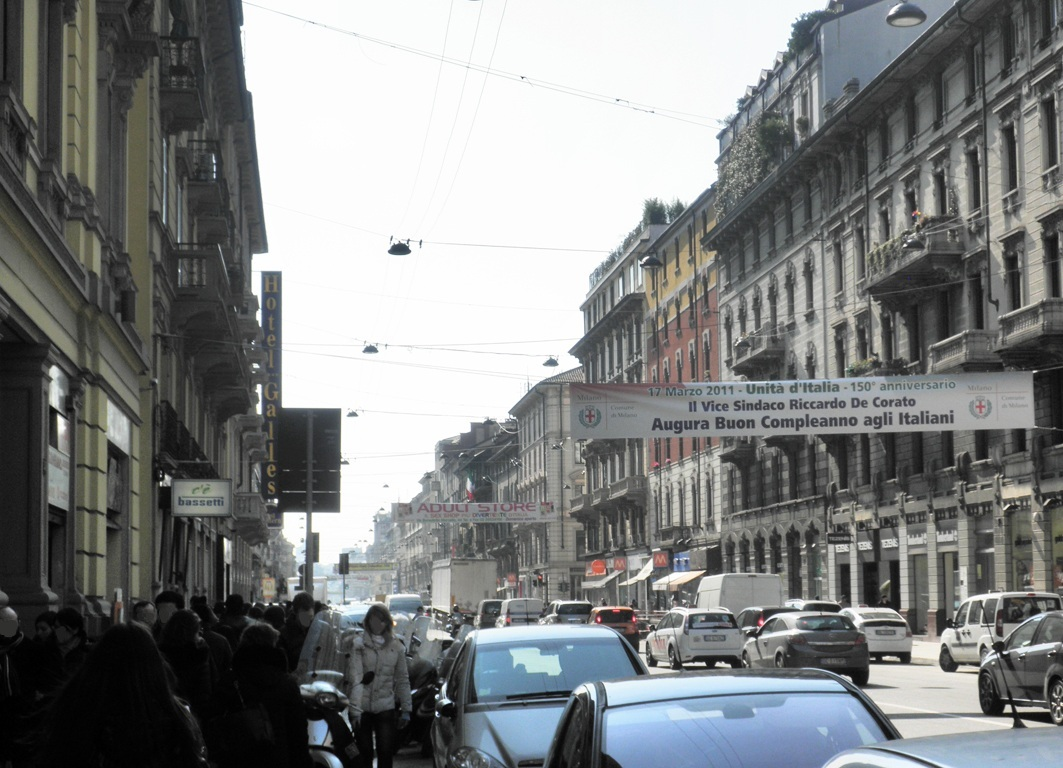
Corso Buenos Aires

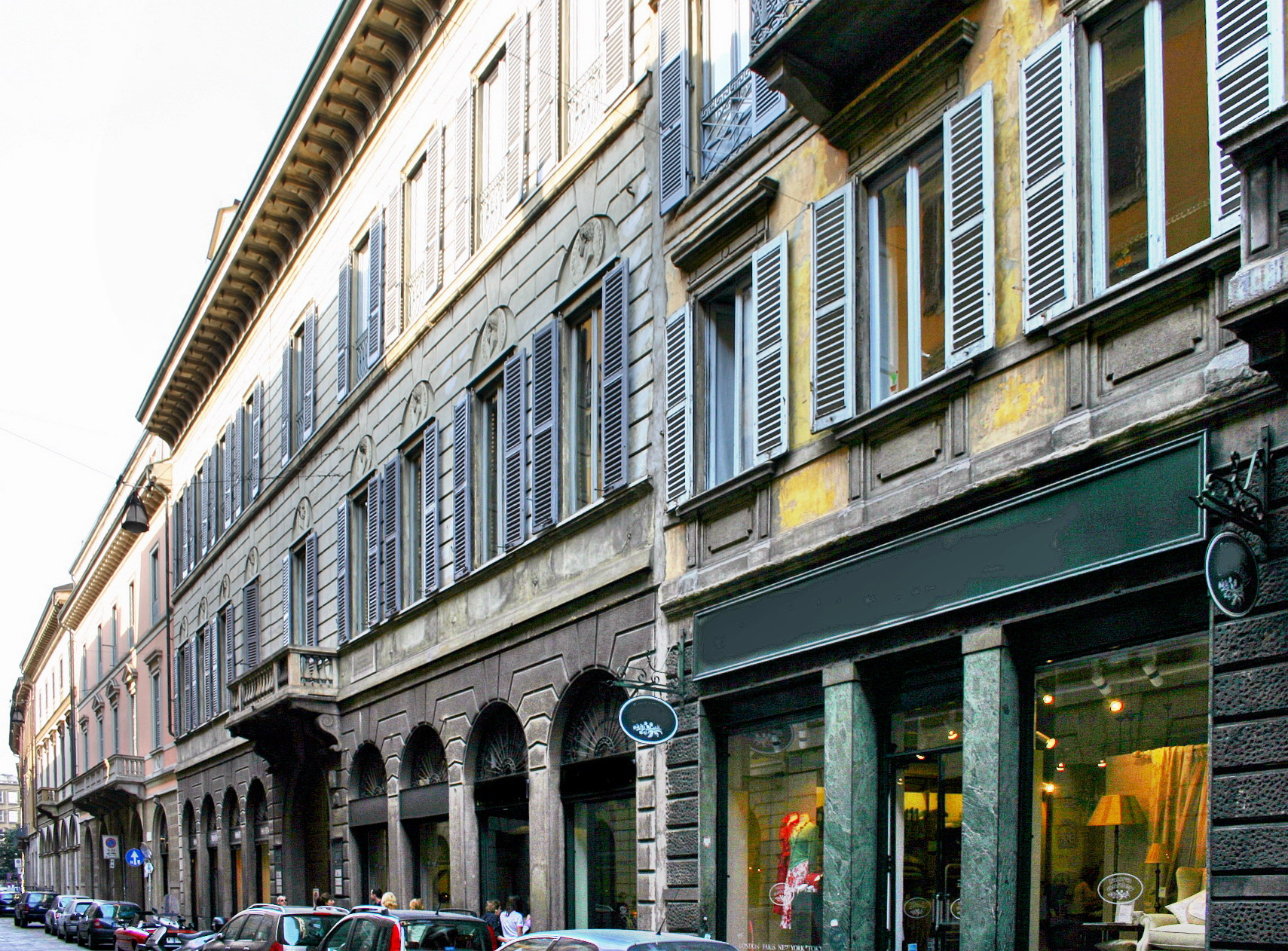
Brera

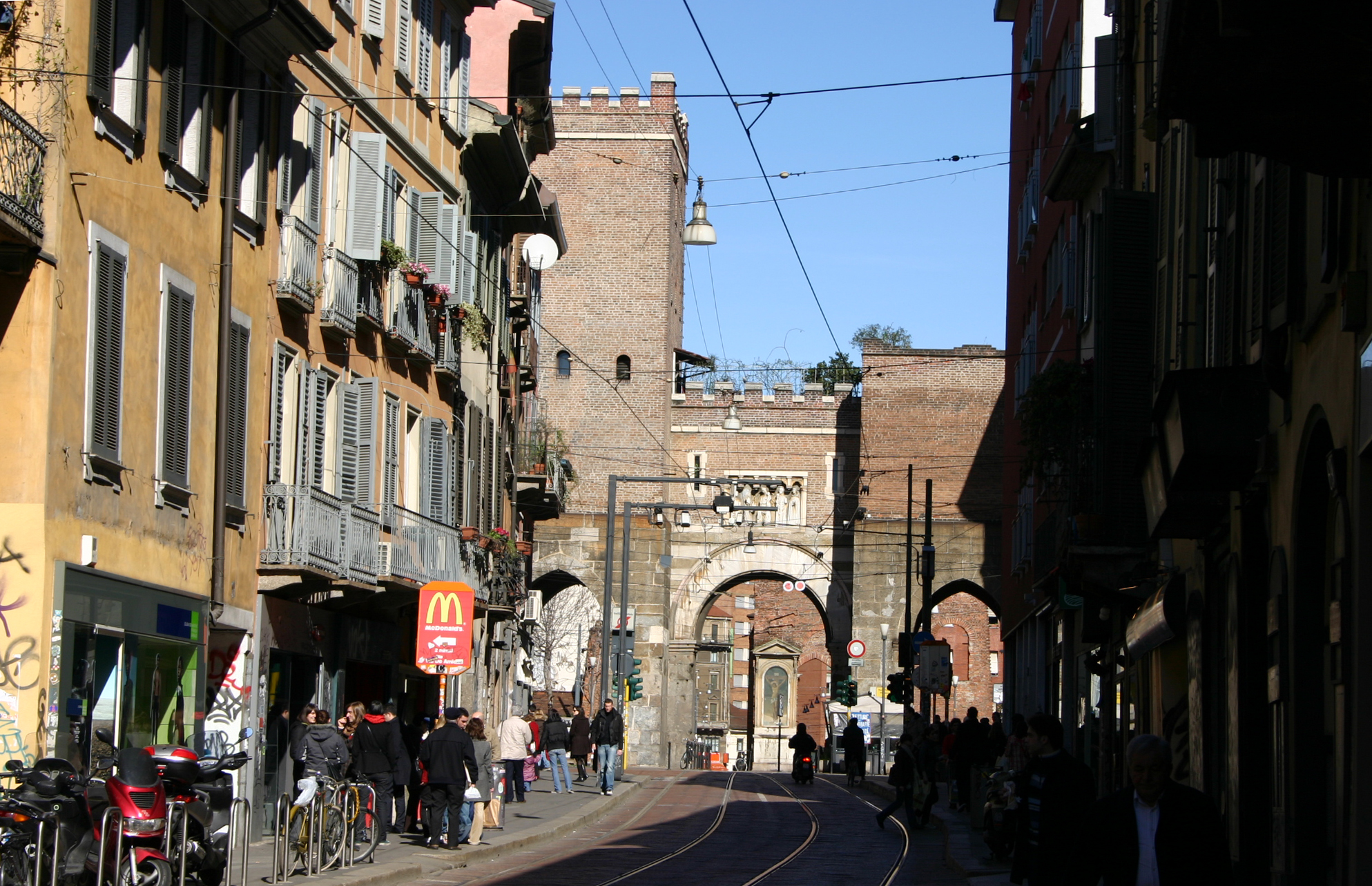
Corso di Porta Ticinese

== See also ==
- Fashion tourism
