= Garment (disambiguation) =

A garment is an article of clothing.

Garment may also refer to:

- Garment District (disambiguation)
- Temple garment, a type of underwear worn by adherents of the Latter Day Saint movement after they have taken part in the endowment ceremony.

== People with the surname ==
- Leonard Garment (1924–2013), American lawyer and arts advocate
