= Spiga =

Spiga may refer to:

- Kumonga
- Via della Spiga
- Spiga, a former name of Biga, Çanakkale, Turkey, a town and a former Latin Catholic titular bishopric
