= Fashion District =

Fashion District may refer to:

- Fashion District (Los Angeles)
- Fashion District, Toronto
- Fashion District, New York City
- Fashion District Philadelphia

== See also ==
- Wynwood Fashion District, sub-district of Wynwood in Miami
- Quadrilatero della moda, Milan
- Garment District (disambiguation)
