= Via Sant'Andrea =

Street in Milan, Italy

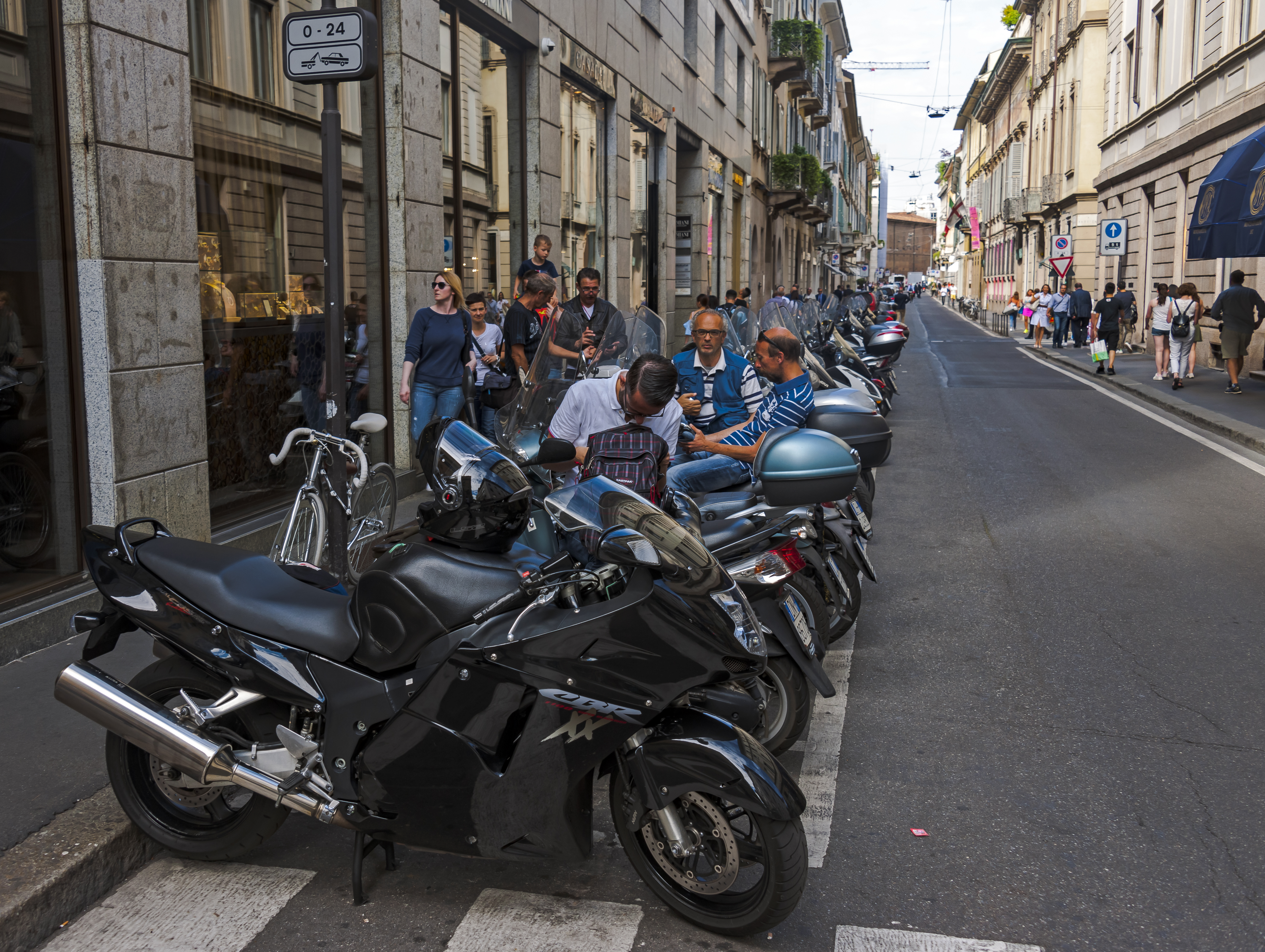
The Via Sant'Andrea north of the Via Montenapoleone

Via Sant'Andrea is a luxury shopping street in Milan, Italy, forming part of the quadrilatero della moda, along with Via Montenapoleone, Via della Spiga, Via Manzoni and Corso Venezia.

== Shops ==
Some shops on Via Sant'Andrea include:

- Armani
- Banner (women's wear)
- Bottega Veneta
- Cesare Paciotti
- Chanel
- Church's
- Costume National
- Damiani (jewelry company)
- Fendi
- Gianfranco Ferré
- Giorgio Armani
- Givenchy
- Hermès
- Kenzo
- Michael Kors
- Missoni
- Miu Miu
- Moschino
- Roger Vivier
- Trussardi
- Viktor & Rolf

== See also ==
- Dress code
- Fifth Avenue
