= Garment District =

Garment District may refer to:

- Garment District (Los Angeles)
- Garment District, Manhattan
- Garment District, Montreal
- Garment District (Kansas City, Missouri)
- Garment District (clothing retailer), Cambridge, Massachusetts
- Garment District, Philadelphia
- Garment District, Toronto

== See also ==
- Fashion District (disambiguation)
- Fashion in Milan
- Savile Row in London
