= Corso Venezia =

Street in Milan, Italy

Coordinates: 45.4727°N 9.2033°E

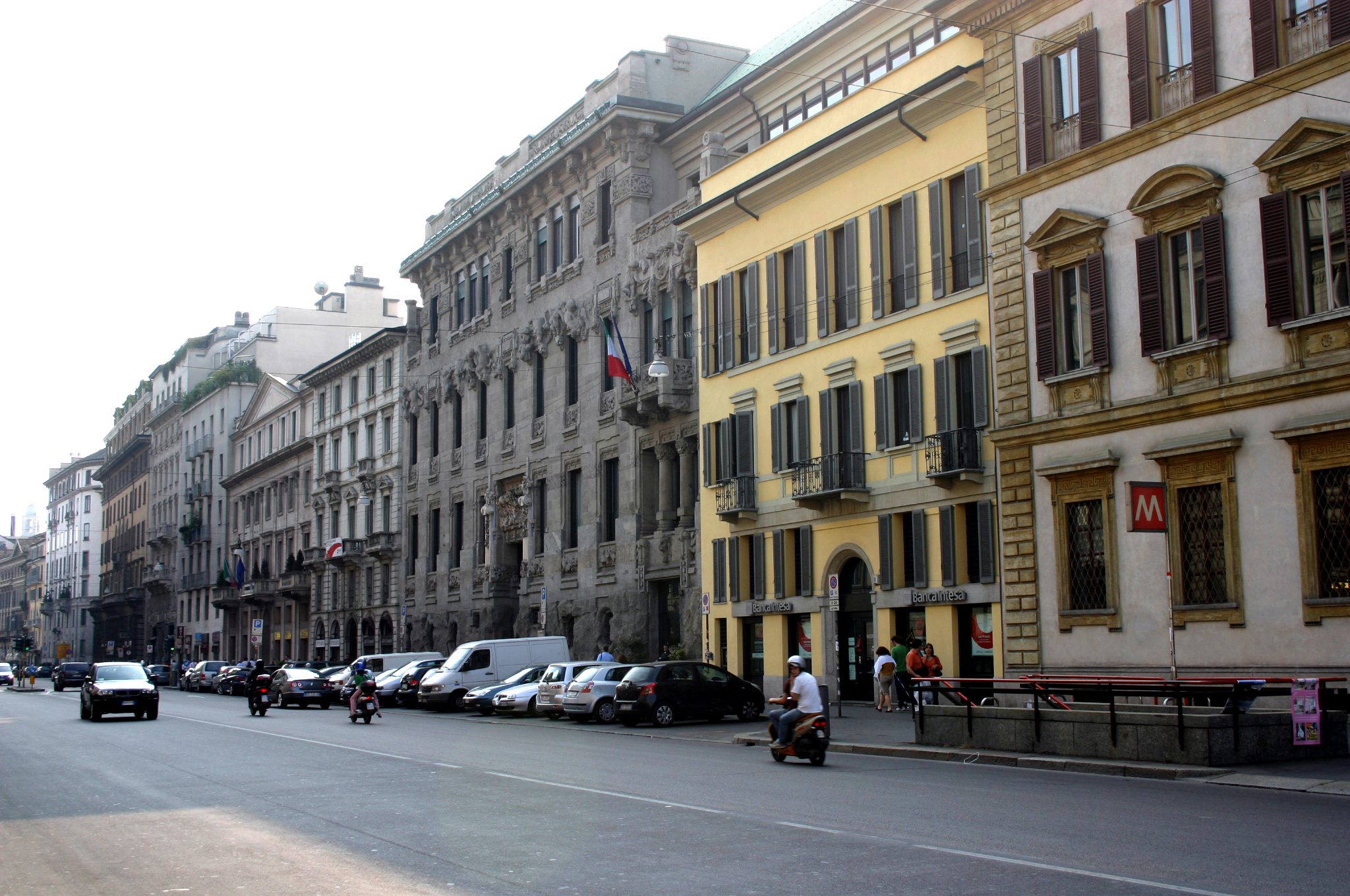
Corso Venezia

Corso Venezia is a street in Milan, Italy. It is one of the city's most exclusive and elegant avenues, being part of the city's upscale Quadrilatero della moda shopping district, along with Via Montenapoleone, Via della Spiga, Via Sant'Andrea and Via Manzoni. It also boasts a great collection of Renaissance, Baroque, Rococo and Neo-classical palaces, parks and gardens.

== Shops ==
- Armani
- Braccialini
- Brooksfield
- Burberry
- C.P. Company
- Dolce & Gabbana Man
- Dolce & Gabbana
- Diesel
- Diesel Kids
- Dodo-Pomellato
- Liu Jo
- M Missoni
- Marlboro Classic
- Miu Miu
- Nero Giardini
- Nomination
- Paola Frani
- Paolo Tonali
- Pavillon Christofle
- Pinko
- Prada
- Stone Island
- Vivienne Westwood
- Wolford

== Palaces, Gardens and Parks ==
The street contains several important (notably Baroque and Neoclassical, but also Medieval and Renaissance), such as the Palazzo Serbelloni and the Villa Reale, found in the landscaped Giardini Pubblici of the street. In the Giardini Pubblici there is also the Museo Civico di Storia Naturale di Milano, which was founded in 1838 when Giuseppe de Cristoforis (1803–1837) donated his collections to the city. Its first director was Giorgio Jan (1791–1866).

== Gallery ==
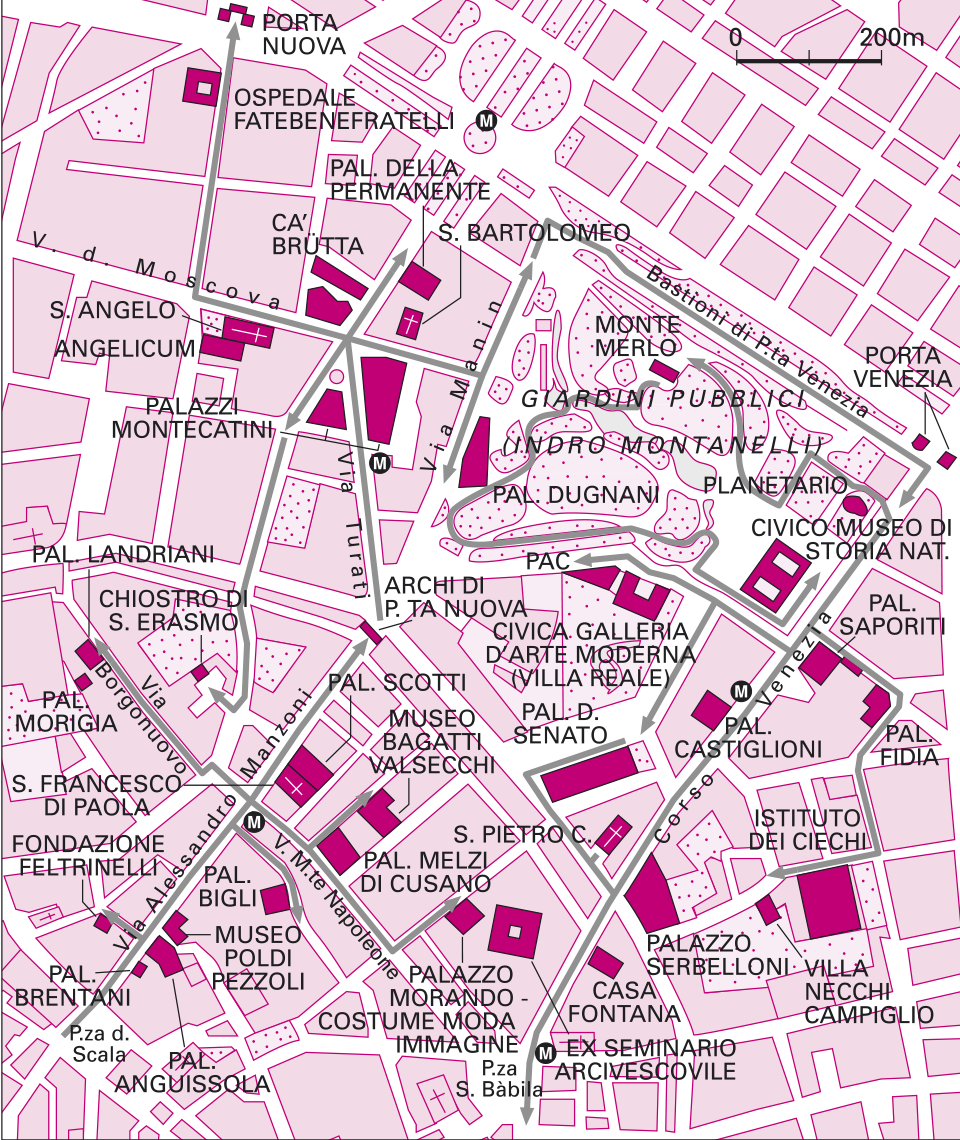
Map of the northeastern quadrant of Milan city centre. via Manzoni and corso Venezia

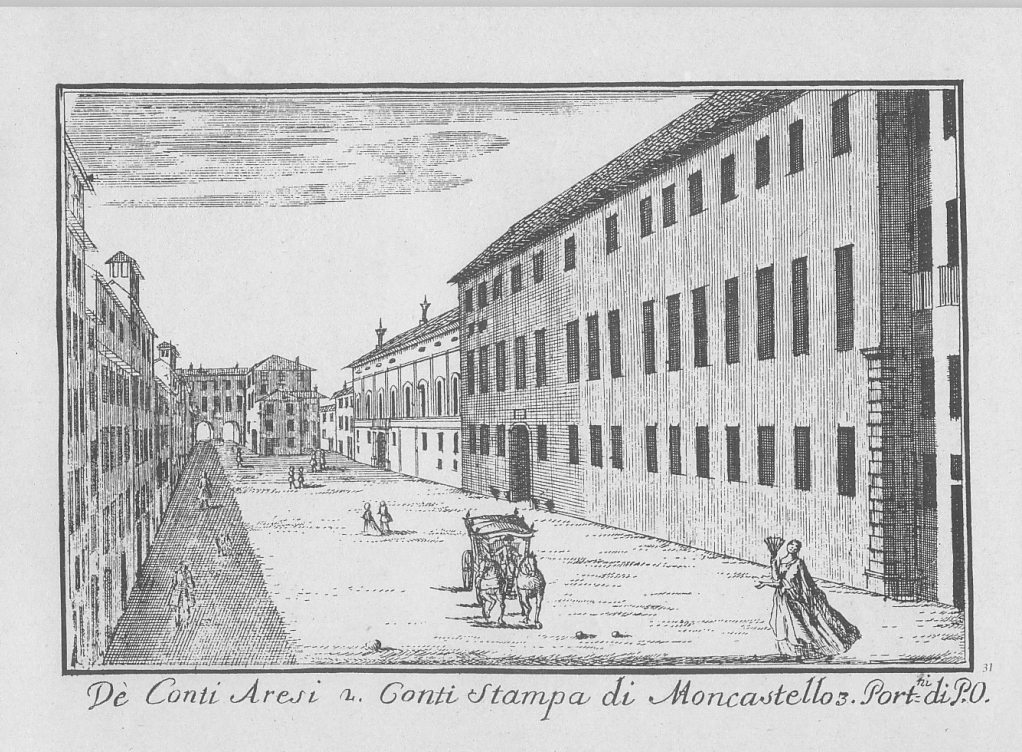
Palazzo Arese (demolished) and Corso Venezia in 1745

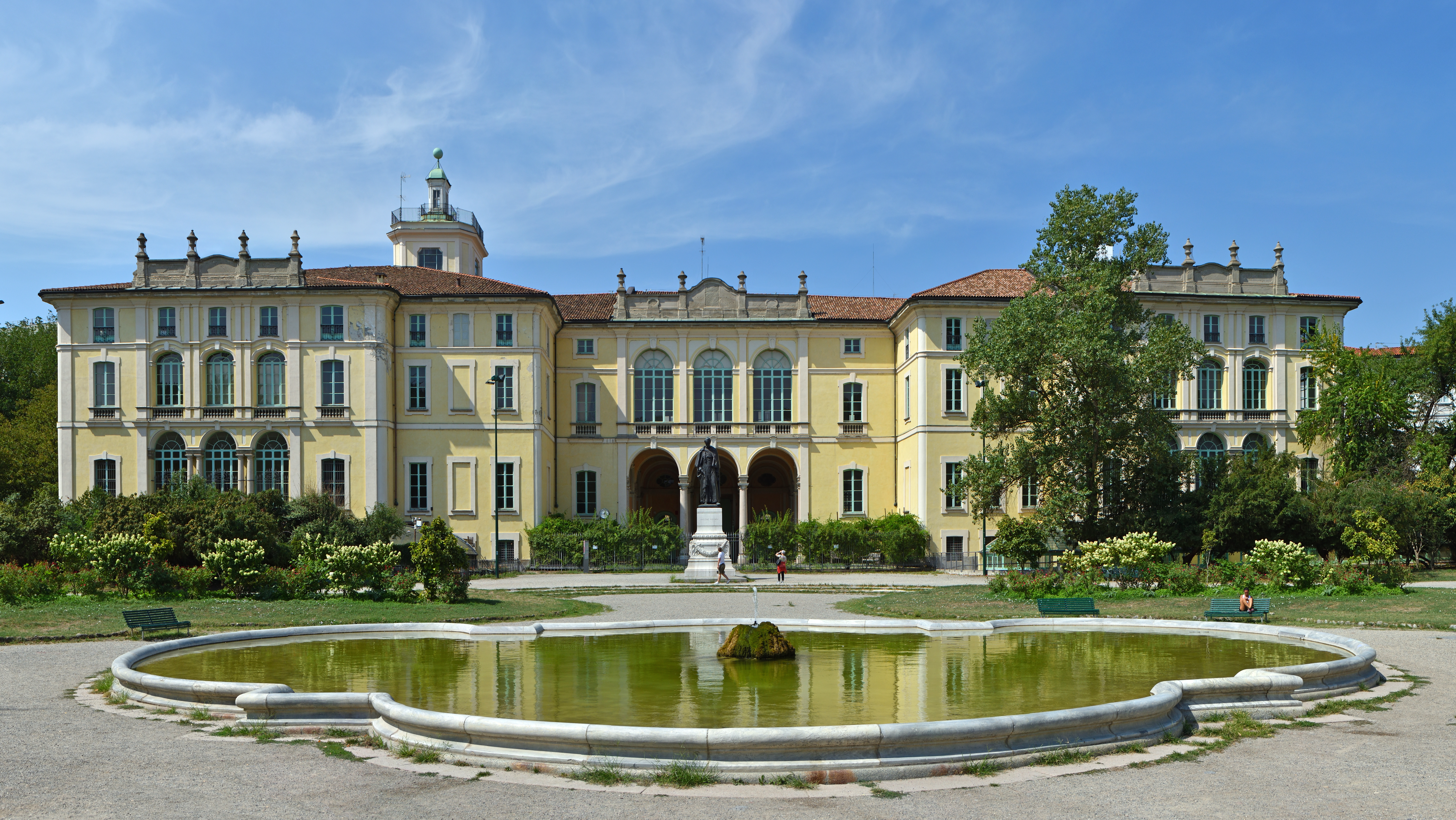
Palazzo Dugnani in Giardini Pubblici Indro Montanelli

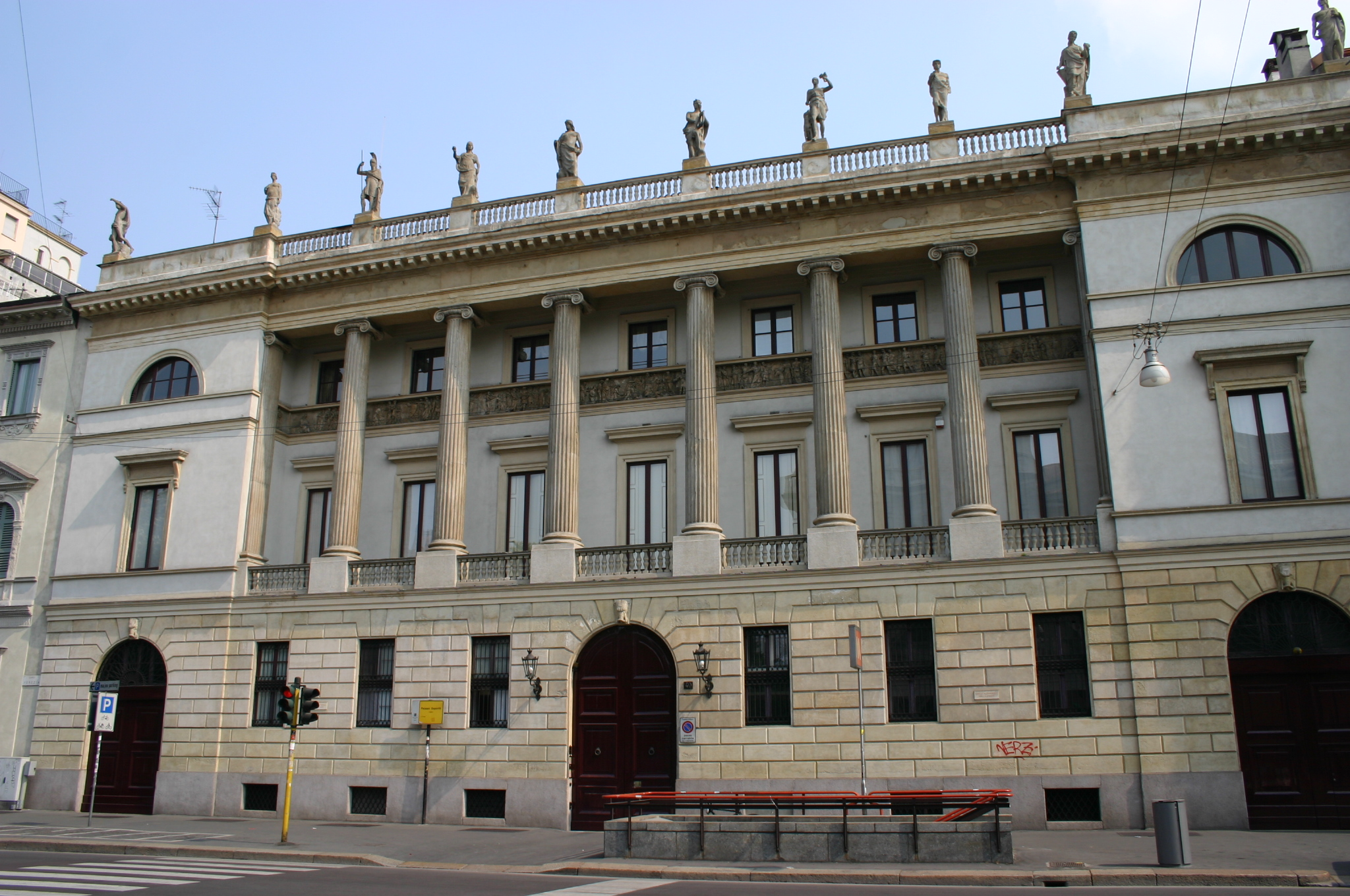
Palazzo Saporiti

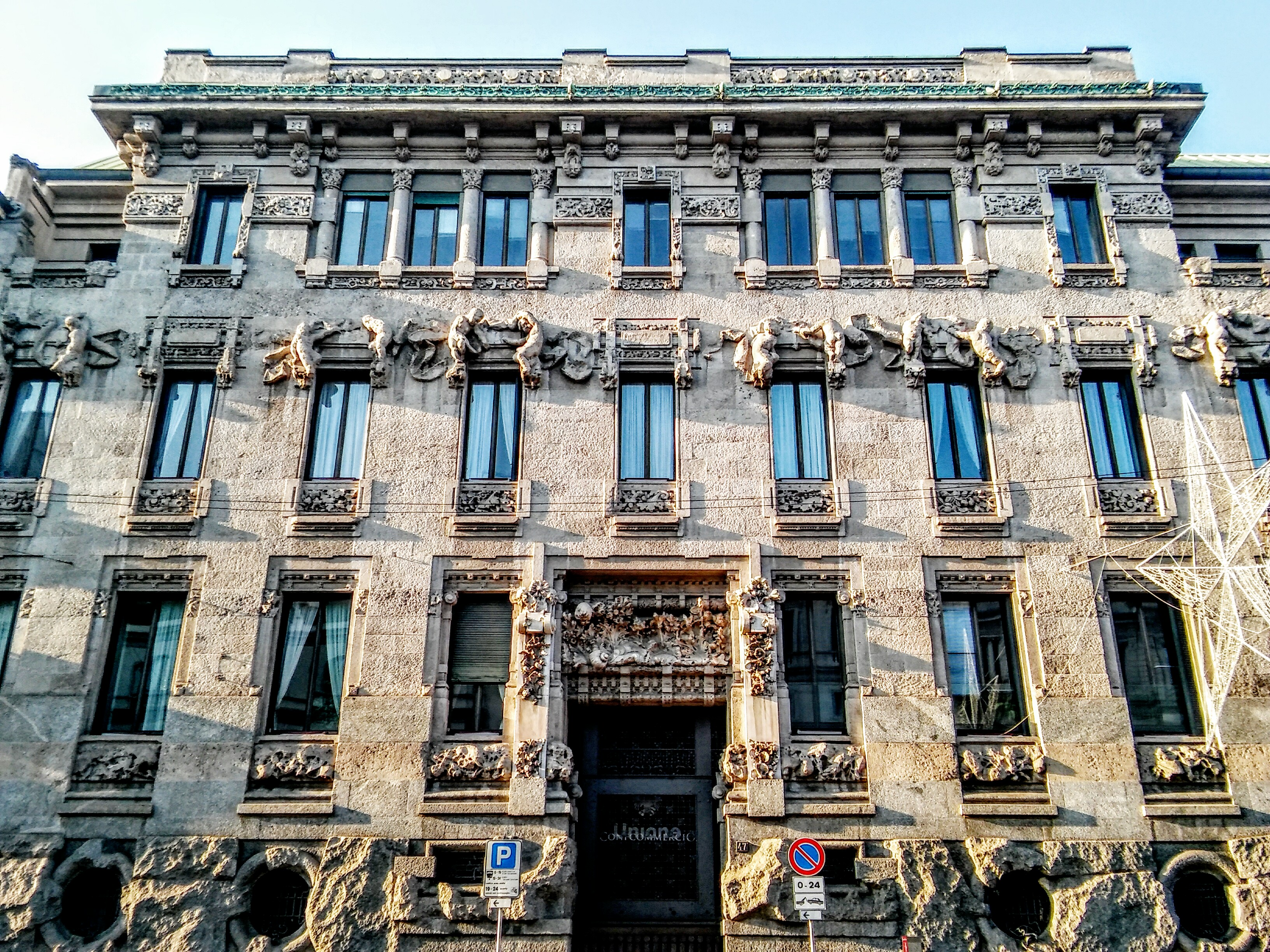
The Art Nouveau Palazzo Castiglioni

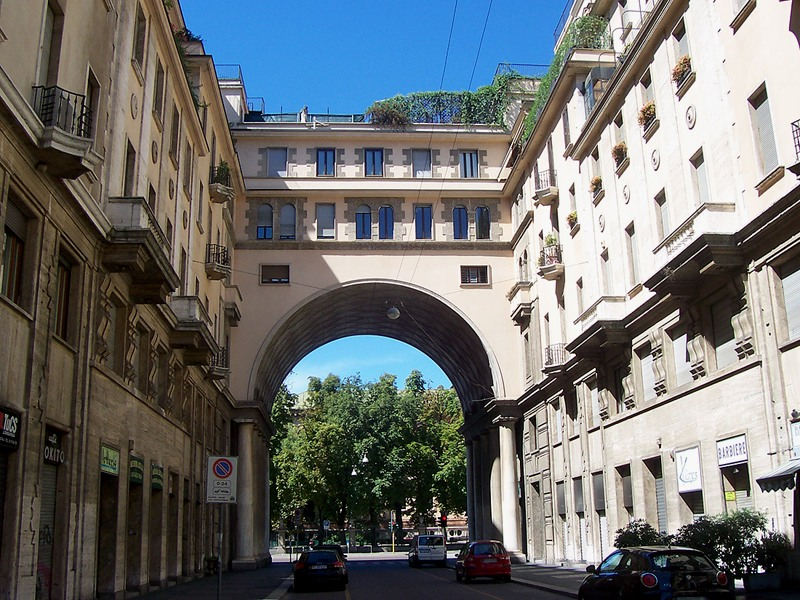
Palazzo della società Buonarroti-Carpaccio-Giotto
