= Via della Spiga =

Street in Milan

Coordinates: 45°28′N 9°12′E

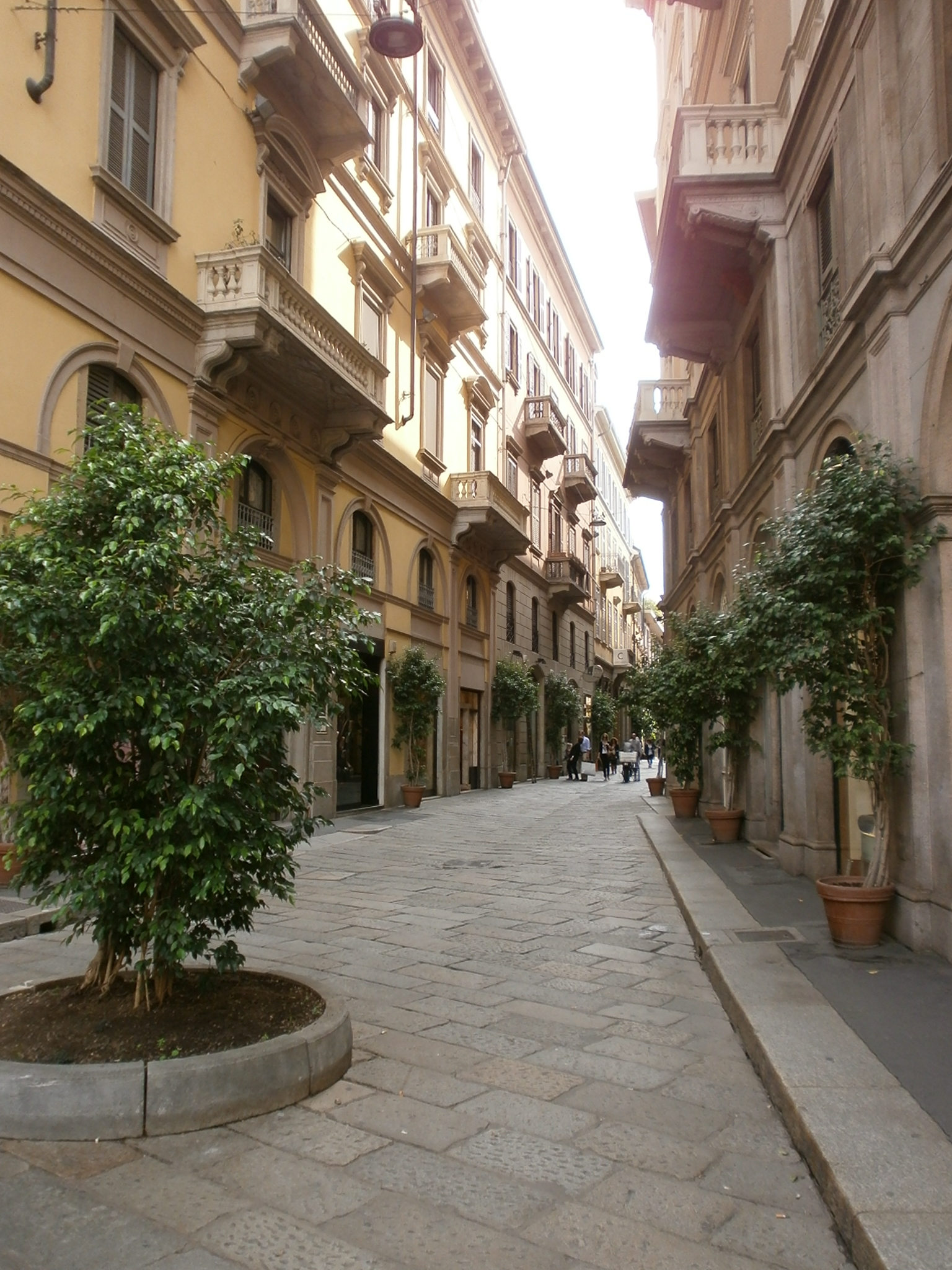
Via della Spiga is a pedestrian zone

Via della Spiga (Italian pronunciation: [ˈviːa della ˈspiːɡa]; literally "Alley of the Ear") is one of the Italian city of Milan's top shopping streets, forming the north-east boundary of the luxurious Quadrilatero della Moda (literally, "fashion quadrilateral"), along with Via Monte Napoleone, Via Manzoni, Via Sant'Andrea and Corso Venezia. The first Versace boutique opened on Via della Spiga in 1978.
