= Garment District (clothing retailer) =

American retailer

The Garment District
- Type: Vintage clothing store
- Headquarters: Cambridge, Massachusetts

The Garment District is a clothing retailer in Cambridge, Massachusetts that houses an eclectic array of vintage and contemporary apparel as well as Boston Costume, a rental and retail costume shop. The Garment District labels itself "An Alternative Department Store", and is also known for its By The Pound (currently $2 a pound) clothing section.

== History ==
The Garment District began as an offshoot of Harbor Textile Waste Company, which was founded in the 1940s and supplied "wiping cloths" (i.e., rags) to smokestack industries, such as sugar manufacturing. Around 1980 (sources differ), as demand for used clothing began to rise, Dollar-A-Pound was opened, where, on Saturdays, one could buy clothing by weight. Instead of cutting up garments for wiping cloths, they were now sold as fashion, though without racks or price tags. At that time, finding large quantities of vintage 1940s and '50s clothing at Dollar-A-Pound was commonplace.

In 1986, as demand for used and vintage clothing continued to rise, The Garment District was born. Today, the store runs seven days a week, selling new, used, and vintage clothing, shoes, and accessories on traditional-style racks; renting and selling costumes and accessories; and operating By The Pound (affectionately known as "the pile"). Hundreds of thousands of pounds of clothing are still sorted on site.

In 2004, The Garment District was under threat of closure as pressure to turn its buildings into residential condos nearly succeeded. However, with help from the City of Cambridge, among others, The Garment District was able to acquire the buildings.

In 2007, The Garment District merged with Boston Costume, which formerly operated in Boston's Chinatown. Boston Costume outfitted the Boston Bruins for their NHL Stadium Series Walk-In in Tampa, Florida, on February 1, 2026.
