= Quadrilatero della moda =

Shopping district in Milan, Italy

Coordinates: 45.469898°N 9.195342°E

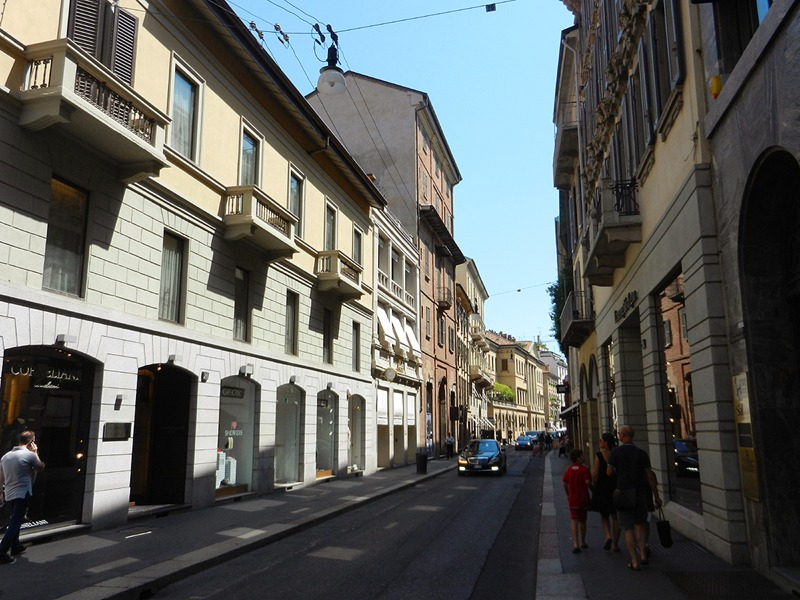
Via Monte Napoleone in Milan, the most expensive street in the world (2024). It is famous for its ready-to-wear fashion and jewelry shops, and for being the most important street of the Milan fashion district known as the Quadrilatero della moda, where many well-known fashion designers have high-end boutiques. The most exclusive Italian shoemakers maintain boutiques on this street.

The Quadrilatero della moda (Italian pronunciation: [kwadriˈlaːtero della ˈmɔːda]; literally "fashion square"), or Via Montenapoleone fashion district, is a shopping district in the centre of the Italian city of Milan. Shops there include both Italian fashion and international brands.

The sides of the square, located to the south of the arches of Porta Nuova, are formed by Via Montenapoleone (SW), Via Manzoni (NW), Via della Spiga (NE), and Corso Venezia (SE).

Streets inside this area include Via Borgospesso, Via Santo Spirito, Via Gesù, Via Sant'Andrea, Via Bagutta, and Via Baggutino. The zone extends in practice also to the north-west of Via Manzoni with Via Pisoni, and to the south and west of Via Montenapoleone with Corso Giacomo Matteotti (this last meets Corso Venezia at Piazza San Babila), Piazza Meda, Via San Pietro all'Orto, and Via Verri.

== Streets and squares ==
=== Corso Giacomo Matteotti ===
Fashion shops include:

- Abercrombie & Fitch

=== Piazza Meda ===
Fashion shops include:

- Hugo Boss
- Calvin Klein

=== Piazza San Babila ===
Fashion shops include:

- Bagatt
- Boggi
- Guess
- Gusella
- Nadine
- North Sails
- Sisley
- Valextra

=== Via Bigli ===
- Scappino

=== Via Borgospesso ===
Fashion shops include:

- Altomani & Sons
- Andrea Pfister
- Antichità Silbernagl
- Cyrus Company
- daDriade
- Galleria Silva
- Giuliano Fujiwara
- Laura Biagiotti
- Pinco Pallino
- Tween DdM
- Versace Homme

=== Via Montenapoleone ===
- Gianfranco Lotti

=== Via Pisoni ===
Fashion shops include:

- Armani Casa
- Armani Privè
- Poltrona Frau

=== Via San Pietro all'Orto ===
Fashion shops include:

- Jimmy Choo
- Bagutta

=== Via Sant'Andrea ===
Restelli Guanti

=== Via Santo Spirito ===
Fashion shops include:

- Borbonese
- Balenciaga
- Stella McCartney

=== Via Verri ===
Fashion shops include:

- Alexander McQueen
- Baldinini
- Berluti
- Burberry
- Canali
- DSquared²
- Etro Profumi
- Gucci
- Jil Sander
- John Richmond
- Nautica
- Oxford
- Tom Ford
- Zegna

== See also ==
- List of upscale shopping districts
