= Via Manzoni, Milan =

Street in Milan

Coordinates: 45°28′16″N 9°11′38″E

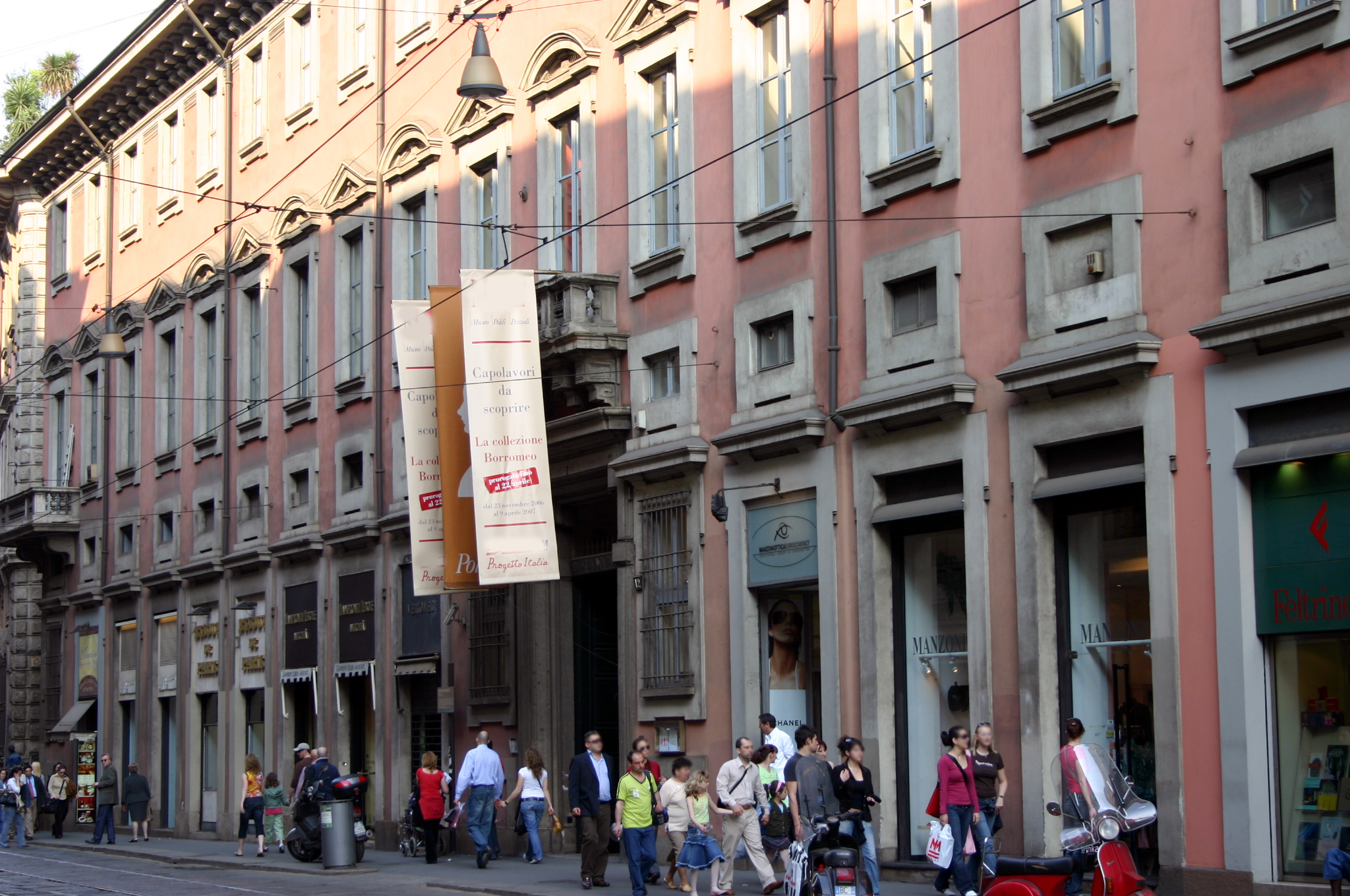
The Museo Poldi Pezzoli.

Via Manzoni is a busy and fashionable street in the Italian city of Milan, which leads from the Piazza della Scala north-west towards Piazza Cavour. Notable buildings include the Museo Poldi Pezzoli, the elegant Grand Hotel et de Milan, which was the place of Giuseppe Verdi’s death in 1901, and several fine palaces. Via Manzoni was originally called Corsia del Giardino before the crossroad with Via Monte Napoleone and Corso di Porta Nuova up until Piazza Cavour.

In 1990, when the Montenapoleone station was opened, a fountain designed by Aldo Rossi was placed in Via Croce Rossa, as a monument to Sandro Pertini.

== Museo Poldi Pezzoli ==
The Museo Poldi Pezzoli at Via Manzoni 12, which specialises in Northern Italian and Netherlandish/Flemish artists, originated as the private collection of Gian Giacomo Poldi Pezzoli, which he bequeathed to the city in 1879.

At Via Manzoni 12 was also the art gallery of Alexander Iolas.

== Fashion ==
A part of the street forms the approximate north-western boundary of the quadrilatero della moda, Milan’s up-market fashion district. Fashion retailers here include Anna Rita N, Antonini, Armani Casa, Artemide, Bolaffi, Bottega del Cashmere, Coccinelle, E. Marinella, Frette, Gattinoni, Grimoldi, Les Copains, Mila Schön, Napapjri, Pal Zileri, Patrizia Pepe, Paul Smith, Scappino and El Ganso.

== Gallery ==
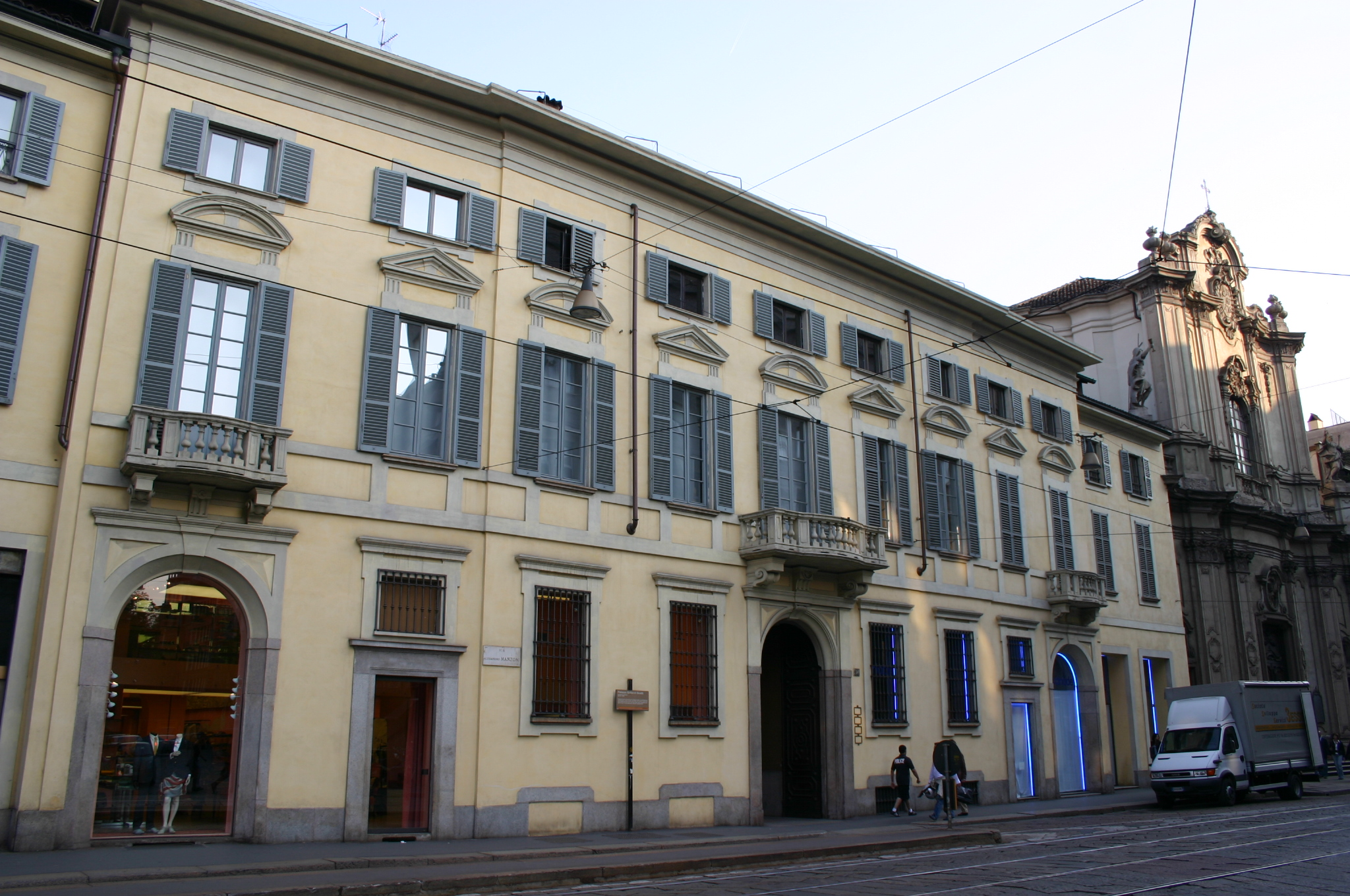
The late 17th-century Palazzo Gallarati-Scotti next to the church of San Francesco.

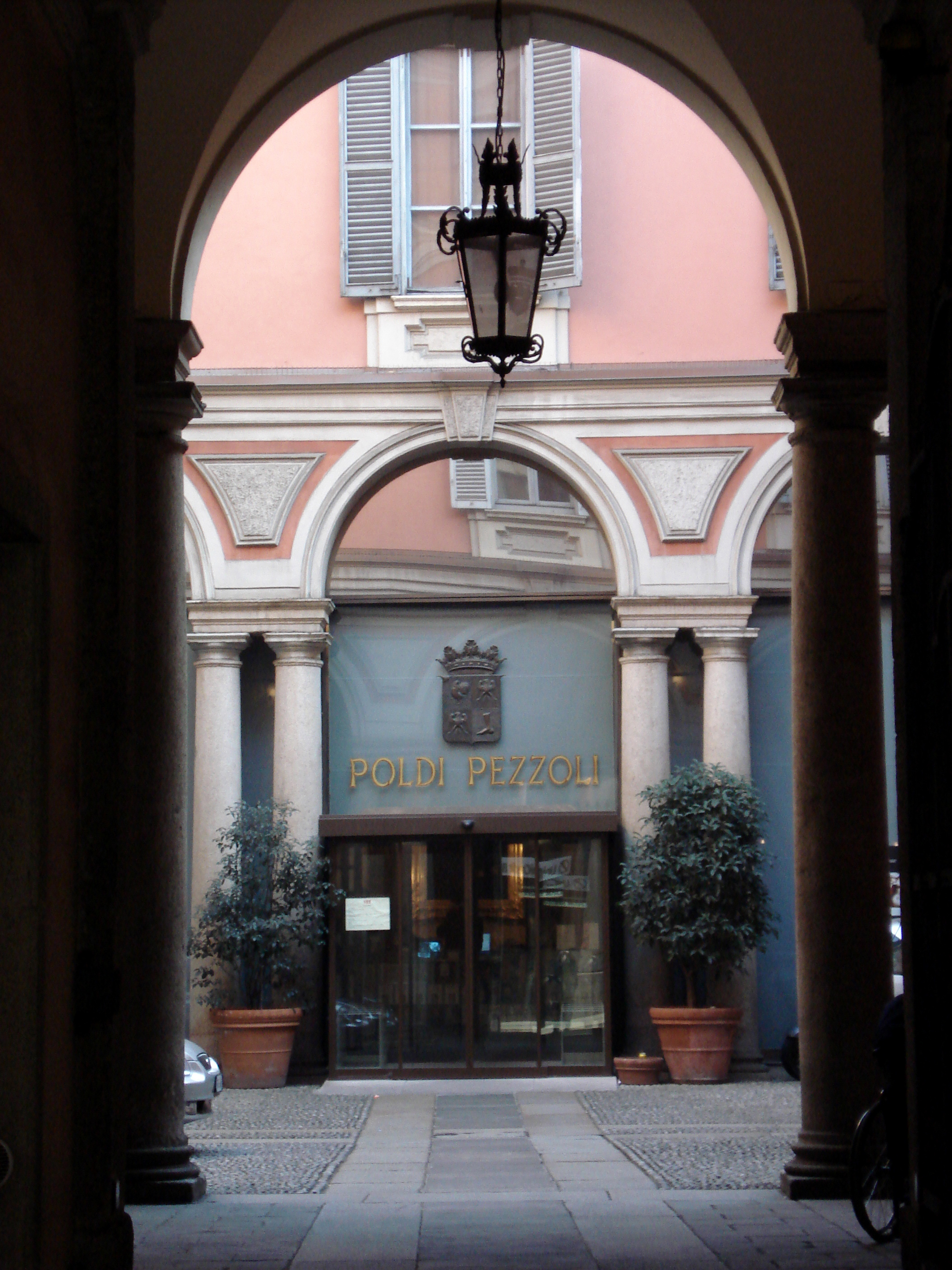
The museum courtyard.

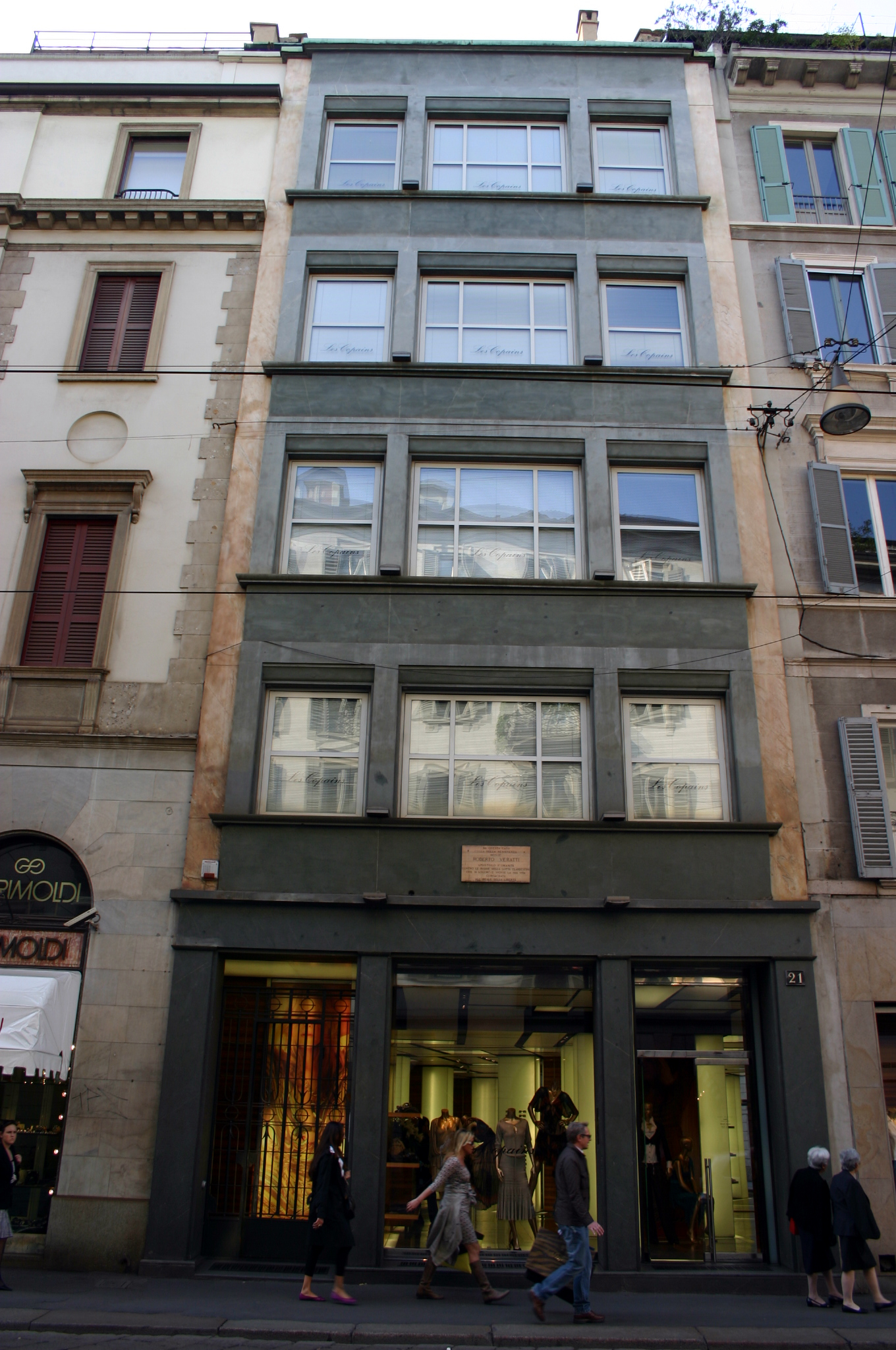
The home of the anti-fascist partisan Roberto Veratti now houses a boutique.

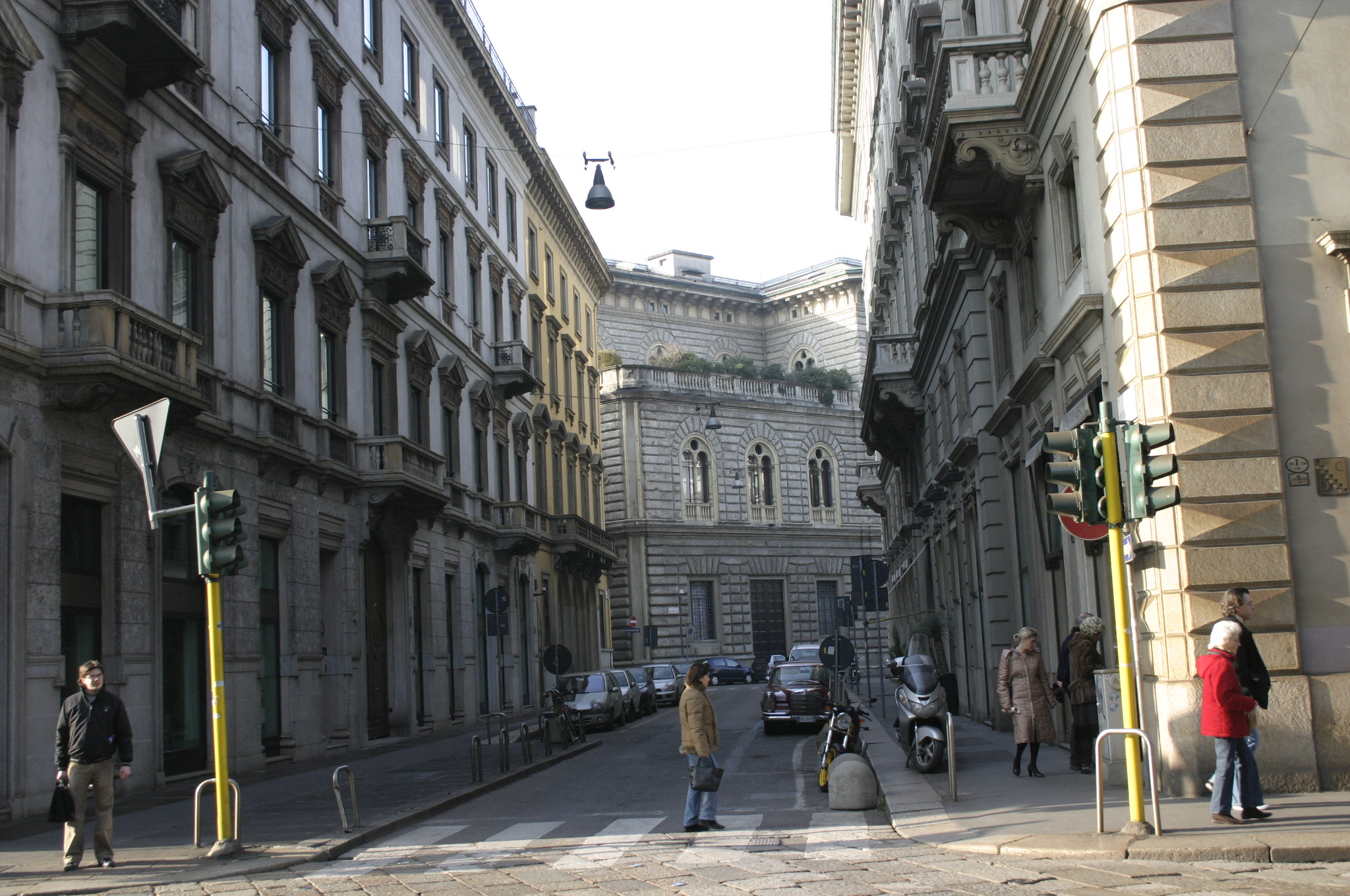
The Palazzo Ca’ de Sass, pictured from Via Manzoni

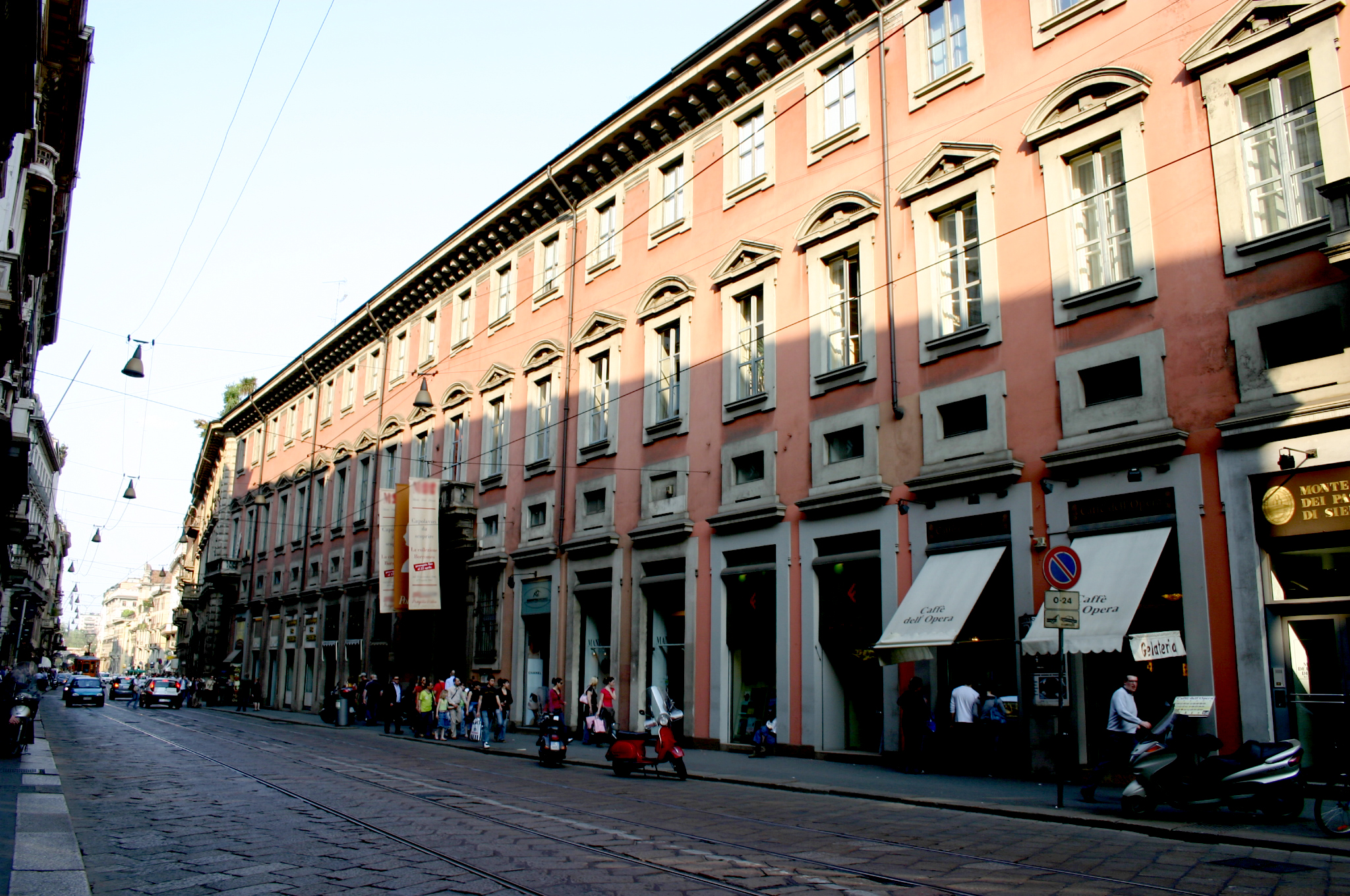
A view of the Via Manzoni, showing the Museo Poldi Pezzoli surrounded by several shops, such as the Caffe dell' Opera.

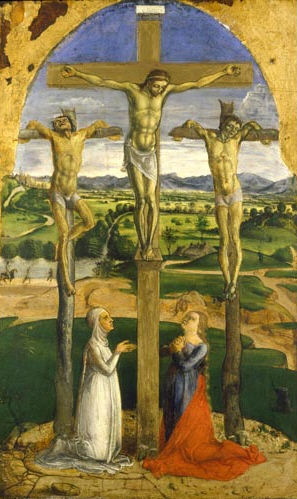
One of the many paintings found in the Museo.

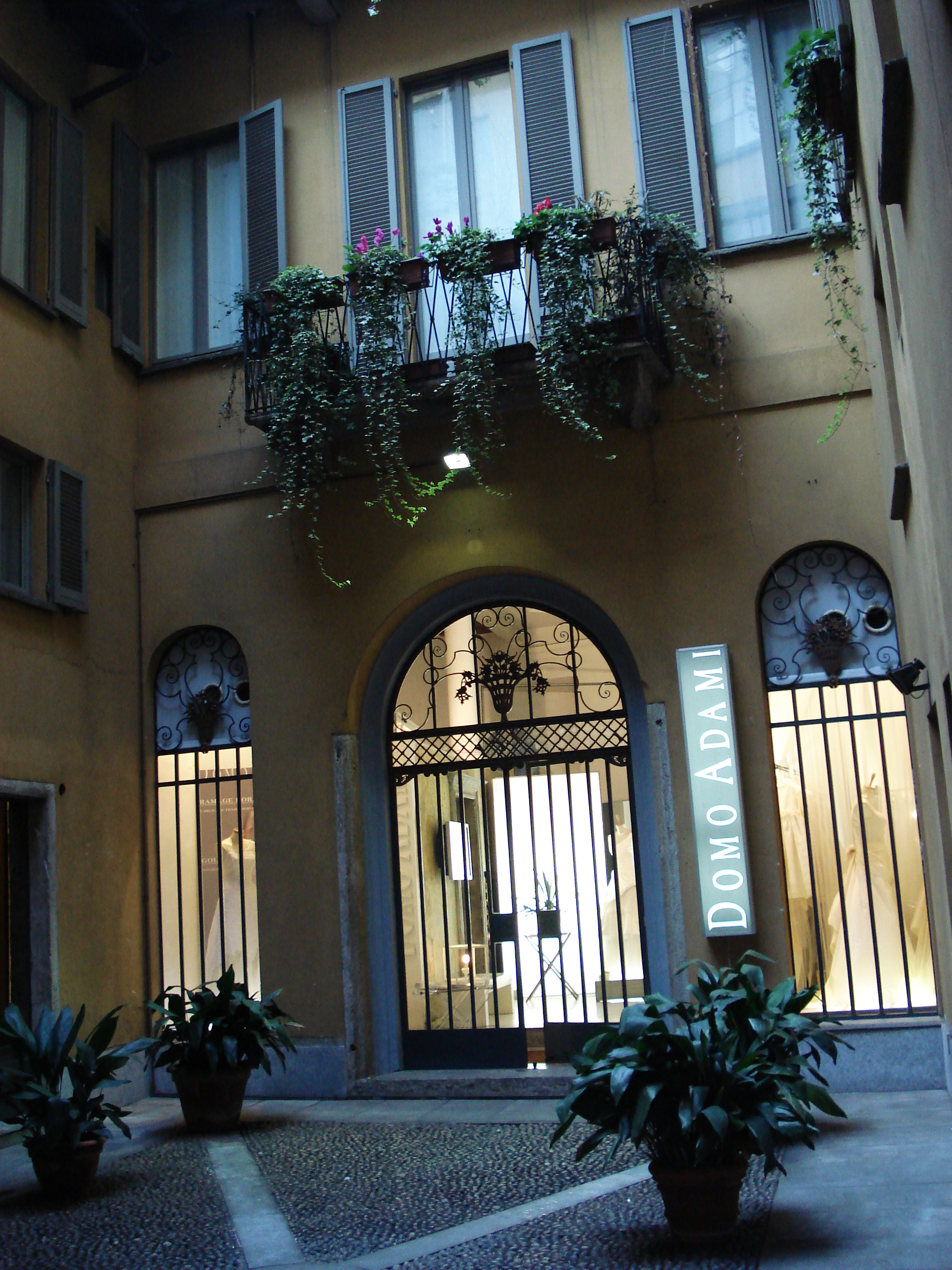
A courtyard showing a wedding-dress shop.

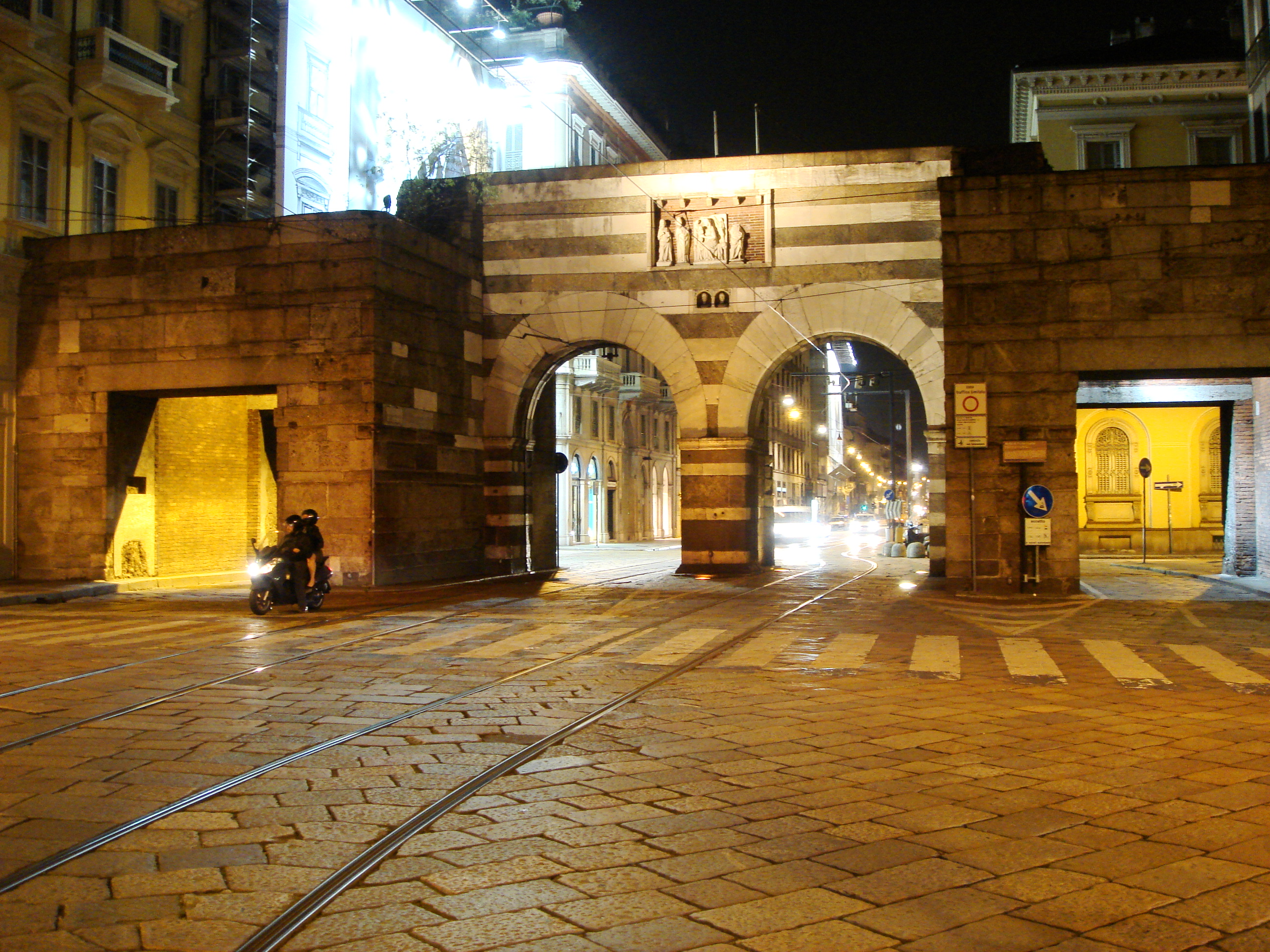
The ancient Porta Nuova gate which concludes the via.
