= 1838 in architecture =

The year 1838 in architecture involved some significant architectural events and new buildings.

== Buildings and structures ==
=== Buildings opened ===
- April 8 – The British National Gallery first opens to the public in the building purpose-designed for it by William Wilkins in Trafalgar Square, London.

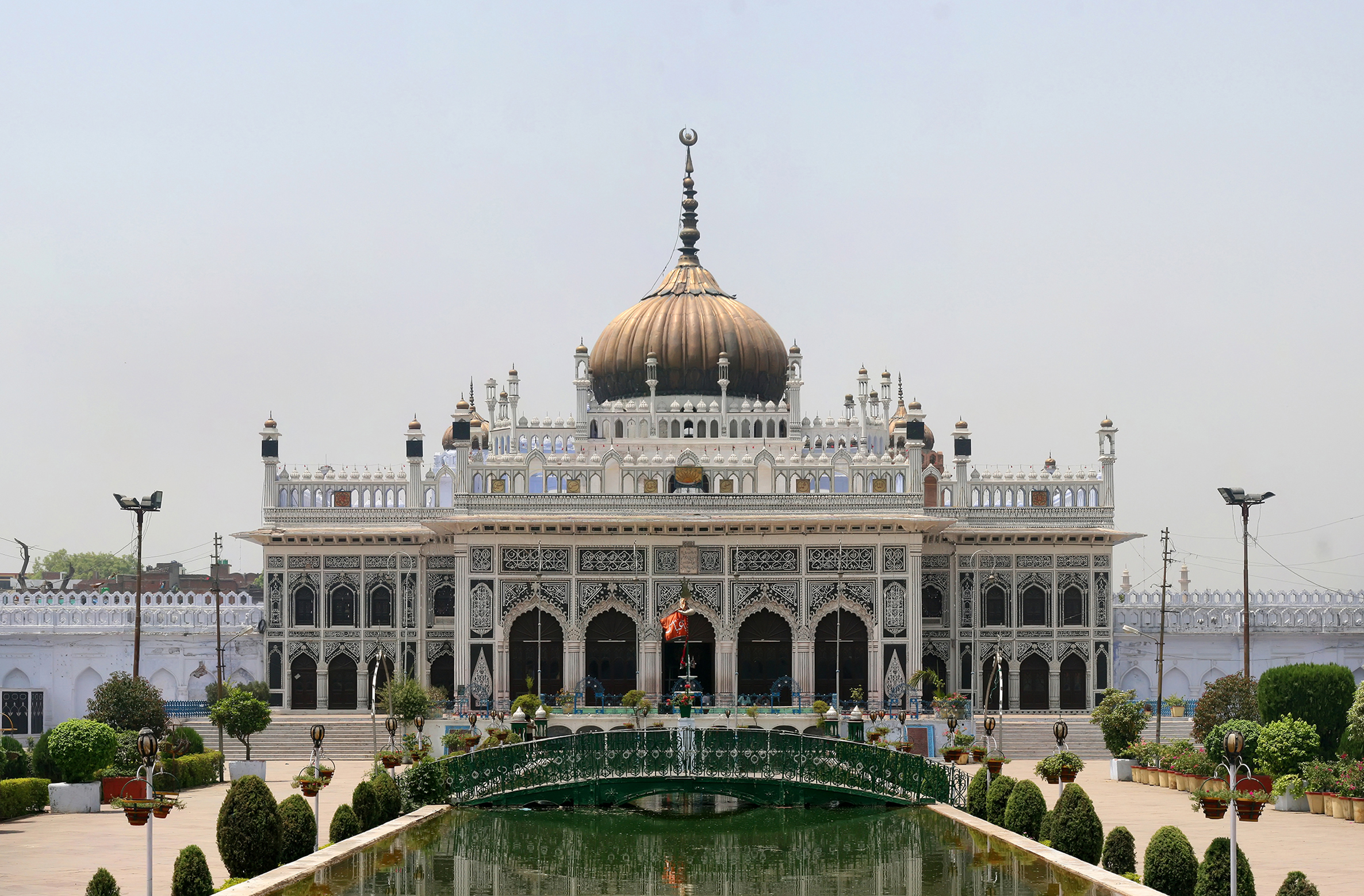
Chota Imambara, Lucknow

=== Buildings completed ===
- Palazzo Gavazzi, Milan, Italy, designed by Luigi Clerichetti.
- Rideau Hall, Ottawa, Canada, built by Scottish architect Thomas McKay.
- Walton Hall, Cheshire, England, designed for Sir Gilbert Greenall, 1st Baronet, possibly by Edmund Sharpe.
- Chota Imambara, Lucknow.

== Awards ==
- Grand Prix de Rome, architecture: Toussaint Uchard.

== Births ==
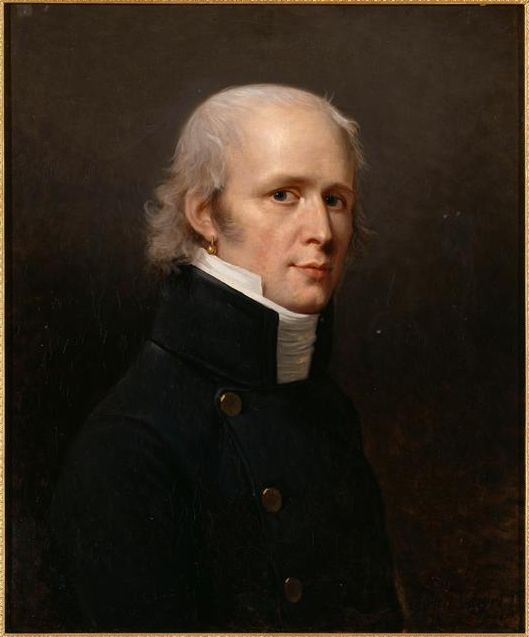
Charles Percier

- January 23 – John James Clark, Australian architect (died 1915)
- April 13 – J. D. Sedding, English ecclesiastical architect (died 1891)
- May 16 – Thomas Forrester, New Zealand plasterer, draughtsman, architect and engineer (died 1907)
- September 18 – Thomas Drew, Irish ecclesiastical architect (died 1910)
- September 29 – Henry Hobson Richardson, American city architect (died 1886)

== Deaths ==
- September 5 – Charles Percier, French Neoclassical architect, interior decorator and designer (born 1764)
- October 16 – William Vitruvius Morrison, Irish architect, son and collaborator of Sir Richard Morrison (born 1794)
