= Via Monte Napoleone =

Shopping street in Milan, Italy

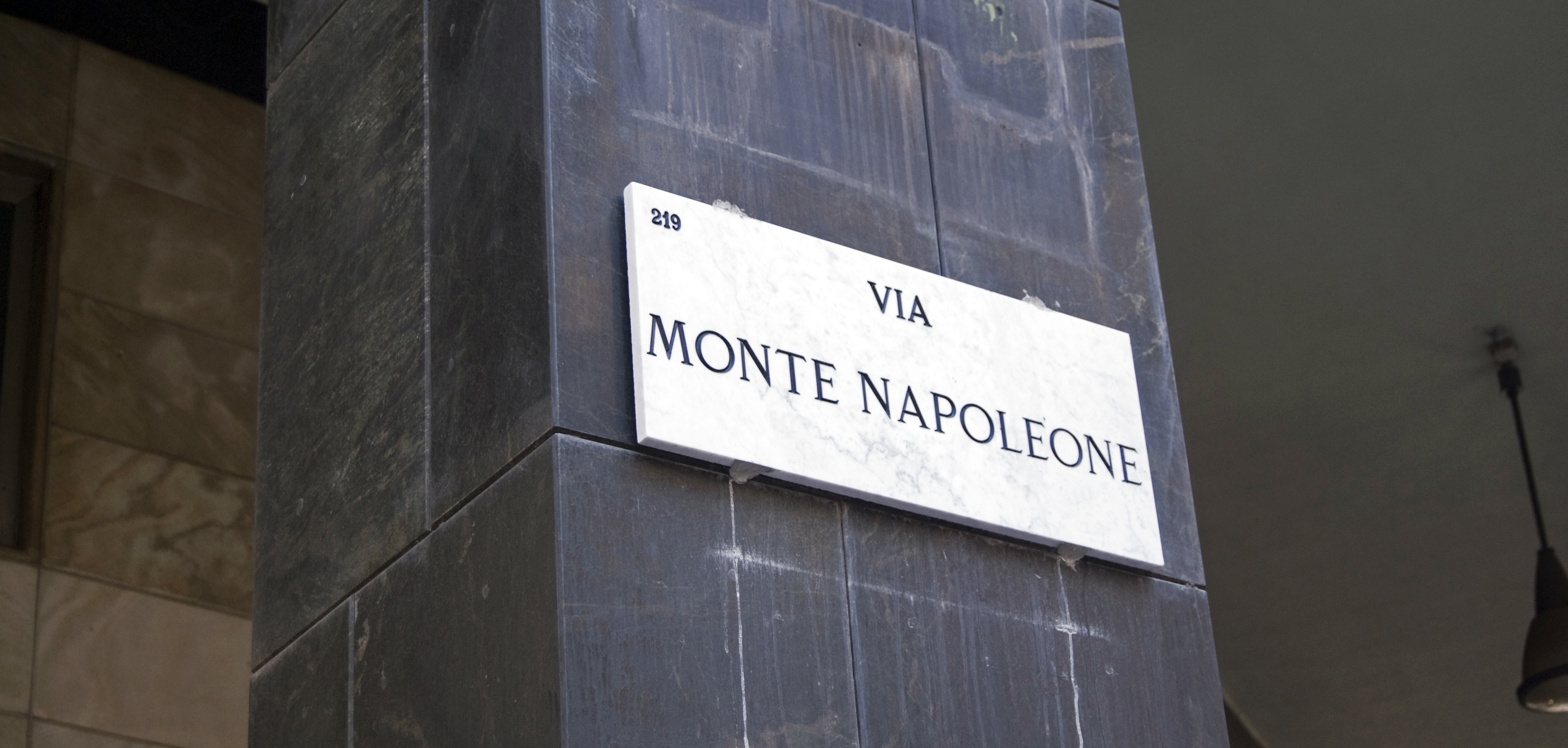

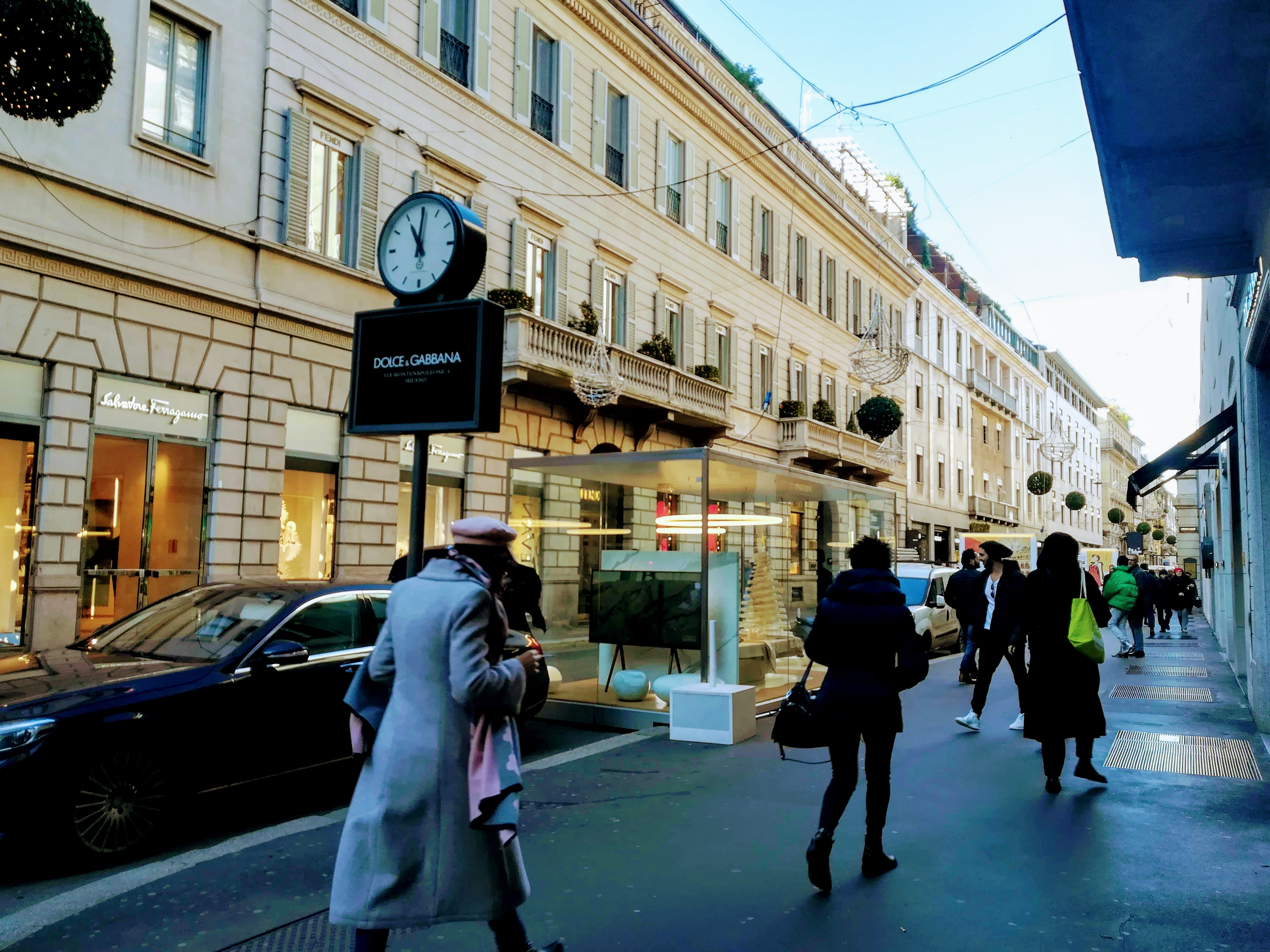
- Interactive map of Via Monte Napoleone
- Former name: Monte Napoleone
- Namesake: Monte Camerale di Santa Teresa, a bank located on the street
- Type: Public
- Maintained by: City of Milan
- Length: 350 m (1,150 ft)
- Area: Quadrilatero della Moda
- Location: Milan, Italy
- Postal code: 20121
- Nearest metro station: Montenapoleone, San Babila
- Coordinates: 45.46826°N 9.19520°E
- West end: Via Alessandro Manzoni
- East end: Corso Giacomo Matteotti

Other
- Known for: High fashion boutiques

Via Monte Napoleone (Lombard: Via Mont Napoleon) is an upscale shopping street in Milan, Italy. Located within the Quadrilatero della moda, Milan's fashion district, it is known for its luxury fashion houses, ready-to-wear boutiques and jewellery retailers. The street is a major centre of the global luxury goods industry and is regularly ranked among the most expensive retail streets in the world by prime rental rates, having ranked first in 2024.

== History ==
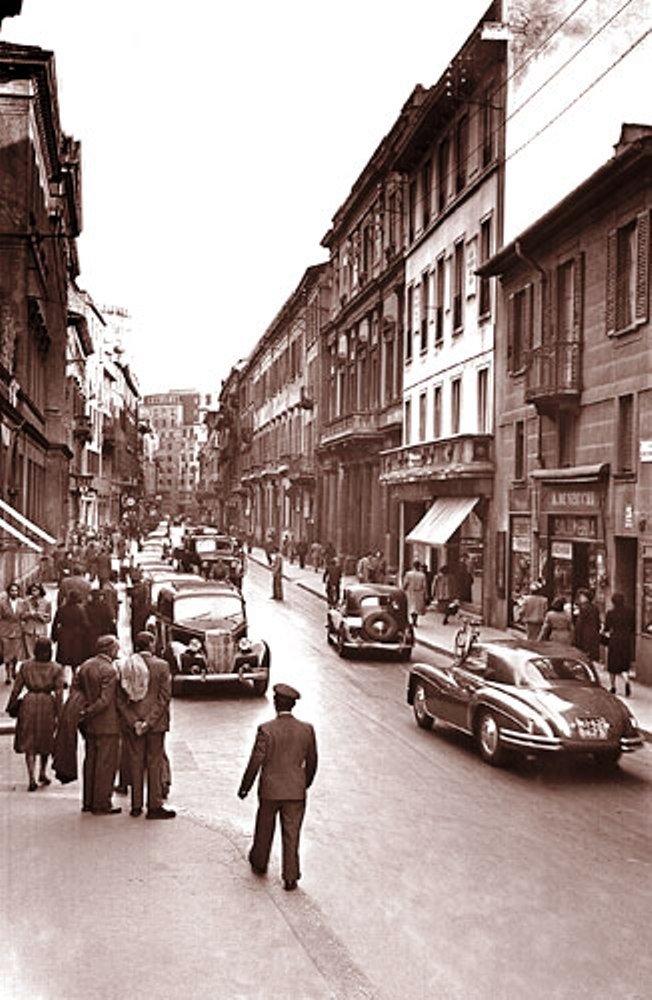
Via Monte Napoleone in the 1950s

The street traces the Roman city walls erected by Emperor Maximian. In 1783, a financial institution known as the Monte Camerale di Santa Teresa opened there in Palazzo Marliani, with the function of managing the public debt. In 1786 the street itself was named after the monte. The bank was closed in 1796 but re-opened in 1804, when Milan was capital of the Napoleonic Italian Republic, as the Monte Napoleone: from this the street derived its current name. During the first part of the 19th century the street was almost entirely rebuilt in the Neoclassical manner with palaces inhabited by the highest of the aristocracy. Notable buildings from this period are Palazzo Melzi di Cusano, Palazzo Gavazzi, Palazzo Carcassola Grandi, and Palazzo Taverna. The much earlier Palazzo Marliani however, regarded as one of the finest houses to survive from the era of the Sforza, was preserved until its destruction during the Allied bombing campaign of 1943.

After World War II, Via Monte Napoleone became one of the leading streets in international fashion, somewhat equivalent to Paris' Rue du Faubourg-Saint-Honoré, Rome's Via Condotti, London's Bond Street and Sloane Street, Los Angeles' Rodeo Drive, Florence's Via de' Tornabuoni, Berlin's Kurfürstendamm and New York's Fifth Avenue.

Caffè Cova, founded in 1817 and one of the city's oldest cafés and confectioners, relocated to Via Monte Napoleone in 1950 from its original premises next to the Teatro alla Scala.

In 2009, architect Fabio Novembre designed a months-long art installation, titled Per fare un albero, "To make a tree", in conjunction with the city of Milan's Department of Design, Events and Fashion and Fiat — featuring 20 full-size fiberglass planter replicas of the company's 500C cabriolet along Via Monte Napoleone.

In 2002, the Street Association started a media project including the Radio and the Portal, in order to relaunch the Made in Italy brand. Sponsored by the Department of Fashion, Tourism and Major Events of the Municipality of Milan, Italy Fashion System, and Assomoda, today it is the first instrument of revival and information on Made in Italy worldwide.

In early 2024, the street recorded the largest-ever transaction in Italy involving a single asset when Palazzo del Monte was acquired by Kering for 1.3 billion euros.

== Description ==
Via Monte Napoleone stretches for about 350 m (1,150 ft) long connecting Via Alessandro Manzoni to the west with Corso Giacomo Matteotti and Piazza San Babila to the east. The street is intersected by several smaller roads, including Via Pietro Verri and Via Sant'Andrea. Montenapoleone metro station is located at the western end of the street, near its intersection with Via Alessandro Manzoni, whereas San Babila metro station is located at the eastern end of the street in Piazza San Babila.

The street is bordered by several historic buildings, including Palazzo Taverna, Palazzo Carcassola Grandi, Palazzo del Monte, Palazzo Gavazzi, Palazzo Melzi di Cusano and Palazzo Vidiserti Dozzio.

== Gallery ==
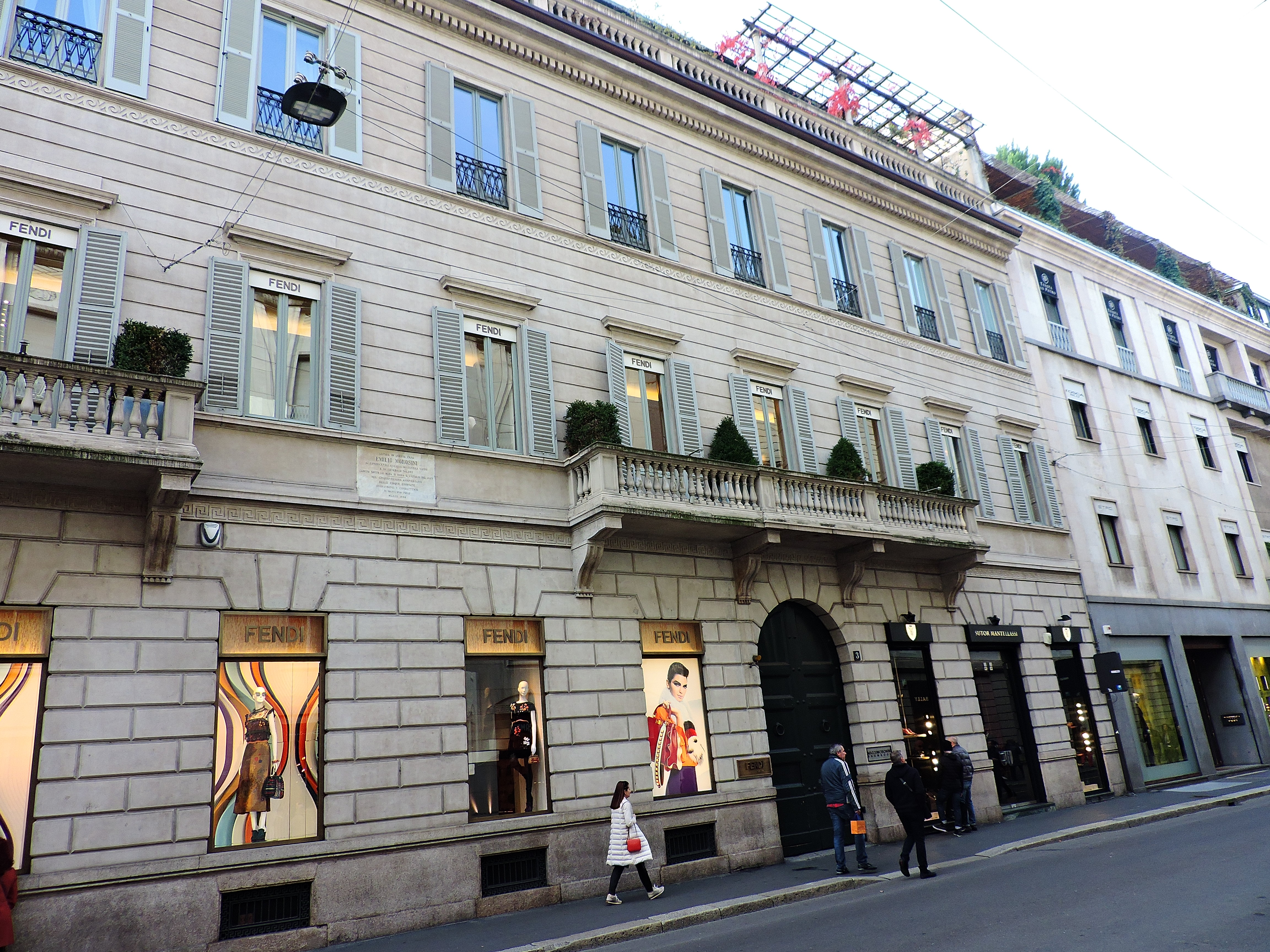
Fendi shop, Via Monte Napoleone

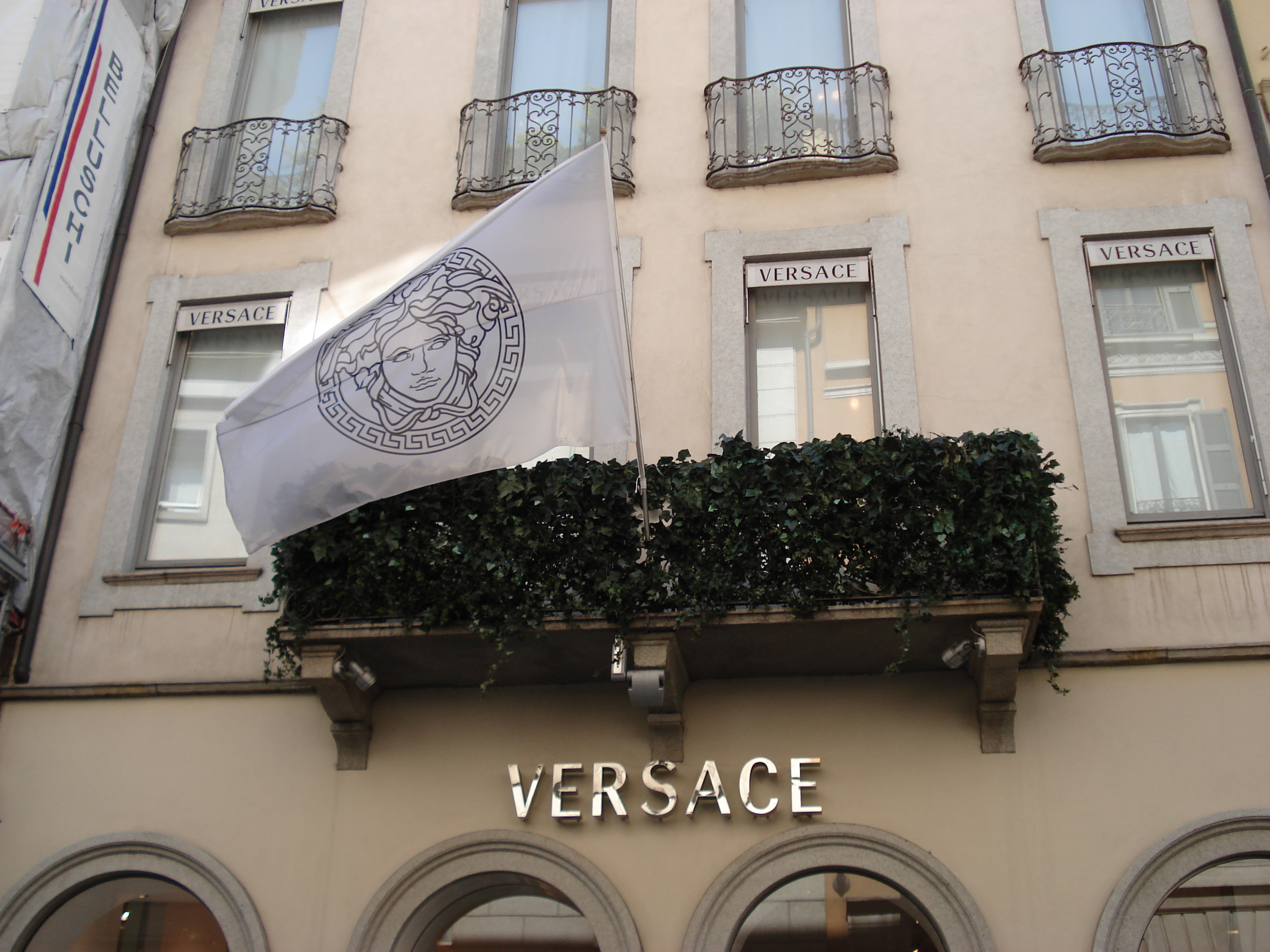
Versace shop, Via Monte Napoleone

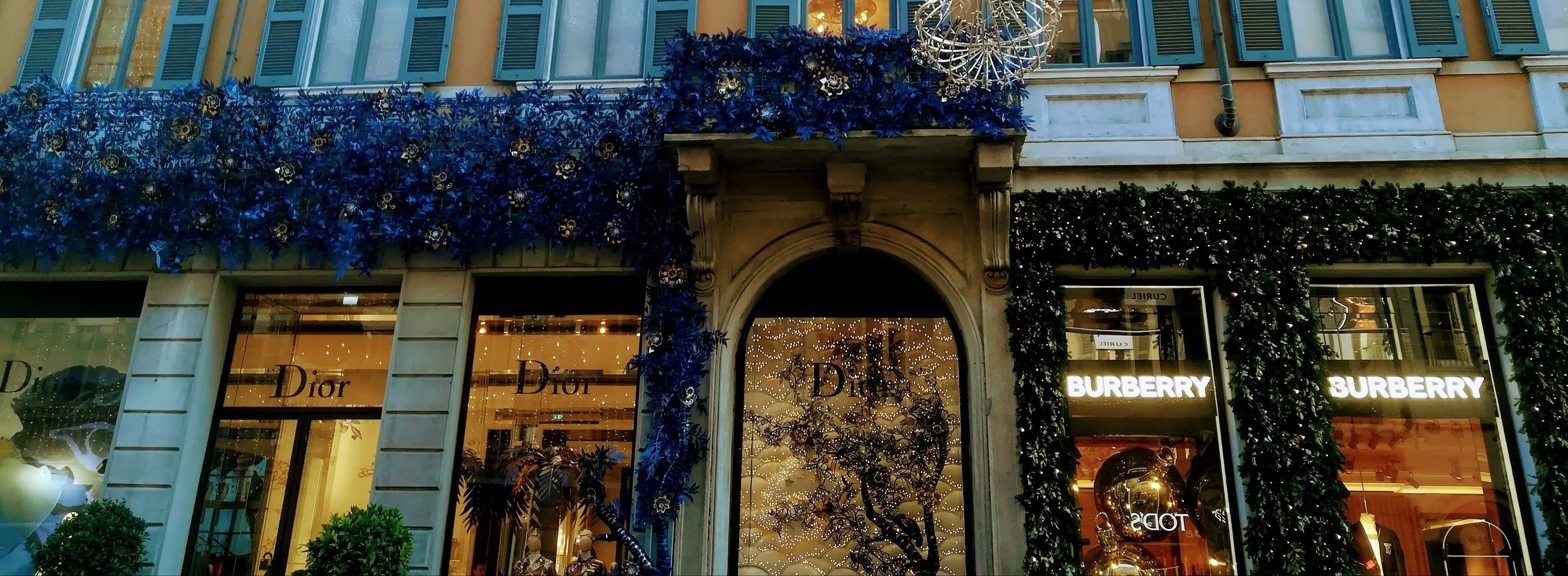
Dior and Burberry shops, Via Monte Napoleone

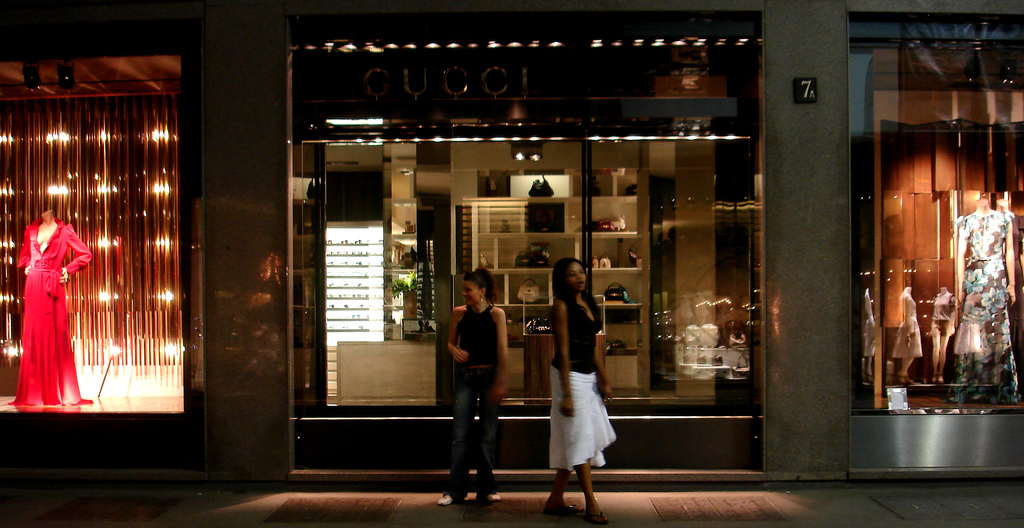
Gucci shop, Via Monte Napoleone

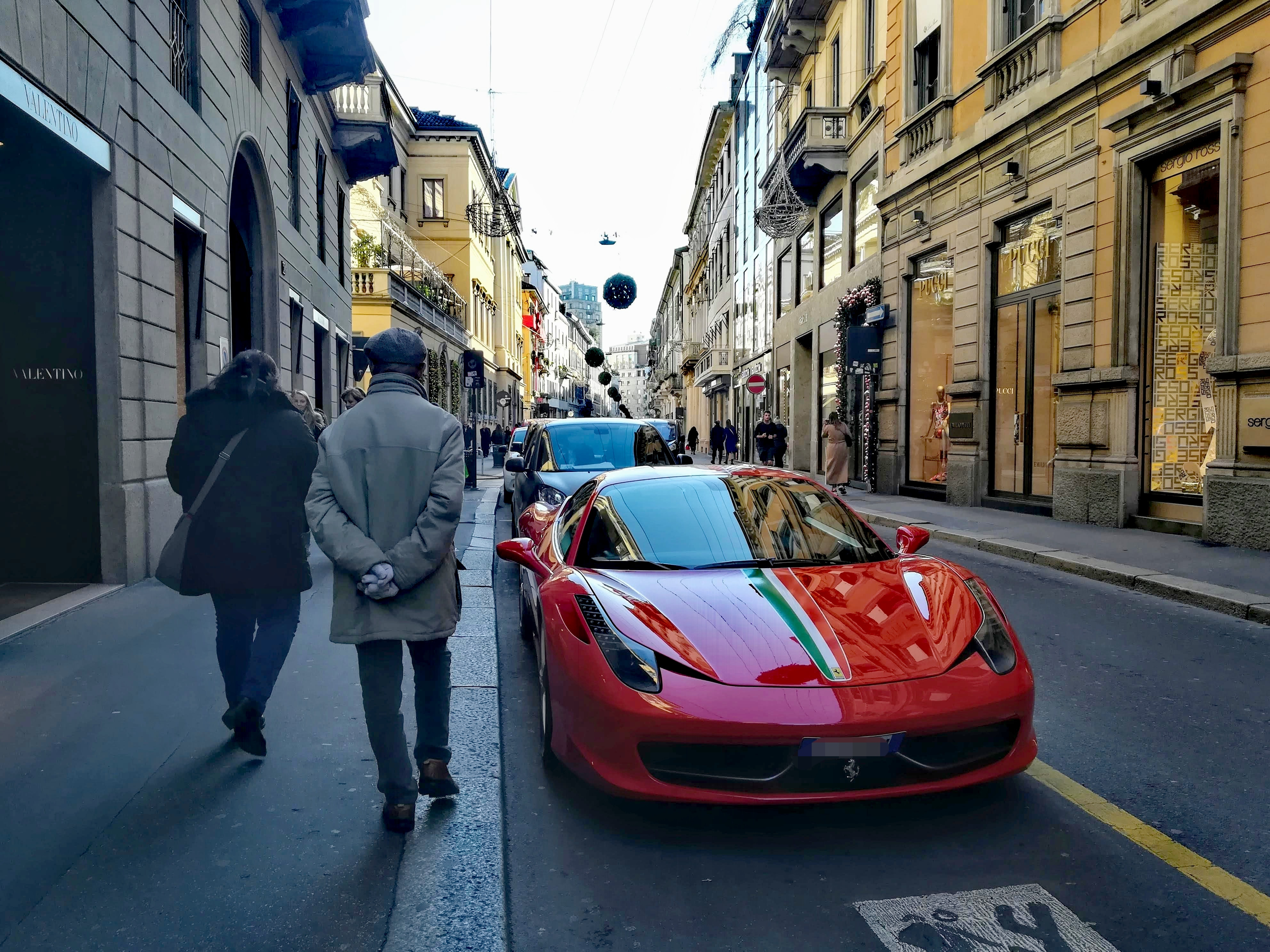
Valentino shop at left and Sergio Rossi and Pucci shops at right, Via Monte Napoleone

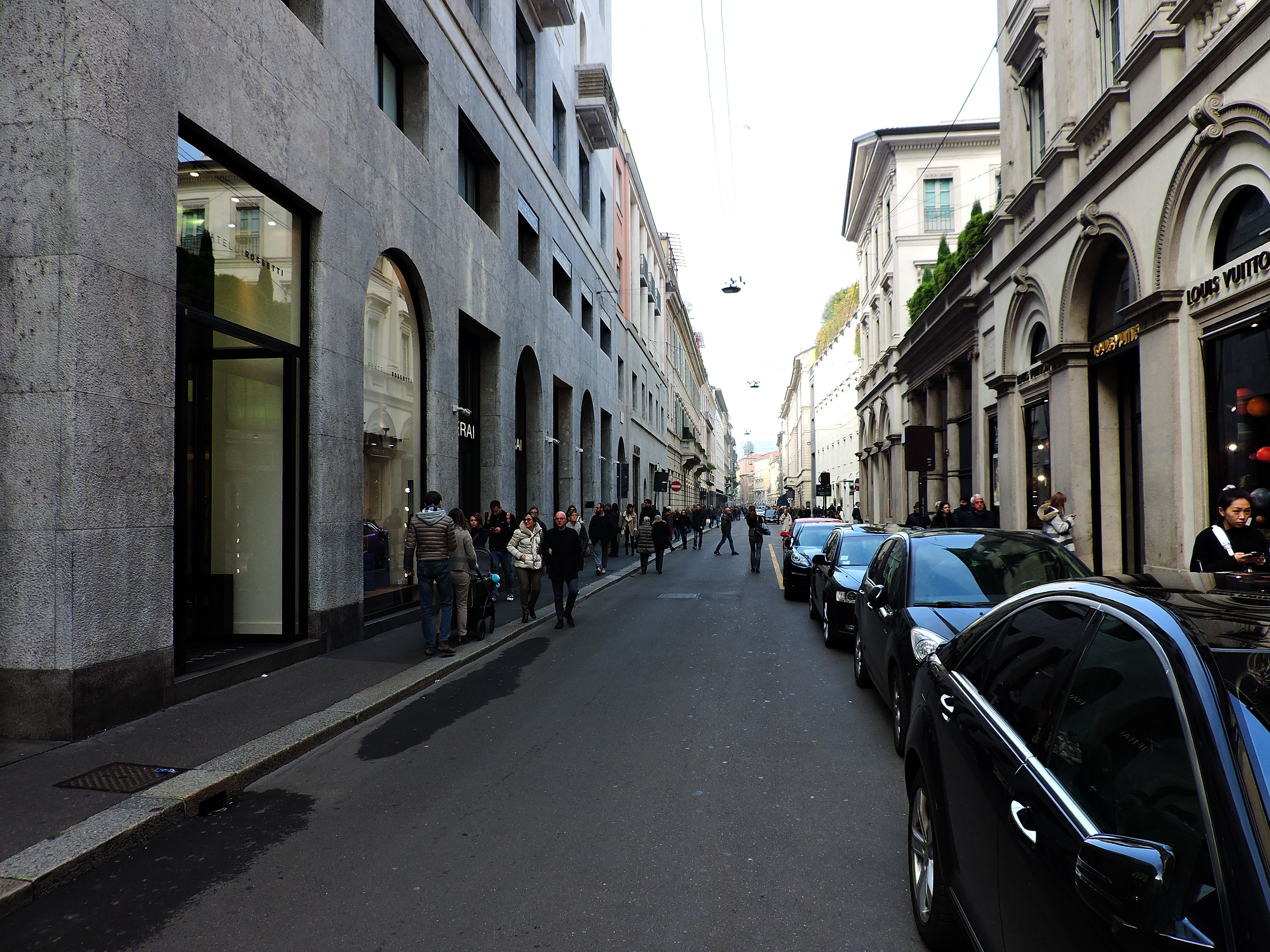
Louis Vuitton shop, Via Monte Napoleone

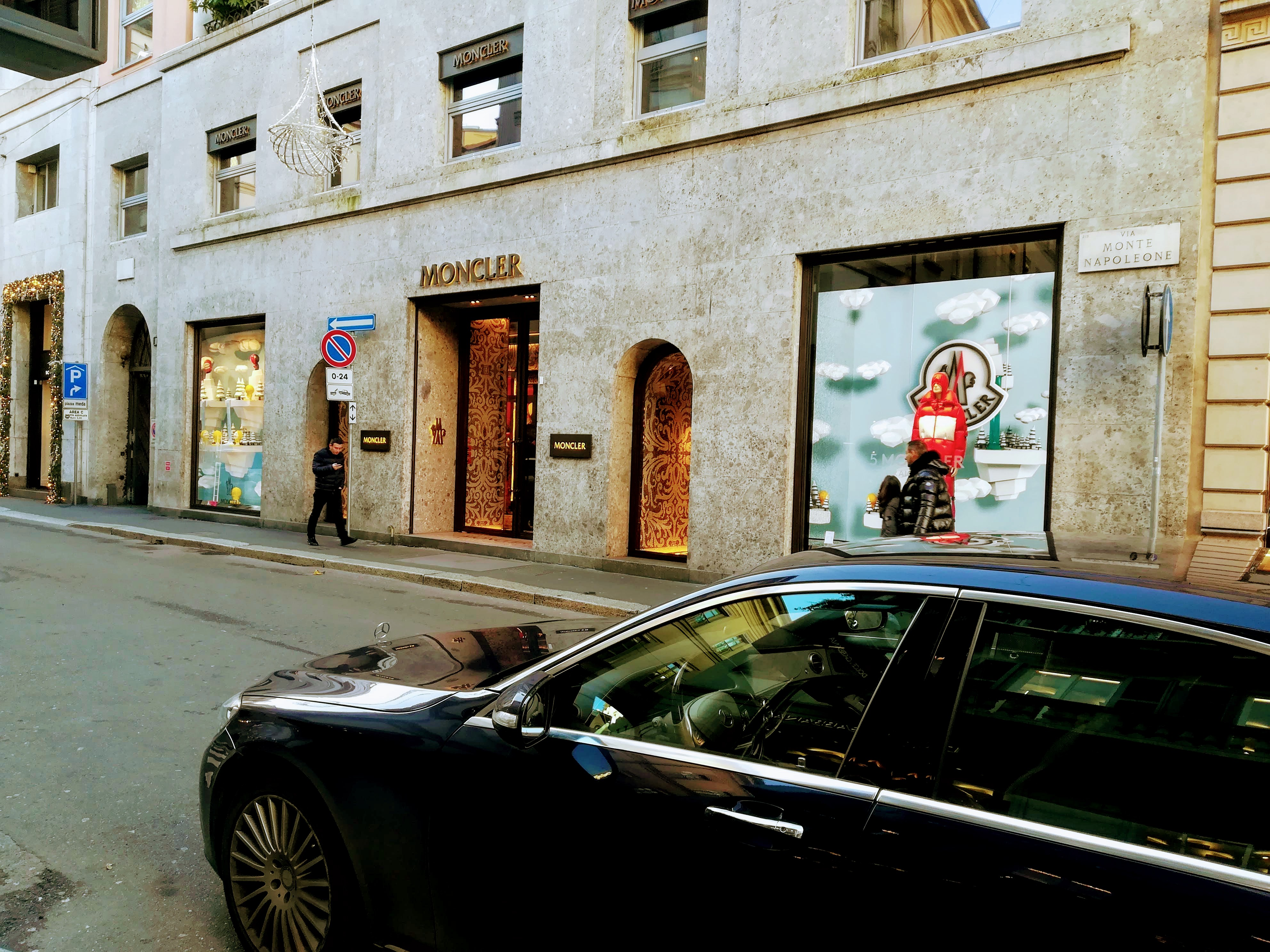
Moncler shop, Via Monte Napoleone

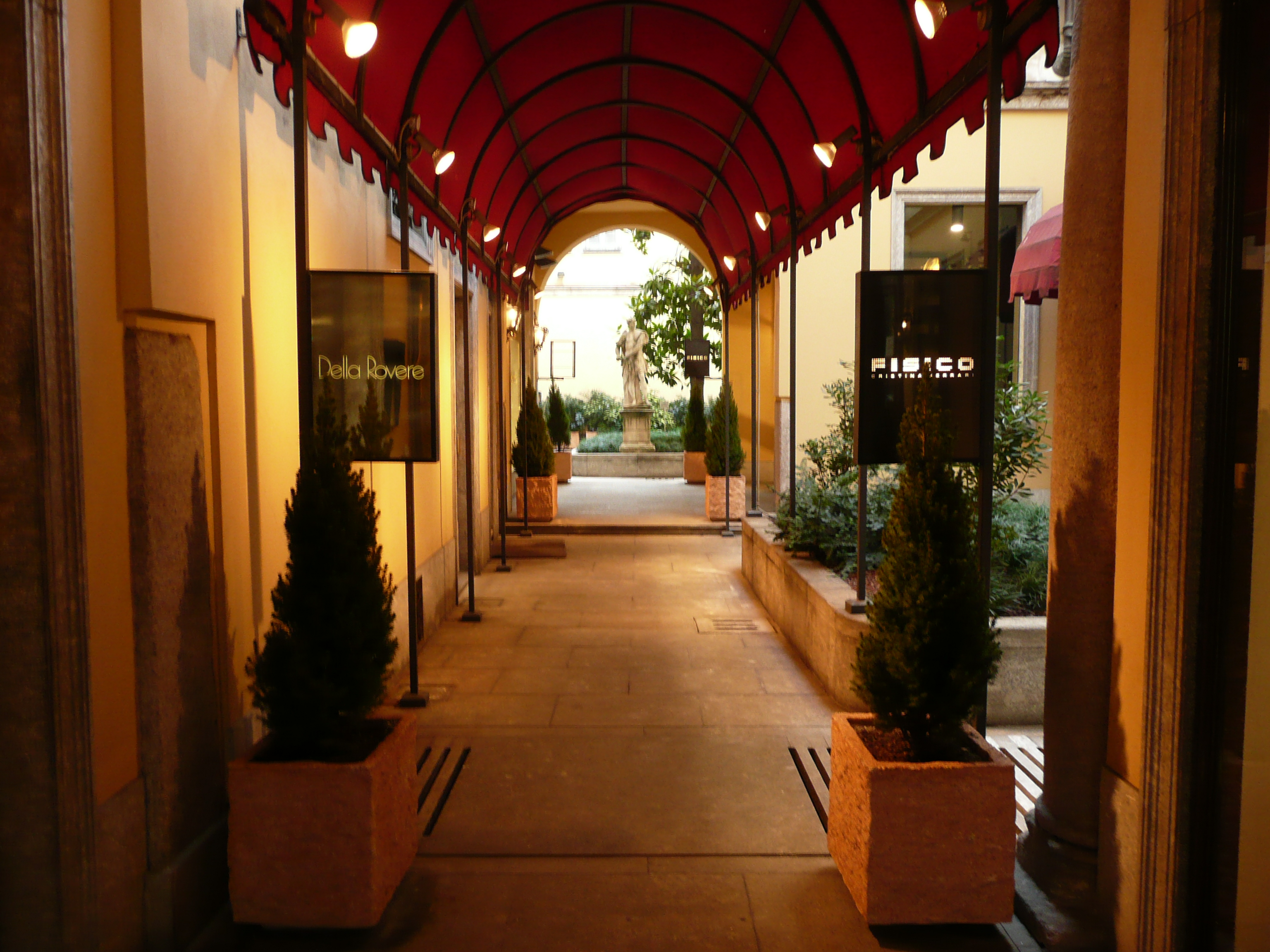
An arcaded boutique in Via Monte Napoleone

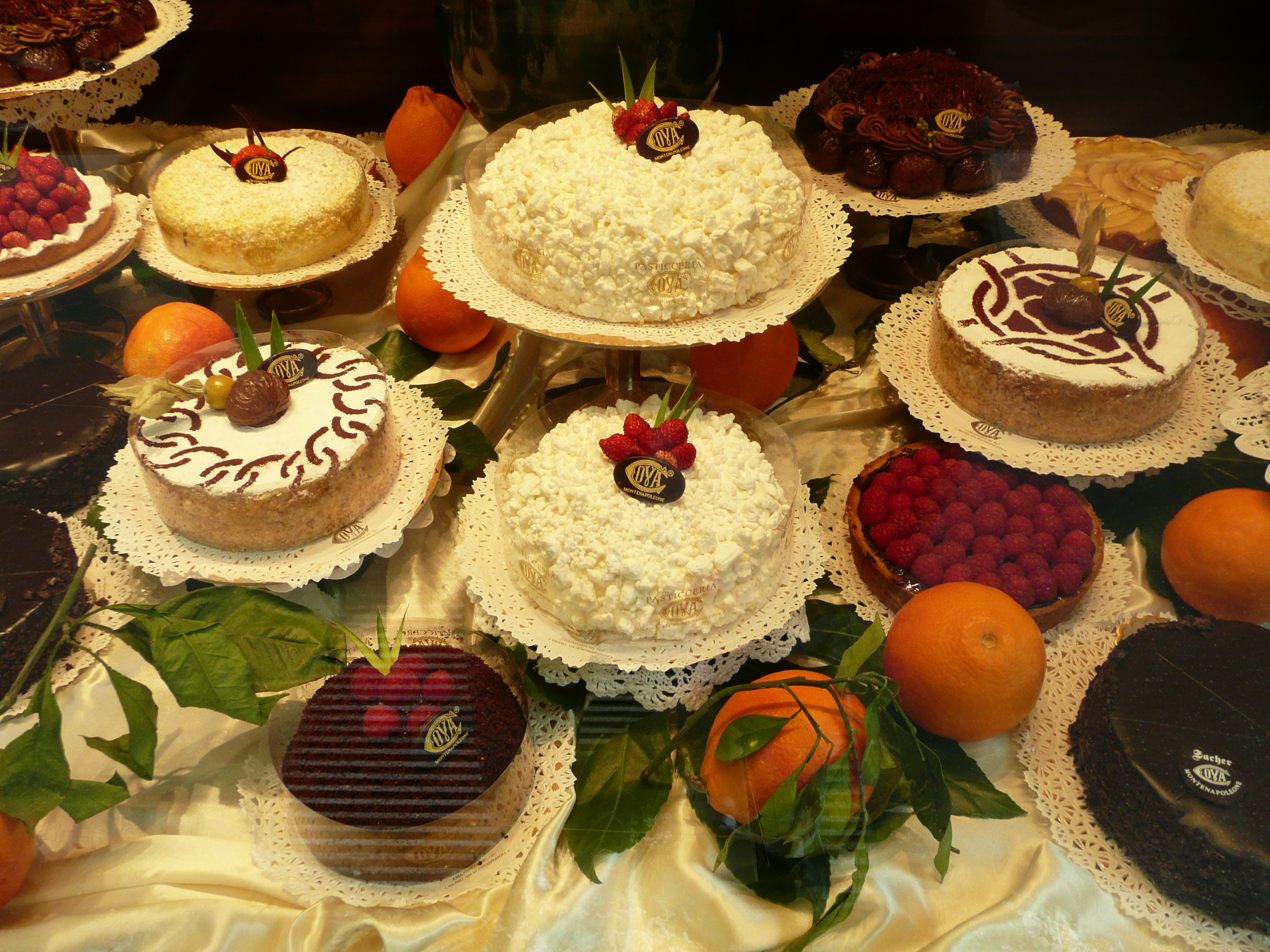
The Caffè Cova delicatessen serving traditional Milanese cakes and desserts in Via Monte Napoleone

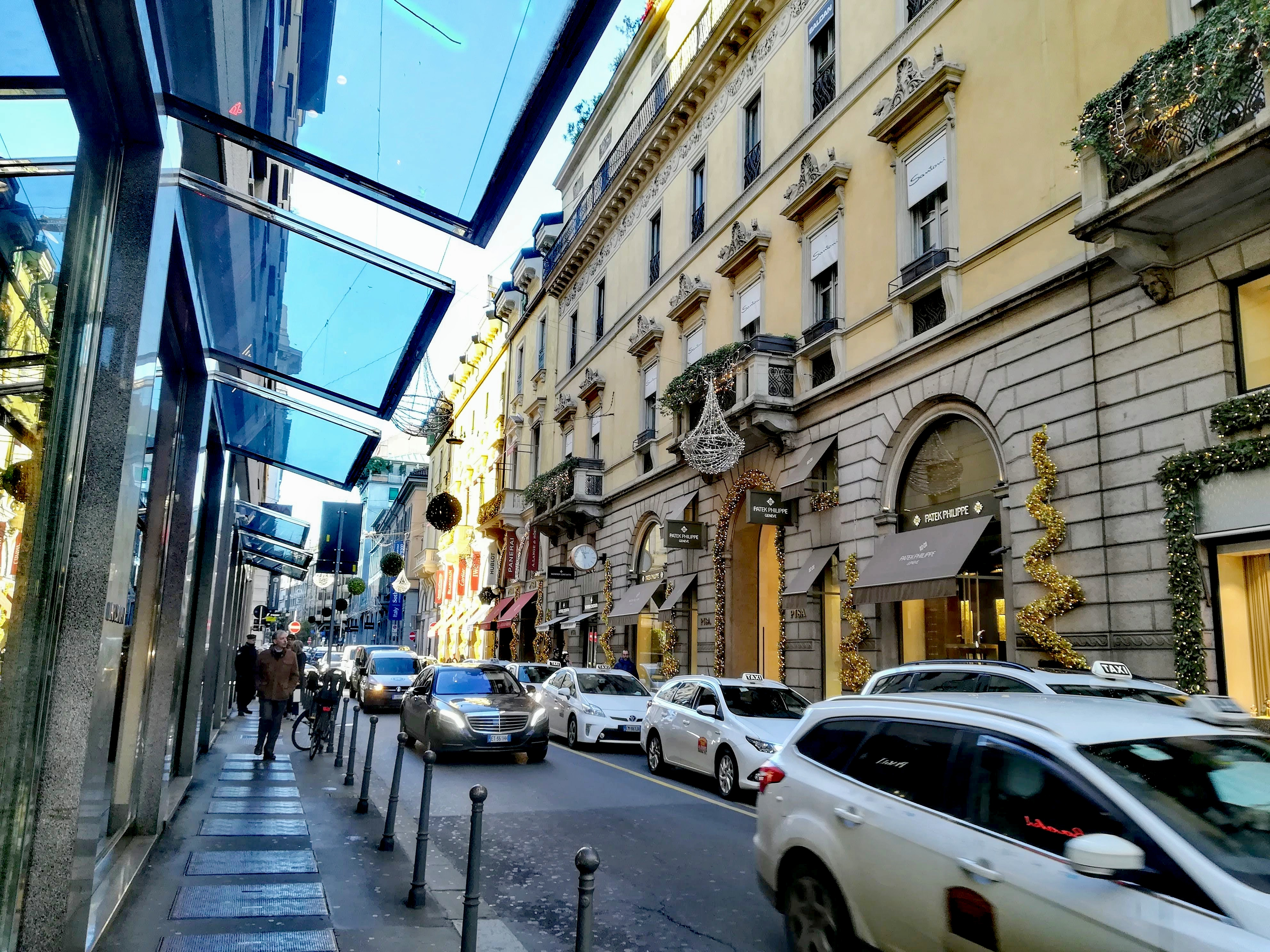
Patek Philippe shop at the junction between Via Pietro Verri and Via Monte Napoleone

== See also ==
- List of upscale shopping districts
