= Caffè-Pasticceria Cova =

Italian pastry shop, delicatessen and coffeehouse

Coordinates: 45°28′05.42″N 9°11′43.65″E

- Company type: Coffeehouse
- Founded: 1817
- Headquarters: Via Montenapoleone, 8, Milan, Italy
- Key people: Paola Faccioli (CEO)
- Parent: LVMH
- Website: www.pasticceriacova.com

The Caffè Cova is one of Milan, Italy's oldest pastry shops, delicatessens and coffeehouses, today property of the French group Moët Hennessy Louis Vuitton. Founded in 1817 by a soldier, Antonio Cova near the Teatro alla Scala, since 1950 situated in the fashionable Via Montenapoleone, part of Milan's quadrilatero della moda or fashion quadrilateral.

== History ==
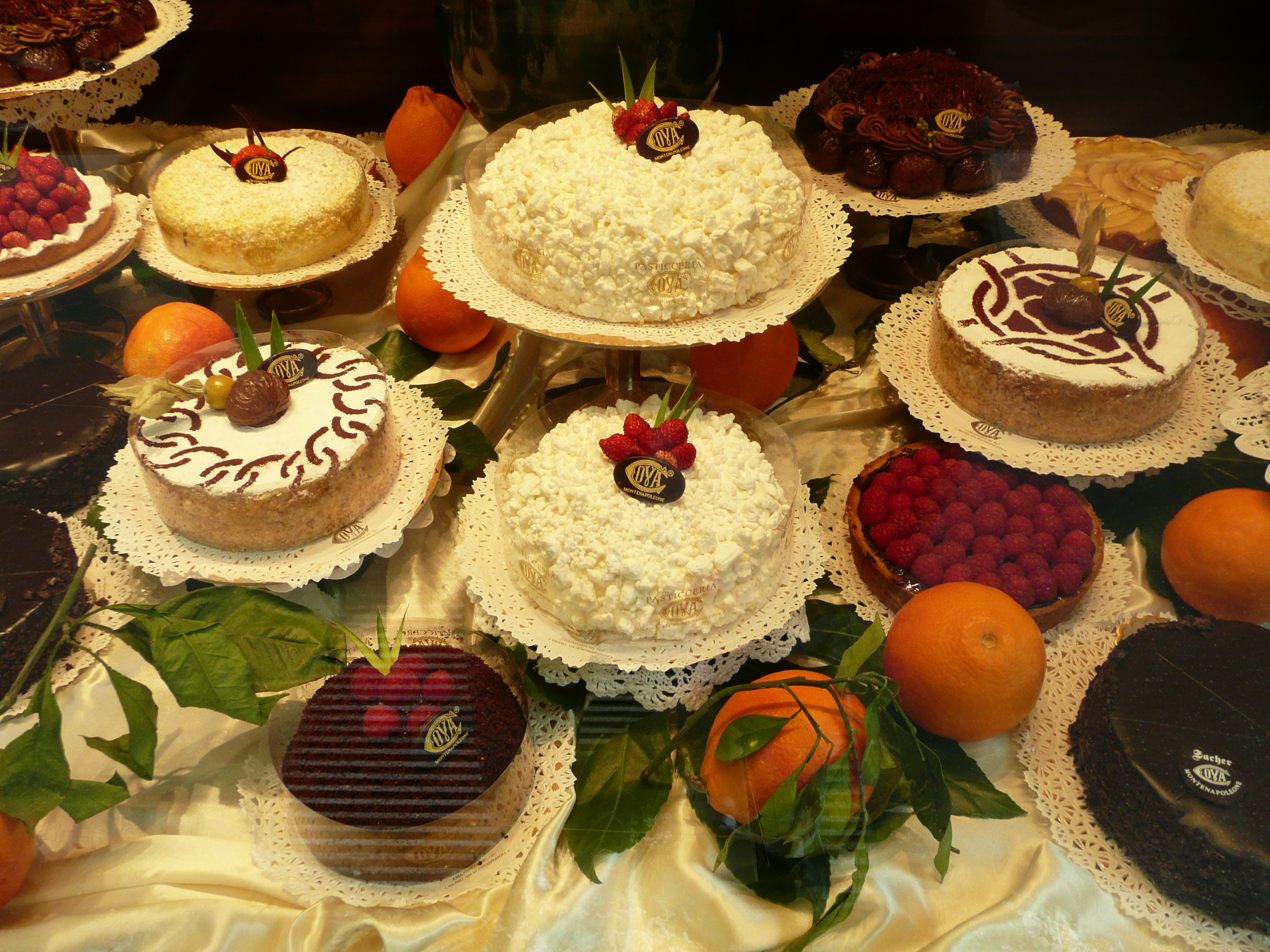
Different cakes and tarts in display in the Milan Caffè Cova, founded in 1817.

=== Beginnings ===
Founded by veteran Antonio Cova in 1817, the Caffè was an important place for socialization and the meeting of the Milano bene, or the Milanese upper-class citizens, and it was a haunt for intellectuals, artists, musicians, academics, writers, politicians and journalists.

=== Unification of Italy ===
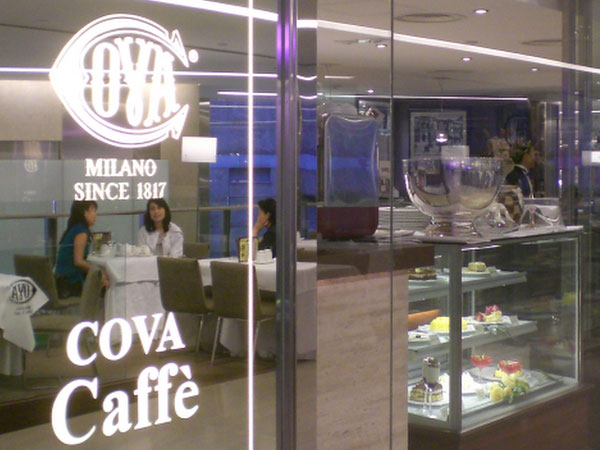
The Hong Kong Caffè Cova, which was opened between 1993 and 1994.

The cafe became an important place during the cinque giornate di Milano during March 1848, when several of the foreigners were expelled from the coffeehouse itself.

=== Post-World War II (1950-1990) ===
During World War II, the Cova establishment and the nearby La Scala were devastatingly affected by the 1943 bombings of Milan. Ever since then, in 1950, the pasticceria transferred itself to the Via Montenapoleone, in the North-Eastern central part of the city.

=== Modern age and today (1990-) ===
Ever since the 1990s, the Caffè began to open franchises in Asia, the most notable of which was the Hong Kong Caffè Cova, which opened in the city in 1993. In 1997, the Caffè Cova opened a delicatessen aboard the American Celebrity Cruises, further spreading the institution's influence around the world. Today, the Milan Caffè Cova still maintains its aristocratic atmosphere, and remains common place for the wealthier Milanese to drink an espresso or cappuccino, but it has also become popular with tourists and shoppers on the Via Montenapoleone alike. The delicatessen is also well known for its different pastries and rich selection of cakes, including wedding cakes. In Colombia they sell the products with the association of Miryam Camhi, a traditional Colombian Bakery, only at the Centro Andino store. As of August 2015, the historical Montenapoleone location is undergoing renovations after the acquisition by LVMH in 2013.

As at 2026, Cova is operating in Milan, Shanghai, Hong Kong, Montecarlo, Kuwait, Saudi Arabia, Qatar, Greece and Paris (such as Pont Neuf).

== See also ==
- List of coffeehouse chains
