= Fabio Novembre =

Italian architect and designer (born 1966)

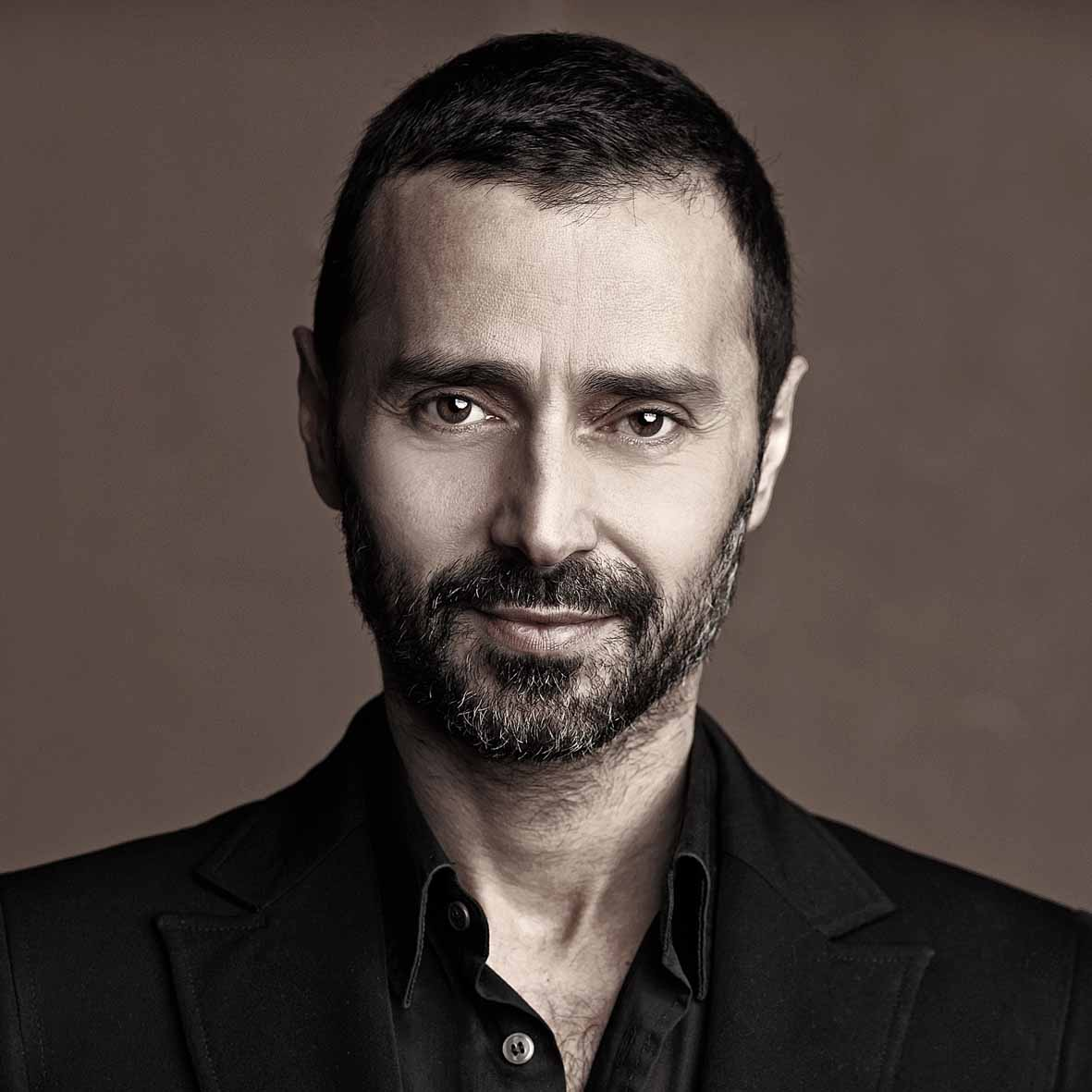
- Born: 21 October 1966 (age 59); Lecce, Italy
- Occupation: Architect

Fabio Novembre (21 October 1966) is an Italian architect and designer.

== Biography ==
He moved to Milan in 1984, where in 1992 he received a degree in architecture. In 1993 he lived in New York City where he attended a filmmaking course at the New York University. In 1994, he was commissioned to design his first project: the “Anna Molinari Blumarine” shop in London. In the same year he opened his own studio in Milan.

From 2000 until 2003 he worked as Art Director at Bisazza, contributing in the international growth of the mosaic tile brand. Since 2001 he has worked for Italian design brands such as Cappellini, Driade, Meritalia, Flaminia and Casamania.

In 2008, on behalf of the Municipality of Milan, the Rotonda di Via Besana museum housed an exhibition about his work, "Teach me the freedom of swallows”. In 2009, the Triennale Design Museum of Milan, invited Novembre to curate and design an exhibition on his work: “Il fiore di Novembre”. In 2010, the City of Milan was represented by an installation that he designed and curated in the Pavilion of Italy at Expo in Shanghai.

In 2009, Novembre designed an art installation, titled Per fare un albero, ‘To make a tree’, in conjunction with the city of Milan's Department of Design, Events and Fashion and Fiat — featuring 20 full-size fiberglass planter replicas of the company's 500C cabriolet along Via Monte Napoleone, Milan's fashion center. The installation lasted several months.

2011 is the photography year: after art-directing of the exhibition “Lavazza con te partirò” at the Teatro dell'Arte of the Triennale of Milan on the occasion of the 20th anniversary of the company's calendar; he also designed and curated the Steve McCurry exhibition at MACRO Testaccio, Rome. In April 2012 he signs the new exhibition setting for the fifth edition of Triennale Design Museum. In 2014, Casa Milan, the new headquarters of the A.C. Milan, were open, where all interiors are designed by Fabio Novembre.

== Works ==
=== Architecture ===
- Anna Molinari Blumarine store, Hong Kong and London (1994), Singapore, Hong Kong and Taipei (1995)
- Cafè l’Atlantique bar-restaurant, Milan, 1995
- B Square store, Hong Kong, 1996
- Blu discothèque, Lodi, 1997
- ON Natural Wellness Center, Milan, 1997
- bar Lodi, Lodi, 1998
- SHU bar-restaurant, Milan, 1999
- Via Spiga showroom, Milan, 1999
- Li Cuncheddi hotel, Olbia, 2000
- Tardini store, New York City, 2000
- Divina discothèque, Milan, 2001
- UNA Hotel Vittoria hotel, Florence, 2003
- Bisazza stands, Stuttgart and Bologna (2000), New Orleans, Bologna and London (2001)
- Bisazza showroom, Barcelona (2001), Milan (2002), New York and Berlin (2003)
- Novembre house/office, Milan, 2004
- Meltin’ Pot stands, Berlin and Barcelona (2005), Florence (2008)
- Meltin’ Pot showroom, New York (2005), Milan, (by SICIS The Art Mosaic Factory )(2006)
- Stuart Weitzman store, Rome (2006), Beijing and Beverly Hills (2007), Hong Kong, New York and Paris (2008)
- Margherita e Co. shop in shop, Bergamo, 2008
- ALV showroom, Milan, 2009
- Moscara restaurant, Milan, 2010
- "HIT Gallery", Hong Kong, 2012
- "Who's Who", Milan, 2013
- "Who's Who", Rome, 2014
- "Carpisa", Naples, 2014
- "Carpisa", Milan, 2014
- "Casa Milan", A.C. Milan, Milan, 2014

=== Design ===
- Honlywood chair, for B&B Italia, 1988
- Mediterranea chaise longue, for Bonacina, 1991
- Bottle prototype, for Uliveto, 1995
- ORG table, for Cappellini, 2001
- NET carpet, for Cappellini, 2001
- AND sitting system, for Cappellini, 2002
- S.O.S. Sofa Of Solitude armchair and chaise longue, for Cappellini, 2003
- Point of purchase products, for Meltin’ Pot, 2005
- RPH sofa, for Cappellini, 2006
- Air Lounge System collection, for Meritalia, 2006
- +13 plus one tree pot, for Casamania, 2007
- maniglie Love Opens Doors handle collection, for Fusital, 2007
- Moving Fashion Award, for Il Sole 24 ore, 2007
- 100 Piazze trays, for Driade, 2007
- SW416 small table, for Meritalia, 2007
- HIM&HER chairs, for Casamania, 2008
- STFS Slow The Flow System water tap, for Stella, 2008
- Void System sanitary ware Line, for Flaminia, 2008
- DIVINA sofa, for Driade, 2008
- SEC armchair, for Cappellini, 2008
- Histograms armchair and table, for Gispen, 2008
- Magic Carpet, for Cappellini, 2008
- Green Line vase, for Bitossi, 2009
- Joy baby chair, for Casamania, 2009
- Nemo chair, for Driade, 2010
- Luciola lamp, for Driade, 2010
- Abath chair, for Casamania, 2010
- OK stool, for Kartell, 2011
- Robox bookshelf, for Casamania, 2011
- Strip chair, for Casamania, 2011
- HP, for Wallpaper and Reebok, 2011
- Happy Pills vase, for Venini, 2012
- 36h 56h chair, for Driade, 2012
- Murana vase, for Venini, 2012
- World's best glassware, for RCR, 2013
- F3 outdoor furniture, for Vondom, 2013
- Boom lamp, for Venini, 2013
- Love Hurts Eventually ring, 2013
- Jolly Roger chair, for Gufram, 2013
- I Have a Lifestyle window display, for Tommy Hilfiger, 2013
- In punta di piedi table, 2015

== Exhibitions, Shows, Installations ==
- Installation Nuovamente, exhibition on recycle, Milan, 1996
- Installation Love over all, Paris, 2002
- Installation Casa, Verona, 2003
- Installation Skybaby, Milan, 2005
- Installation Philips Transition: Light on the move, Milan, 2007
- Exhibition Teach me the freedom of swallows, Milan.
- Exhibition Il fiore di Novembre (The Novembre's flower), Milan, 2009
- Installation Per fare un albero with Fiat 500, Milan, Paris, Madrid, Capri, 2009/2010
- Installation Milano creative City, Italian Pavilion, Expo Shanghai, 2010
- Exhibition Unexpected Guests - Homes of Yesteryear, Design of Today at the Museo Poldi Pezzoli at Milan, 2010
- Installation The Rainbow Thieves, Moscow, 2010
- Installation Per fare un albero for Fiat, Milan, 2010
- Installation Ieri, Oggi, Domani, Milan, 2010
- Exhibition Franko B I still love, Milan, 2010
- Installation Bang for Lasvit, Milan, 2011
- Exhibition Lavazza Con te partirò, Milan, 2011
- Exhibition Steve McCurry, Rome, 2011
- Exhibition TDM5, at Triennale Design Museum, Milan, 2012
- Installation Stay Human for BMW, Rome, 2012
- Exhibition Seconda Pelle for A.C. Milan, at Triennale Design Museum, Milan, 2012
- Event Lapsus for Gufram, Milan, 2013
- Installation Here I Am for IMIB, Milan, 2014
- Installation We Dance for Lexus, Milan, 2014
- Installation Salone del Gusto for Lavazza, Turin, 2014
- Installation The Earth Defenders for Lavazza, at Eataly, Milan, 2014
- Installation Who Are You? for Replay, Milan, 2015
- Bar Lavazza Expo 2015 for Lavazza, at Expo Milano 2015 Milan, 2015
- Exhibition From These Hands: A Journey Along the Coffee Trail, for Lavazza and Steve McCurry at Museo della Scienza e della Tecnologia "Leonardo da Vinci", Milan, 2015
- Exhibition The Trophy Factory for A.C. Milan, at Casa Milan, Milan, 2015

== Lectures and Workshops ==
- Faculty of Architecture, Delft Netherlands, 2001
- Faculty of Architecture, Milan Italy, 2001
- Katoenveem, Rotterdam Netherlands, 2001
- Faculty of Architecture, Palermo, 2002
- Contract World Event, Hannover Germany, 2003
- Faculty of Architecture, Düsseldorf Germany, 2003
- Seoul Living Design Fair, Seoul Korea, 2003
- Architecture and Water workshop, Havana Cuba, 2003
- Royal Institute of British Architects, London United Kingdom, 2004
- Il mosaico tra arte e architettura, Palazzo Ducale, Genoa, 2005
- Clubovka Event, Bratislava Slovakia, 2005
- Interview with Vico Magistretti, Palazzo Reale, Milan, 2005
- The Visual Power Show, Eindhoven Netherlands, 2005
- L’architettura spiegata ai bambini, Palazzo della Triennale, Milan, 2005
- I Saloni WorldWide, Moscow Russia, 2005
- Future Design Days, Stockholm Sweden, nel 2005
- IV International Architecture and Construction Forum, São Paulo Brazil, 2006
- University of Lecce, Lecce Italy, 2006
- Italian Design Talks I Saloni 2007, London and New York City, 2007
- Trendboard Workshop, Cologne Germany, 2007
- The Great Indoors Award, Maastricht Netherlands, 2007
- Exotica Event, Tel Aviv Israel, 2007
- Tasmeen Doha Design Conference, Doha Qatar, 2008
- Festival dell’ Architettura, Cagliari Italy, 2008
- Vitra Workshop, Boisbuchet France, 2008
- Interieur ’08, Kortrijk Belgium, 2008

== Publications ==
- A Sud di Memphis, Idea Books, Milan, 1995 ISBN 978-88-7017-120-4
- Be your own Messiah, Milan, 2001
- Tra la contemporaneità degli input e la primordialità degli output, Abitare n.471, April 2007
- A chi e a che cosa serve un Museo del Design?, Abitare n.480, March 2008
- Why I created a table with 171 legs, L’uomo Vogue n.390, April 2008
- Il pesce fuor d’acqua, Velvet n.18, May 2008
- Il design spiegato a mia madre, Rizzoli, Milan, 2011 ISBN 9788858659113

== Sources ==
- Giuliana Gramigna Paola Biondi, Il design in Italia, Umberto Allemandi &C., Turin, Italy 1999, p. 344
- Leo Gullbring, Fabio Novembre, Frame-Birkhauser, Amsterdam, Netherlands 2001
- editor Emilia Terragni, Spoon, Phaidon Press Limited, London, United Kingdom 2002, pp. 272–275
- editor Katey Day, Designers on design by Terence Conran and Max Fraser, Conran Octopus Limited, London, U.K. 2004, p. 184-185
- editor Jennifer Hudson, Interior Architecture now, Laurence King Publishing Ltd, London, U.K. 2007, pp. 210–215
- editor Andrea Branzi, Capire il design, Giunti Editore S.p.A., Florence, Italy 2007, pp. 255–256
- Beppe Finessi, Fabio Novembre, Skira Editore, Milan, Italy 2008
