= Grand Hotel et de Milan =

Hotel in Milan, Italy

Coordinates: 45°28′12.77″N 9°11′34.26″E

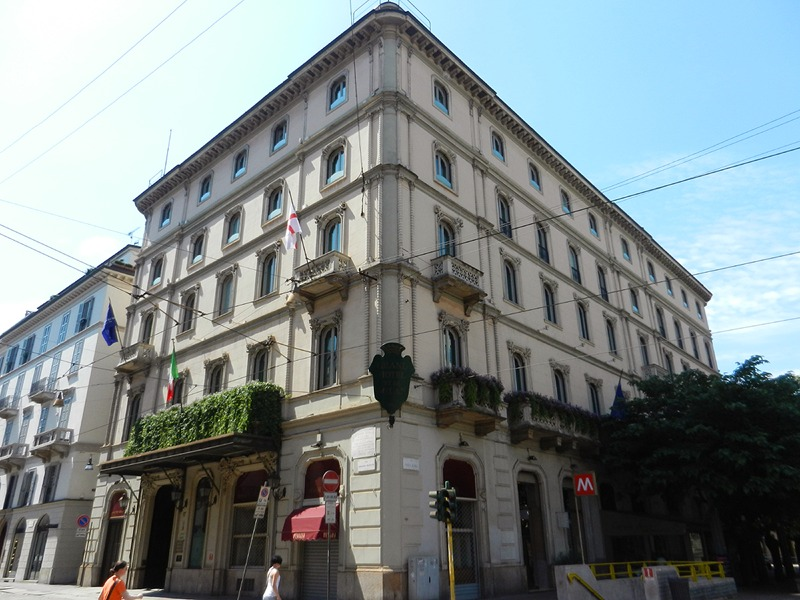
- Milano - Grand Hotel et de Milan
- Interactive map of the Grand Hotel et de Milan area

General information
- Location: Milan, Italy, Via Manzoni, 29
- Opening: 1863

Design and construction
- Architect: Andrea Pizzala (1862) Giovanni Muzio (1946)

Website
- grandhoteletdemilan.it

The Grand Hotel et de Milan is a luxury hotel located in the centre of Milan, Italy.

== History ==
The construction was commissioned to architect Andrea Pizzala (1798–1862) and was inspired by the neo-Gothic movement. Inaugurated in 1863, it offered services fitting of a grand hotel of the capital of the Kingdom of Lombardy–Venetia: postal and telegramming services, as well as a hydraulic elevator. It was just a short carriage ride from La Scala Theatre, renowned amongst composers, musicians, singers and music lovers who simply coined the hotel "the Milan". Near the end of the 19th century, the hotel gained significant importance as it was frequented by diplomats and businessmen. The hotel rose to prominence in 1872 when composer Giuseppe Verdi established his residence in one of the suites, where he needed the privacy to work at the famous opera house La Scala. His suite, perfectly preserved to the present day, resembled his study at his Sant'Agata home, outside Piacenza. Subsequently, it became the property of the Milanese industrialist Pietro Polli, a friend of Giuseppe Verdi and the father of Emilio Polli, who in 1900 renovated the atrium, giving it its present appearance. The building was completely refurbished in 1931 and equipped with tap water and telephones in every room. In 1943, during World War II, the hotel was bombed, and the fourth floor was destroyed; in 1946, after the war, architect Giovanni Muzio was engaged to restore and renovate the building. The hotel was popular with fashion designers in the 1960s and 1970s when Milan began hosting annual fashion weeks. In an early 1990s renovation, a defence wall dating back to the 3rd century was brought to light and featured in one of the hotel's restaurants.

== Notable guests ==
Famous people who have stayed at the hotel include:

- Giuseppe Verdi
- Dom Pedro II, Emperor of Brazil
- Teresa Cristina, Empress of Brazil
- Enrico Caruso
- Fred Gaisberg
- Tamara de Lempicka
- Maria Callas
- Severino Gazzelloni
- Giorgio Jegher
- Vittorio de Sica
- Richard Burton
- Ernest Hemingway
