= Palazzo Melzi di Cusano =

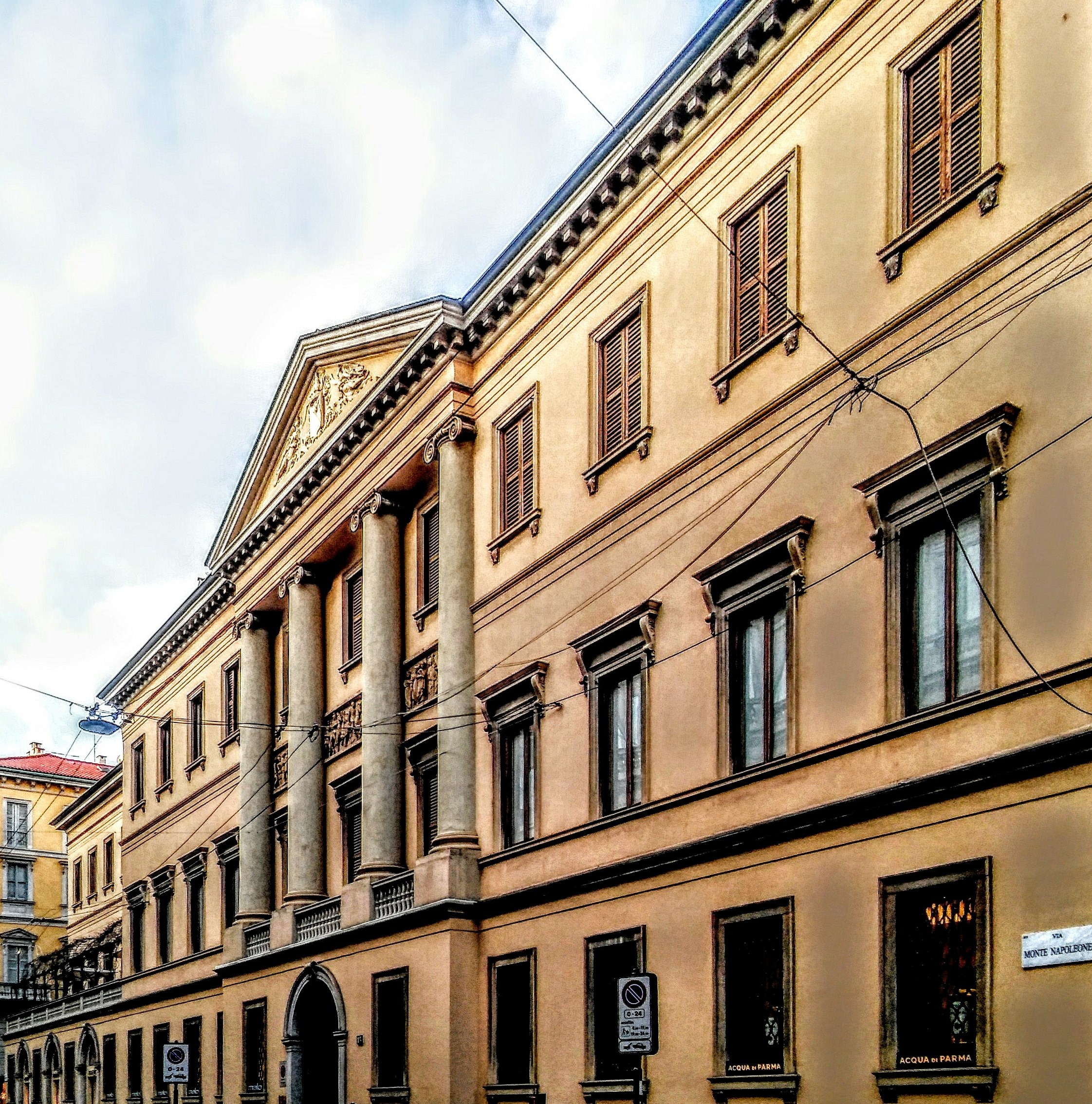
- Palazzo Melzi di Cusano in Milan
- Click on the map for a fullscreen view

General information
- Architectural style: Neoclassical
- Location: Milan, Italy
- Coordinates: 45°28′09.66″N 9°11′39.59″E

Design and construction
- Architect(s): Giovanni Battista Bareggi

Palazzo Melzi di Cusano is a historic building situated in Via Monte Napoleone in Milan, Italy.

== History ==
The building was erected in 1830. It was designed by architect Giovanni Battista Bareggi, who took inspiration from Palazzo Serbelloni.

== Description ==
The building stands along the luxurious and expensive Via Monte Napoleone. It features a Neoclassical style. The main façade includes four Ionian columns that create a loggia. Separating the lower and upper windows in the loggia, there is a bas-relief by Gaetano Monti known as the Imprese di Francesco Sforza.
