= Palazzo Tarsis =

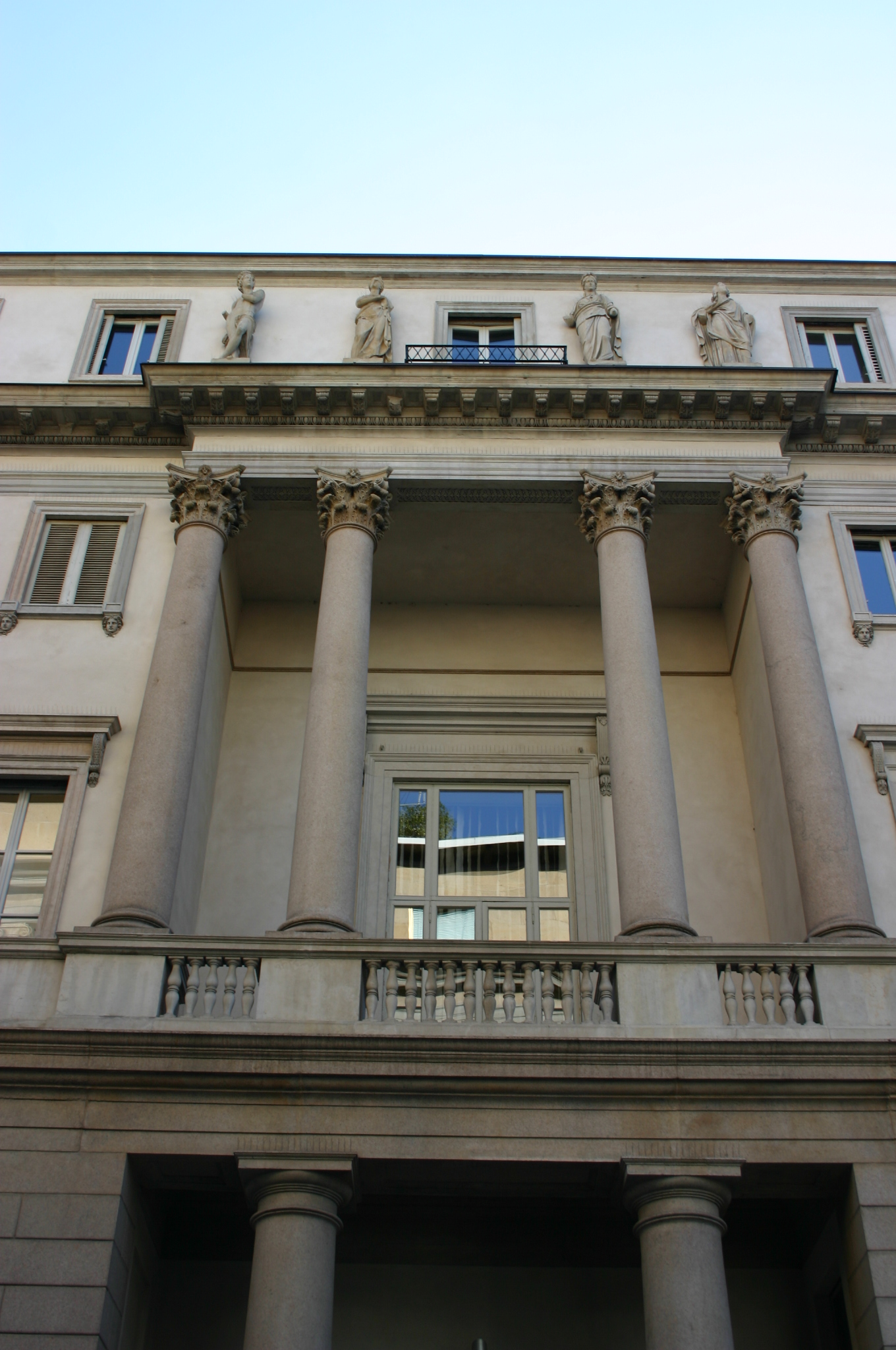
- Palazzo Tarsis in Milan
- Click on the map for a fullscreen view

General information
- Architectural style: Neoclassical
- Location: Milan, Italy
- Coordinates: 45°27′54.65″N 9°11′37.28″E

Design and construction
- Architect: Luigi Clerichetti

The Palazzo Tarsis is an 18th-century palace in Milan, northern Italy, built in the Neoclassical style. Its interiors were fully renovated after the building was bombed in 1943. Historically part of the Porta Nuova district, it is located at 1, Via San Paolo.

== History and architecture ==
Built between 1836 and 1838 for Count Paolo Tarsis by the architect Luigi Clerichetti, it stands on the site of the former San Paolo in Compito church and is one of the city's latest Neoclassical works. Its central portico with Corinthian columns is surmounted by a cornice supporting statues of the Dii Consentes sculpted by Luigi Marchesi and Gaetano Manfredini. The main entrance consists of a retracted portal with two Doric columns. Though not consistent with the style of the palace, a second entrance was added in the last half of the 20th century. Now fully restored after incendiary bombs destroyed the interiors in the Second World War, the building is still owned by the Tarsis family.

== See also ==
- Neoclassical architecture in Milan

== Bibliography ==
- Giacomo Carlo Bascapé, I palazzi della vecchia Milano, Hoepli, Milan, 1945 - pp. 25, 277. (in Italian)
- Paolo Mezzanotte, Giacomo Carlo Bascapé, Milano, nell'arte e nella storia, Bestetti, Milan, 1968 (1948) - p. 193. (in Italian)
- Livia Negri, I palazzi di Milano, Newton & Compton, Milano, 1998 - p. 318. (in Italian)
- AAVV, Bombe sulla città, Skira, Milan, 2004 - pp. 297–298. (in Italian)
