= Palazzo Orsini, Milan =

Palazzo Orsini
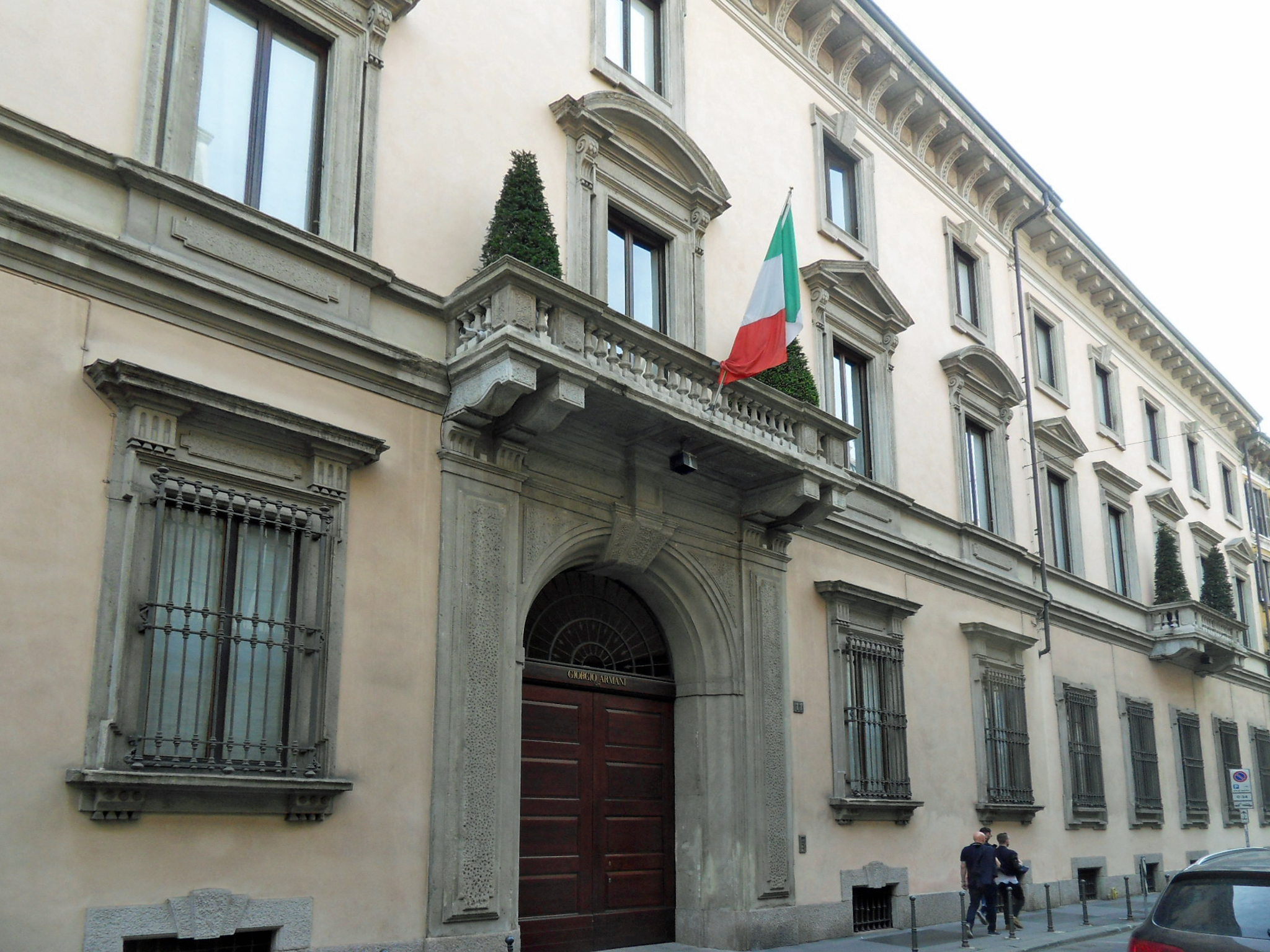
- Palazzo Orsini in Milan
- Click on the map for a fullscreen view

General information
- Architectural style: Neoclassical
- Location: Milan, Italy
- Coordinates: 45°28′16.31″N 9°11′26.13″E

The Palazzo Orsini is a neoclassic-style palace located on via Borgonuovo #11 in Milan, region of Lombardy, Italy.

== History ==
The palace was initially completed in the second half of the 17th century by members of the Secco-Borella family. It was acquired by the Orsini family, and refurbished. The next owners were the Falcò-Pio families, who owned the palace till 1918. The façade was designed by Luigi Clerichetti in the second half of the 19th century. The interiors and the grand staircase were designed and decorated by Luigi Canonica, with fresco decorations by both Giovanni Antonio Cucchi and Andrea Appiani. The building is now owned by Giorgio Armani SpA.
