= Palazzo Carcassola Grandi =

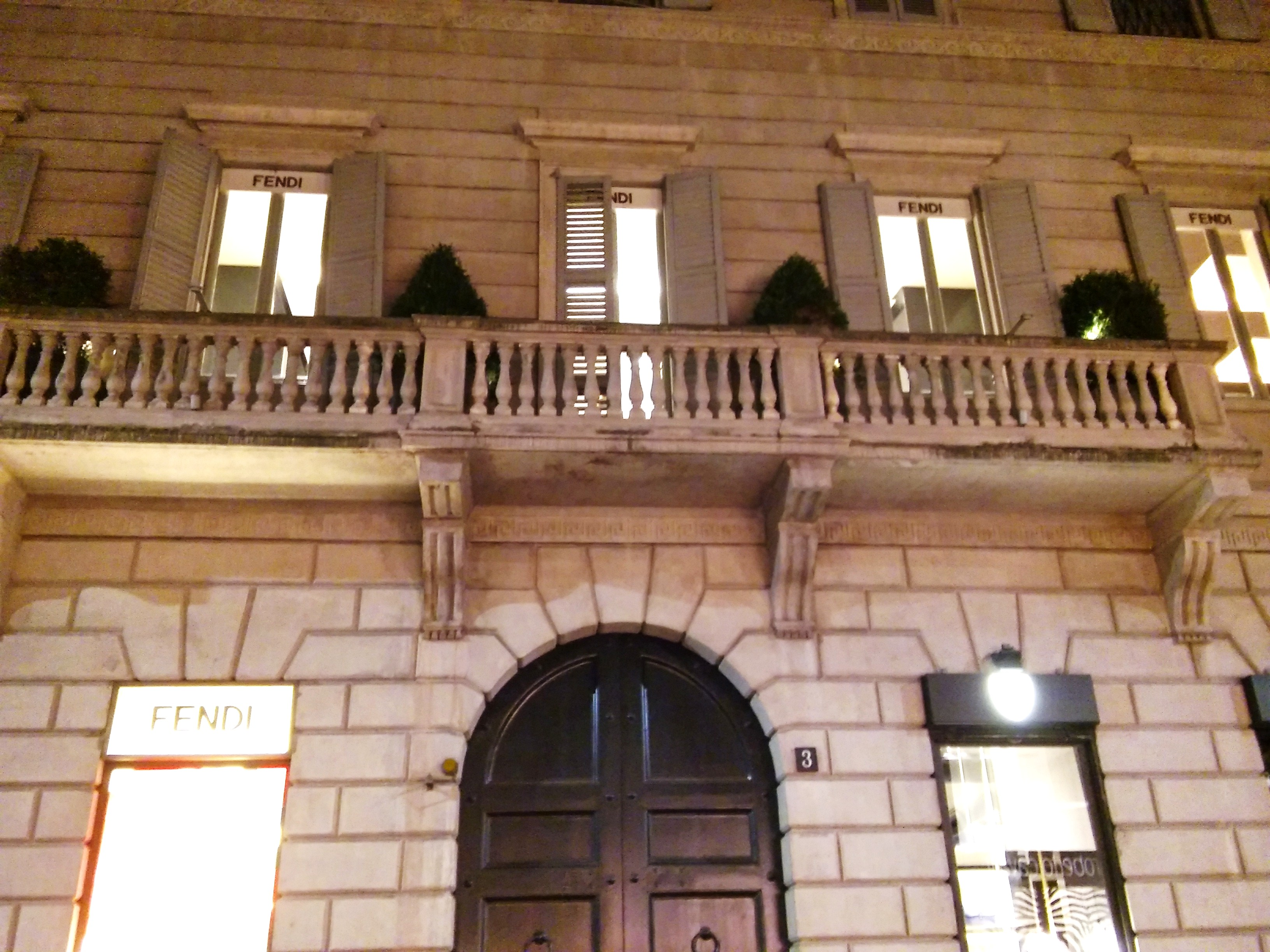
- Interactive map of the Palazzo Carcassola Grandi area

General information
- Status: In use
- Type: Palace
- Architectural style: Neoclassical
- Location: Milan, Italy, 3, via Monte Napoleone
- Coordinates: 45.467621°N 9.195978°E
- Construction started: 15th century (original core)
- Renovated: 19th century (facade)

Design and construction
- Architect: Nicola Dordoni (facade renovation)

Palazzo Carcassola Grandi is a historical palace in Milan located at via Monte Napoleone 3.

== History and description ==
The palace has a sober but elegant façade in the typical Milan neoclassical style of the early 19th century: on the ground floor decorated in rusticated ashlar smooth there are two portals crowned by the balcony monumental of the piano nobile. The main floor is then decorated with windows with entablature cornices, while on the second floor the windows are no longer decorated. Inside the palace, one can admire the original 15th-century structure, with the monumental staircase with remnants of fresco decoration and graffito, leading to a hall with wooden coffers. In the palace lived Emilio Morosini, a patriot of the Italian Risorgimento.

== Bibliography ==
=== Italian sources ===
- Attilia Lanza, Milano e i suoi palazzi: Porta Orientale, Romana e Ticinese, Libreria Meravigli Editrice, 1993.
