= UNA Hotels & Resorts =

Italian hotel chain

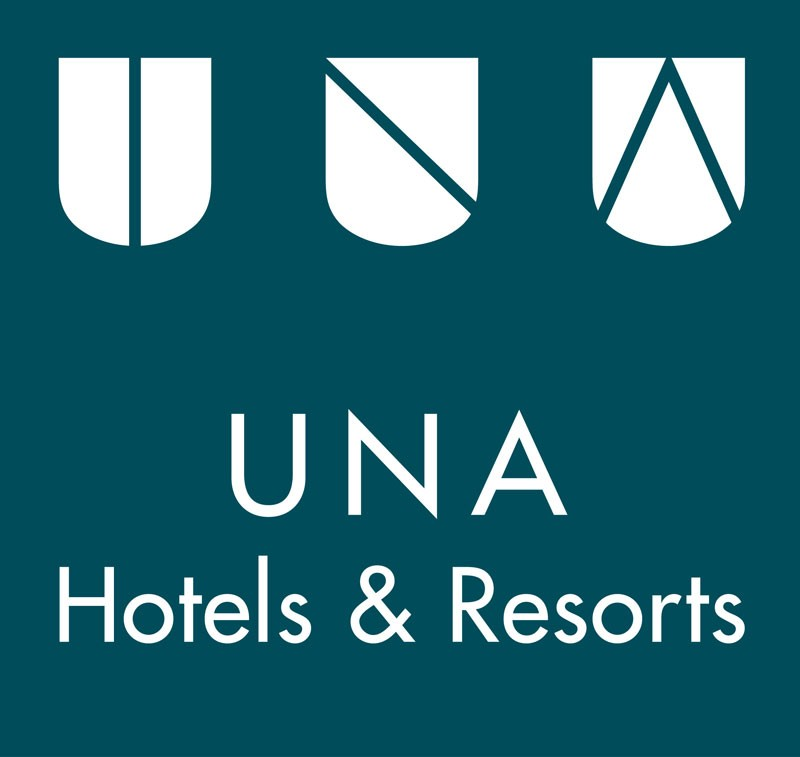
- Type: Private
- Industry: Hospitality, Hotels, Tourism
- Founded: 2000 in Florence, Italy
- Founder: UNA S.p.A.
- Headquarters: Milan, Italy
- Products: Hotels, Resorts, Country Estates
- Services: Hospitality and Management of Hotels
- Owner: Gruppo UNA S.p.A.
- Website: www.unahotels.it

UNA Hotels & Resorts is an Italian hotel chain with four-star hotels and resorts throughout Italy with more than 3000 rooms. The company also owned a country estate composed of 7 Italian luxury villas. In 2016 UNA Hotels was acquired by UNIPOL Group and merged with Atahotels into Gruppo UNA S.p.A., a new Italian hotel chain.

== History ==
UNA Hotels & Resorts was founded in November 2000 to create a new Italian hotel group focused on business.

In few years the group opened hotels in all the main Italian cities: Bologna, Naples, Catania, Rome, Venice and others in Milan, where there are 7 hotels now, including one near Malpensa airport.

In the meantime Tuscany has been a fertile territory where UNA Hotels opened its first resorts in Mugello like UNA Poggio dei Medici and the restored Villa Le Maschere, then in Versilia, where the last opening is UNA Hotel Forte dei Marmi.

- The development started in 2001 with 8 four-stars business hotels, 5 of which opened in Milan.
- In 2003 the company opened its first hotel in Florence, UNA Hotel Vittoria
- In 2004 UNA Hotels & Resorts won a contract of Autostrade per l'Italia for hotels located along the Italian highway named as UNAWAY Hotels.
- In 2016 UNA Hotels & Resorts has been acquired by UNIPOL Group and merged with Atahotels into Gruppo UNA S.p.A.

== Brands ==
UNA Hotels & Resorts developed 3 brands:

- UNA Hotels, city hotels for business travellers and tourists;
- UNA Resorts, buildings located in countryside and seaside;
- UNAWAY Hotels, for multi-target customers along the highway or near major junctions.

UNA Hotels has commissioned most of its hotels to some of the most important Italian architects as Fabio Novembre for the project of UNA Hotel Vittoria, Renzo Costa for UNA Hotel Malpensa and UNA Hotel Roma, Luca Sacchetti for UNA Hotel Napoli.
