= Palazzo del Monte, Milan =

Palazzo del Monte
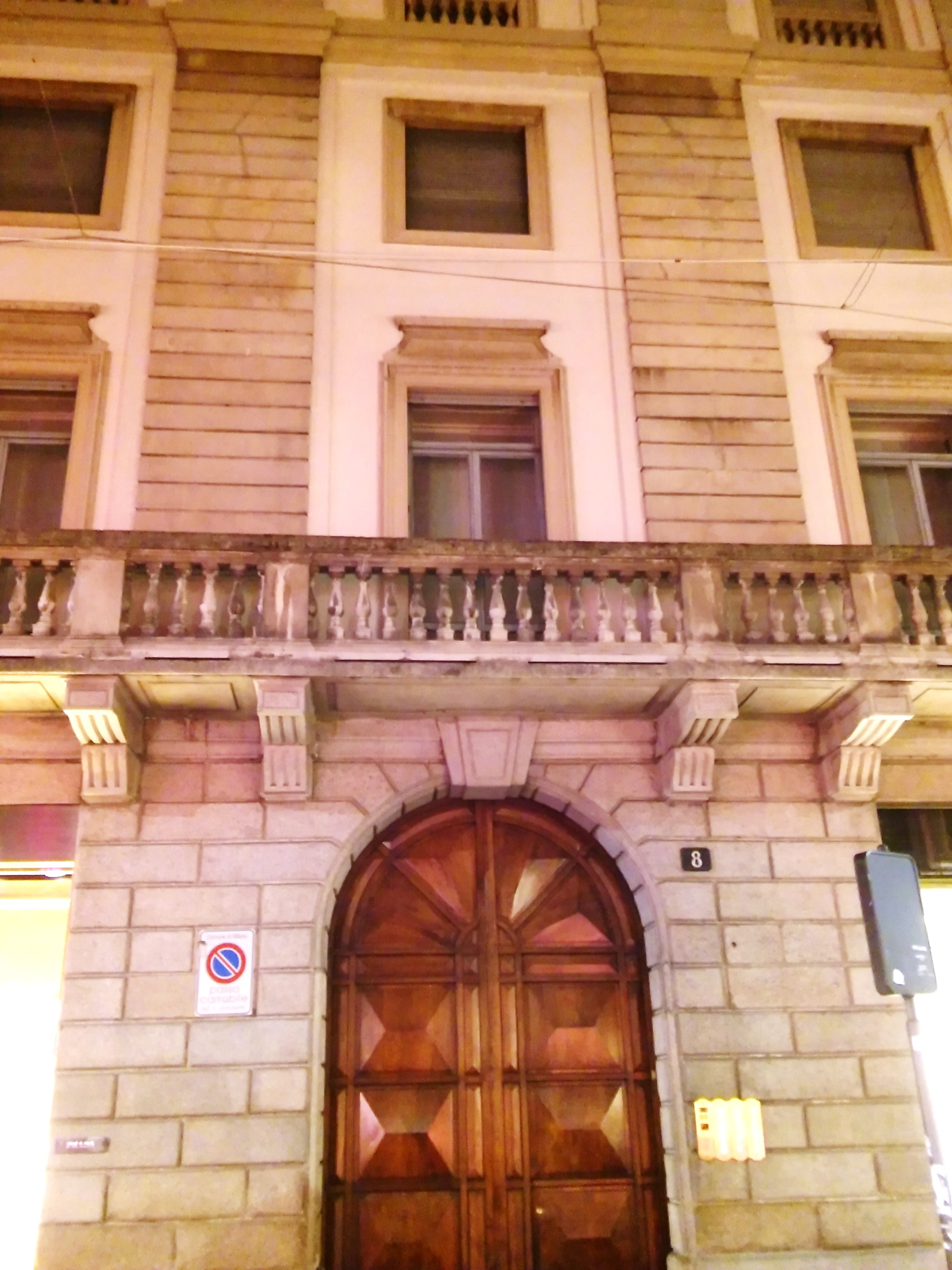
- Palazzo del Monte in Milan
- Click on the map for a fullscreen view

General information
- Architectural style: Neoclassical
- Location: Milan, Italy
- Coordinates: 45°28′04.42″N 9°11′44.36″E

Design and construction
- Architect: Giuseppe Piermarini

Palazzo del Monte is a historic building situated in Via Monte Napoleone in Milan, Italy.

== History ==
The building, designed by architect Giuseppe Piermarini, was built starting from 1782 to house the headquarters of the Monte Camerale di Santa Teresa. This institution had been founded to the debt of the state of Milan. Later on, under Napoleonic rule, the institution changed its name to Monte Napoleone, becoming the namesake for the famous street where the building stands.

In early 2024, the building was acquired by Kering for the record amount of 1.3 billion euros, making this the highest-value transaction ever in Italy involving a single asset.

== Description ==
The building stands along the luxurious and expensive Via Monte Napoleone. It features an early Neoclassical style.
