= Luigi Clerichetti =

19th-century Milanese architect, noted for his Neoclassical-style buildings

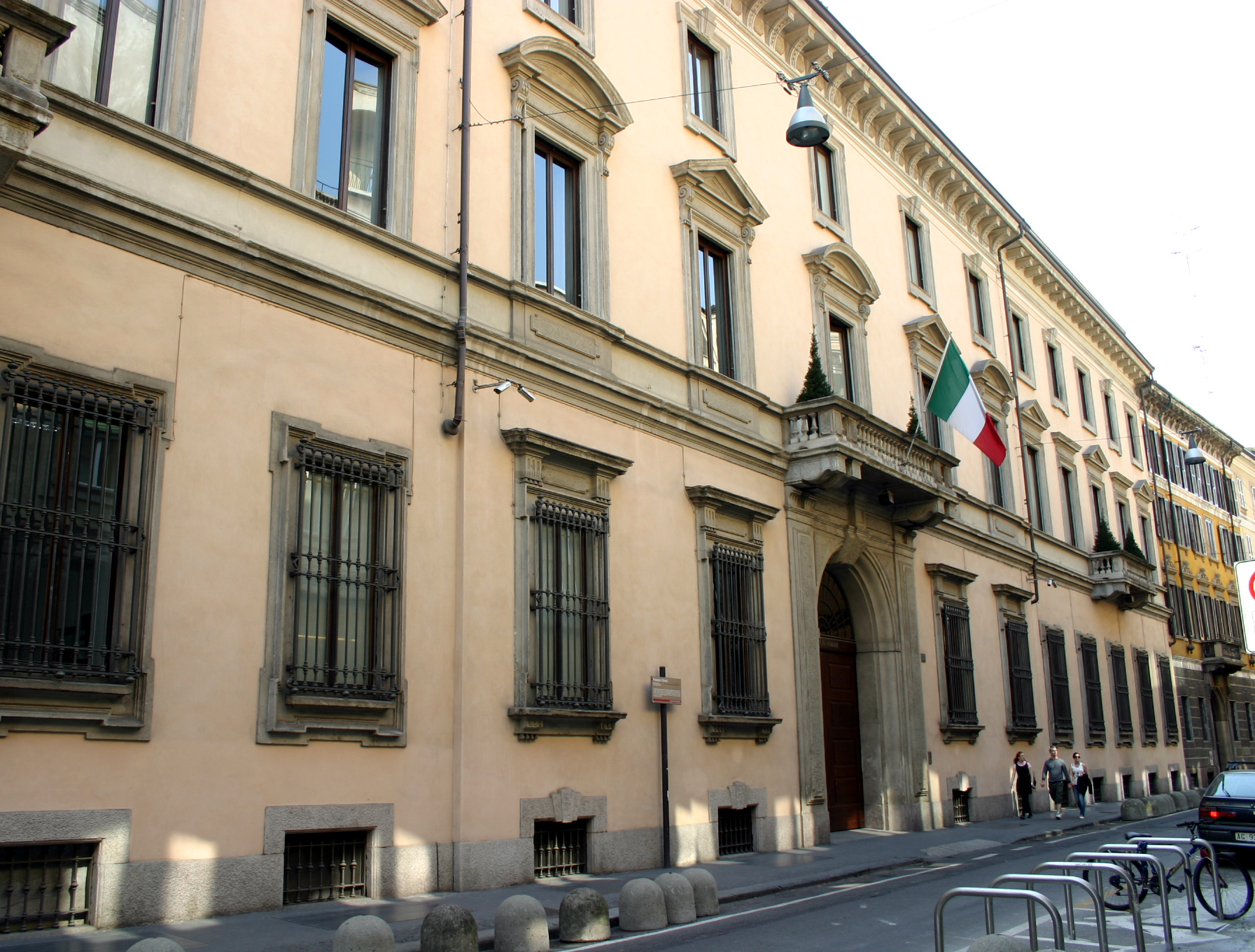
Palazzo Orsini

Luigi Clerichetti was a 19th-century Milanese architect, noted for his Neoclassical-style buildings. He designed the Palazzo Tarsis (1836–1838), and the Palazzo Gavazzi in 1838 for the wealthy Gavazzi family. He also designed the facade of the Palazzo Orsini of Milan during restoration of the 16th-century building, and the Villa Ciani in Lugano, Switzerland in 1840.
