= Palazzo Gavazzi =

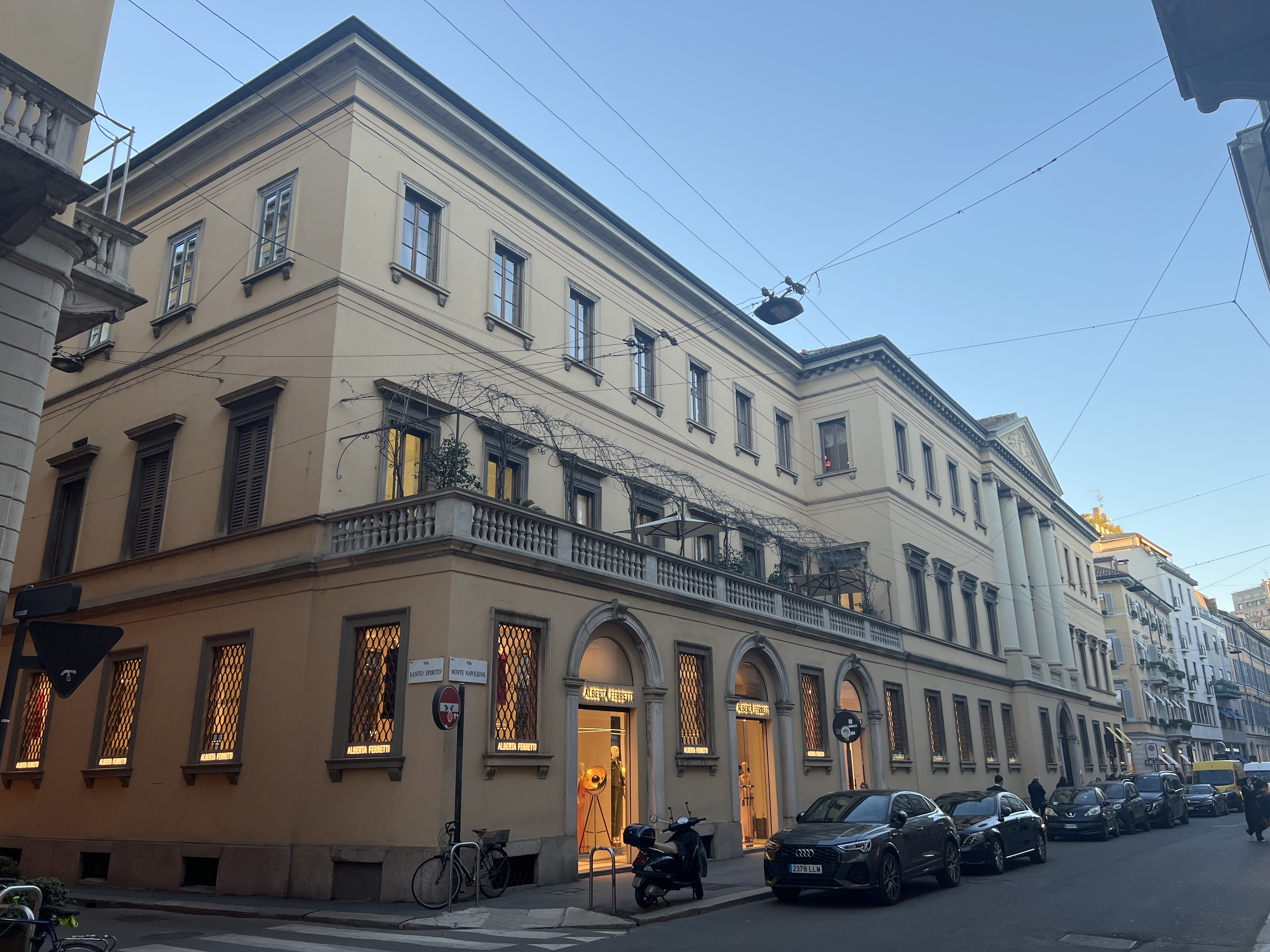
- Palazzo Gavazzi in Milan
- Click on the map for a fullscreen view

General information
- Architectural style: Neoclassical
- Location: Milan, Italy
- Coordinates: 45.4688°N 9.1919°E

Design and construction
- Architect(s): Luigi Clerichetti

Palazzo Gavazzi is a Neoclassical palace in Del Monte district, Milan, Italy.

== History ==
The building was designed by Luigi Clerichetti in 1838 for the wealthy Gavazzi family. The residence was the home of Carlo Cattaneo from 1840 to 1848.

== Description ==
The building is a typical example of the mansions built during the Restoration period. Each floor bears its own decorations; Doric columns on the ground floor and various pilasters on the first and second floors, rather than the huge decorative works which were popular at the time. The symmetrical facade, covering three levels, is centred on a portal with four Ionic half-columns supporting the first-floor balcony.
