= List of courthouses in Italy =

This is a list of courthouses in Italy.

There is at least one courthouse in every Italian province, but there may also be other lower courts serving specific districts. Courthouses in Italy vary greatly in their types. In some cases, they are historic and monumental buildings located in city centers, while in others, they are modern and functional structures built during the 20th century, especially during the Fascist era. Many of the most modern courthouses were constructed in the second half of the century, following specific architectural styles designed for judicial offices by specialized architects such as Carlo Aymonino, Gianfranco Caniggia, Leonardo Ricci, Gino Valle, Pierluigi Spadolini, Ignazio Gardella, and others.

== List ==
=== Abruzzo ===
Courthouse	Image	Province	Location	Dates	Notes
Avezzano Courthouse		L'Aquila	Avezzano; 42°2′9.12″N 13°25′41.28″E	1922–1931	
Chieti Courthouse		Chieti	Chieti; 42°21′04.1″N 14°09′58.2″E		
Lanciano Courthouse		Chieti	Lanciano; 42°13′50.47″N 14°23′42.17″E	1970s	
L'Aquila Courthouse		L'Aquila	L'Aquila; 42°21′15.51″N 13°23′22.1″E	1958–1962	Also seat of the Court of Appeal.
Pescara Courthouse		Pescara	Pescara; 42°26′58.7″N 14°13′18.1″E	1992–2004	
Sulmona Courthouse		L'Aquila	Sulmona; 42°3′4.2″N 13°55′42.5″E		
Teramo Courthouse		Teramo	Teramo; 42°39′27.74″N 13°42′42.73″E	1974–1972	
Vasto Courthouse		Chieti	Vasto; 42°7′21.51″N 14°42′29.12″E		

=== Aosta Valley ===
Courthouse	Image	Location	Dates	Notes
Aosta Courthouse		Aosta; 45°44′9.6″N 7°19′20.4″E	1931–1932	

=== Apulia ===
Courthouse	Image	Province/Metropolitan city	Location	Dates	Notes
Bari Courthouse		Bari	Bari; 41°07′23.9″N 16°51′23.35″E	1957–1959	Also seat of the Court of Appeal.
Brindisi Courthouse		Brindisi	Brindisi; 40°37′22.81″N 17°55′43.58″E	1957–1961	
Foggia Courthouse		Foggia	Foggia; 41°26′57.32″N 15°32′54.18″E	1981–1989	
Lecce Courthouse		Lecce	Lecce; 40°21′33.1″N 18°10′23.6″E	1966–1969	Also seat of the Court of Appeal.
Taranto Courthouse		Taranto	Taranto; 40°27′34.7″N 17°15′16.7″E	1975	
Trani Courthouse (Palazzo Torres)		Barletta-Andria-Trani	Trani; 41°16′54.3″N 16°25′02.5″E	16th century (built); 1811 (courthouse)	

=== Basilicata ===
Courthouse	Image	Province	Location	Dates	Notes
Lagonegro Courthouse		Potenza	Lagonegro; 40°7′29.1″N 15°45′48.8″E		
Matera Courthouse		Matera	Matera; 40°39′57.9″N 16°35′59.9″E	1972–1980	
Potenza Courthouse		Potenza	Potenza; 40°38′00.8″N 15°48′20.2″E	1972–1990	Also seat of the Court of Appeal.

=== Calabria ===
Courthouse	Image	Province/Metropolitan city	Location	Dates	Notes
Castrovillari Courthouse		Cosenza	Castrovillari; 39°49′38.27″N 16°13′11.68″E		
Catanzaro Courthouse ("Francesco Ferlaino")		Catanzaro	Catanzaro, Via Argento; 38°54′42.45″N 16°35′20.14″E	2009–2017	
Catanzaro Appellate Courthouse ("Salvatore Blasco")		Catanzaro	Catanzaro, Piazza Matteotti; 38°54′40.06″N 16°35′16.10″E	1916–1928	Seat of the Court of Appeal
Cosenza Courthouse		Cosenza	Cosenza; 39°18′39.09″N 16°15′3.64″E		
Crotone Courthouse		Crotone	Crotone; 39°4′44.17″N 17°7′22.94″E		
Lamezia Terme Courthouse		Catanzaro	Lamezia Terme; 38°58′11.9″N 16°18′55.08″E	1962–1965	
Locri Courthouse		Reggio Calabria	Locri; 38°13′57.8″N 16°15′34.8″E		
Palmi Courthouse		Reggio Calabria	Palmi; 38°21′29.4″N 15°50′54.5″E		
Paola Courthouse		Cosenza	Paola; 39°21′25.87″N 16°2′24.99″E		
Reggio Calabria Courthouse		Reggio Calabria	Reggio Calabria, Via Sant'Anna; 38°6′5.38″N 15°39′20.27″E		
Reggio Calabria Appellate Courthouse (Palazzo dei Tribunali)		Reggio Calabria	Reggio Calabria, Piazza Castello; 38°6′18.94″N 15°38′38.9″E	1925	Seat of the Court of Appeal
Vibo Valentia Courthouse		Vibo Valentia	Vibo Valentia; 38°40′15.38″N 16°5′14.68″E		

=== Campania ===
Courthouse	Image	Province/Metropolitan city	Location	Dates	Notes
Avellino Courthouse		Avellino	Avellino; 40°54′56.3″N 14°47′10.9″E	1977	
Benevento Courthouse		Benevento	Benevento; 41°7′45.3″N 14°47′13.5″E	1983	
Naples Courthouse		Naples	Naples; 40°51′35.63″N 14°16′59.43″E	1980–1995	Also seat of the Court of Appeal.
Nocera Inferiore Courthouse		Salerno	Nocera Inferiore; 40°45′4.53″N 14°39′4.18″E	1882	
Nola Courthouse (Palazzo Orsini)		Naples	Nola; 40°55′35.5″N 14°31′31.9″E	15th century (built); 1994 (courthouse)	
North Naples Courthouse (Aragonese Castle)		Caserta	Aversa; 40°58′44.7″N 14°12′14.8″E	1492 (rebuilt); 2013 (courthouse)	
Salerno Courthouse		Salerno	Salerno; 40°40′43.5″N 14°46′27.6″E	2001–2018	Also seat of the Court of Appeal.
Santa Maria Capua Vetere Courthouse		Caserta	Santa Maria Capua Vetere; 41°04′41.9″N 14°15′27.9″E	1987	
Torre Annunziata Courthouse		Salerno	Torre Annunziata; 40°45′41.20″N 14°25′49.07″E	1989–1994	
Vallo della Lucania Courthouse		Salerno	Vallo della Lucania; 40°13′22.38″N 15°15′57.68″E	2005	

=== Emilia-Romagna ===
Courthouse	Image	Province/Metropolitan city	Location	Dates	Notes
Bologna Courthouse (Palazzo Legnani Pizzardo)		Bologna	Bologna, Via Farini; 44°29′28.4″N 11°20′31.0″E	16th century (built); 2015 (courthouse)	
Bologna Appellate Courthouse (Palazzo Ranuzzi)		Bologna	Bologna, Piazza Tribunali; 44°29′16.86″N 11°20′36.48″E	17th century (built); 1873 (courthouse)	Seat of the Court of Appeal
Ferrara Courthouse		Ferrara	Ferrara; 44°50′22.5″N 11°37′18.2″E	1676 (built); 1981–1985 (courthouse)	
Forlì Courthouse		Forlì-Cesena	Forlì; 44°13′19.0″N 12°02′37.4″E	1968	
Modena Courthouse		Modena	Modena; 44°38′46.13″N 10°55′46.53″E		
Parma Courthouse		Parma	Parma; 44°47′58.4″N 10°19′34.9″E	1844	
Piacenza Courthouse		Piacenza	Piacenza; 45°03′07.8″N 9°41′56.6″E	15th century	
Ravenna Courthouse		Ravenna	Ravenna; 44°24′15.85″N 12°11′5.92″E	1980	
Reggio Emilia Courthouse		Reggio Emilia	Reggio Emilia; 44°42′32.5″N 10°38′06.1″E	1984–1992	
Rimini Courthouse		Rimini	Rimini; 44°02′50.8″N 12°34′39.5″E	1991–2004	

=== Friuli-Venezia Giulia ===
Courthouse	Image	Province	Location	Dates	Notes
Gorizia Courthouse		Gorizia	Gorizia; 45°56′25.47″N 13°37′15.14″E	1899–1902	
Pordenone Courthouse		Pordenone	Pordenone; 45°57′21.65″N 12°39′49.42″E	1964–1966	
Trieste Courthouse		Trieste	Trieste; 45°39′18.4″N 13°46′46.1″E	1912–1929	Also seat of the Court of Appeal.
Udine Courthouse		Udine	Udine; 46°3′36.08″N 13°14′8.31″E	1782–1833	

=== Lazio ===
Courthouse	Image	Province/Metropolitan city	Location	Dates	Notes
Cassino Courthouse		Frosinone	Cassino; 41°29′30.5″N 13°49′50.2″E	1952–1969	
Civitavecchia Courthouse		Rome Capital	Civitavecchia; 42°6′0.37″N 11°47′58.36″E		
Frosinone Courthouse		Frosinone	Frosinone; 41°38′27.1″N 13°19′48″E		
Latina Courthouse		Latina	Latina; 41°28′5.3″N 12°54′41.1″E		
Rieti Courthouse		Rieti	Rieti; 42°24′1.8″N 12°51′25.3″E		
Palace of Justice of Rome		Rome Capital	Rome, Piazza Cavour; 41°54′15″N 12°28′13″E	1888–1910	Seat of the Supreme Court of Cassation
Rome Courthouse		Rome Capital	Rome, Piazzale Clodio; 41°54′59.5″N 12°27′05.4″E	1958–1969	Also seat of the Court of Appeal.
Tivoli Courthouse		Rome Capital	Tivoli; 41°57′33.47″N 12°47′42.17″E	1729	
Velletri Courthouse		Rome Capital	Velletri; 41°41′19.8″N 12°47′15.5″E		
Viterbo Courthouse		Viterbo	Viterbo; 42°25′42.3″N 12°5′31.8″E		

=== Liguria ===
Courthouse	Image	Province/Metropolitan city	Location	Dates	Notes
Genoa Courthouse		Genoa	Genoa; 44°24′27.81″N 8°56′16.37″E	1966–1974	Also seat of the Court of Appeal.
Imperia Courthouse		Imperia	Imperia; 43°53′41.2″N 8°02′22″E		
La Spezia Courthouse		La Spezia	La Spezia; 44°6′47.09″N 9°50′19.90″E	1990–1994	
Savona Courthouse		Savona	Savona; 44°18′22.9″N 8°28′38.9″E	1981–1987	

=== Lombardy ===
Courthouse	Image	Province/Metropolitan city	Location	Dates	Notes
Bergamo Courthouse		Bergamo	Bergamo; 45°41′42.3″N 9°39′56.4″E	2003–2008	
Brescia Courthouse		Brescia	Brescia; 45°31′51.30″N 10°13′14.03″E	1999–2004	Also seat of the Court of Appeal.
Busto Arsizio Courthouse		Varese	Busto Arsizio; 45°37′09.7″N 8°51′15.9″E		
Como Courthouse		Como	Como; 45°48′23.33″N 9°5′12.29″E	1968	
Cremona Courthouse		Cremona	Cremona; 45°07′59.7″N 10°01′06.7″E	1799	
Lecco Courthouse		Lecco	Lecco; 45°51′25.8″N 9°24′22.4″E		
Lodi Courthouse		Lodi	Lodi; 45°19′07″N 9°29′54.2″E		
Mantua Courthouse		Mantua	Mantua; 45°9′12.66″N 10°47′18.27″E		
Milan Courthouse		Milan	Milan; 45°27′41.3″N 9°12′04.9″E	1932–1940	Also seat of the Court of Appeal.
Monza Courthouse		Monza and Brianza	Monza; 45°35′7.81″N 9°16′39.29″E		
Pavia Courthouse		Pavia	Pavia; 45°11′11.7″N 9°09′02.9″E		
Sondrio Courthouse		Sondrio	Sondrio; 46°10′4.28″N 9°52′10.67″E		
Varese Courthouse		Varese	Varese; 45°49′18.16″N 8°49′39.82″E		

=== Marche ===
Courthouse	Image	Province	Location	Dates	Notes
Ancona Courthouse		Ancona	Ancona, Corso Mazzini; 43°37′05.6″N 13°30′53.7″E	1884 (built); 1982–1989 (renovated)	
Ancona Appellate Courthouse		Ancona	Ancona, Via Carducci; 43°37′07.7″N 13°30′48.5″E	2000–2001	Seat of the Court of Appeal
Ascoli Piceno Courthouse		Ascoli Piceno	Ascoli Piceno; 42°51′11.43″N 13°34′24.59″E	1939–1952	
Fermo Courthouse		Fermo	Fermo; 43°9′43.16″N 13°42′50.08″E		
Macerata Courthouse		Macerata	Macerata; 43°17′42.5″N 13°26′59.8″E	1967–1973	
Pesaro Courthouse		Pesaro-Urbino	Pesaro; 43°54′20.2″N 12°54′47.8″E	2002–2005	
Urbino Courthouse		Pesaro-Urbino	Urbino; 43°43′39.50″N 12°38′5.83″E	18th century (built)	

=== Molise ===
Courthouse	Image	Province	Location	Dates	Notes
Campobasso Courthouse		Campobasso	Campobasso; 41°33′28.17″N 14°39′36.18″E	1930–1936	Also seat of the Court of Appeal.
Isernia Courthouse		Isernia	Isernia; 41°35′37.2″N 14°13′53.6″E	1970	
Larino Courthouse		Campobasso	Larino; 41°48′19.38″N 14°55′11.37″E		

=== Piedmont ===
Courthouse	Image	Province/Metropolitan city	Location	Dates	Notes
Alessandria Courthouse		Alessandria	Alessandria; 44°54′36.8″N 8°36′29.3″E	1939–1940	
Asti Courthouse		Asti	Asti; 44°53′46.86″N 8°11′52.90″E		
Biella Courthouse		Biella	Biella; 45°34′2.35″N 8°3′28.4″E		
Cuneo Courthouse		Cuneo	Cuneo; 44°23′21.24″N 7°32′54.78″E		
Ivrea Courthouse		Turin	Ivrea; 45°27′29.5″N 7°52′52.5″E		
Novara Courthouse (Palazzo Cacciapiatti Fossati)		Novara	Novara; 45°26′46.1″N 8°37′36.4″E	1674 (built); 2003 (courthouse)	
Turin Courthouse		Turin	Turin; 45°04′15.06″N 7°39′27.9″E	1990–2001	Also seat of the Court of Appeal.
Verbania Courthouse		Verbano-Cusio-Ossola	Verbania; 45°55′45.17″N 8°33′14.33″E		
Vercelli Courthouse (Visconti Castle)		Vercelli	Vercelli; 45°19′40.66″N 8°25′33.35″E	1290 (built); 1926 (courthouse)	

=== Sardinia ===
Courthouse	Image	Province/Metropolitan city	Location	Dates	Notes
Cagliari Courthouse		Cagliari	Cagliari; 39°12′59″N 9°7′36″E	1933–1938	Also seat of the Court of Appeal.
Lanusei Courthouse		Nuoro	Lanusei; 39°52′47.94″N 9°32′14.80″E		
Nuoro Courthouse		Nuoro	Nuoro; 40°19′7.42″N 9°20′5.35″E		
Oristano Courthouse		Oristano	Oristano; 39°54′10.3″N 8°35′15.6″E		
Sassari Courthouse		Sassari	Sassari; 40°43′24.24″N 8°33′56.16″E	1929–1941	
Tempio Pausania Courthouse		Sassari	Tempio Pausania; 40°53′55.57″N 9°6′11.74″E		

=== Sicily ===
Courthouse	Image	Province/Metropolitan city	Location	Dates	Notes
Agrigento Courthouse		Agrigento	Agrigento; 37°19′22.3″N 13°35′22.8″E	2002	
Barcellona Pozzo di Gotto Courthouse		Messina	Barcellona Pozzo di Gotto; 38°08′21.8″N 15°13′13″E		
Caltagirone Courthouse		Catania	Caltagirone; 37°13′12.91″N 14°31′36.54″E		
Caltanissetta Courthouse		Caltanissetta	Caltanissetta; 37°29′39.48″N 14°2′48.45″E		
Catania Courthouse		Catania	Catania; 37°30′54.7″N 15°05′33.8″E	1937–1953	Also seat of the Court of Appeal.
Enna Courthouse		Enna	Enna; 37°34′02.7″N 14°16′09.7″E		
Gela Courthouse		Caltanissetta	Gela; 37°03′56.6″N 14°15′41.4″E		
Marsala Courthouse		Trapani	Marsala; 37°48′24.33″N 12°26′26.1″E		
Messina Courthouse		Messina	Messina; 38°11′18.3″N 15°33′08.5″E	1913–1928	Also seat of the Court of Appeal.
Palermo Courthouse		Palermo	Palermo; 38°7′7.11″N 13°21′7.1″E	1938–1957	Also seat of the Court of Appeal.
Patti Courthouse		Messina	Patti; 38°8′35.63″N 14°57′57.41″E		
Ragusa Courthouse		Ragusa	Ragusa; 36°55′26.0″N 14°43′43.7″E	1965–1969	
Sciacca Courthouse		Agrigento	Sciacca; 37°30′27.7″N 13°04′07.4″E	1990	
Syracuse Courthouse		Syracuse	Syracuse; 37°05′19.4″N 15°16′34.4″E		
Termini Imerese Courthouse		Palermo	Termini Imerese; 37°58′51.9″N 13°41′36.93″E		
Trapani Courthouse		Trapani	Trapani; 38°00′55.6″N 12°30′55.1″E		

=== Trentino-South Tyrol ===
Courthouse	Image	Province	Location	Dates	Notes
Bolzano Courthouse		Bolzano	Bolzano; 46°29′53.15″N 11°20′20.96″E	1939	
Rovereto Courthouse		Trento	Rovereto; 45°53′28.5″N 11°02′10.1″E	1913	
Trento Courthouse		Trento	Trento; 46°3′57.38″N 11°7′33.81″E	1881	Also seat of the Court of Appeal.

=== Tuscany ===
Courthouse	Image	Province/Metropolitan city	Location	Dates	Notes
Arezzo Courthouse		Arezzo	Arezzo; 43°27′47.3″N 11°53′30.3″E	2004–2008	
Florence Courthouse		Florence	Florence; 43°47′43.59″N 11°13′33.12″E	1999–2012	Also seat of the Court of Appeal.
Grosseto Courthouse		Grosseto	Grosseto; 42°45′54.8″N 11°7′10.6″E	1959–1964	
Livorno Courthouse		Livorno	Livorno; 43°33′15″N 10°18′32.44″E	1880	
Lucca Courthouse (Palazzo Galli Tassi)		Lucca	Lucca; 43°50′39.7″N 10°29′56.1″E		
Massa Courthouse		Massa-Carrara	Massa; 44°2′6.03″N 10°8′4.86″E	1967–1976	
Pisa Courthouse		Pisa	Pisa; 43°42′57.9″N 10°24′23″E	1938–1958	
Pistoia Courthouse (Palazzo Pretorio)		Pistoia	Pistoia; 43°56′0.23″N 10°55′0.89″E		
Prato Courthouse		Prato	Prato; 43°51′54.01″N 11°6′30.12″E		
Siena Courthouse		Siena	Siena; 43°19′26.52″N 11°19′34.21″E	1980	

=== Umbria ===
Courthouse	Image	Province	Location	Dates	Notes
Perugia Courthouse (Palazzo delle Poste)		Perugia	Perugia, Piazza Matteotti 1; 43°06′40″N 12°23′22.3″E		
Perugia Appellate Courthouse (Palazzo del Capitano del Popolo)		Perugia	Perugia, Piazza Matteotti 22; 43°6′39.83″N 12°23′23.7″E		Seat of the Court of Appeal.
Spoleto Courthouse		Perugia	Spoleto; 42°44′05.9″N 12°44′09.8″E		
Terni Courthouse		Terni	Terni; 42°33′33.4″N 12°38′47.5″E		

=== Veneto ===
Courthouse	Image	Province/Metropolitan city	Location	Dates	Notes
Belluno Courthouse		Belluno	Belluno; 46°8′30.25″N 12°12′50.86″E		
Padua Courthouse		Padua	Padua; 45°24′52.77″N 11°53′13.86″E	1986–1993	
Rovigo Courthouse		Rovigo	Rovigo; 45°04′20.9″N 11°47′26.4″E	1871–1873	
Treviso Courthouse		Treviso	Treviso; 45°39′49.53″N 12°13′55.49″E		
Venice Courthouse		Venice	Venice, Santa Croce; 45°26′13.42″N 12°18′57.12″E		
Venice Appellate Courthouse (Palazzo Grimani)		Venice	Venice, San Marco; 45°26′10.5″N 12°19′58.9″E		Seat of the Court of Appeal
Verona Courthouse		Verona	Verona; 45°25′54.5″N 10°59′38.6″E		
Vicenza Courthouse		Vicenza	Vicenza; 45°32′27.32″N 11°33′21.97″E	2006–2012	

== Abolished courthouses ==
This list includes Italian courthouses whose courts have been abolished. These buildings have generally been repurposed for other uses, but in some cases they continued to house some judicial offices, even after losing the court. The list does not include former locations whose courts have been relocated to other buildings, nor historical courthouses from periods prior to Italian unification.

Courthouse	Image	Region	Location	Dates	Notes
Acqui Terme Courthouse		Piedmont	Acqui Terme		
Alba Courthouse		Piedmont	Alba		
Ariano Irpino Courthouse		Campania	Ariano Irpino		
Bassano del Grappa Courthouse		Veneto	Bassano del Grappa		
Camerino Courthouse		Marche	Camerino		
Casale Monferrato Courthouse		Piedmont	Casale Monferrato		
Chiavari Courthouse		Liguria	Chiavari		
Crema Courthouse		Lombardy	Crema		
Legnago Courthouse		Veneto	Legnago		
Lucera Courthouse		Apulia	Lucera		
Melfi Courthouse		Basilicata	Melfi		
Mistretta Courthouse		Sicily	Mistretta		
Modica Courthouse		Sicily	Modica		
Mondovì Courthouse		Piedmont	Mondovì		
Montepulciano Courthouse		Tuscany	Montepulciano		
Nicosia Courthouse		Sicily	Nicosia		
Orvieto Courthouse		Umbria	Orvieto		
Pinerolo Courthouse		Piedmont	Pinerolo		
Rossano Courthouse		Calabria	Rossano		
Sala Consilina Courthouse		Campania	Sala Consilina		
Saluzzo Courthouse		Piedmont	Saluzzo		
Sanremo Courthouse		Liguria	Sanremo		
Sant'Angelo dei Lombardi Courthouse		Campania	Sant'Angelo dei Lombardi		
Soave Courthouse		Veneto	Soave		
Tolmezzo Courthouse		Friuli-Venezia Giulia	Tolmezzo		
Tortona Courthouse		Piedmont	Tortona		
Vigevano Courthouse		Lombardy	Vigevano		
Voghera Courthouse		Lombardy	Voghera		

== See also ==
- List of courthouses
