= Modena Courthouse =

Building in Modena, Italy

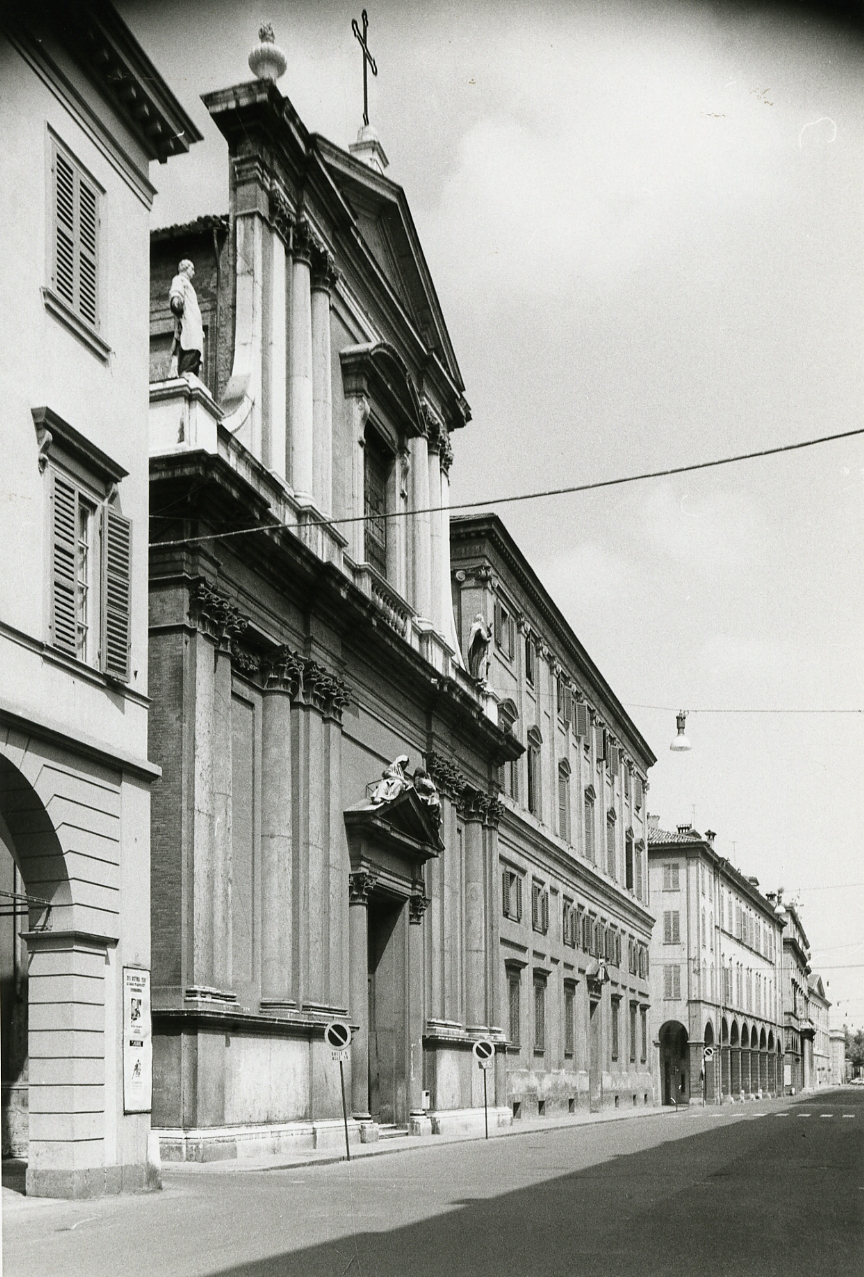
- The courthouse (right) next to the church of San Vincenzo. Photo by Paolo Monti, 1973
- Interactive map of the Modena Courthouse area

General information
- Location: Modena, Emilia-Romagna, Italy
- Coordinates: 44°38′46.13″N 10°55′46.53″E
- Construction started: 1675

Design and construction
- Architect: Guarino Guarini

The Modena Courthouse (Italian: Palazzo di Giustizia di Modena, lit. 'Palace of Justice of Modena') is a judicial building located on Corso Canalgrande in Modena, Italy. The structure occupies part of the former convent of the Theatine Order, adjacent to the church of San Vincenzo, and has served as the seat of the local judiciary since the second half of the 20th century.

== History ==
The current courthouse was originally constructed as part of the former convent of the Theatine Order, situated in the historic centre of Modena alongside the church of San Vincenzo. The convent complex was commissioned by the Theatines, who also promoted the construction of the adjacent church beginning in 1617, on the site of a 13th-century place of worship. While the construction of the church extended over a long period and was completed only in 1761, the design of the convent dates to 1675 and is attributed to Guarino Guarini, one of the most prominent Modenese architects of his time.

The convent remained the property of the Theatine Order until 1782, when the order was suppressed and expelled from the Duchy of Este. Its assets were transferred to the Opera Pia. After a brief period of approximately ten years under the Augustinians, the church continued to serve religious functions, while the convent building underwent repeated changes in use. During the Napoleonic era, the former convent was adapted for secular purposes and used as a warehouse, a military barracks, and accommodation for officers. In 1823, it was reassigned as a convitto legale, a residential college for students of law.

In the 1960s, the former Theatine convent underwent extensive renovation and was converted into the Modena Courthouse. This change of use followed the decision to demolish the previous courthouse in Piazza Grande, designed by Luigi Giacomelli, which had become inadequate due to spatial constraints and maintenance costs. After the sale and demolition of that building in 1963, and the construction of a new structure on the site designed by Gio Ponti, judicial functions were permanently transferred to the renovated convent.

== Description ==
The principal surviving façade of the Modena Courthouse reflects a sober and restrained architectural language. It is horizontally divided into two main sections, each articulated by two different levels of windows. The larger, rectangular windows are framed and decorated with pediments, while the smaller, square windows are simpler in design. The central entrance is emphasized by a strongly projecting rectangular pediment bearing the coat of arms of the Theatines, a reminder of the building's original religious function.
