= Palazzo dei Tribunali =

Judiciary building in Reggio Calabria, Italy

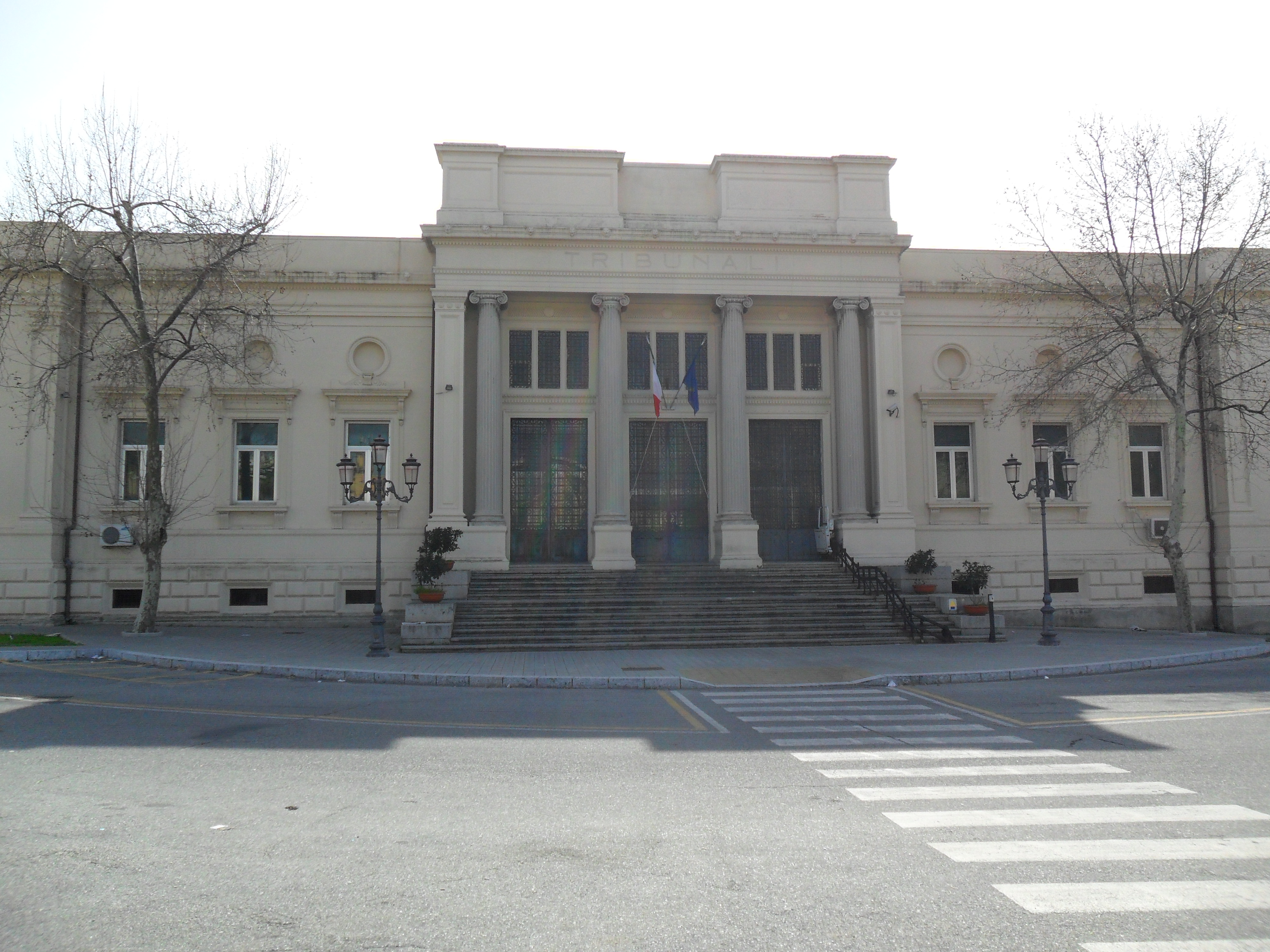
- Interactive map of the Palazzo dei Tribunali area

General information
- Type: Courthouse
- Location: Reggio Calabria, Calabria, Italy
- Coordinates: 38°6′18.94″N 15°38′38.9″E
- Construction started: 1915
- Completed: 1925
- Opening: 1926; 100 years ago

Design and construction
- Architect: Paolo Farinelli

The Palazzo dei Tribunali is a judicial building located on Piazza Castello in Reggio Calabria, Italy. It houses the local seat of the Court of Appeal.

== History ==
The Court of Reggio was previously located in the Dominican convent on Via Osanna. Due to the 1908 earthquake, the judicial offices were relocated to temporary buildings while awaiting the construction of a new courthouse.

The construction of the new courthouse was part of a broad urban renewal and reconstruction project launched after the earthquake by engineer Pietro De Nava. This plan included the development of numerous public buildings in the area near the Castle. The design of the building was entrusted to the architect Paolo Farinelli from Naples and was completed in 1925. It became operational the following year.

In 2011, it was designated as a site of historical and artistic interest by the Ministry of Cultural Heritage and Activities. On 12 November 2020, the building was damaged by a severe fire.

== Description ==
The building is designed in a neoclassical style. The main façade is adorned with flat Ionic pilasters on the side and central projections. The main staircase, characterized by a single order, opens onto a high podium supported by majestic Ionic columns. These columns frame the large tripartite entrance, above which are three tripartite windows, also decorated with iron grilles.
