= Como Courthouse =

Judiciary building in Como, Italy

- Interactive map of the Como Courthouse area

General information
- Type: Courthouse
- Location: Como, Lombardy, Italy
- Coordinates: 45°48′23.33″N 9°5′12.29″E
- Construction started: 1959
- Completed: 1968
- Inaugurated: October 1968; 57 years ago

Design and construction
- Architects: Gianpaolo Allevi, Armen Manoukian

The Como Courthouse (Palazzo di Giustizia) is a judicial complex located on Viale Lorenzo Spallino in Como, Italy.

== History ==
The courthouse in Como occupies a site formerly used as a Franciscan convent, later converted into a military barracks. The current building was the outcome of a national design competition launched in 1959, which awarded first prize ex aequo to two teams with contrasting architectural visions.

The first, led by Francesco Buzzi Ceriani and Giancarlo Rigoni, proposed a rationalist, setback volume forming the backdrop to a new public square. The second, by Gianpaolo Allevi and Armen Manoukian, with artistic contributions from Mario Radice and Ico Parisi, favored a more expressive solution based on the interpenetration of curved volumes. The two groups were later invited to merge their proposals, though the final design was signed only by selected original members.

The building was reduced in scale during construction and inaugurated in October 1968.

In the mid-1990s, the complex underwent major renovation and vertical extension, adding two floors and covering the original concrete surfaces with stone cladding on the lower levels and smooth plaster on the upper ones.

== Description ==
The building is a compact cubic volume, organized around a central square courtyard and set atop a raised plaza, slightly recessed from the tree-lined boulevard that follows Como's ancient city walls. Access occurs from the short sides of the elevated plaza, which features a sculpture by Luigi Grosso (1971).

On the eastern side, the building faces the former church of San Francesco, now a cultural center. The granite-clad base, cut horizontally by narrow ribbon windows, aligns with the church's Renaissance pronaos, establishing a proportional dialogue between old and new.

Above the base, the five-storey upper block—originally four—terminates with a flat roof and wide cornice. The façades, once in raw exposed concrete, now display a uniform treatment with horizontal bands of windows and alternating finishes in stone and plaster, resulting from the 1990s renovation.

== Sources ==
- Cani, Fabio (April 2016). "096. Palazzo di Giustizia" (PDF). XXCO – L'architettura del XX secolo in provincia di Como.
- Vahramian, Herman (2009). Armen Manoukian: materiali per una biografia, 1932-1995. Milan: Ares. pp. 52–57.
- Zevi, Bruno (1978). Cronache di architettura. Rome–Bari: Laterza. p. 293.
