= Cuneo Courthouse =

Judiciary building in Cuneo, Italy

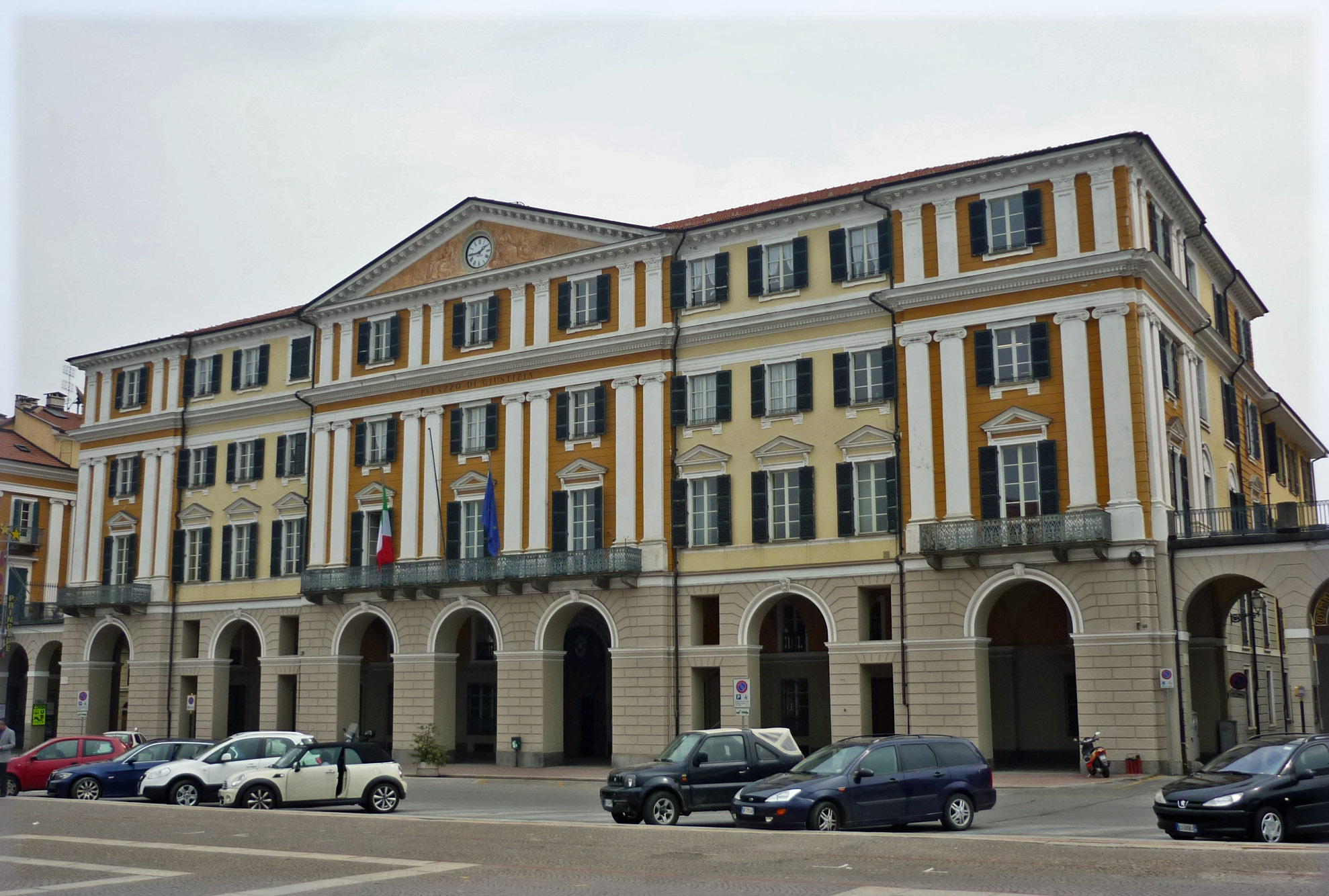

General information
- Type: Courthouse
- Location: Cuneo, Piedmont, Italy
- Coordinates: 44°23′21.24″N 7°32′54.78″E
- Completed: 1866

The Cuneo Courthouse (Italian: Palazzo di Giustizia di Cuneo, lit. 'Palace of Justice of Cuneo') is a judicial building located on Piazza Galimberti in Cuneo, Italy.

== History ==
The Cuneo Courthouse stands on Piazza Galimberti, the city's main square, developed in the 19th century as a neoclassical civic space. The square was designed in 1835 by the engineer and architect Benedetto Brunati, with construction proceeding in several phases.

In 1860, under mayor Carlo Brunet, the original plan of the square was expanded to include additional buildings. As part of this enlargement, the courthouse was commissioned as a prominent structure, intentionally designed to be longer and taller than the surrounding palaces. The building was completed and inaugurated in 1866, contributing to the final configuration of Piazza Galimberti.

During the final years of World War II, the courthouse was temporarily used as a meeting point for volunteers of the Unione Nazionale Protezione Antiaerea (UNPA).

Following the consolidation of the judicial offices of Mondovì and Saluzzo, the Civil Section, the Supervisory Office, and the Cuneo Bar Association were relocated to a secondary seat inaugurated on 31 May 2017 in Palazzo Lattes.
