= Potenza Courthouse =

Judiciary building in Potenza, Italy

- Interactive map of the Potenza Courthouse area

General information
- Type: Courthouse
- Location: Potenza, Basilicata, Italy
- Coordinates: 40°38′00.8″N 15°48′20.2″E
- Completed: 1990

Design and construction
- Architect: Amerigo Lapenna
- Engineer: Luciano Petracca, Franco De Pascali

The Potenza Courthouse (Italian: Palazzo di Giustizia di Potenza, lit. 'Palace of Justice of Potenza') is a judicial complex located on Via Nazario Sauro in Potenza, Italy.

== History ==
The project for the construction of the new courthouse in Potenza was entrusted to architect Amerigo Lapenna and engineers Luciano Petracca and Franco De Pascali. It was drafted starting in 1972.

The courthouse was completed in 1990. Since then, it has housed all the judicial offices of Potenza, including the civil and criminal courts, the Public Prosecutor's Office, and the Court of Appeal.

== Description ==
The building is an imposing reinforced concrete structure, measuring 130 meters in length and 90 meters in width. It is developed over three underground floors and six above ground. The volumes are arranged around four internal courtyards and a wide covered square. The facades are characterized by large overhangs and wide ribbon windows with brise soleil.

== Sources ==
- Giambersio, Valerio (1995). Guida all'architettura del Novecento a Potenza. Melfi: Librìa. pp. 130–131.
- Villani, Franco; Fulco, Rosario (2018). Potenza città verticale. Guida turistica. Potenza: Villani Editore.
