= Pescara Courthouse =

Judiciary building in Pescara, Italy

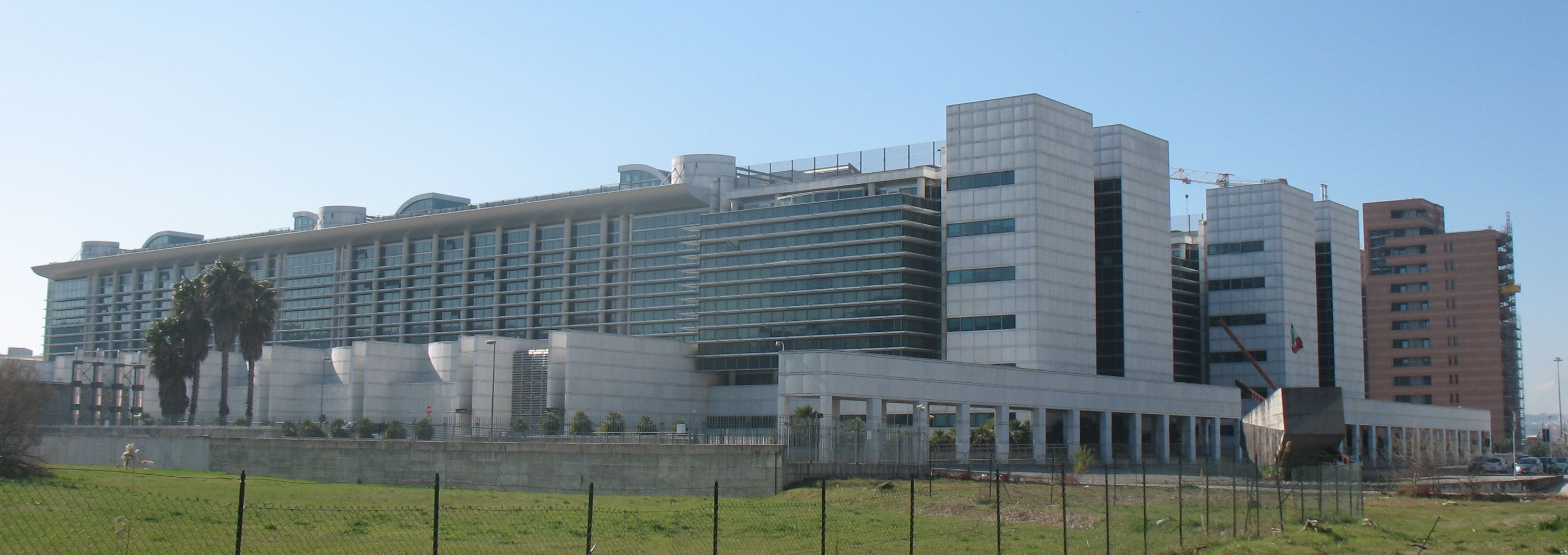
- Interactive map of the Pescara Courthouse area

General information
- Type: Courthouse
- Location: Pescara, Abruzzo, Italy
- Coordinates: 42°26′58.7″N 14°13′18.1″E
- Construction started: 1992
- Completed: 2004
- Opening: 13 July 2004; 21 years ago

Design and construction
- Architects: Franco Agresta, Giulio Fioravanti
- Structural engineer: Massimo Calda

The Pescara Courthouse (Italian: Palazzo di Giustizia di Pescara, lit. 'Palace of Justice of Pescara') is a judicial complex located on Via Antonio Lo Feudo in Pescara, Italy.

== History ==
The new courthouse was designed to bring together all the city's judicial offices, whose headquarters was previously housed in the former courthouse at Piazza Alessandrini. The site chosen was south of the city center, where the D'Annunzio University of Chieti–Pescara had already established its campus. This location positioned the new building as a significant urban landmark within a relatively new area.

The project was conceived by architects Franco Agresta and Giulio Fioravanti starting in 1992. It was inaugurated on 13 July 2004.

== Description ==
The courthouse's overall layout consists of two long structures clad in Carrara marble and glass, mirrored and separated by a wide covered central gallery, which serves as the complex's focal point. This gallery terminates at an external triangular square, featuring a lattice-like building. Here stands the fountain by Ettore Spalletti, crafted in black granite with an elliptical shape.

Other contemporary artworks enhancing the courthouse include the marble mosaic by Enzo Cucchi in the conference hall, depicting a hanging skull in a metaphysical style, and a light circle installation in the gallery by Michelangelo Pistoletto.

In the square, there is also a monument dedicated to the fallen of Nassiriya, designed by the Faculty of Architecture at the University of Pescara and authored by Giangiacomo D'Ardia.

== Sources ==
- Caterina Palestini; Carlo Pozzi, eds. (2013). L'architettura in Abruzzo e Molise dal 1945 ad oggi. Selezione delle opere di rilevante interesse storico-artistico. Rome: Gangemi. pp. 204–205.
- Pezzi, Aldo Giorgio; Cecamore, Stefano, eds. (2012). Oltre lo Sguardo. Architetture d’eccellenza del XX secolo. De Siena Editore. pp. 146–149.
- Pozzi, Carlo (2003). "Itinerari del Novevento". L'Architettura cronache e storia. No. 578. Rome: Mancosu Editore. pp. 942–943.
- Pozzi, Carlo, ed. (2006). Il Palazzo di Giustizia di Pescara. Carsa Edizioni.
