= Asti Courthouse =

Judiciary building in Asti, Italy

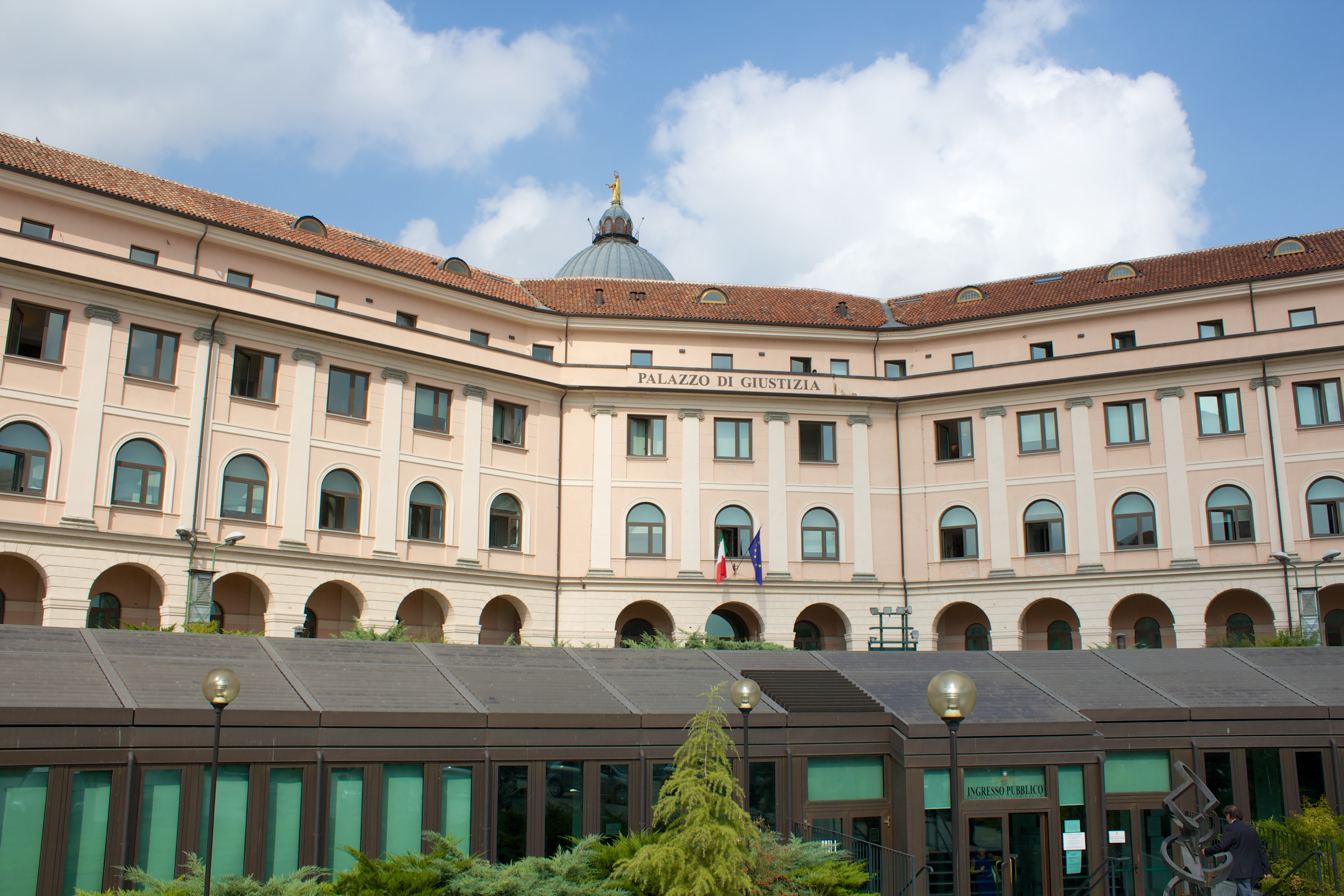
- Interactive map of the Asti Courthouse area

General information
- Location: Asti, Piedmont, Italy
- Coordinates: 44°53′46.86″N 8°11′52.90″E
- Opening: 2004 (as courthouse)

The Asti Courthouse (Italian: Palazzo di Giustizia di Asti, lit. 'Palace of Justice of Asti') is a judicial building located on Via Giuseppe Govone in Asti, Italy.

== History ==
The building that today houses the Asti Courthouse forms part of a large architectural complex located west of the former Porta San Marco, in the San Rocco district of Asti. The area was originally occupied by three religious institutions: the convents of the Carmelite Friars of the Ancient Observance, the Discalced Carmelites (under the dedication of Saint Joseph), and the Monastery of Sant'Anna. These religious buildings, founded between the 15th and 17th centuries, were suppressed in the early 19th century during the Napoleonic era.

By imperial decree in 1810, the former convents were transferred to the municipality and converted to military use, forming what became known as the Carmine Military Quarter. The complex was subsequently adapted to accommodate a large number of troops, benefiting from its porticoed buildings and internal courtyards. In 1915, the site was officially designated "Caserma Carlo Alberto", a name by which it later became widely known among the local population as the "Casermone" ("the big barracks"). The barracks hosted several military units, including Bersaglieri regiments, and continued to serve a military function until the end of World War II.

Following the withdrawal of the armed forces after 1945, the complex entered a prolonged period of abandonment and degradation. Portions of the former barracks were temporarily occupied by displaced persons and homeless families in the post-war decades, while other areas remained unused. The entire site was gradually vacated by the mid-1980s and was acquired by the Municipality of Asti in 1988.

At the end of the 20th century, the former barracks was selected for conversion into a judicial complex. This decision was taken despite the existence of a relatively recent courthouse in Piazza Catena, a modern building inaugurated on 23 December 1963 and constructed after the demolition of the church of the Annunziata Grande in 1958. The proposal to relocate the judiciary to the former "Casermone" therefore generated public debate and criticism, as a judicial seat was already in operation at the time. A major restoration and redevelopment project, designed by architects Giovanni Bo and Luciano Bosia, focused on adapting the historic structures to modern judicial needs. After more than ten years of renovation work, the building was officially transferred to the judicial administration in 2004, marking its transformation into the Asti Courthouse.

Since then, the complex has housed all the city's judicial offices, including the Ordinary Court, the Public Prosecutor's Office, the Justice of the Peace, the Judicial Officers, and the local Bar Association. A portion of the complex, however, has not yet been rehabilitated; despite several redevelopment proposals advanced over the years, this wing of the former barracks remains in a state of abandonment.
