= Palazzo Galli Tassi, Lucca =

Building in Lucca, Italy

Palazzo Galli Tassi
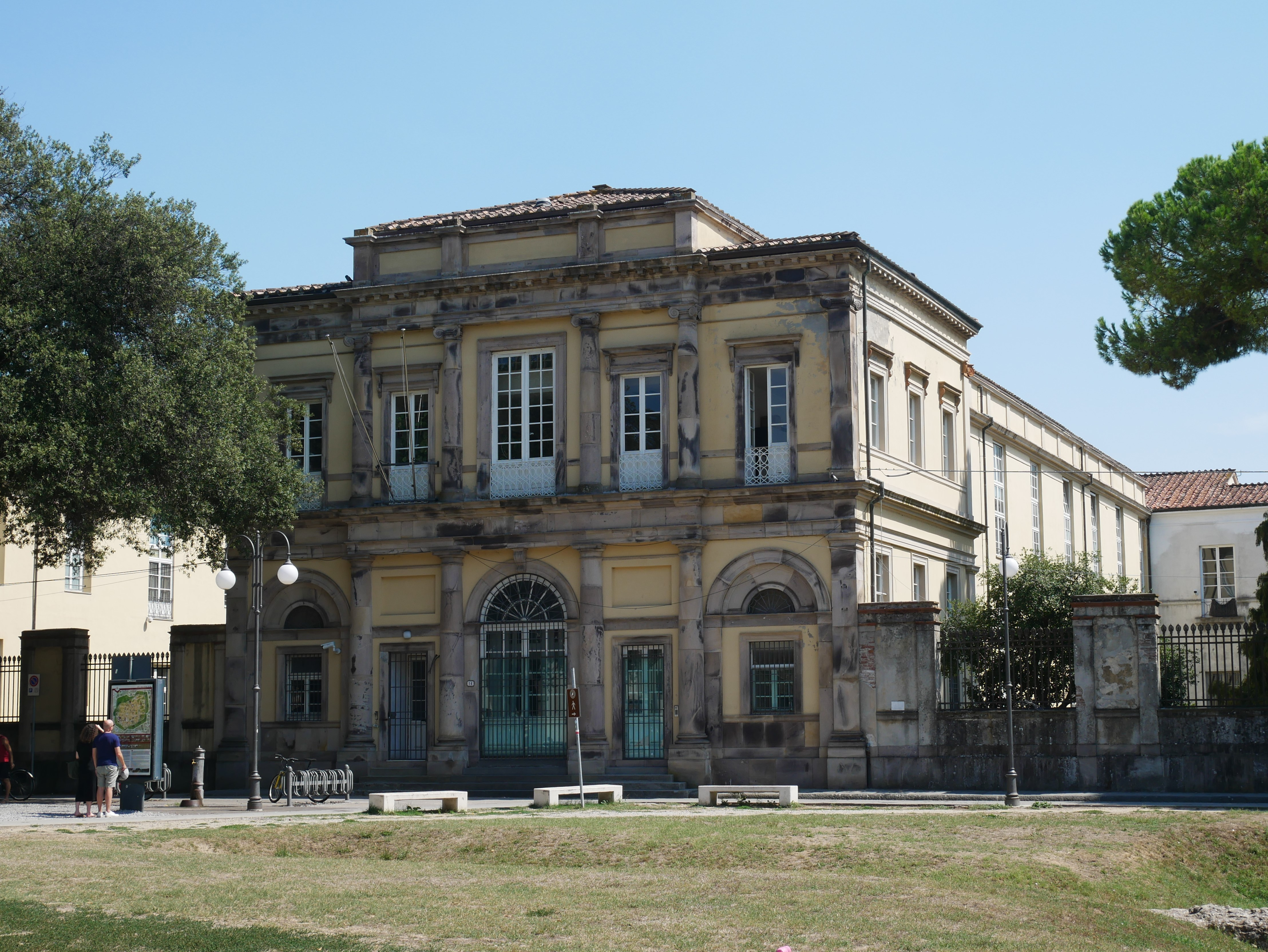
- The façade of one of the rear wings facing Piazzale San Donato.
- Interactive map of the Palazzo Galli Tassi area

General information
- Location: Lucca, Tuscany, Italy
- Coordinates: 43°50′39.7″N 10°29′56.1″E
- Construction started: 1262
- Renovated: 1870

The Palazzo Galli Tassi is an architectural complex located in the historic centre of Lucca, Italy. It serves primarily as the city's courthouse, while two lateral wings on Piazzale San Donato are occupied by municipal offices.

Its main entrance, on Via Galli Tassi, leads into a central building that opens onto a wide internal courtyard, which functions as the organizational core of the entire site. From this structure, four long wings extend toward the back of the property. Together, these interconnected structures form a pavilion-style layout.

== History ==
Originally established as a charitable institution under the name Hospital of San Luca, it was founded at the initiative of the Merchants' Guild, with the first documented act being an authorization for its construction issued by Bishop Enrico in 1262.

In the following centuries, additional buildings used as hospices were incorporated into the complex, including the church and monastery of Santa Giustina. The hospital was managed by the Merchants' Guild until the guild was dissolved in 1807.

The current structure of the hospital dates to 1870, when earlier constructions were demolished and major structural changes were made. The name Galli Tassi was adopted after Antonio Galli Tassi, the last heir of the noble family, who died without descendants in 1876 and bequeathed his adjacent properties to the hospital.

Following the construction of the new Campo di Marte hospital in 1935, the complex continued operating only as an orthopedics ward until around 1980, when it was repurposed as a judicial complex.

On the grounds of the palace, the Tuscan Superintendency for Archaeological Heritage conducted two excavation campaigns (1990–91 and 2001–04) under the direction of archaeologist Giulio Ciampoltrini. These investigations revealed significant evidence related to the former church and monastery of Santa Giustina, a section of the Roman city walls beneath the building, and the transformation of the surrounding urban area between the 2nd century BCE and the late Middle Ages.

== Sources ==
- Castillo, Juan Antonio Quirós (2001). Modi di costruire a Lucca nell'altomedioevo. Una lettura attraverso l'archeologia dell'architettura. Florence: All'Insegna del Giglio. ISBN 978-88-7814-289-3.
