= Caltanissetta Courthouse =

Judiciary building in Caltanissetta, Italy

Coordinates: 37.4944°N 14.0468°E

- Palazzo di Giustizia di Caltanissetta
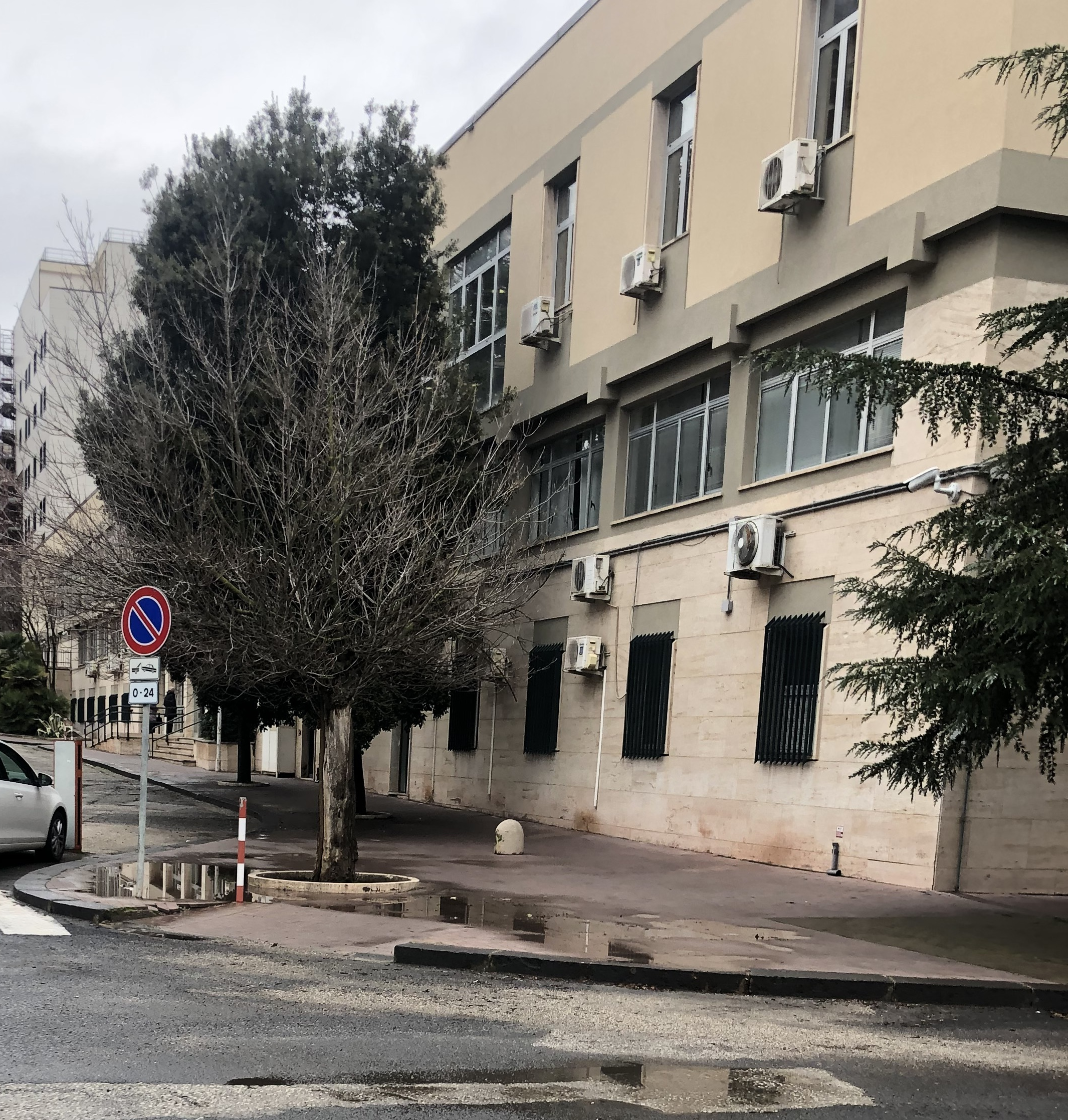
- Interactive map of the Caltanissetta Courthouse area

General information
- Type: Courthouse
- Location: Via Libertà 5 Caltanissetta, Sicily, Italy

Design and construction
- Engineer: Franco Bennardo

The Caltanissetta Courthouse (Italian: Palazzo di Giustizia di Caltanissetta) is a judicial building in Caltanissetta, Sicily, Italy. It houses several judicial offices, including the Court of Appeal and the local court and prosecution offices.

== History ==
Judicial institutions have been present in Caltanissetta since 1819, when the city became the seat of a civil tribunal and a criminal court under the Bourbon administration. During the 19th and 20th centuries the courts operated in several different buildings in the city, including Villa Mazzone and Palazzo Moncada-Bauffremont.

The new courthouse building on Via Libertà was designed by the engineer Franco Bennardo and built in the late 1960s.

In 1999, an expansion of the complex was begun, but construction was halted in 2016 before completion. The expansion of the original building required the demolition of the Villa Lo Monaco, a residential building dating from the Fascist period. As of 2026 the enlargement of the courthouse remains unfinished.
