= Rovereto Courthouse =

Judiciary building in Rovereto, Italy

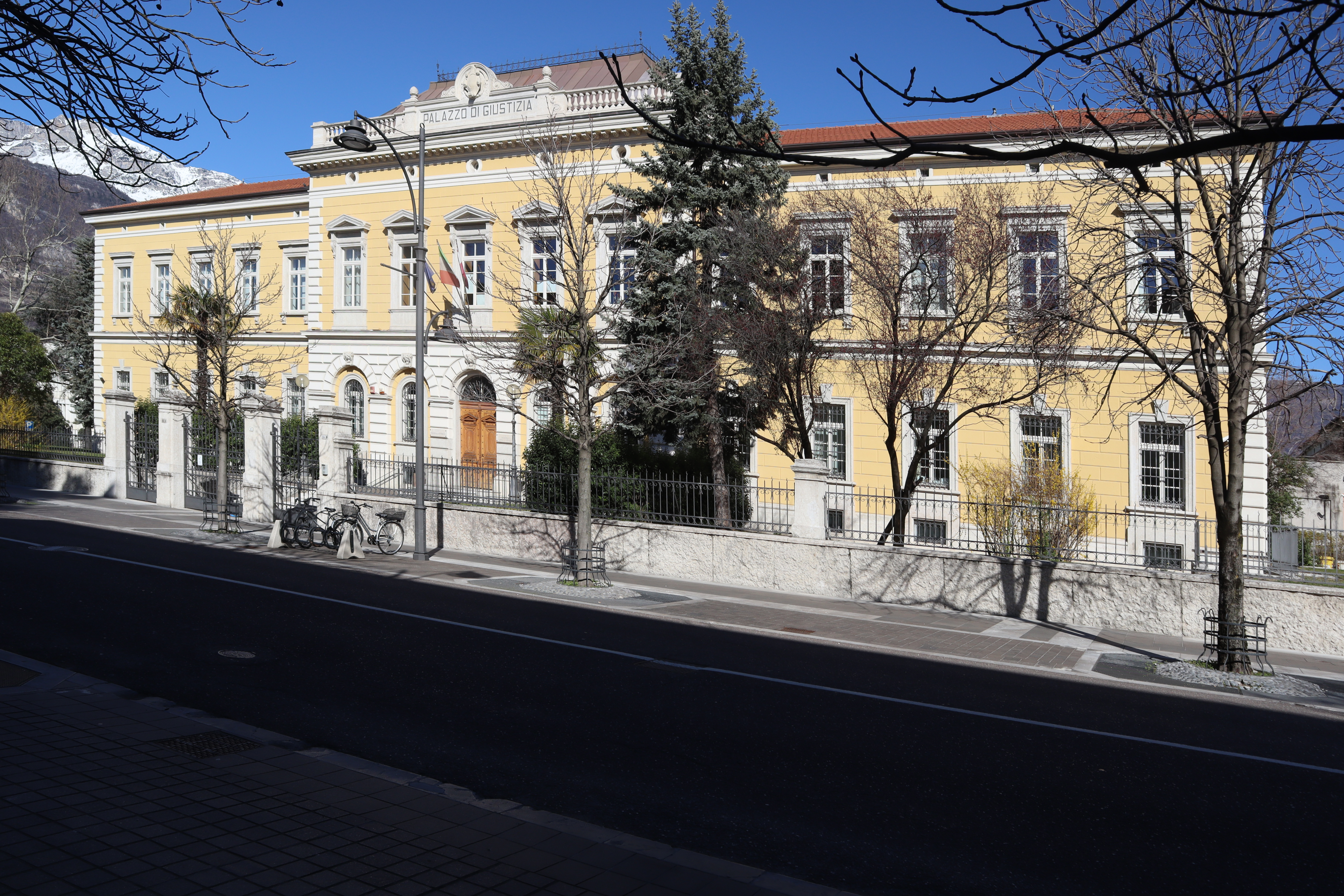
- Interactive map of the Rovereto Courthouse area

General information
- Location: Rovereto, Trentino, Italy
- Coordinates: 45°53′28.5″N 11°02′10.1″E
- Completed: 1913

The Rovereto Courthouse (Palazzo di Giustizia) is a building located on Corso Antonio Rosmini in Rovereto, Italy. It houses the local court and is one of the city's most significant examples of late-Austro-Hungarian civic architecture.

== History ==
The courthouse was inaugurated in 1913, during the final years of the Austro-Hungarian Empire, in the presence of emperor Franz Joseph. A Latin plaque still displayed in the entrance hall commemorates this event.

The construction of the building reflected the broader imperial policy of providing major administrative centers with representative judicial headquarters. The Rovereto courthouse, in particular, was designed to express authority, balance, and civic dignity, consistent with the architectural language of Austrian institutional buildings of the period.

After World War I and the annexation of Trentino to Italy in 1918, the courthouse continued to serve its original judicial function, becoming the seat of the Court of Rovereto under the new Italian judicial system. Over the course of the 20th century, the building underwent several renovations and restorations to adapt it to modern requirements while preserving its historical and architectural character.
