= Biella Courthouse =

Judiciary building in Biella, Italy

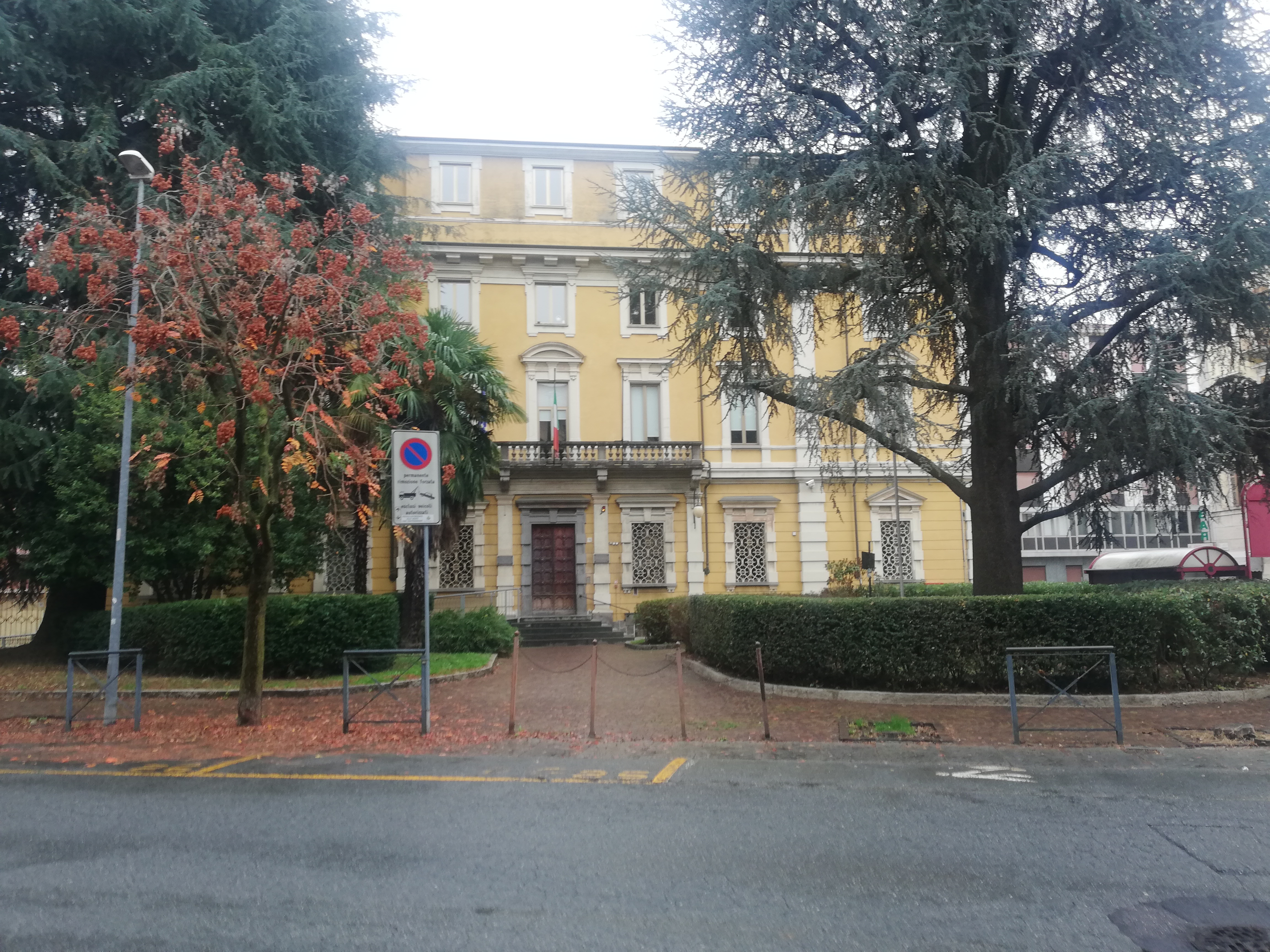
- Interactive map of the Biella Courthouse area

General information
- Type: Courthouse
- Location: Biella, Piedmont, Italy
- Coordinates: 45°34′2.35″N 8°3′28.4″E
- Construction started: 1901
- Completed: 1903
- Opening: 15 October 1903; 122 years ago

Design and construction
- Engineer: Giovanni Ferroggio

The Biella Courthouse (Italian: Palazzo di Giustizia di Biella, lit. 'Palace of Justice of Biella') is a judicial building located on Via Guglielmo Marconi in Biella, Italy.

== History ==
Following the restoration of Savoy rule, a network of lower courts and justices of the peace was created by royal decrees between 1814 and 1818, while a Tribunal of the Prefecture was instituted in Biella in 1823 as part of broader judicial reforms introduced under the regency of Charles Felix. Over the course of the 19th century, successive reorganizations led to the suppression or consolidation of several minor courts, gradually centralizing judicial activity in Biella and creating the institutional conditions for the construction of a dedicated courthouse at the beginning of the 20th century.

Discussions within the Biella City Council regarding the construction of a purpose-built courthouse began in March 1901. Several proposals were examined before the council decided to acquire a plot of land from the Administration of the Hospital of the Infirm, located between what was then Via Vittorio Emanuele (now Via della Repubblica) and Via dell'Ospedale (now Via Marconi). The purchase was formally approved by the municipal council on 3 June 1901, during the mayoralty of Corradino Sella.

The project was drafted by the municipal engineer Giovanni Feroggio. Construction works lasted approximately two years, and the new courthouse was officially inaugurated on 15 October 1903.
