= Palazzo Torres =

Palace in Trani, Italy

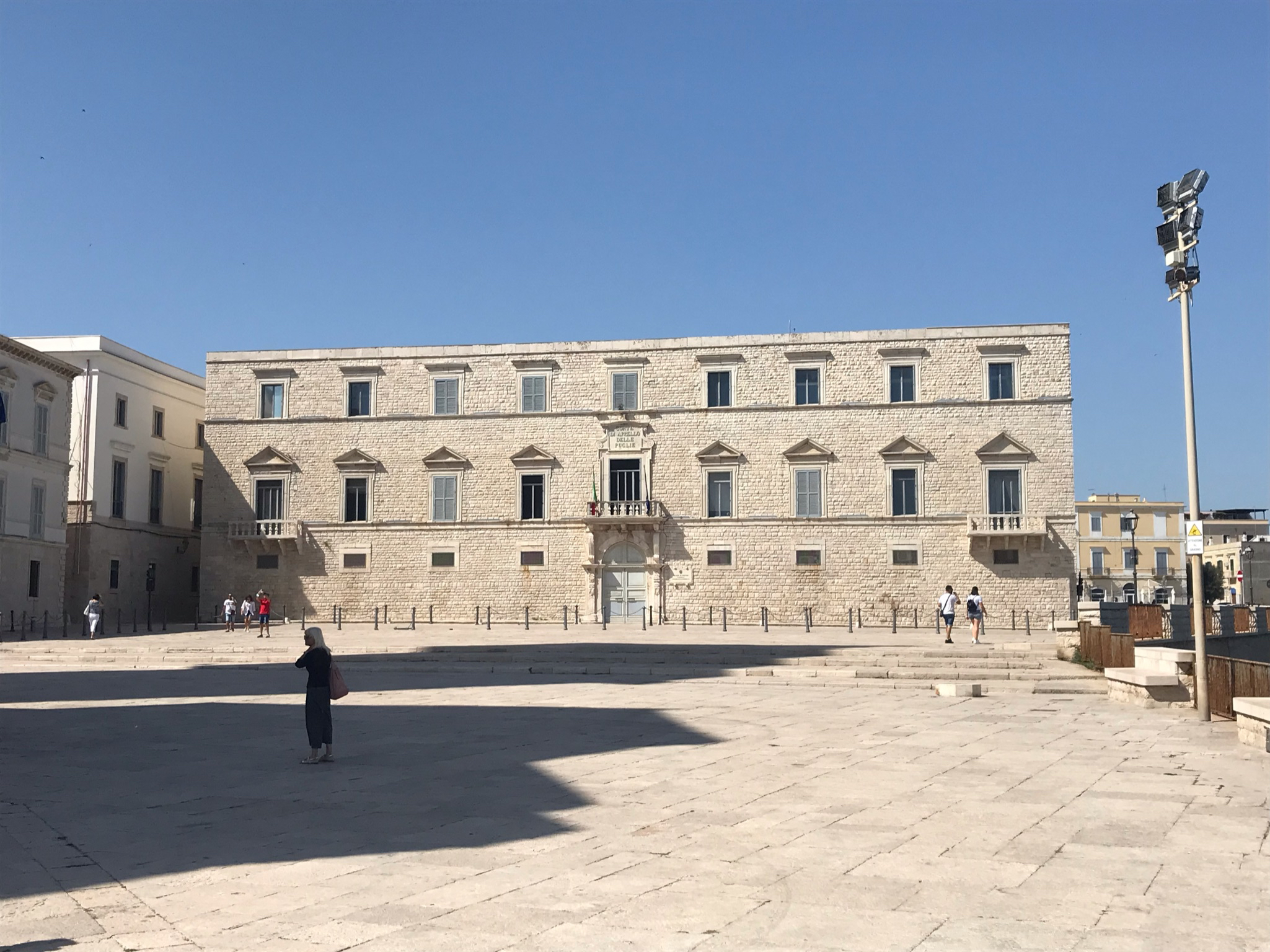
- Interactive map of the Palazzo Torres area

General information
- Location: Trani, Apulia, Italy
- Coordinates: 41°16′54.3″N 16°25′02.5″E
- Completed: 16th century

Palazzo Torres is a 16th-century palace located on Piazza Duomo in Trani, Italy. It houses the Trani Court, including the criminal court, the Assize court, and the prosecutor's office. The civil court is instead located in a different building, Palazzo Candido, in Piazza Cesare Battisti.

== History ==
Built in the first half of the 16th century at the request of Martino Torres, a member of a Tranese family of Spanish origin. The building later hosted the city's first permanent theater in the early 19th century.

In 1811, the Municipality authorized the government to use the palace for judicial purposes, accommodating the highest judicial authority of the Terra di Bari. From 1861 to 1923, it served as the Court of Appeal for Apulia.

Currently, Palazzo Torres houses the main offices of the Court of Trani.

== Description ==
The building is located in Trani's main square, between the cathedral and the castle. The façade of the building, made entirely of stone, is divided horizontally by cornices, featuring tabernacle windows, the main portal, and three balconies.

On the first floor are located the presidency of the Court, as well as the criminal court and the magistrate's offices, along with the Assizes court and its respective courtrooms. The second floor is home to the local public prosecutor's office.
