= Benevento Courthouse =

Judiciary building in Benevento, Italy

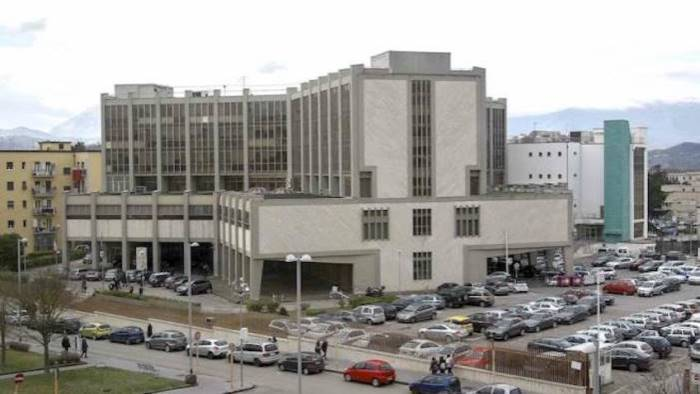
- Interactive map of the Benevento Courthouse area

General information
- Type: Courthouse
- Location: Benevento, Campania, Italy
- Coordinates: 41°7′45.3″N 14°47′13.5″E
- Completed: 1982
- Inaugurated: 29 May 1983; 42 years ago
- Cost: 7 billion lire

Design and construction
- Architect: Leopoldo Principe
- Structural engineer: Gennaro De Rienzo

The Benevento Courthouse (Italian: Palazzo di Giustizia di Benevento, lit. 'Palace of Justice of Benevento') is a judicial complex located on Via Raffaele De Caro in Benevento, Italy.

== History ==
Since its establishment in 1865, the Court of Benevento was housed in the former Dominican convent located in the central Piazza Guerrazzi. Following the damage caused by the 1980 earthquake, judicial offices were relocated to temporary sites, such as the Palazzo Dell'Aquila-Bosco Lucarelli on Corso Garibaldi and a building on Via Ruffilli.

Meanwhile, the process of designing a new courthouse in a decentralized area began, involving conflicts between the municipal administration and the public prosecutor Giuseppe Faraone. The project was entrusted to architect Leopoldo Principe, with Gennaro De Rienzo responsible for structural engineering. The urgency created by the 1980 seismic event led to an accelerated construction schedule, and the new building was completed in 1982 at a cost of 7 billion lire. The official inauguration took place on 29 May 1983, with the presence of Undersecretary of Justice Giuseppe Gargani.

Following the merger of the Court of Ariano Irpino in 2013, additional space was required. A new wing was constructed to accommodate the Prosecutor's Office, while the Labor section was transferred to the former Guidoni barracks on Viale Atlantici.

== Sources ==
- Pugliese Carratelli, Giovanni (1996). Storia e civiltà della Campania: Il Novecento. Naples: Electa. p. 146. ISBN 978-88-435-3719-8.
- Zampelli, Domenico (2014). "I palazzi di giustizia a Benevento".
