= Isernia Courthouse =

Judiciary building in Isernia, Italy

- Interactive map of the Isernia Courthouse area

General information
- Type: Courthouse
- Location: Isernia, Molise, Italy
- Coordinates: 41°35′37.2″N 14°13′53.6″E
- Construction started: 1970

Design and construction
- Architect: Edgardo Coppola

The Isernia Courthouse (Palazzo di Giustizia) is a judicial complex located on Piazza Tullio Tedeschi in Isernia, Italy. It houses the civil and criminal sections of the Court of Isernia, the Justice of the Peace, the judiciary offices, and the Prosecutor's office.

== History ==
The design for the new courthouse of Isernia was drafted by the architect Edgardo Coppola in 1970.

== Description ==
The building is distinguished by its broad concave façade, a prominent compositional feature that creates a scenographic opening toward the public space in front. The site, characterized by a slight slope, is resolved through the introduction of a basal portico that both regularizes the building's ground level and serves as a mediating element between the street and the upper volumes.

Access to the portico is provided by two lateral staircases, set back from the main elevation and screened by a masonry parapet. The parapet incorporates a sculptural decorative scheme, imparting a distinctive character to the lower portion of the structure. The stonework of this element establishes a coherent material and formal dialogue with the portico's pillars, which are arranged in a regular transverse rhythm that accentuates the depth and cadence of the architectural composition. The sculptural panel on the façade is the work of the artist Tonino Petrocelli.

The main façade, marked by the curvilinear profile of the building, is further articulated by the alternating sequence of pillars and narrow vertical openings. This configuration not only emphasizes the concave form of the structure but also generates a dynamic interplay of solid and void that helps mitigate the mass of the elevation. According to critics, the resulting composition achieves a balanced effect, combining institutional monumentality with structural clarity.

== Sources ==
- Massimo Bignardi, ed. (1997). Contemporanea. Appunti per una storia delle arti visive nel Molise dal 1945 al 1992. Venafro: Vitmar. pp. 158–188.
- Caterina Palestini; Carlo Pozzi, eds. (2013). L'architettura in Abruzzo e Molise dal 1945 ad oggi. Selezione delle opere di rilevante interesse storico-artistico. Rome: Gangemi. pp. 254–255.
