= Aosta Courthouse =

Judiciary building in Aosta, Italy

- Interactive map of the Aosta Courthouse area

General information
- Location: Aosta, Aosta Valley, Italy
- Coordinates: 45°44′9.6″N 7°19′20.4″E
- Construction started: 1931
- Completed: 1932
- Inaugurated: 28 October 1932; 93 years ago

Design and construction
- Engineer: Umberto Rossi

The Aosta Courthouse (Palazzo di Giustizia) is a judicial complex located on Via César Ollietti in Aosta, Italy. In addition to the offices of the Court, the building also houses the Public Prosecutor's Office and the Secretariat of the Bar Association.

== History ==
Construction of the building began in 1931 and was completed the following year. The project was commissioned by the Municipality of Aosta and assigned to the municipal engineer Umberto Rossi, who worked in collaboration with surveyor Ferruccio Vogliano. The inauguration took place on 28 October 1932, the anniversary of the March on Rome.

Until 1963, the building housed the chamber and offices of the Regional Council of Aosta Valley. The structure was raised by an additional floor during the 1980s.

On 9 December 2022, the courthouse was dedicated to Giovanni Selis, former magistrate of Aosta and the victim of the first car bombing targeting a member of the judiciary in Italy.

== Description ==
The Aosta Courthouse belongs to the eclectic tradition that characterized part of the local building production between the late-19th and early-20th centuries. The structure incorporates several formal elements typical of Valdostan eclecticism and displays, albeit in a tempered form, influences of Art Nouveau, which appear more coherently and maturely expressed in other buildings of the city, such as the former Provincial Palace or the Bank of Italy building.

This stylistic choice sets the courthouse apart from contemporary public architecture, which tended to adhere more strictly to the principles of Rationalism and to an essential form of monumentality. Nearby examples include the Post Office building and the former Fascist House (Casa del Fascio) in Piazza della Repubblica. Unlike these constructions—marked by rigorous geometries and a stricter control of spatial and volumetric composition—the courthouse adopts a freer architectural language, reflecting a sensibility still tied to historicist and decorative traditions.
