= Palazzo Cacciapiatti Fossati =

Building in Novara, Italy

- Interactive map of the Palazzo Cacciapiatti Fossati area

General information
- Location: Novara, Piedmont, Italy
- Coordinates: 45°26′46.1″N 8°37′36.4″E
- Construction started: 1670
- Completed: 1674

The Palazzo Cacciapiatti Fossati is an architectural complex located in the historic centre of Novara, Italy. It serves as the city's courthouse.

== History ==
The palace was commissioned by Luigi Cacciapiatti and built between 1670 and 1674. The construction and later enlargement of the palace reflect the prominence of the Cacciapiatti family, particularly under Giacomo Francesco Cacciapiatti, who undertook major decorative interventions after being appointed marquis in 1721.

Over the centuries, the palace hosted several notable figures, including Victor Amadeus III and Maria Antonietta of Bourbon in 1789, general Alexander Suvorov, and Napoleon, whose general Louis-Alexandre Berthier established a temporary headquarters there in 1800. In 1828, King Charles Felix and Queen Maria Cristina of Sicily visited the palace.

After passing from the Cacciapiatti family to the Fossati family, which owned the palace throughout the 19th century, the building was acquired by the Municipality of Novara in 1924. During World War II, it was used as the Militär Kommandatur under German occupation and later briefly housed the provincial command of the Guardia di Finanza. Since 2003, following extensive restoration works, the palace has served as the Novara Courthouse, complementing the nearby former convent of Sant'Agnese, which hosts the Prosecutor's Office.

== Description ==
The palace exhibits a late Baroque style marked by elegance and restrained decoration. It has a U-shaped plan, with three wings arranged around a central courtyard. Its plastered façade features 18th-century stuccoes around windows and balconies, while the ironwork of the 13 upper-floor balconies, the main piano nobile balcony, and the internal gates are particularly noteworthy.

At the center of the building lies a large courtyard, originally for carriage access, surrounded on three sides by a granite-columned portico. Above, a similar order of double columns connects the palace's wings, added in the 20th century, which replaced the original garden.

The interiors are richly decorated with frescoes reflecting the pastoral themes of the Arcadian literary movement, including mythological scenes on the ceilings and walls. Some of the decorative cycles are attributed to Francesco Maria Bianchi (1687–1733), while the main hall of honour is documented as having involved Pietro Gilardi (1677–1733).
