= Monza Courthouse =

Judiciary building in Monza, Italy

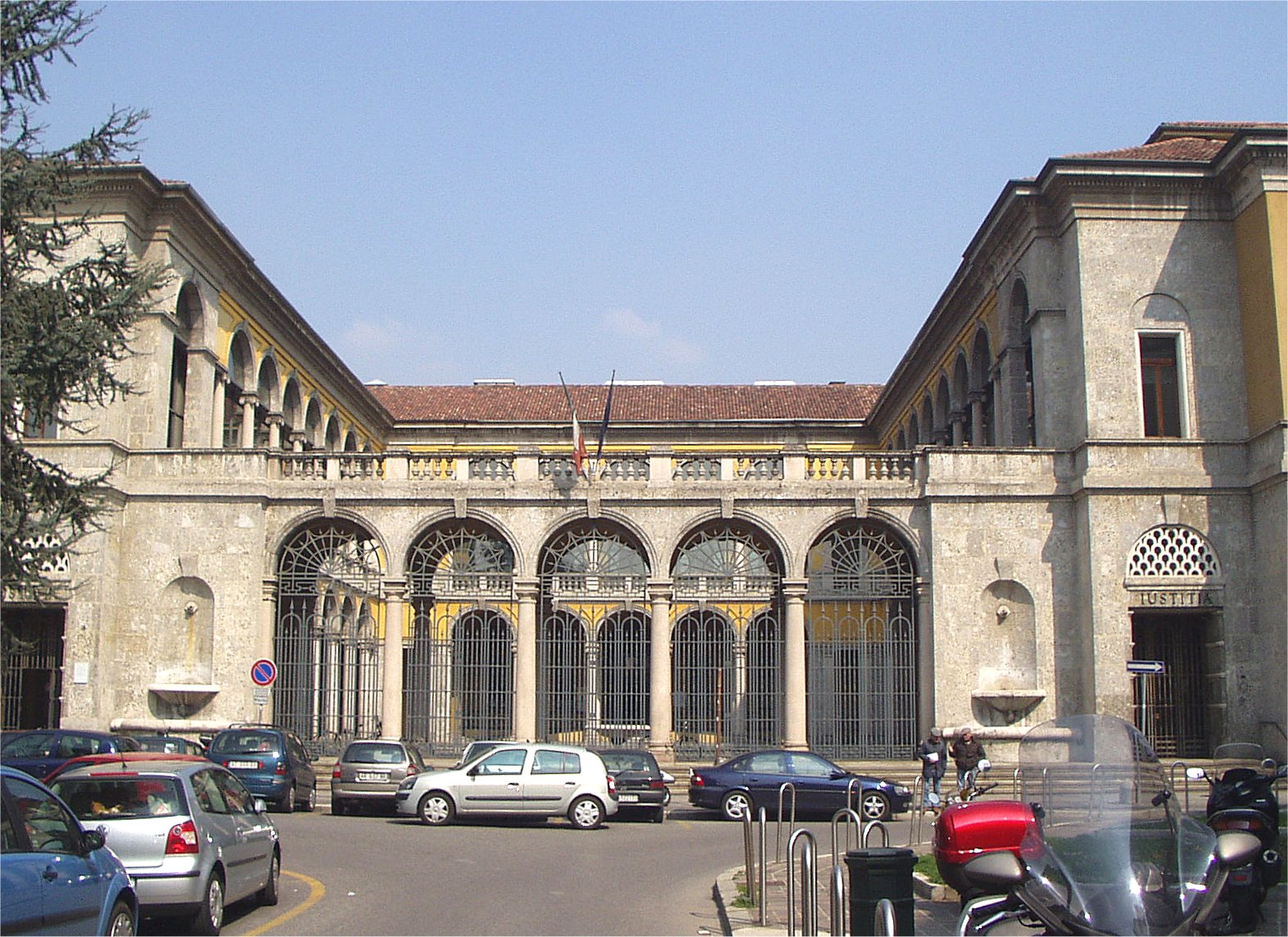
- Interactive map of the Monza Courthouse area

General information
- Location: Monza, Lombardy, Italy
- Coordinates: 45°35′7.81″N 9°16′39.29″E
- Construction started: 1933
- Completed: 1934

Design and construction
- Architect: Luigi Bartesaghi

The Monza Courthouse (Palazzo di Giustizia) is a building located on Piazza Garibaldi in Monza, Italy.

== History ==
The site originally housed the Monza Seminary, founded in the 17th century at the initiative of Charles Borromeo. The building underwent significant modifications and expansion in 1757. In 1786, following the ecclesiastical reforms of Emperor Joseph II, the seminary was closed and relocated to the former convent of San Francesco—today the Palazzo degli Studi—located in what is now Piazza Trento e Trieste.

Subsequently abandoned and owned by the Durini family, the property was acquired in 1809 by the Congregazione della Carità to house the San Gerardo Hospital. In 1897, the hospital was transferred to a newly constructed facility on Via Solferino, financed in part by donations from King Umberto I.

On 13 December 1932, Monza's fascist podestà, Ulisse Cattaneo, issued a call for proposals for the construction of a new courthouse. The commission was awarded on 15 February 1933 to architect Luigi Bartesaghi. The project entailed the demolition of the former hospital and the adjacent church of the Grazie Nuove, designed by Carlo Amati. Only one wing of the original cloister—specifically, the left-hand colonnade—was preserved and integrated into the building's new granite portico, forming the main forecourt.

== Description ==
The courthouse features a U-shaped layout, with two lateral wings joined by a central colonnaded block surmounted by a balustrade and enclosed by an iron gate. The composition is completed by two wall fountains in Zandobbio marble. Architecturally, the building reflects a synthesis of classical and Renaissance elements, combining monumental solidity with refined decorative detail.

== Sources ==
- Maspero, Valeriana (2007). Storia di Monza. Vittone.
