= Ascoli Piceno Courthouse =

Judiciary building in Ascoli Piceno, Italy

- Interactive map of the Ascoli Piceno Courthouse area

General information
- Architectural style: Rationalist
- Location: Ascoli Piceno, Marche, Italy
- Coordinates: 42°51′11.43″N 13°34′24.59″E
- Construction started: 23 February 1939
- Completed: 10 December 1952
- Inaugurated: 14 November 1954; 71 years ago

Design and construction
- Architects: Giuseppe Gaspari Pellei, Emanuele Mongiovì

The Ascoli Piceno Courthouse (Palazzo di Giustizia) is a building located on Piazza Serafino Orlini in Ascoli Piceno, Italy.

== History ==
The construction of the courthouse began in 1939, although its origins date back to 1937, when Giuseppe Cobolli Gigli announced the allocation of funds for the project in the 1940–1950 state budget.

The original design, prepared by engineer Giuseppe Gaspari Pellei, was inspired by the judicial architecture developed by Marcello Piacentini and the brothers Gaetano and Ernesto Rapisardi. It was later revised—though not substantially altered—by architect Emanuele Mongiovì, who also served as construction supervisor. Work commenced on 23 February 1939, carried out by the Fortunato Borghi company of Ancona.

After completion of the first construction phase in 1940, building activities were suspended due to the war and resumed only in 1945. The project advanced again in 1952, when a grant of five million lire was allocated for furnishings. The building was officially handed over on 10 December of the same year and inaugurated on 14 November 1954 in the presence of the Minister of Justice, Michele De Pietro.

During roadworks carried out in 1956, significant archaeological finds were uncovered, including a mosaic now housed in the local Archaeological Museum. Between 1958 and 1959, the building's travertine façade was completed, giving it its present appearance.

On the occasion of the courthouse's 60th anniversary, a bust of lawyer and former mayor Serafino Orlini, created by sculptor Alfio Ortenzi, was installed inside.

== Sources ==
- Ciccarelli, Lorenzo (2016). Guida all'architettura nelle Marche 1900-2015. Macerata: Quodlibet.
- Laffi, Umberto (1975). Storia di Ascoli Piceno nell'età antica. Giardini.
- Rodilossi, Antonio (1975). Guida per Ascoli Piceno. Grafica Futura.
