= Alessandria Courthouse =

Judiciary building in Alessandria, Italy

- Interactive map of the Alessandria Courthouse area

General information
- Location: Alessandria, Piedmont, Italy
- Coordinates: 44°54′36.8″N 8°36′29.3″E
- Construction started: 1939
- Completed: 1940

Design and construction
- Architect: Francesco Sappia

The Alessandria Courthouse is a judicial building located on Corso Crimea in Alessandria, Italy. It was originally constructed in the 1930s to house the Army Corps Command, before being reassigned to judicial functions in the post-war period, serving as the seat of the Court and the Public Prosecutor's Office.

== History ==
The building was conceived in the 1930s to provide Alessandria with a unified headquarters for the Army Corps Command, previously dispersed across various rented premises in the city. Between 1931 and 1933, the municipality secured funding for the project through its own contribution and a cost-sharing agreement with the Ministry of War. After evaluating various locations, in 1938 the city selected the former provincial steam-tram site on Corso Crimea, purchasing the 3,200-m² plot from Giuseppe Borsalino and allocating further funds for construction.

In 1939, the construction contract was awarded to the firm Bastita e Sappia of Genoa, and the project designed by architect Francesco Sappia. Work began on 28 October 1939 and was completed at the end of 1940. After the war, the building was reassigned to judicial use and became the permanent seat of the Court of Alessandria.

At the beginning of the 21st century, the building became the focus of controversy due to its numerous critical issues. Besides lacking sufficient space for all offices, it was classified as "at risk of collapse" under a 2003 ordinance and does not comply with anti-seismic regulations. In 2025, its deteriorated condition once again drew public criticism, with calls for urgent restoration work.

== Description ==
The Courthouse is a large five-storey structure with a covered area of approximately 1,600 m² and more than two hundred rooms, originally intended for military offices. The treatment of materials differentiates the building's levels: the lower two floors are clad in travertine, while the upper storeys feature exposed brickwork. The main façade faces Corso Crimea and is symmetrically arranged around a monumental, tripartite entrance marked by three arched openings.

Stylistically, the building is an example of historicist interpretation within the rationalist framework, aligning with the broader Novecento architectural language. It adopts a severe, monumental, and simplified idiom intended to convey institutional solidity and hierarchical order, consistent with Fascist architecture.
