= Trento Courthouse =

Judiciary building in Trento, Italy

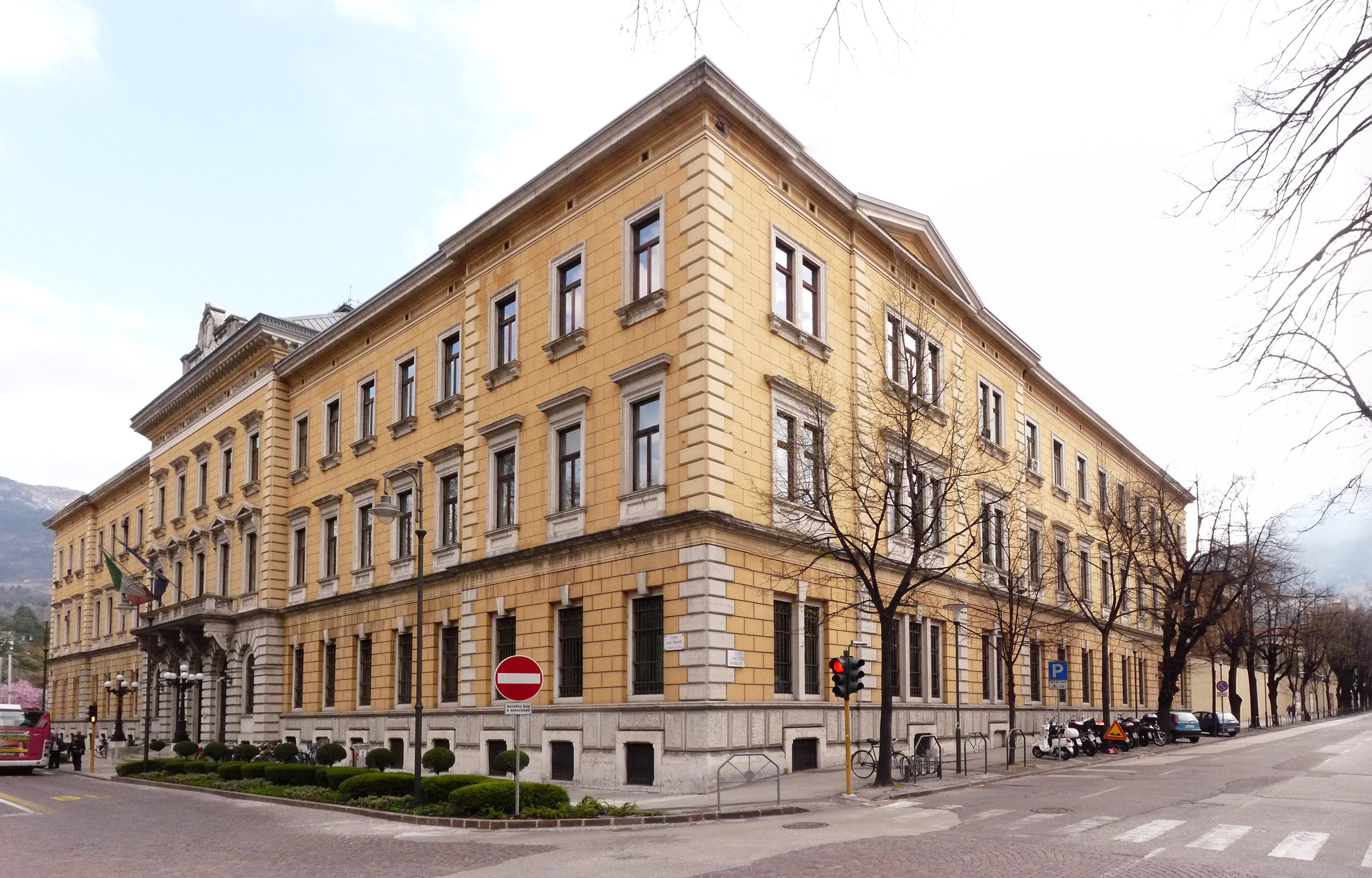
- Interactive map of the Trento Courthouse area

General information
- Location: Trento, Trentino, Italy
- Coordinates: 46°3′57.38″N 11°7′33.81″E
- Opening: 1881; 145 years ago

Design and construction
- Architect: Karl Schaden

The Trento Courthouse (Palazzo di Giustizia) is located on Largo Luigi Pigarelli, in the city center of Trento, Italy. It currently houses the Court of Appeal and the Office of the Attorney General, the Commission for Civic Uses, most of the District Court offices, and the Public Prosecutor’s Office. It is also home to the District Law Library and the Bar Association of Trento.

== History ==
The courthouse was part of a broader complex which also included the prison. It was designed in 1876 by the Austrian architect Karl Schaden, based on a preliminary plan by Ignazio Liberi.

Schaden, an imperial official, was a member of the Viennese Universalist movement, which in architecture was expressed through Neo-Gothic and Neoclassical styles. The palace was constructed as part of a series of public works built in the same period, and the courthouse-prison complex represents the largest Austro-Hungarian building erected in Trento.

The work was carried out by local craftsmen, using red Trento stone quarried from the city's own sites. The courthouse was inaugurated by emperor Franz Joseph in 1881, as recorded on the inscription displayed in the niche at the building's entrance.

Subsequent construction work partially altered the building's original balance: the addition of the second and third floors of the lateral wings (1922, designed by architect Natale Tommasi); the construction of the service blocks and elevator shaft (1955); the demolition of the original Court of Assizes structure and the erection of a new three-story building with a basement; and the interior renovation of the mezzanine and first floors, along with the refurbishment of the attic level (1999).
