= Pavia Courthouse =

Judiciary building in Pavia, Italy

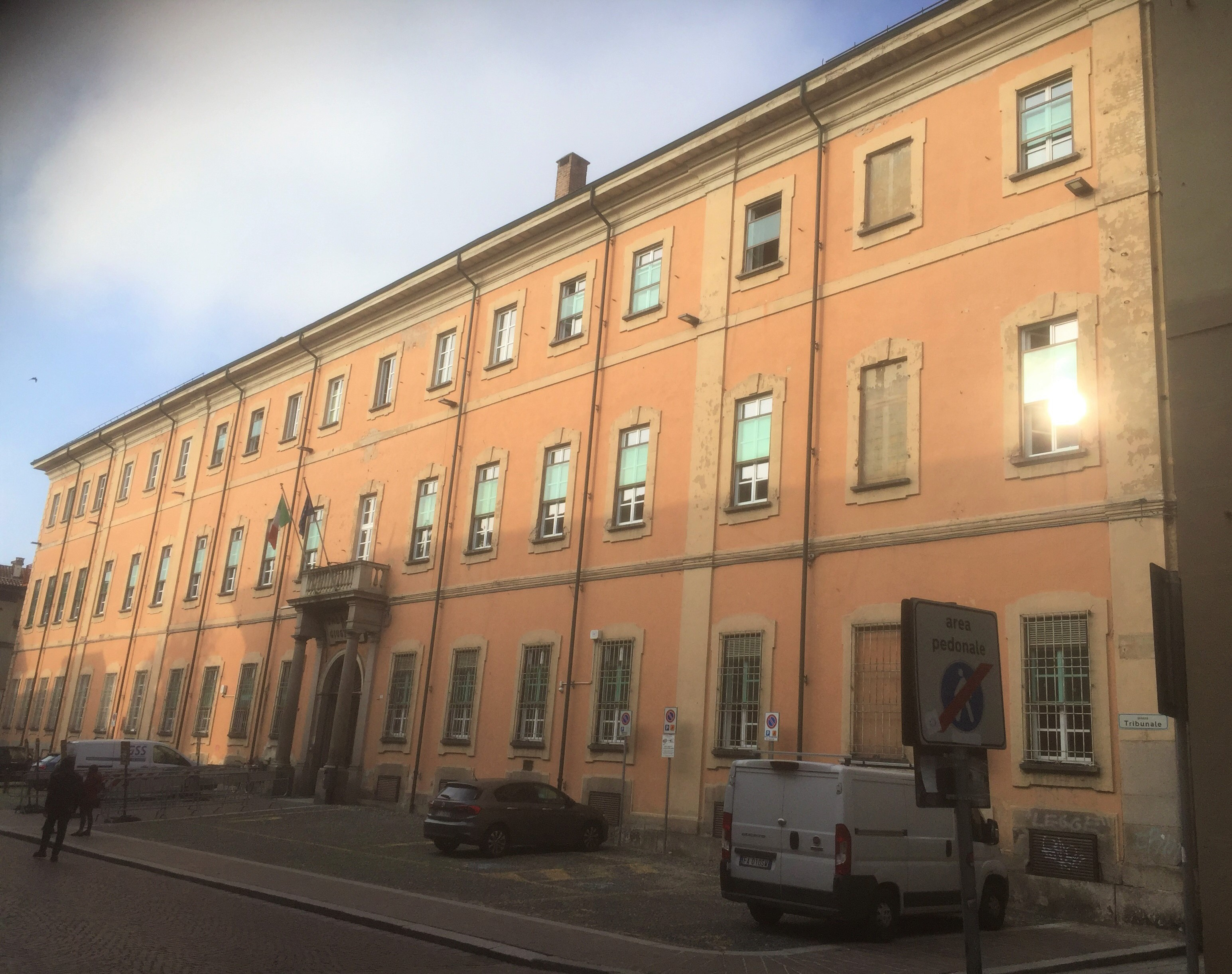
- Interactive map of the Pavia Courthouse area

General information
- Location: Pavia, Lombardy, Italy
- Coordinates: 45°11′11.7″N 9°9′2.9″E
- Construction started: 10th century
- Renovated: 1760–1767

Design and construction
- Architect: Lorenzo Cassani

The Pavia Courthouse (Palazzo di Giustizia, or Palazzo del Tribunale) is a building located on Piazza del Tribunale in Pavia, Italy.

== History ==
The building originally served as the Augustinian monastery of La Colombina, documented since at least 1140. It later passed to the Lateran Canons and, in 1513, came under the control of San Matteo Hospital. In 1539, the Somascan Fathers were granted use of the complex and established an orphanage. Thanks to donations from noblewoman Bianca Beccaria d'Adda and others, the Somascans expanded the complex, consecrating a new church in 1605 and completing the bell tower in 1612. Further renovations followed in the 17th and early 18th centuries.

In 1760, architect Lorenzo Cassani was commissioned to rebuild and expand the complex. Construction ended in 1767. After the convent's suppression in 1810, the building was repurposed to house judicial offices. By 1837, it accommodated the criminal court, civil court, public prosecutor's office, and prison facilities. Since 1914, it has served as the official courthouse for both civil and criminal proceedings.

== Description ==
The building follows a C-shaped layout. Originally, it was intended to be completed with a portico and an adjoining church, which were never built. The structure includes a grand staircase typical of 18th-century Pavia and a tower with a glazed loggia. The main façade is restrained, marked by pilasters and window frames, while the side along Via Romagnosi features exposed brickwork.

Renovations between 2005 and 2008 uncovered a large Roman domus beneath the courtyard, dating from the 1st century AD and later expanded in the 3rd–4th centuries with heated and richly decorated rooms. Some Lombard-period huts were later built atop these remains. Marble floor fragments from the site are now housed in the Civic Museums.

== Sources ==
- Zatti, Susanna (1995). "L'architettura a Pavia nel XVII e XVIII secolo". Storia di Pavia. L'età spagnola e austriaca. Vol. 4-II. Milan: Industrie Grafiche P.M.
