= Rovigo Courthouse =

Building in Rovigo, Italy

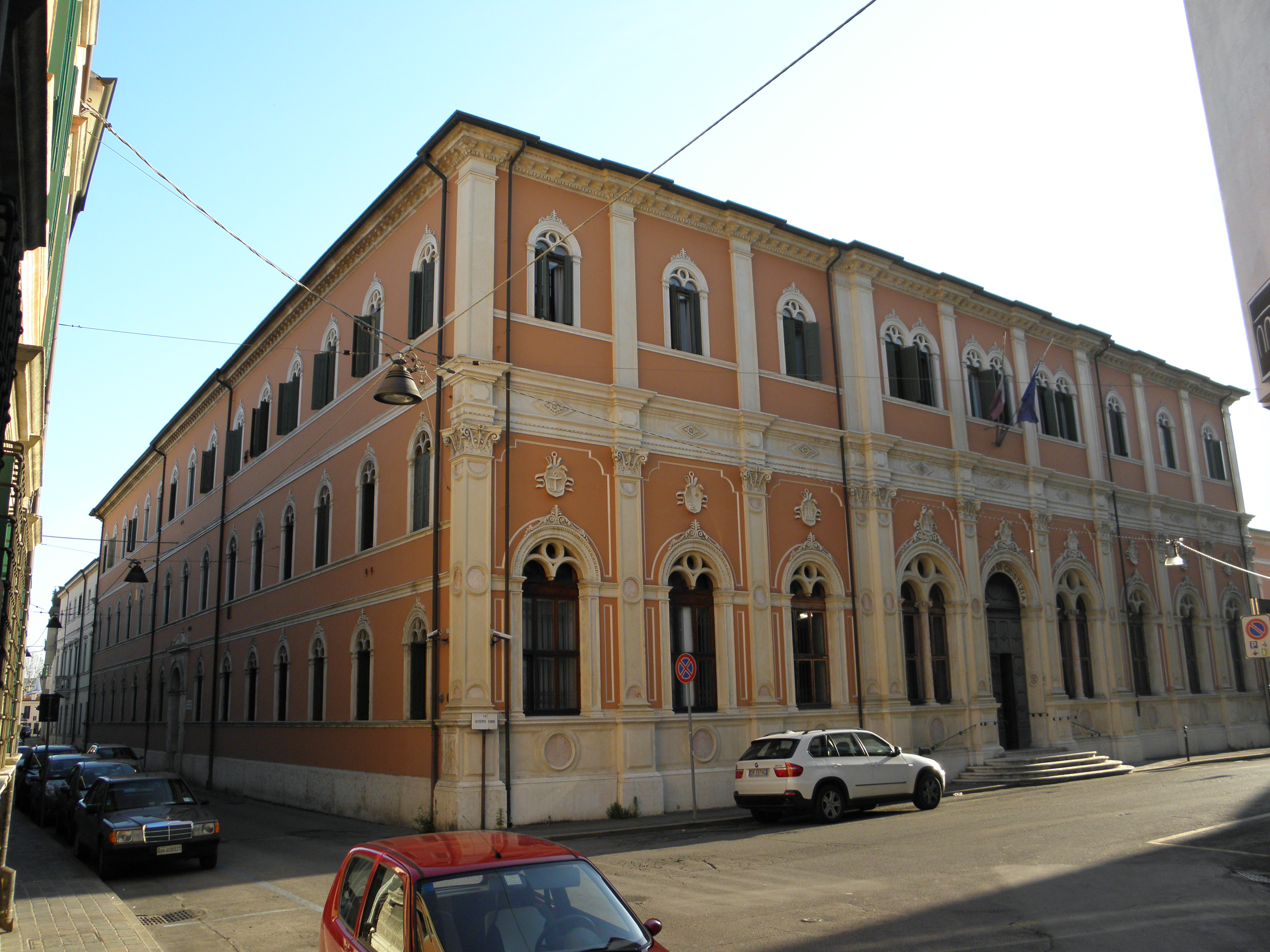
- Interactive map of the Rovigo Courthouse area

General information
- Location: Rovigo, Veneto, Italy
- Coordinates: 45°04′20.9″N 11°47′26.4″E
- Construction started: 1871
- Completed: 1873
- Inaugurated: 3 December 1873; 152 years ago

The Rovigo Courthouse is a judicial building located on Via Giuseppe Verdi in Rovigo, Italy.

== History ==
The building was constructed between 1871 and 1873 to house the court, assize court, prison, and magistrate's office, previously located in the former Palazzo Pretorio. It was built on the site of the demolished church and monastery of the Holy Trinity (Santissima Trinità), founded in 1497 by Augustinian nun Filippa De Celeri da Rovere and suppressed during the Napoleonic era, likely in 1810. Two paintings from the monastery are now in the Accademia dei Concordi's gallery.

The new courthouse was officially inaugurated on 3 December 1873. Originally a single-story structure, it was raised by one floor and renovated between the late 1950s and 1966.
