= Urbino Courthouse =

Building in Urbino, Italy

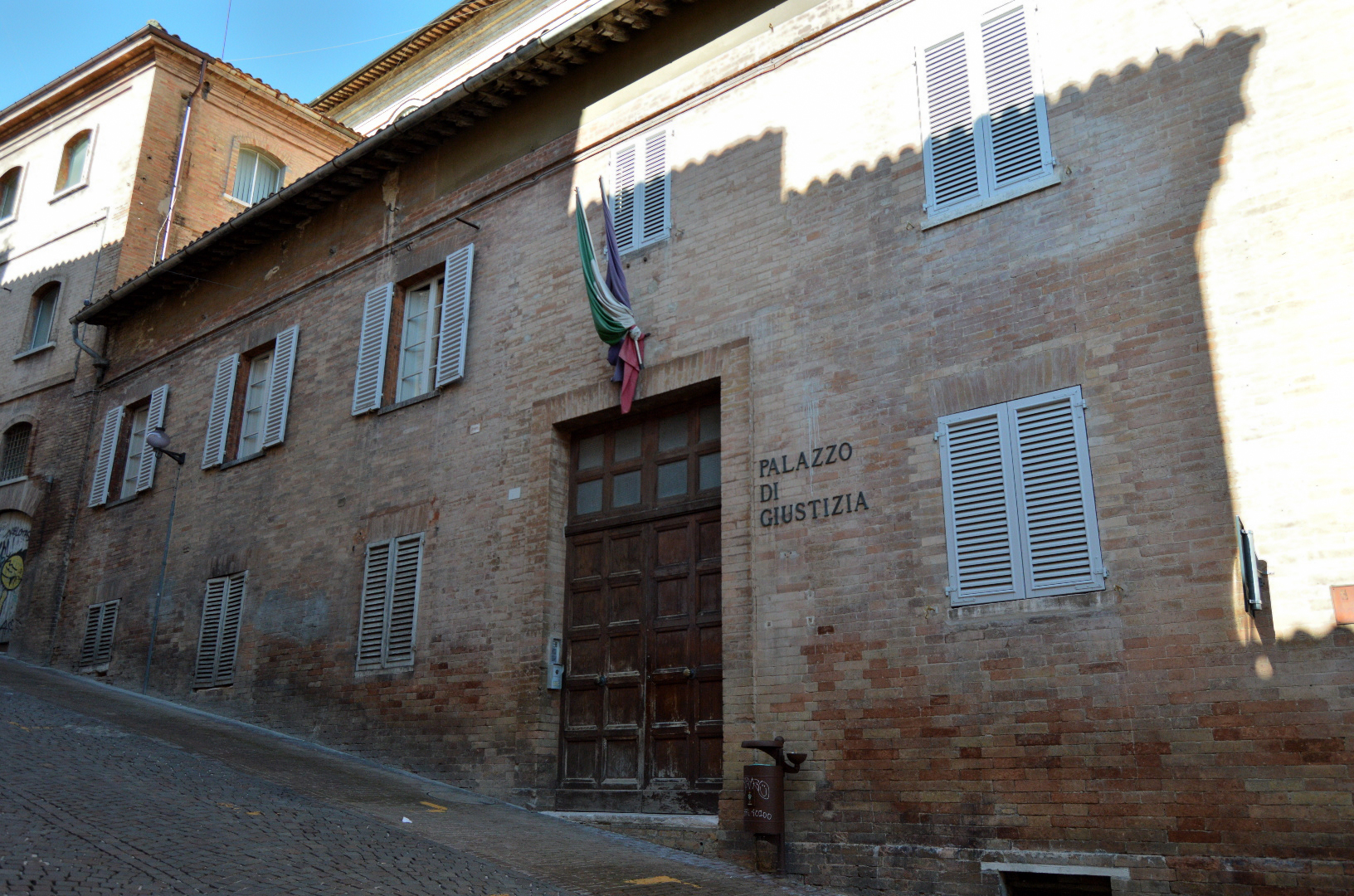
- Interactive map of the Urbino Courthouse area

General information
- Location: Urbino, Marche, Italy
- Coordinates: 43°43′39.50″N 12°38′5.83″E
- Construction started: 18th century

Design and construction
- Architect: Giuseppe Tosi

The Urbino Courthouse (Palazzo di Giustizia) is a judicial complex located in Urbino, Italy. It consists of two buildings extending between Via Raffaello, where the main entrance is located, and Via Timoteo Viti. It houses the court, judicial offices, and the public prosecutor's office of Urbino.

== History ==
The building, designed by architect Giuseppe Tosi in the late 18th century to house the girls' orphanage of the Fraternity of Santa Maria della Misericordia, was never fully completed due to lack of funds.

Over the following decades, it underwent several changes in use: it served as a reformatory, then a house of correction (1893), and finally a rehabilitation center until the late 1970s, when the Court of Urbino was relocated there from Palazzo Mauruzi Gherardi.

The complex also includes the former church of Santa Maria della Misericordia, identifiable by its Renaissance portico with three arches on Via Raffaello – the last remnant of the large hospital run by the Fraternity, which operated from the 15th century until the early 20th century.

== Sources ==
- Mazzini, Franco (2000). Urbino. I mattoni e le pietre. Urbino: Argalia. pp. 359–362.
