= Catanzaro Appellate Courthouse =

Judiciary building in Catanzaro, Italy

Catanzaro Appellate Courthouse "Salvatore Blasco"
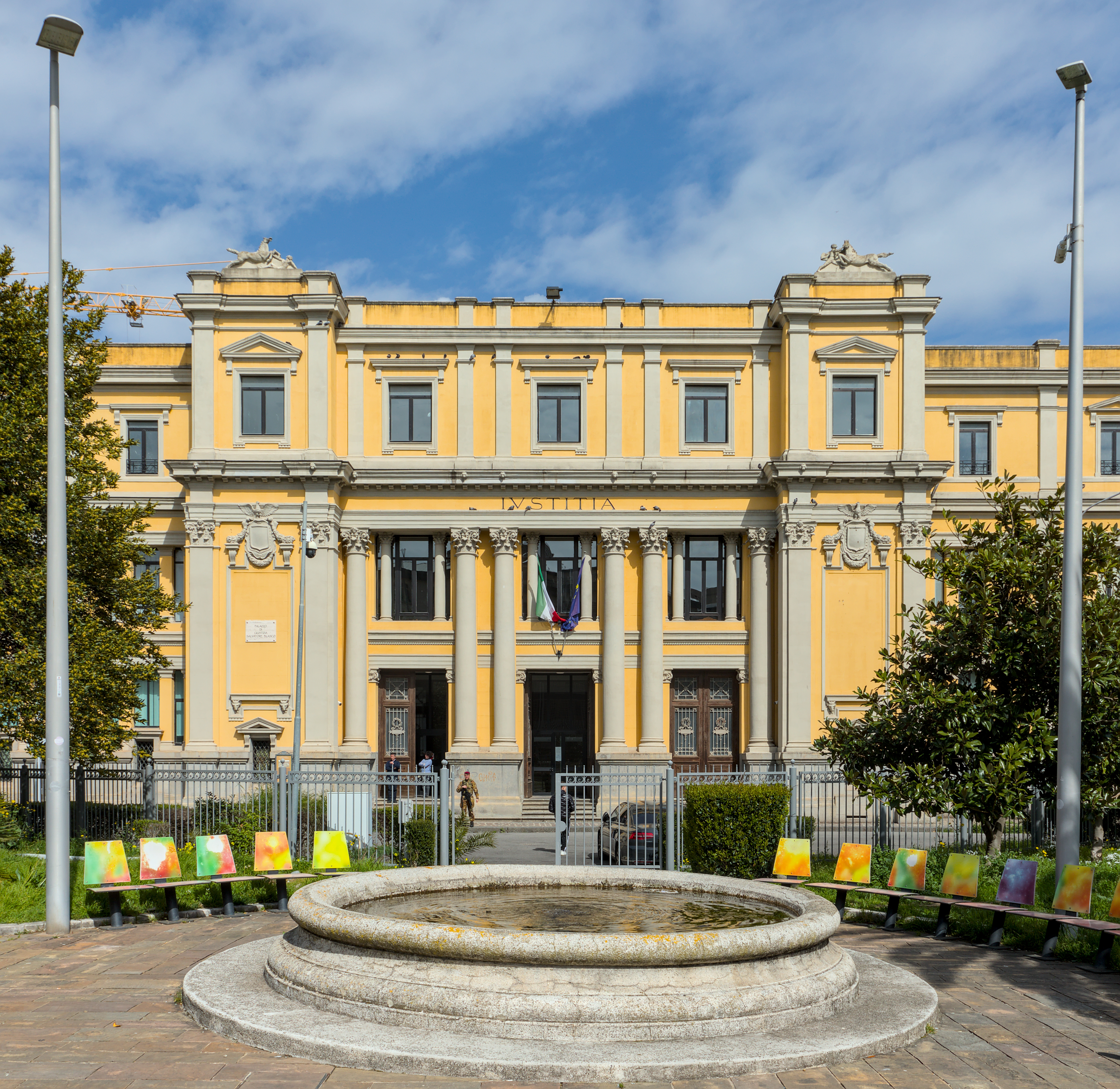
- The Catanzaro Appelate Courthouse
- Interactive map of the Catanzaro Appellate Courthouse "Salvatore Blasco" area

General information
- Type: Courthouse
- Architectural style: Stile Umbertino
- Location: Catanzaro, Calabria, Italy
- Coordinates: 38°54′40.06″N 16°35′16.10″E
- Construction started: 1916
- Inaugurated: 28 October 1930; 95 years ago

Design and construction
- Architects: Mario Gai, Cesare Palazzo

The Catanzaro Appellate Courthouse "Salvatore Blasco" is a judicial building located on Piazza Giacomo Matteotti in Catanzaro, Italy. It houses the local seat of the Court of Appeal.

== History ==
Until the early 20th century, the Court of Appeal was located in the convent of the Dominican Fathers, situated near the church of the Rosario. However, the spaces within that complex proved insufficient for the increasing functions and activities.

To accommodate the new headquarters, a larger area was chosen, which was subjected to demolition works involving some stables, nearby caves, and an old pasta factory. The project was entrusted to the engineers Mario Gai and Cesare Palazzo from Turin. The palace was built in the Umbertino style, with decorated facades.

Relocation of the offices began in 1928. The official inauguration took place on 28 October 1930.

Between 1952 and 1955, the building was elevated. It also housed the Court of Catanzaro until the early 2000s, when it was relocated to the new courthouse on Via Argento. In 2013, the palace was named after the magistrate Salvatore Blasco.
