= Ragusa Courthouse =

Judiciary building in Ragusa, Italy

- Interactive map of the Ragusa Courthouse area

General information
- Type: Courthouse
- Location: Ragusa, Sicily, Italy
- Coordinates: 36°55′26.0″N 14°43′43.7″E
- Construction started: 1965
- Completed: 1969

Design and construction
- Architects: Massimo Battaglini, Sante de Sanctis, Franco Tenca
- Structural engineer: Carmelo Poidomani, Giuseppe Spampinato

The Ragusa Courthouse (Palazzo di Giustizia) is a judicial complex located on Via Natalelli in Ragusa, Sicily, Italy.

== History ==
The courthouse of Ragusa is located near the historic Ponte Vecchio, on a sloping site bordered by Via Natalelli, Via Maiorana, and Via Dalla Chiesa. The uneven topography led to an irregular yet compact layout, composed of three juxtaposed geometric volumes, one of which is elevated on pilotis facing Via Dalla Chiesa.

The building originated from a national design competition announced in 1957 by the Municipality of Ragusa. Two entries were awarded ex-aequo: the "Sicilia" project by Massimo Battaglini, Sante de Sanctis, and Franco Tenca, and the "UNO+1" project by Gaetano and Ernesto Rapisardi. Despite the tie, the final commission was assigned in 1959 to the Battaglini–de Sanctis–Tenca team.

Although the project received quick approval and documentation was submitted promptly, construction was delayed due to expropriation issues and funding constraints. The project was revised in 1965 to improve construction efficiency and reduce costs, and the building was completed in 1969.

== Description ==
The structure features a compact, modular composition, characterized by exposed concrete honeycomb elements inspired by Le Corbusier's brise soleil, serving both functional and aesthetic purposes. The architectural language is defined by the interplay of solid concrete modules and transparent glass surfaces, creating a distinctive geometric pattern.

The main entrance on Via Natalelli is marked by a protruding travertine-clad volume, while the base of the building incorporates travertine panels and large glazed sections. Each of the three blocks maintains this material consistency while adapting to the site's topography. Minor interior modifications were made in 1990–1991 to accommodate an archive extension.

== Sources ==
- Di Benedetto, Giuseppe (2018). Antologia dell'architettura moderna in Sicilia. Palermo: 40due Edizioni.
