= L'Aquila Courthouse =

Judiciary building in L'Aquila, Italy

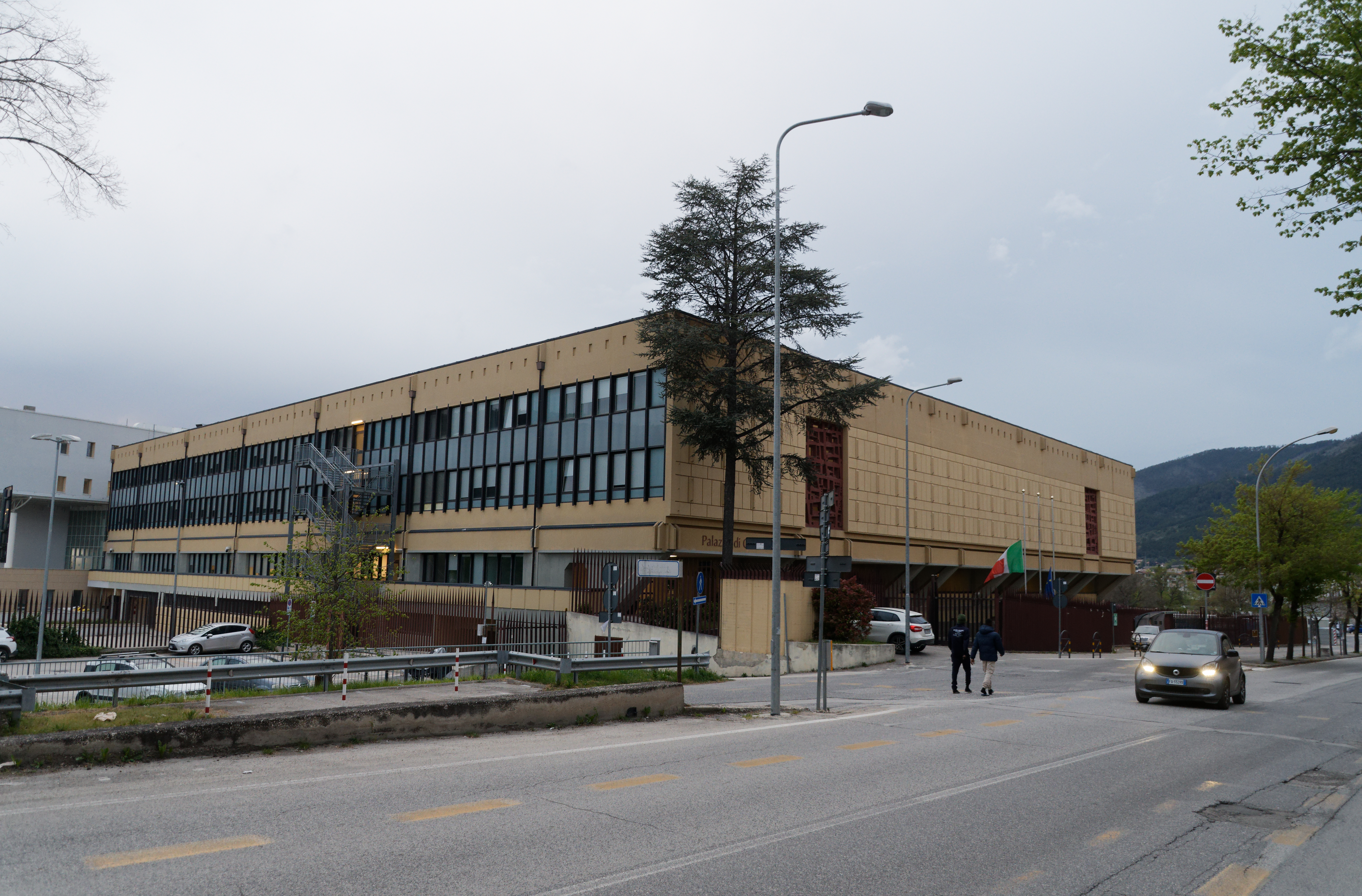
- Interactive map of the L'Aquila Courthouse area

General information
- Type: Courthouse
- Location: L'Aquila, Abruzzo, Italy
- Coordinates: 42°21′15.51″N 13°23′22.1″E
- Construction started: 1958
- Completed: 1962

Design and construction
- Architects: Enrico Lenti, Elio Piroddi, Renzo Sbriccoli, Emilio Tomassi

The L'Aquila Courthouse (Italian: Palazzo di Giustizia dell'Aquila, lit. 'Palace of Justice of L'Aquila') is a judicial complex located on Via XX Settembre in L'Aquila, Italy.

== History ==
The new courthouse of L'Aquila was built between 1958 and 1962. Its design was entrusted to engineers Enrico Lenti, Elio Piroddi, Renzo Sbriccoli, and Emilio Tomassi. Until then, the Court of L'Aquila and the Court of Appeal were located inside the central Palazzo Margherita, which is now the seat of the Town Hall.

In 2009, the building was severely damaged by the earthquake, rendering it unusable for several years. It was subsequently reopened after consolidation work and the demolition and reconstruction of some sections.

== Description ==
The courthouse is the central structure within a complex of public buildings situated between Via XX Settembre, Via Filomusi Guelfi, and Viale XXV Aprile, in an area bounded to the north by a remaining section of the ancient city walls.

It consists of two main blocks: a square-shaped structure on the west side and a long rectangular wing at the rear. The load-bearing structure is made of reinforced concrete, featuring an exposed frame with prefabricated panel infills, topped with simple pavilion-style roofs covered with tiles. The rear section, constructed after the earthquake, has different characteristics from the central core.

According to Marulli (2019), the building's composite structure "may appear disconnected, but it is unified internally through large glass windows and connecting ramps". The new wing "has a less static appearance, and its architectural expression reflects contemporary design, incorporating advanced technological solutions aimed at energy efficiency".

== Sources ==
- "Palazzo di Giustizia, progetti". L'architettura cronache e storia. Vol. 5. Venice. 1960. p. 142.
- Marulli, Paola (2019). "Nuove Dimensioni. L'Aquila guarda alla contemporaneità anche negli edifici di recente costruzione". D'Abruzzo. No. 125. Ortona. pp. 16–23.
- Caterina Palestini; Carlo Pozzi, eds. (2013). L'architettura in Abruzzo e Molise dal 1945 ad oggi. Selezione delle opere di rilevante interesse storico-artistico. Rome: Gangemi. pp. 72–73.
