= Mantua Courthouse =

Judiciary building in Mantua, Italy

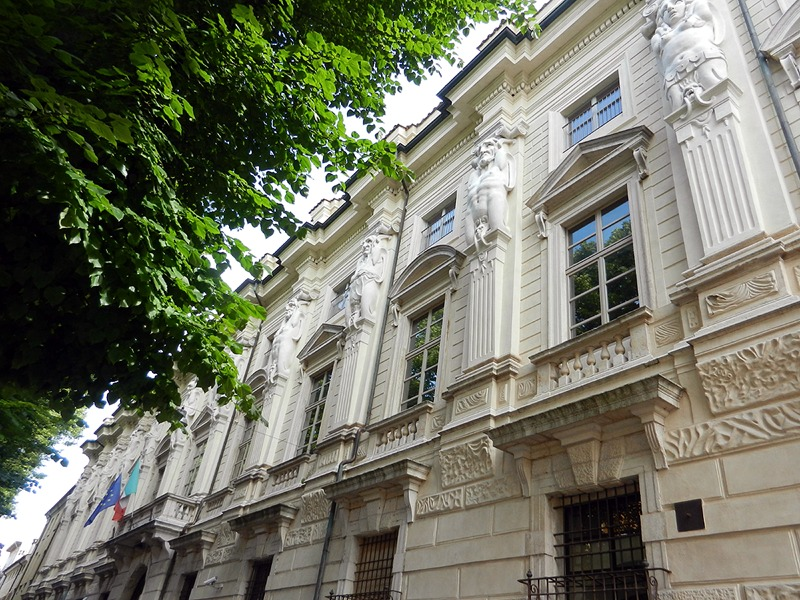
- Interactive map of the Mantua Courthouse area

General information
- Location: Mantua, Lombardy, Italy
- Coordinates: 45°9′12.66″N 10°47′18.27″E
- Construction started: 1599

Design and construction
- Architect: Antonio Maria Viani

The Mantua Courthouse (Palazzo di Giustizia) is a building located on Via Carlo Poma in Mantua, Italy. Dating back to the early 17th century, it was known as Palazzo Guerrieri Gonzaga and currently houses the Court, the Public Prosecutor's Office, and the judicial offices of Mantua.

== History ==
The palace was built between 1599 and 1603 by Giovanni Battista Guerrieri, a military officer in the service of the Gonzaga family. It incorporated an earlier building owned by Giacomo Boschetti, father of Isabella, mistress of Duke Federico II Gonzaga.

Over the centuries, the property changed hands several times: it passed from the Guerrieri Gonzaga family to the Nobili Gonzaga, then to the Gonzaga of Vescovato, the Trotti family, the Colloredo family, and finally to engineer Gian Francesco Jano in 1839, who sold it to the Municipality of Mantua in 1872. Since then, it has housed the Court of Mantua.

== Description ==
The architectural design is attributed to Antonio Maria Viani, superintendent of Gonzaga building projects from 1595 to 1632, possibly based on drawings by Giulio Romano. The stucco decorations inside the palace are also credited to Viani. The frescoes were painted by Orazio Lamberti from Cremona and Vincenzo Tragnoli.

The building is distinguished by its monumental façade, restored in 2008–2009, featuring twelve colossal stucco caryatids in the form of herms supporting the capitals.

The interior includes a large garden, enclosed by former stables and service buildings.

== Sources ==
- Coppadoro, Giovanni (2010). Antonio Maria Viani e la facciata di Palazzo Guerrieri a Mantova. Florence: Alinea.
- Perogalli, Carlo; Bascapè, Giacomo (1965). Palazzi privati in Lombardia. Milan: Electa.
- Segna, Luigi (1866). Guida di Mantova offerta al cittadino e al forestiero. Mantua.
