= Varese Courthouse =

Judiciary building in Varese, Italy

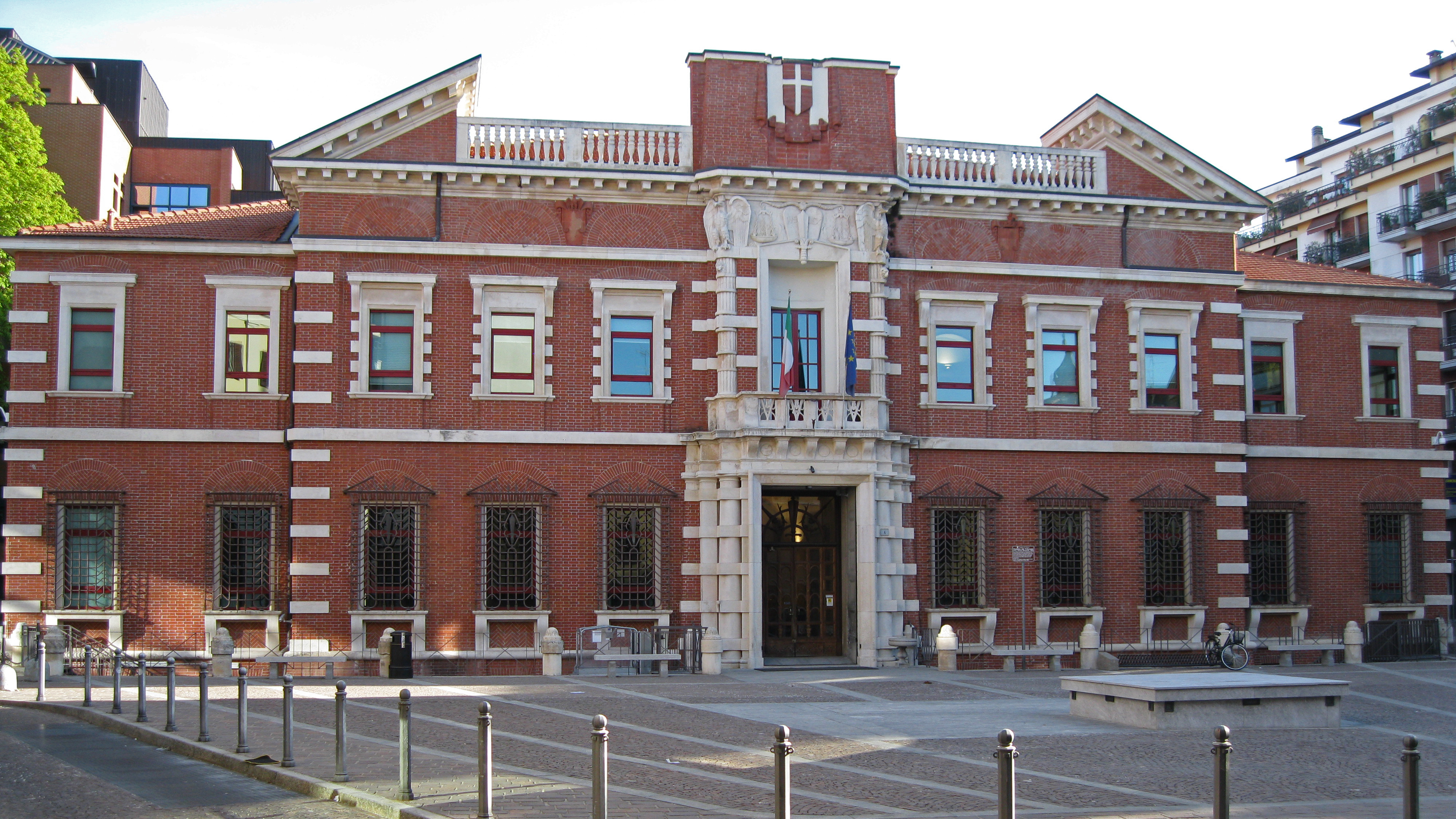
- Interactive map of the Varese Courthouse area

General information
- Architectural style: Baroque Revival
- Location: Varese, Lombardy, Italy
- Coordinates: 45°49′18.16″N 8°49′39.82″E
- Construction started: 1929
- Completed: 1930

Design and construction
- Architect: Vittorio Ballio Morpurgo

The Varese Courthouse (Palazzo di Giustizia) is a building located on Piazza Cacciatori delle Alpi in Varese, Italy.

== History ==
An early building was constructed on this site in 1843 to host the city's market, but was later repurposed after strong opposition from local merchants caused the market project to fail. Known ironically as the Malpensata ("bad idea"), the structure instead became Varese's first public school building, eventually housing the city's high school. The two-story porticoed building opened onto what was then Piazza San Martino, later renamed Piazza Cacciatori delle Alpi.

The courthouse was conceived as part of the city's broader effort to modernize its infrastructure following its designation as a provincial capital in 1927. The project was entrusted in 1929 to Roman architect Vittorio Ballio Morpurgo. The school building was demolished to make way for the new courthouse as part of a broader urban renewal plan.

Between 1990 and 1998, the building was restored and expanded based on designs by architects Pierguido Fagnoni and Franco Guerrieri.

== Description ==
The building's design blends elements of Roman Baroque ("barocchetto") and classical solemnity.

Its brick façade is accented with white Angera stone used for window frames, cornerstones, the main portal, and the upper balustrade. The portal is topped by a stone balcony with symbolic reliefs. The otherwise linear front is characterized by a broken pediment, a motif echoed in the wrought-iron window grilles.

A bronze statue of Justice by Daniele Scola once stood in the atrium but was melted down in 1940 for wartime needs.

== Sources ==
- Le nuove provincie del fascismo. Architetture per le città capoluogo. Pescara: Archivio di Stato di Pescara. 2001. p. 28.
- Guglielmi, Eugenio (2023). "Palazzo di Giustizia". Guida alla città di Varese. Itinerari di architettura del primo Novecento. Syracuse: Lettera Ventidue. pp. 44–45.
