= Nocera Inferiore Courthouse =

Judiciary complex in Nocera Inferiore, Italy

- Interactive map of the Nocera Inferiore Courthouse area

General information
- Type: Courthouse; Former hospital
- Location: Nocera Inferiore, Campania, Italy
- Coordinates: 40°45′4.53″N 14°39′4.18″E
- Construction started: 1882
- Opening: 31 December 1883; 142 years ago

The Nocera Inferiore Courthouse is a judicial complex located in Nocera Inferiore, Italy. The building currently housing the local courts was originally constructed as the "Vittorio Emanuele II" Psychiatric Hospital, founded in the late 19th century. Following the closure of the psychiatric institution, the site was repurposed for judicial and administrative functions and now serves as the seat of the Court of Nocera Inferiore and related offices.

== History ==
The building that currently serves as the courthouse of Nocera Inferiore was originally constructed as the "Vittorio Emanuele II" Psychiatric Hospital. The institution was founded in 1882 at the foot of the Chivoli hill, on the site formerly occupied by the Olivetan Monastery. Its establishment was promoted by Federico Ricco, who succeeded in forming a consortium of the provinces of Avellino, Bari, Campobasso, Cosenza, Foggia, and Salerno, with the aim of providing care for individuals affected by mental illness.

The hospital entered full operation on 31 December 1883. During the years, the complex underwent multiple architectural transformations. At least five major phases of modification can be identified, involving both the construction and demolition of several pavilions. Additional significant alterations occurred between 1940 and 1945 as a result of the World War II, which substantially affected the original layout of the hospital.

The Court of Nocera Inferiore, together with its Public Prosecutor's Office, was officially established by Law No. 127 of 11 February 1992 and began its activity on 12 October 1993. The project originated in the early 1980s and developed through several legislative proposals between 1984 and 1990. After a lengthy parliamentary process, the unified bill was approved in the early 1990s, leading to the formal creation of an autonomous court serving the Nocera Inferiore district. The court's first seat was located in the building on Via Correale, which had previously housed the local pretura.

After the definitive closure of the former psychiatric hospital in 1998, the large complex was reassigned to public administrative functions and subdivided into four areas. As part of this process of reuse and conversion, the judicial offices were gradually transferred from Via Correale to the former hospital site, which was adapted to serve as the new courthouse of Nocera Inferiore.

== Description ==
The complex was designed according to a pavilion-based scheme rather than as a single unified structure. The original layout consisted of a central building accompanied by several detached pavilions, arranged according to a "village" model. These buildings were spatially separated and embedded within landscaped areas, reflecting late 19th-century approaches to psychiatric architecture that emphasized environmental conditions as a therapeutic element.

Despite the extensive alterations carried out over time, the pavilion-based organization of the site remains partially legible. In its current configuration, the former hospital buildings house several judicial institutions. The main courthouse accommodates the Criminal Section of the Ordinary Court, the Public Prosecutor's Office, the administrative and accounting offices, and the offices of the Court President and the Administrative Director. Other buildings within the complex host the Civil Section of the Ordinary Court, the Justice of the Peace Court, and the UNEP (Office for Notifications, Enforcements and Protests).

== Sources ==
- Salomone, Giuseppina (2004). Il manicomio di Nocera Inferiore. Il Vittorio Emanuele II dal 1882 al 1924. Naples: Idelson-Gnocchi.
