= Campobasso Courthouse =

Judiciary building in Campobasso, Italy

- Interactive map of the Campobasso Courthouse area

General information
- Type: Courthouse
- Location: Campobasso, Molise, Italy
- Coordinates: 41°33′28.17″N 14°39′36.18″E
- Construction started: 1930
- Completed: 1936
- Inaugurated: 28 October 1935; 90 years ago

Design and construction
- Architects: Giuseppe Samonà, Camillo Autore
- Engineer: Silverio Pappalardo

The Campobasso Courthouse (Palazzo di Giustizia) is a judicial complex located on Piazza Vittorio Emanuele II in Campobasso, Italy. It serves as the main seat of the city's judicial offices, housing the Court of Campobasso, the Court of Appeal, the Public Prosecutor's Office, the Justice of the Peace and the administrative departments that manage judicial activities locally.

== History ==
The construction of the courthouse of Campobasso dates back to the 1930s, when the municipality decided to provide a permanent seat for judicial offices, which had previously operated in temporary locations across the city. The decision was made by podestà Nicola Correra on 21 August 1928. The design competition for the new courthouse saw the participation of the brothers Gaetano and Ernesto Rapisardi, Giuseppe Samonà, and Camillo Autore. The municipal council approved the project on 17 February 1930, elaborated by Samonà, and on 18 April 1931 the construction contract was awarded to the firm Vitali Domenico. Although Samonà's project was declared the winner, the building that was ultimately constructed shows many similarities with Autore's proposal. The design aimed to give the new building a solemn and rigorous character, reflecting the monumental dignity traditionally associated with judicial institutions. In 1939, the building was acquired by the State.

The works were carried out under the supervision of engineer Silverio Pappalardo and completed in 1936. The municipality financed the project largely from its own resources, also contracting a substantial loan with the Banco di Napoli. Requests for financial support from the Ministry of Grace and Justice remained unanswered due to the Ministry's own economic difficulties. The new courthouse was inaugurated on 28 October 1935 by podestà Renato Pistilli and originally hosted the Court of First Instance, the Royal Prosecutor, the Court of Assizes, and the Magistrate's Court.

Following the enactment of Law No. 416 of 5 June 1967, which established a branch of the Appellate courts in Campobasso under the jurisdiction of the Naples Appelate Court, the building also accommodated offices of the Court and the General Prosecutor. The Appellate Court became autonomous in accordance with Law No. 151 of 7 May 1986. In the 1990s, in response to the expansion of judicial functions and the need for additional office space, the top floor was added to accommodate new offices and improve the organization of the departments. As judicial activities grew in complexity, certain civil functions were moved to a secondary location on Via Crispi.

== Description ==
The building is constructed of stone and concrete and follows a rectangular plan, rising over a ground floor and three upper floors, the third of which was added during the 1990s extension. Its main façade faces Piazza Vittorio Emanuele II and is distinguished by a sober, monumental style, with references to Doric-inspired classical forms that convey the authority appropriate to a judicial institution. This austere and restrained style was deliberately adopted in accordance with the principles of Fascist architecture, which emphasized order, monumentality, and the symbolic power of the state.

A solid base and a prominent entrance on Via Antonio Nobile give the structure a commanding presence. The original wooden door bears the inscription "Dura lex sed lex", underlining the principle of the strict and impartial application of the law. Above the façade overlooking the square, the word "IVSTITIA" is sculpted. Additionally, a sculpted relief on the stone entrance ramp depicts Justice as a woman wielding a sword, a visual embodiment of legal authority and fairness.

Inside, the building contains courtrooms, magistrates' offices, administrative departments, and other supporting services. The main courtrooms on the ground floor are used for criminal proceedings, including those of the Court of Assizes. Upper floors house the Court's Presidency, the Public Prosecutor's Office, secretarial offices, and the civil department, including execution, bankruptcy, and voluntary jurisdiction sections.
