= Tivoli Courthouse =

Judiciary building in Tivoli, Italy

- Interactive map of the Tivoli Courthouse area

General information
- Location: Tivoli, Lazio, Italy
- Coordinates: 41°57′33.47″N 12°47′42.17″E
- Construction started: 1729

The Tivoli Courthouse is a judicial complex located on Viale Nicolò Arnaldi in Tivoli, Italy.

== History ==
The building that today houses the courthouse was originally constructed in 1729 by the Jesuits as a residence for Roman nobles during their stays in the countryside. Throughout the eighteenth and nineteenth centuries it welcomed several distinguished guests, including Popes Leo XII in 1826, Gregory XVI, and Pius IX in 1846.

In 1874 a renovation project was approved that converted the structure into the new "Scuola di Borgo Nuovo", inaugurated in 1877. In 1882, the institution was renamed "Nicolò Tommaseo" Elementary School. World War II brought interruptions and damage to the building, but it was restored and reopened in 1987.

On 3 December 1999, the Council of Ministers, chaired by Massimo D'Alema and acting on a proposal by the Minister of Justice, Oliviero Diliberto, approved the establishment of the Tivoli Court, despite a negative opinion from the High Council of the Judiciary. One of the factors that contributed to the decision was the availability—offered by the Municipality of Tivoli—of the "Niccolò Tommaseo" complex as the future seat of the court.

On 1 October 2001, the court began its activities in provisional locations, including the Scuderie Estensi, a building in Via Acquaregna, and the former magistrate's court, all of which had been promptly renovated for temporary use. On 7 October 2006, the court moved into its permanent headquarters within the Tommaseo complex, which had undergone extensive refurbishment to meet the requirements of modern judicial functions.

The expansion of the complex was completed on 18 December 2014 with the opening of the Public Prosecutor's Office. In 2019, this wing of the building was dedicated to magistrate Francesca Laura Morvillo, who was assassinated on 23 May 1992.
