= List of courthouses =

This is a list of notable courthouses. These are buildings that have primarily been used to host a court. In some countries, "courthouse" is not the term used, instead the term for the building is simply "court". Courthouses have often been designed to be architecturally grand or imposing.

== International ==
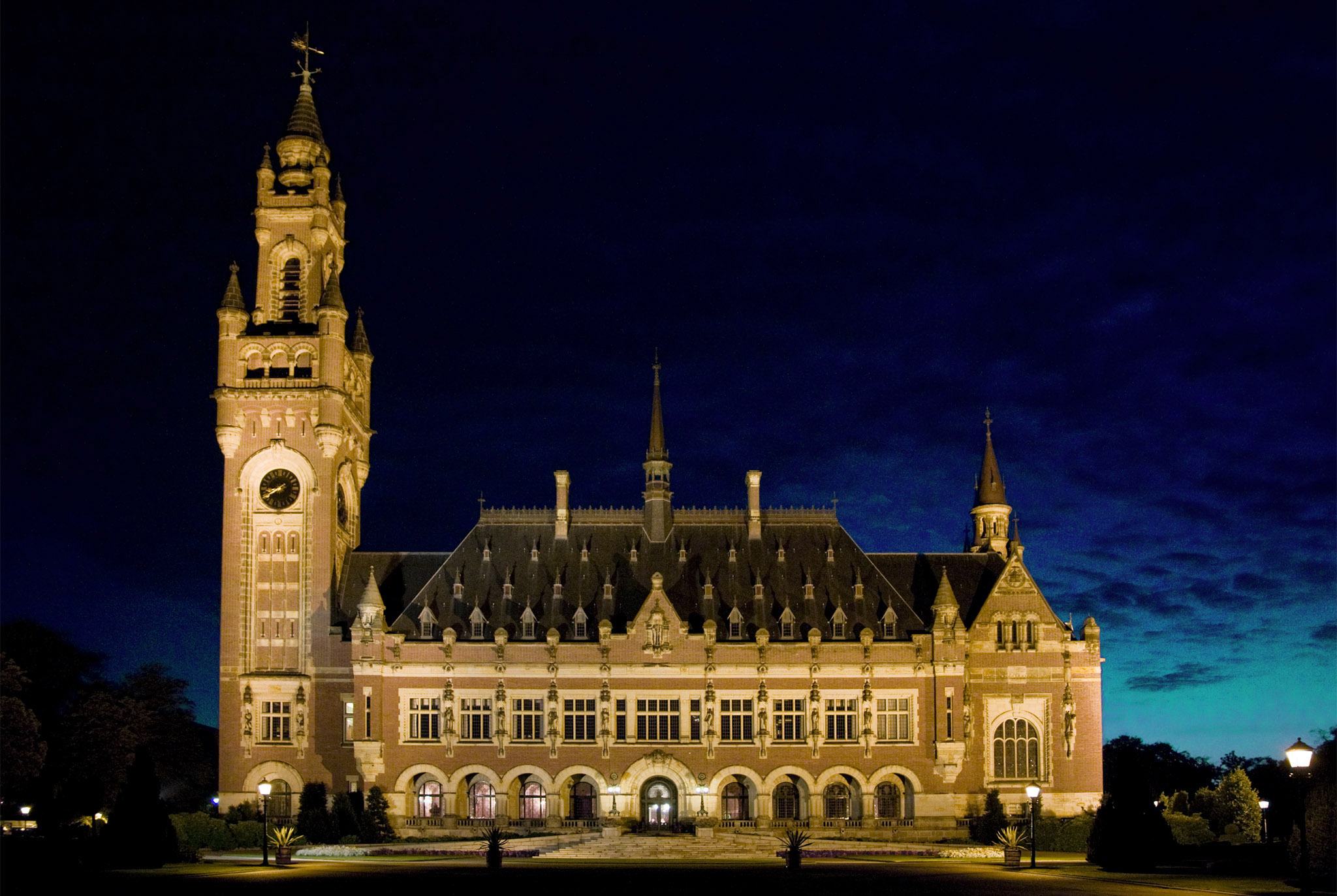
Peace Palace

European Court of Human Rights

Courthouses of courts having international scope include:

- Peace Palace, in The Hague, Netherlands, seat of International Court of Justice of the United Nations
- European Court of Human Rights, Strasbourg, France
- Future permanent premises of the International Criminal Court, The Hague
- Building of the Caribbean Court of Justice, Port of Spain, Trinidad and Tobago
- Building(s) of the Inter-American Court of Human Rights, San José, Costa Rica

== Europe ==
=== Albania ===
- Constitutional Court of Albania
- Supreme Court of Albania

=== Belgium ===
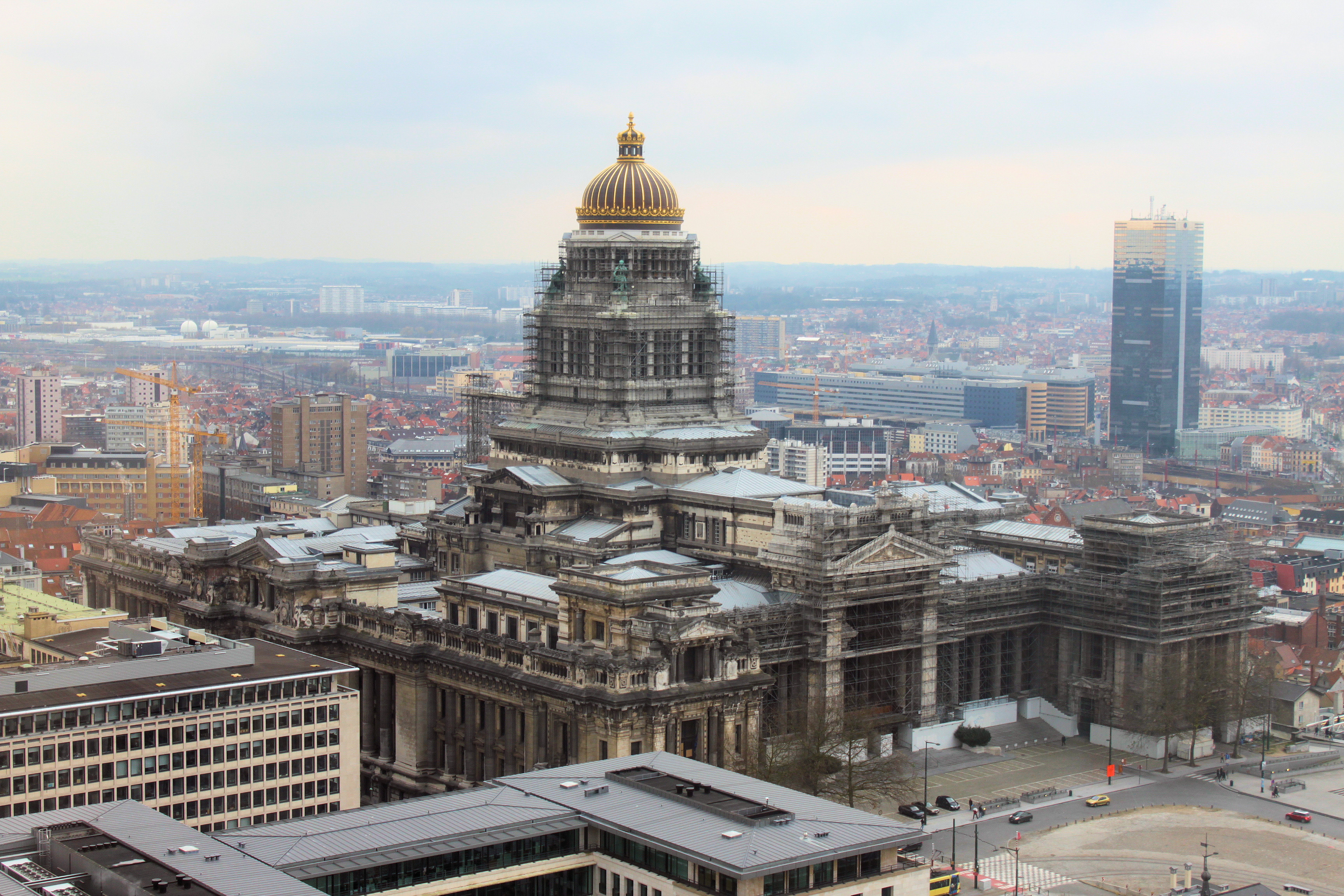
Brussels Palace of Justice

- Palace of Justice Antwerp
- Palace of Justice, Brussels

=== Denmark ===
- Copenhagen Court House
- Courthouse and Jail, Esbjerg
- Frederiksberg Courthouse

=== France ===
- Palais de justice historique de Lyon
- Palais de Justice, Paris
- Palais de Justice, Strasbourg

=== Germany ===
- Kammergericht, Berlin
- Kriminalgericht, Berlin
- Landgericht Berlin
- Reich Court building, Leipzig
- Justizpalast (Munich)
- Palace of Justice, Nuremberg

=== Ireland ===
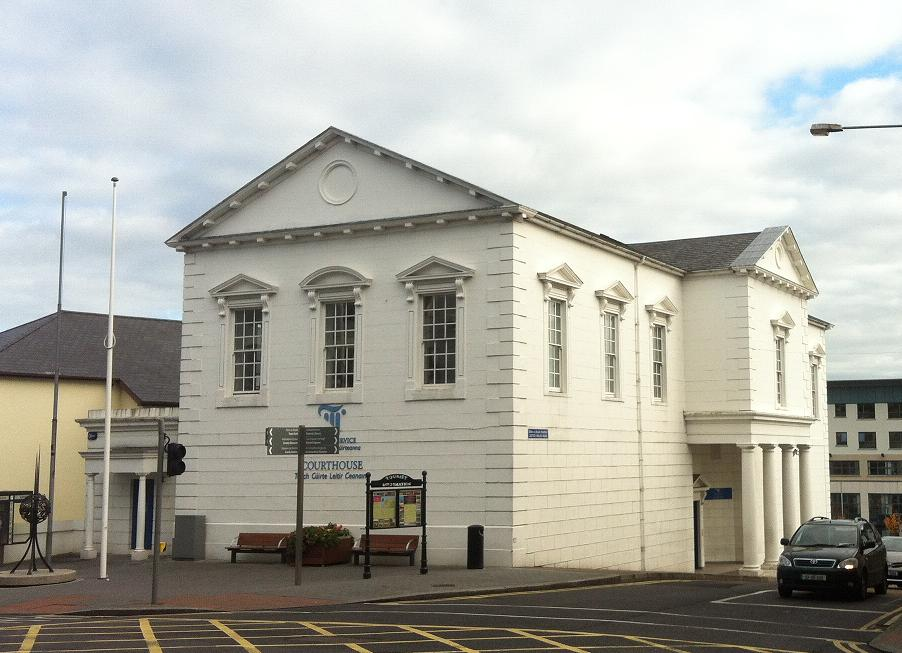
Courthouse, Letterkenny, County Donegal, Ireland

- Four Courts
- Criminal Courts of Justice (Dublin)
- Green Street Court House

=== Italy ===
- Florence Courthouse
- Genoa Courthouse
- Milan Courthouse
- Palace of Justice, Rome
- Palermo Courthouse
- Savona Courthouse

=== Malta ===
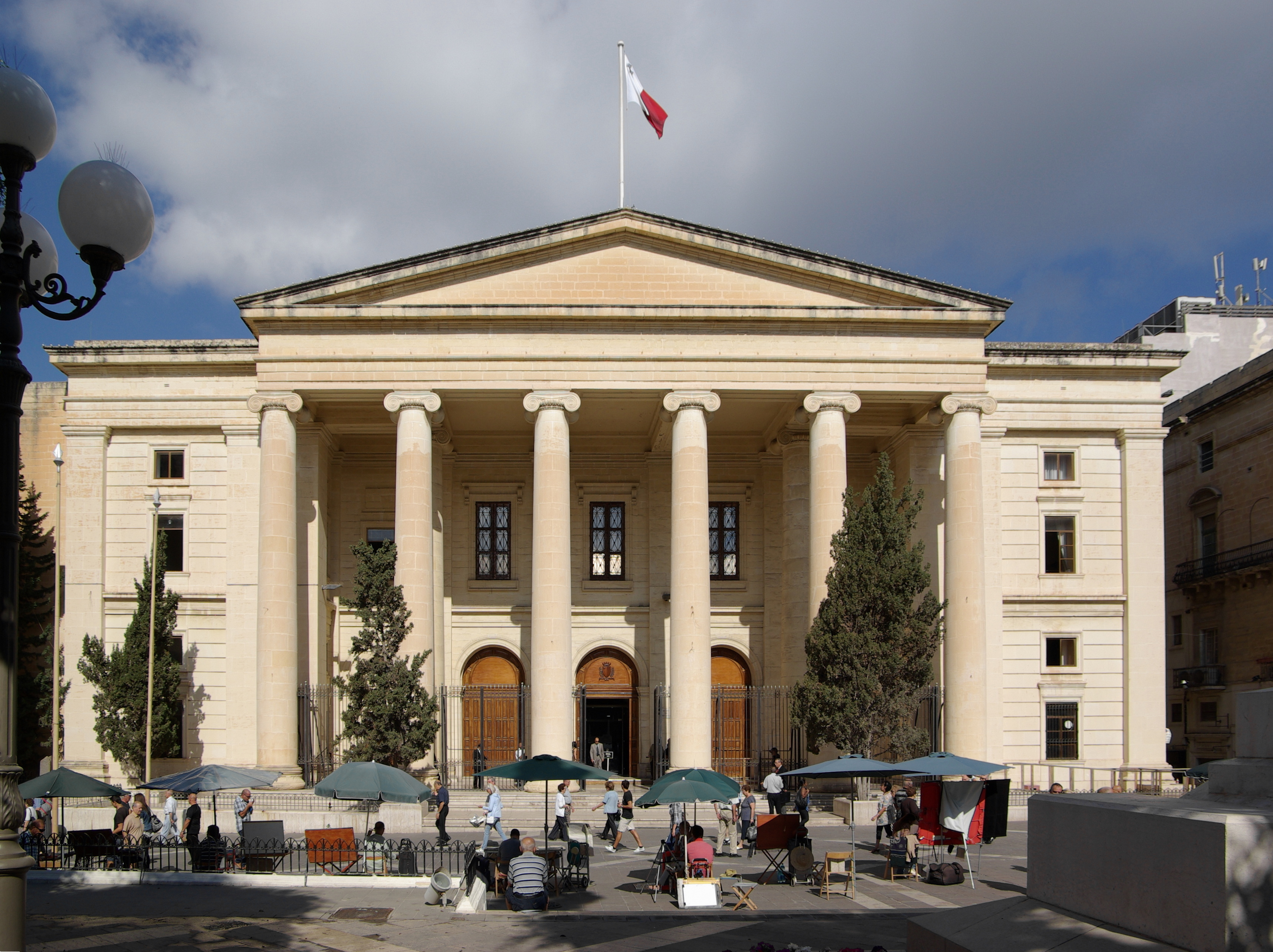
Courts of Justice, Valletta, Malta

- Auberge d'Auvergne, formerly a courthouse
- Auberge d'Italie, formerly a courthouse
- Banca Giuratale (Mdina), formerly a courthouse
- Castellania, formerly a courthouse
- Corte Capitanale, formerly a courthouse
- Courts of Justice building (Valletta)
- Inquisitor's Palace, formerly a courthouse

=== Netherlands ===
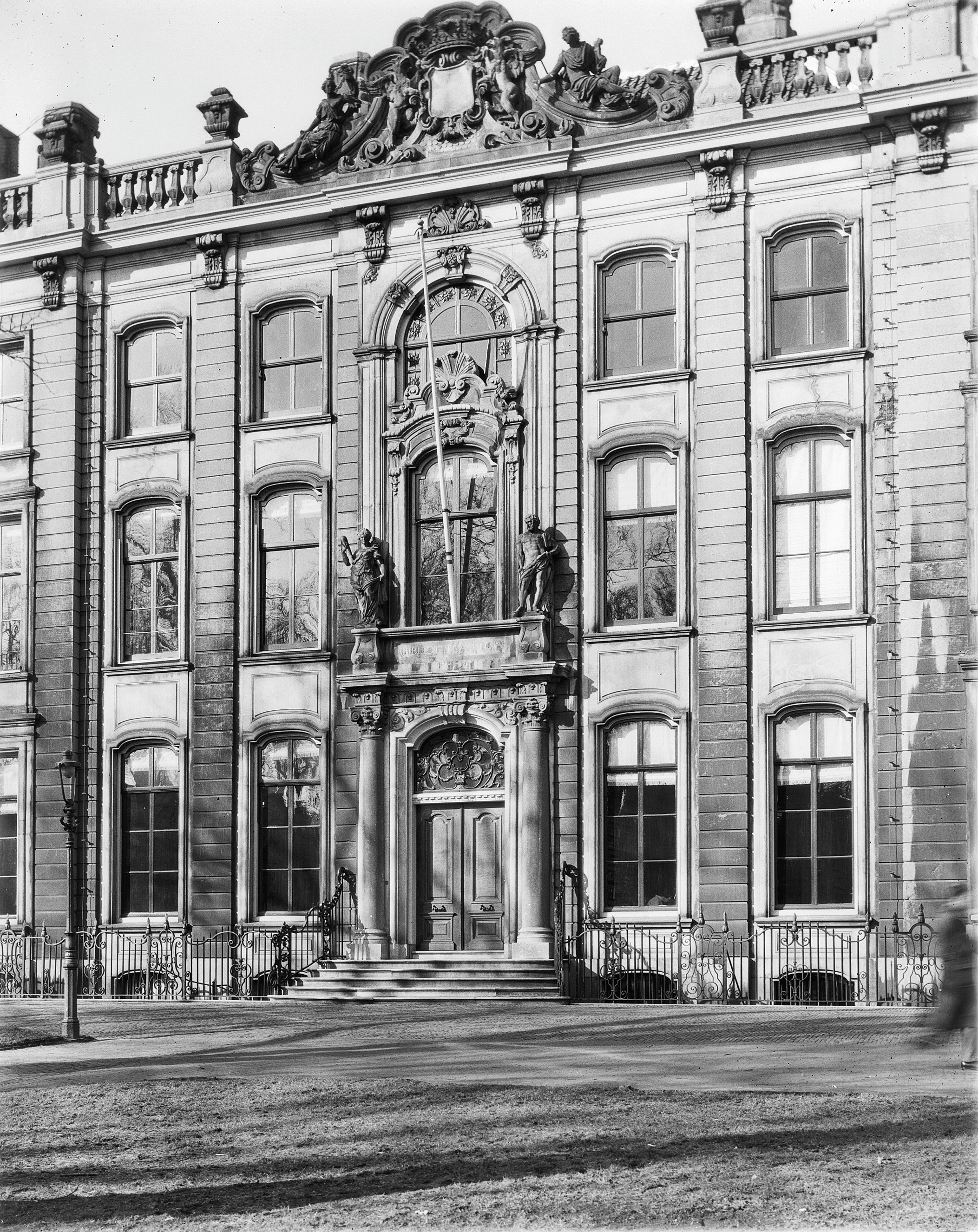
Huis Huguetan

- Supreme Court of the Netherlands, The Hague
  - Hoge Raad der Nederlanden / Huis Huguetan
  - Modern building(s) of the Supreme Court of the Netherlands
- Rechthuis (Bellingwolde), former courthouse used 1643–1811, a national historic site since 1972, now a private residence

=== Romania ===
- Palace of Justice, Bucharest
- Tulcea Art Museum, a former courthouse

=== Sweden ===
- Bonde Palace
- Stockholm Court House
- Wrangel Palace

=== United Kingdom ===
==== Scotland ====
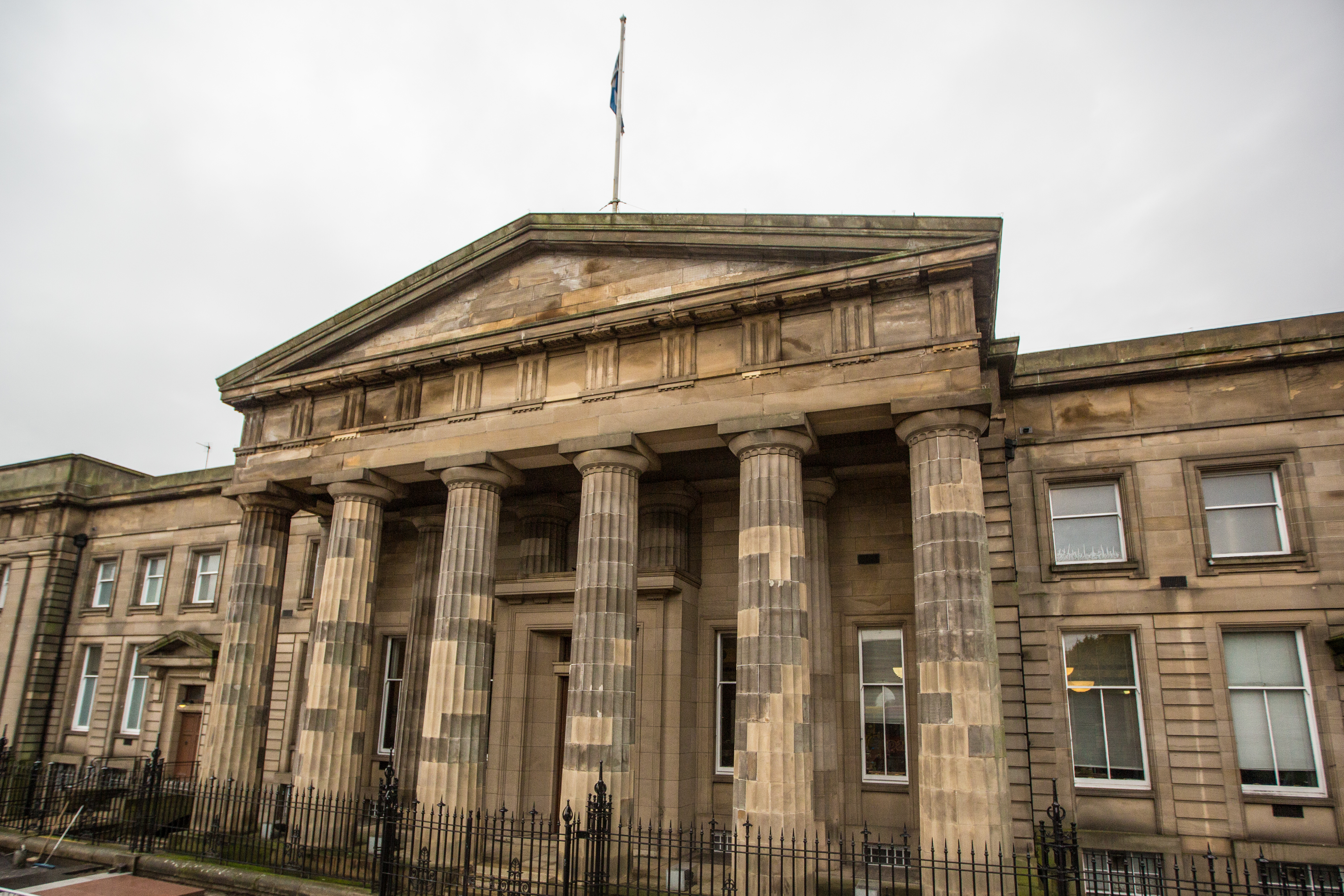
Justiciary Buildings, Glasgow, Scotland

- Edinburgh Sheriff Court
- Glasgow Sheriff Court
- Hamilton Sheriff Court
- Paisley Sheriff Court

==== England and Wales ====
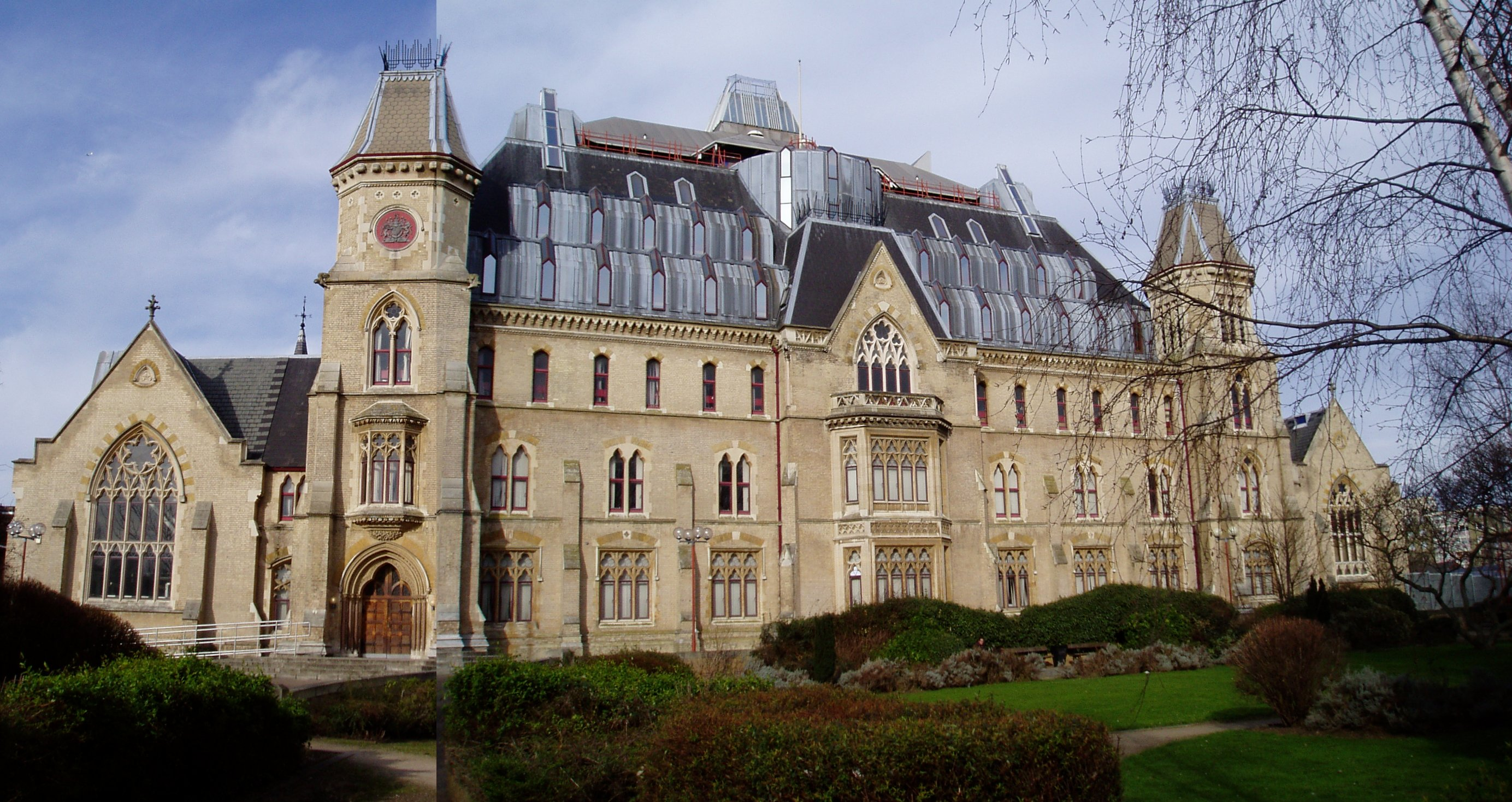
Wood Green Crown Court, in North London

- List of Crown Court venues in England and Wales
- List of county court venues in England and Wales
- List of former county courts in Wales

=== Other Europe ===
- Palace of Justice, Vienna, Austria
- Palais de Justice, Brussels, Belgium
- Sofia Court House, Bulgaria
- Helsinki Court House, Finland
- Judiciary City, Luxembourg
- Oslo Courthouse, Norway
- Courthouse in Września, Poland
- Courthouse (Ljubljana), Slovenia
- Istanbul Justice Palace, Turkey

== Americas ==
=== Canada ===
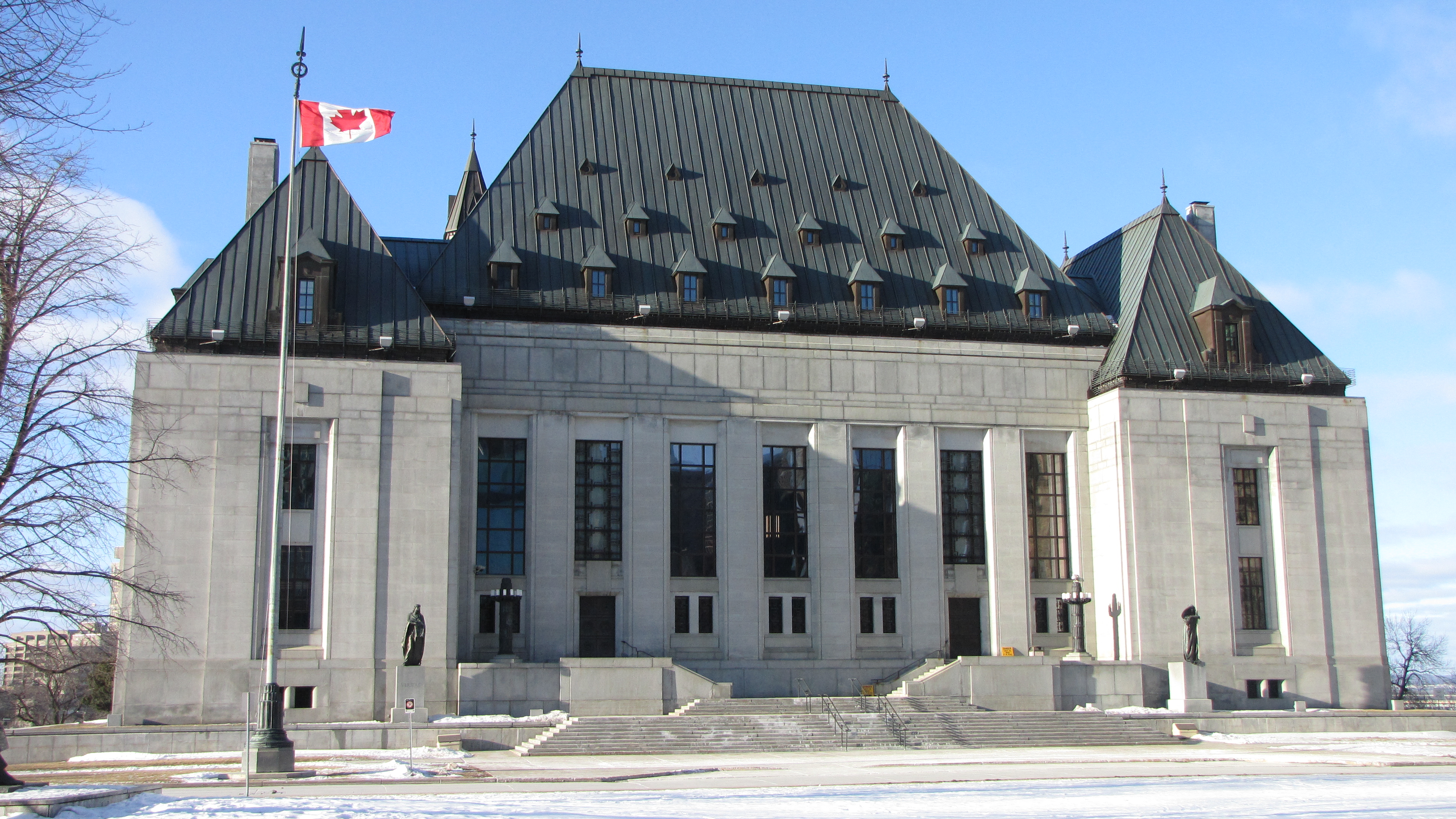
Supreme Court of Canada building, in Ottawa

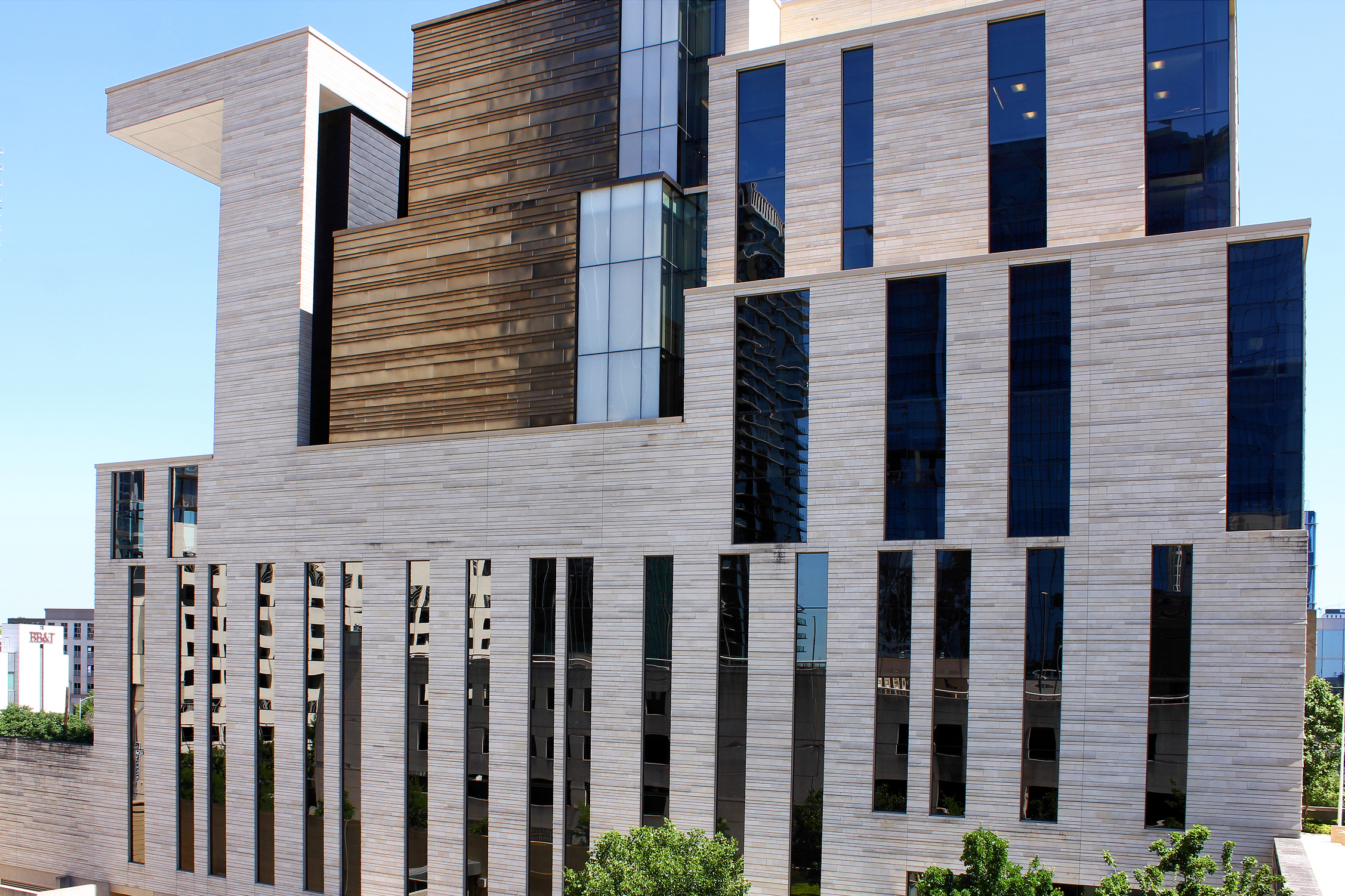
The Federal Courthouse in Austin is a rare use of modernism in courthouse design.

- Calgary Courts Centre, Alberta
- Law Courts (Edmonton), Alberta
- Law Courts (Vancouver), British Columbia
- Vancouver Art Gallery, British Columbia
- Charlotte County Court House, New Brunswick, the oldest Canadian courthouse in continuous operation
- Moncton Law Courts, New Brunswick
- Halifax Court House, Nova Scotia
- Kings County Museum, Nova Scotia
- A. Grenville and William Davis Courthouse, Ontario
- Adelaide Street Court House, Ontario, former Toronto courthouse
- Frontenac County Court House, Kingston, Ontario
- Mackenzie Hall, Ontario, former Essex County courthouse
- Old City Hall (Guelph), Ontario
- 10 Armoury Street, Toronto, Ontario - new Toronto Courthouse
- Old City Hall (Toronto), Ontario - former courthouse
- College Park (Toronto);- former courthouse
- Old Newmarket Town Hall and Courthouse, Ontario
- Osgoode Hall, Ontario
- Ottawa Courthouse, Ontario
- Peel County Courthouse, Ontario
- Perth County Courthouse, Ontario
- Renfrew County Courthouse, Ontario
- Second Supreme Court of Canada building, Ottawa, Ontario
- Supreme Court of Canada, Ottawa, Ontario
- Toronto Courthouse, Ontario
- Édifice Ernest-Cormier, Quebec, a former courthouse
- Édifice Lucien-Saulnier, Quebec
- Palais de justice (Montreal), Quebec
- Battleford Court House, Saskatchewan
- Moose Jaw Court House, Saskatchewan

=== United States ===
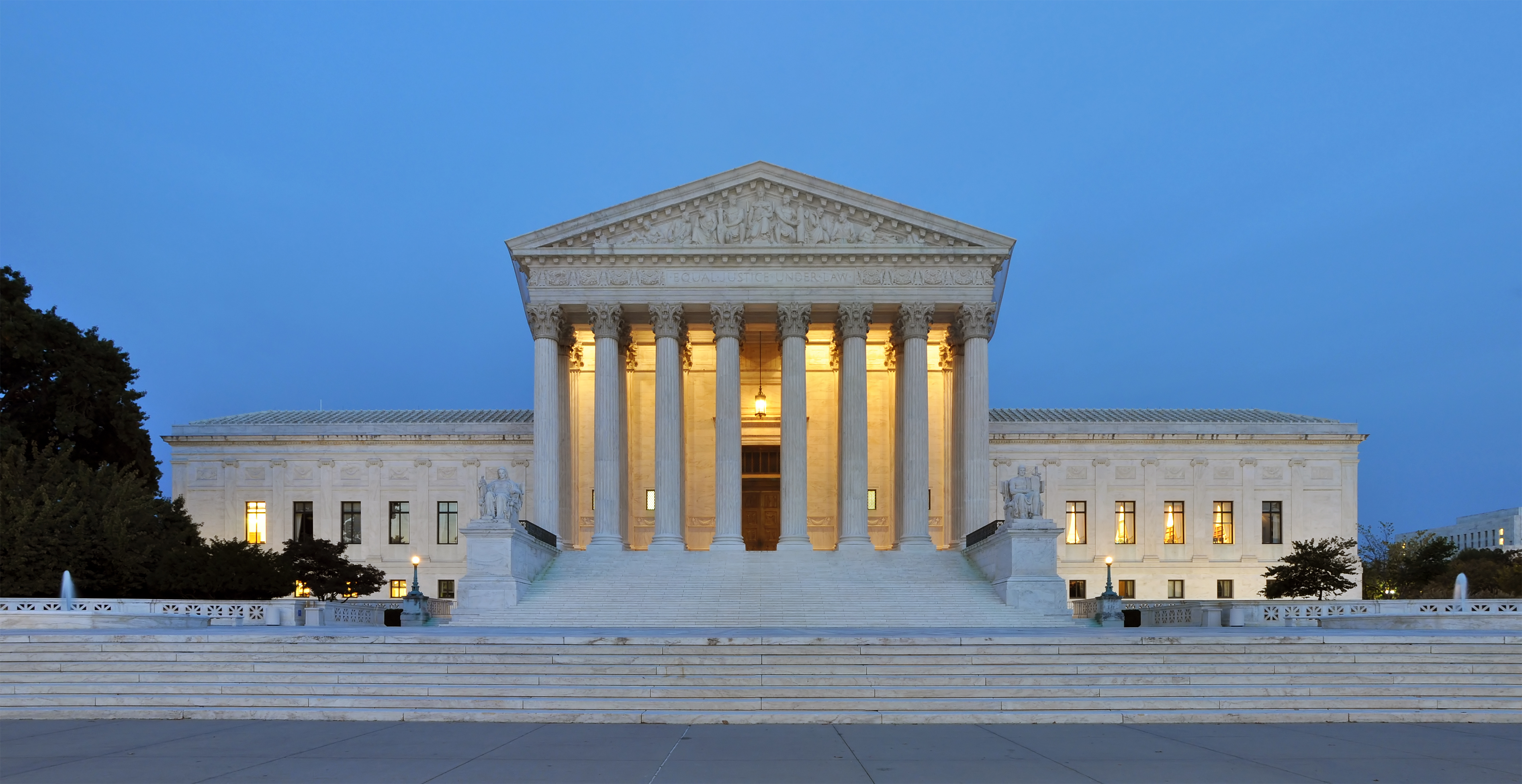
United States Supreme Court Building

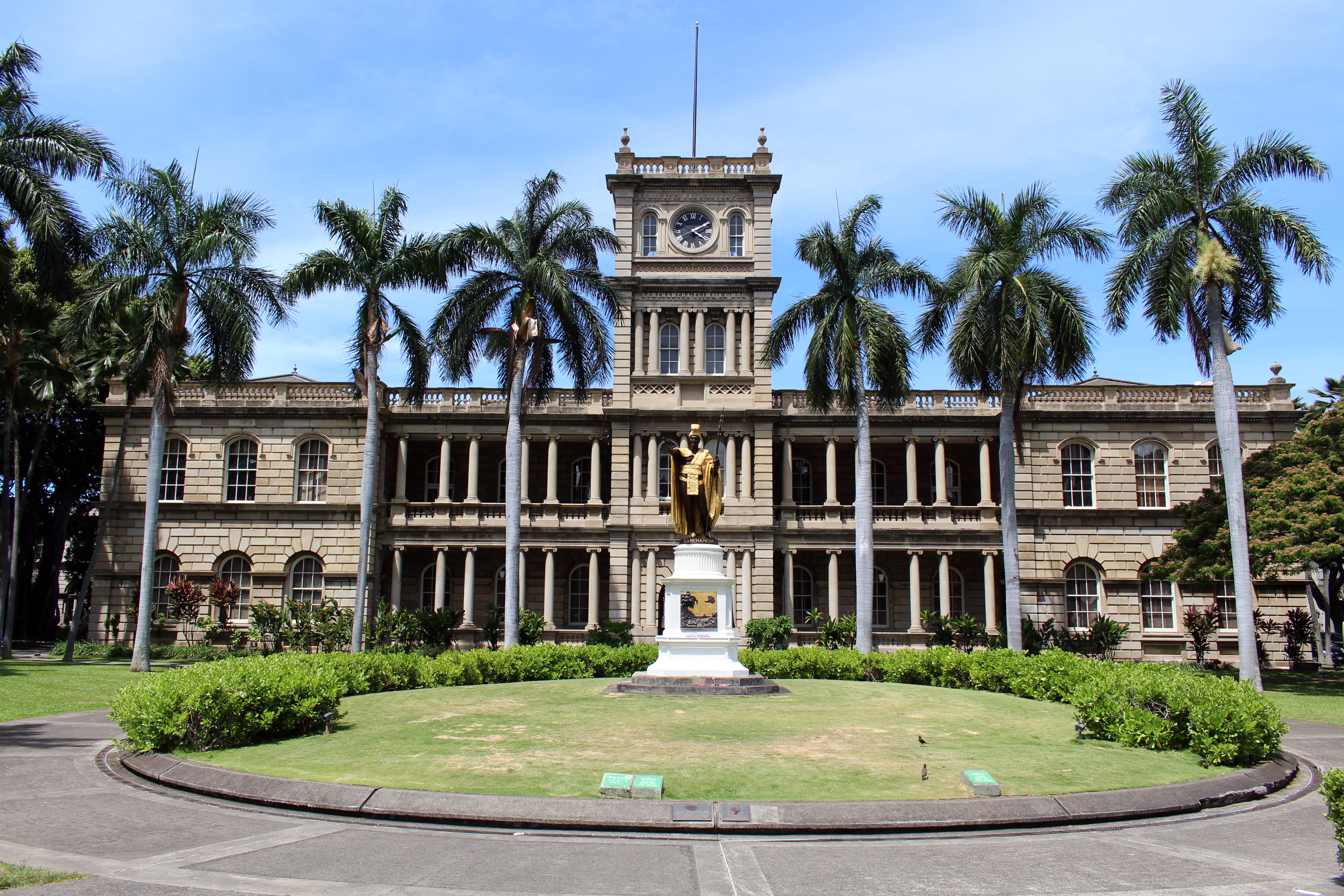
Aliʻiōlani Hale, home of the Supreme Court of Hawaii

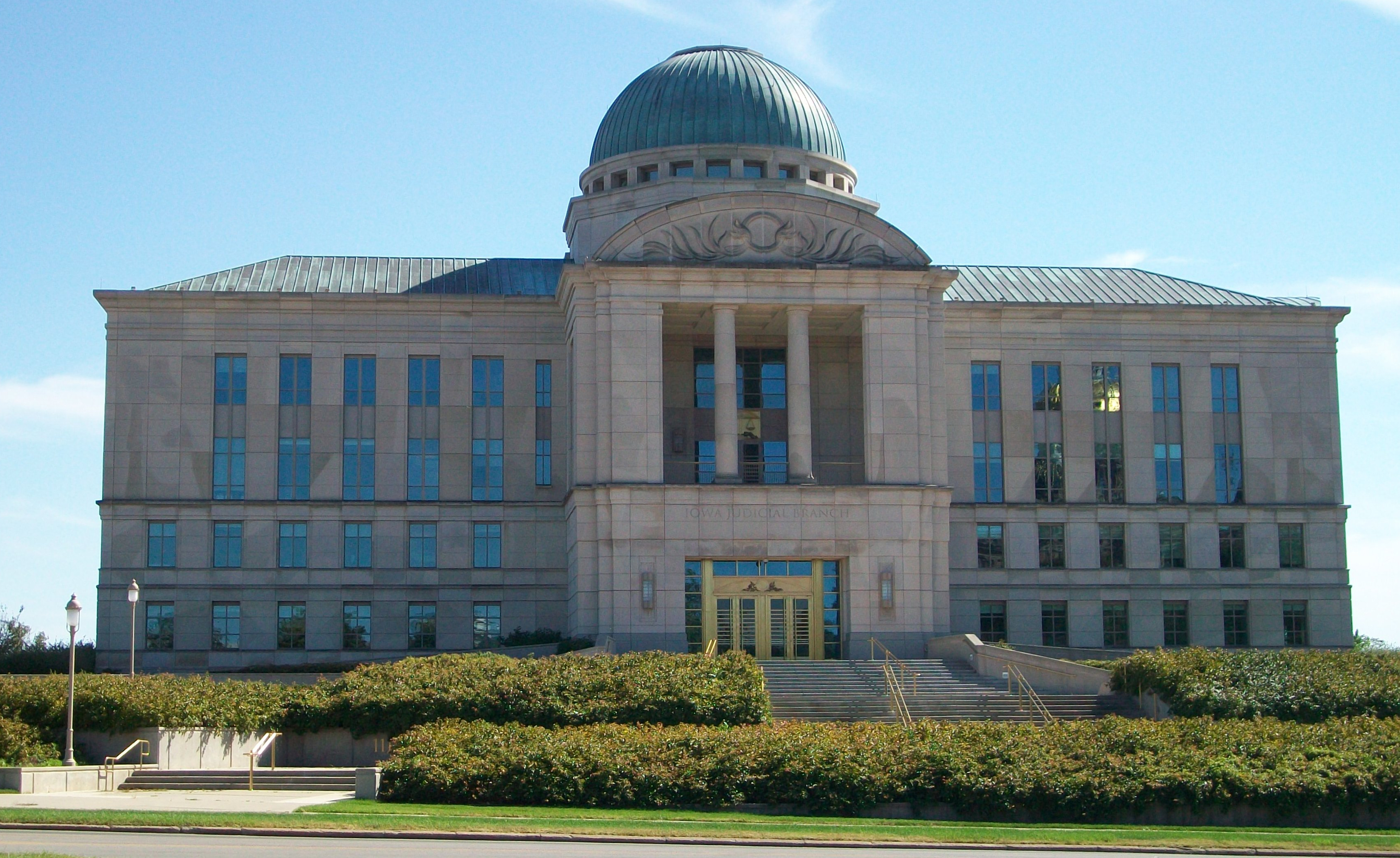
Iowa Judicial Branch Building, home of the Iowa Supreme Court

- Aliʻiōlani Hale, Honolulu, Hawaii
- Alton Lennon Federal Building and Courthouse, Wilmington, North Carolina
- Austin United States Courthouse, Austin, Texas
- Birch Bayh Federal Building and United States Courthouse, Indianapolis, Indiana
- Byron White United States Courthouse, Denver, Colorado
- Caldwell County Courthouse, Lockhart, Texas
- Carl B. Stokes United States Courthouse, Cleveland, Ohio
- Charles R. Jonas Federal Building, Charlotte, North Carolina
- Dan M. Russell Jr. United States Courthouse, Gulfport, Mississippi
- Daniel Patrick Moynihan United States Courthouse, Manhattan, New York City
- E. Barrett Prettyman United States Courthouse, Washington, D.C.
- Edward R. Roybal Federal Building and United States Courthouse, Los Angeles, California
- Federal Building and Post Office (Brooklyn), Brooklyn, New York City
- Frank R. Lautenberg Post Office and Courthouse, Newark, New Jersey
- Gene Snyder United States Courthouse, Louisville, Kentucky
- Harold D. Donohue Federal Building and United States Courthouse, Worcester, Massachusetts
- Howard M. Metzenbaum United States Courthouse, Cleveland, Ohio
- Hugo L. Black United States Courthouse, Birmingham, Alabama
- Iowa Judicial Branch Building, Des Moines, Iowa
- James R. Browning United States Court of Appeals Building, San Francisco, California
- Joel W. Solomon Federal Building and United States Courthouse, Chattanooga, Tennessee
- John Joseph Moakley United States Courthouse, Boston, Massachusetts
- John Minor Wisdom United States Court of Appeals Building, New Orleans, Louisiana
- John W. McCormack Post Office and Courthouse, Boston, Massachusetts
- Lewis F. Powell Jr. United States Courthouse, Richmond, Virginia
- Martin Luther King Building & U.S. Courthouse, Newark, New Jersey
- Ohio Judicial Center, Columbus, Ohio
- Pete V. Domenici United States Courthouse, Albuquerque, New Mexico
- Philadelphia City Hall & Courthouse, Philadelphia, Pennsylvania
- Richard H. Chambers United States Court of Appeals, Pasadena, California
- Richard C. Lee United States Courthouse, New Haven, Connecticut
- Theodore Levin United States Courthouse, Detroit, Michigan
- Theodore Roosevelt United States Courthouse, Brooklyn, New York City
- Thomas F. Eagleton United States Courthouse, St. Louis, Missouri
- Thurgood Marshall United States Courthouse, Manhattan, New York City
- United States Supreme Court Building, Washington, D.C.

=== Mexico ===
- Supreme Court of Justice of the Nation, Mexico City, Mexico

=== South America ===
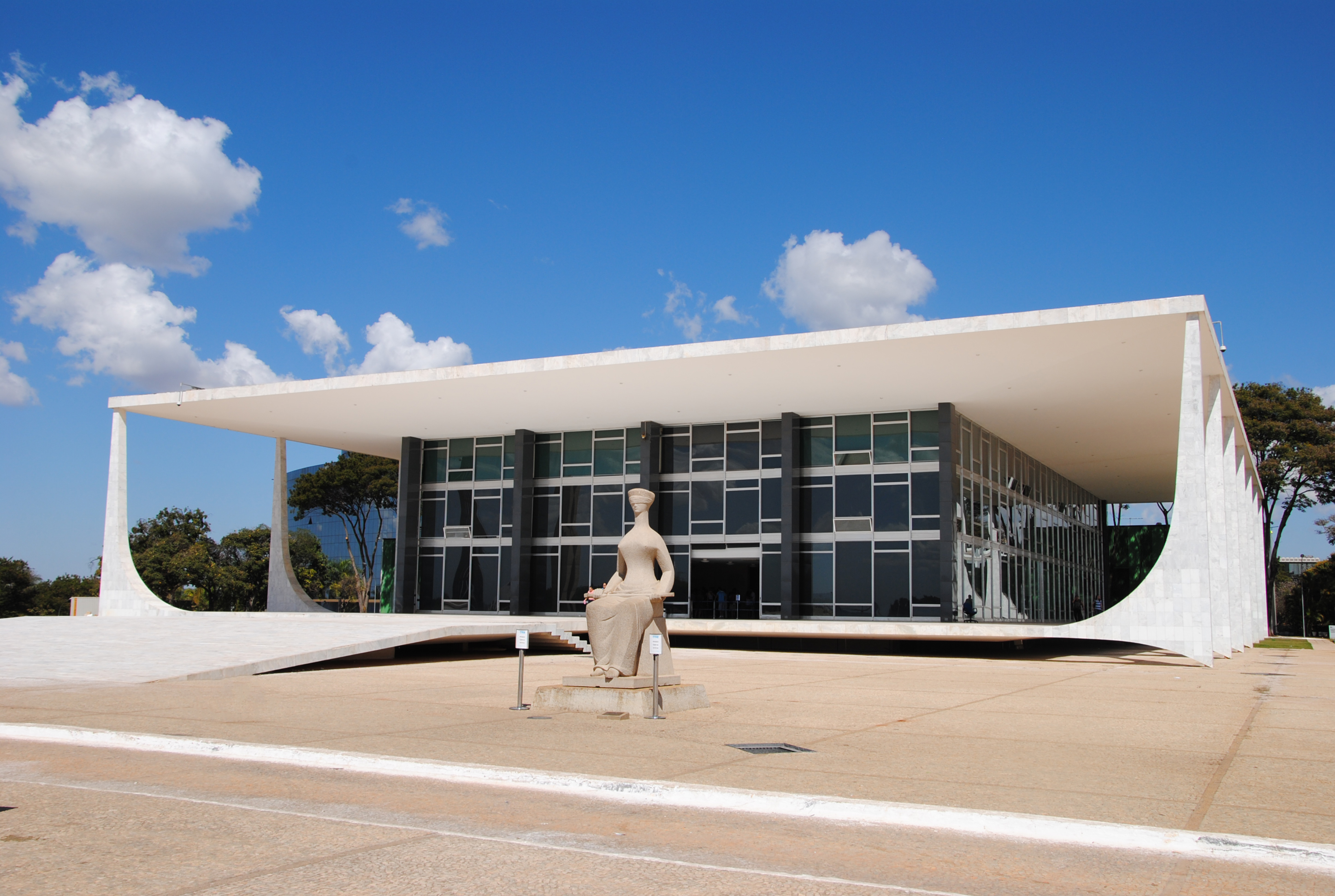
Supreme Federal Court of Brazil, in Brasília

- Palace of Justice of the Argentine Nation. Argentina
- Supreme Federal Court Palace, Brazil
- Palace of Justice of São Paulo, Brazil
- Palace of Justice of Amazonas, Brazil
- Palacio de los Tribunales de Justicia de Santiago, Chile
- Palace of Justice of Colombia
- Palace of Justice, Lima, Peru
- Piria Palace, Montevideo, Uruguai
- Palacio de Justicia de Caracas, Venezuela

== Asia ==
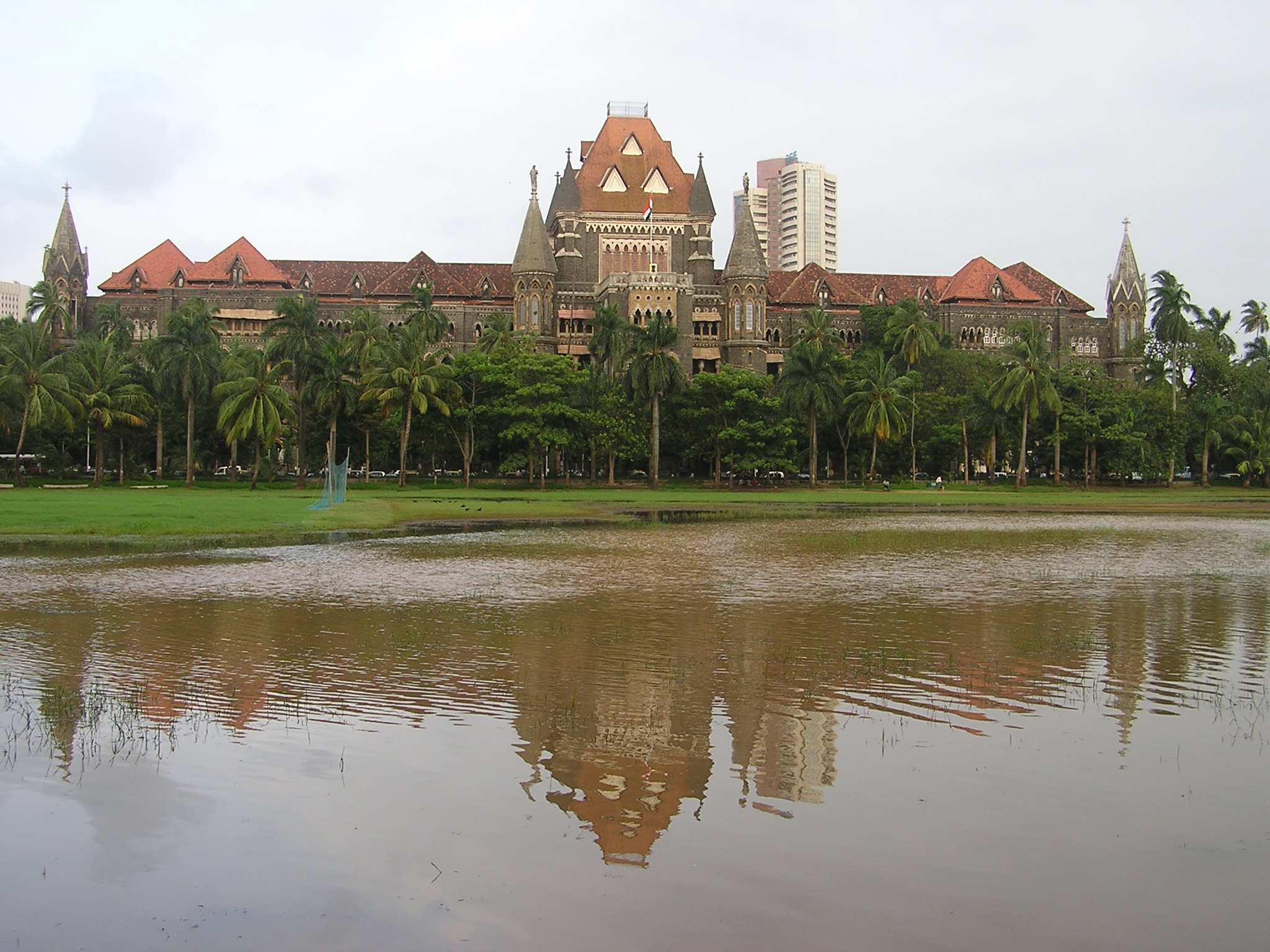
Bombay High Court

=== India ===
- Bombay High Court, India
- Madras High Court, India
- Patiala House Courts Complex, India
- Tis Hazari Courts Complex, India

=== Malaysia ===
- Kuala Lumpur Courts Complex
- Palace of Justice, Putrajaya

=== Other Asia ===
- Old High Court Building, Dhaka, Bangladesh
- Supreme People's Court, China
- Former Central Magistracy, Hong Kong, a former courthouse
- Court of Final Appeal Building, Hong Kong, a former courthouse
- Old Supreme Court Building, Singapore

== Africa and Middle East ==
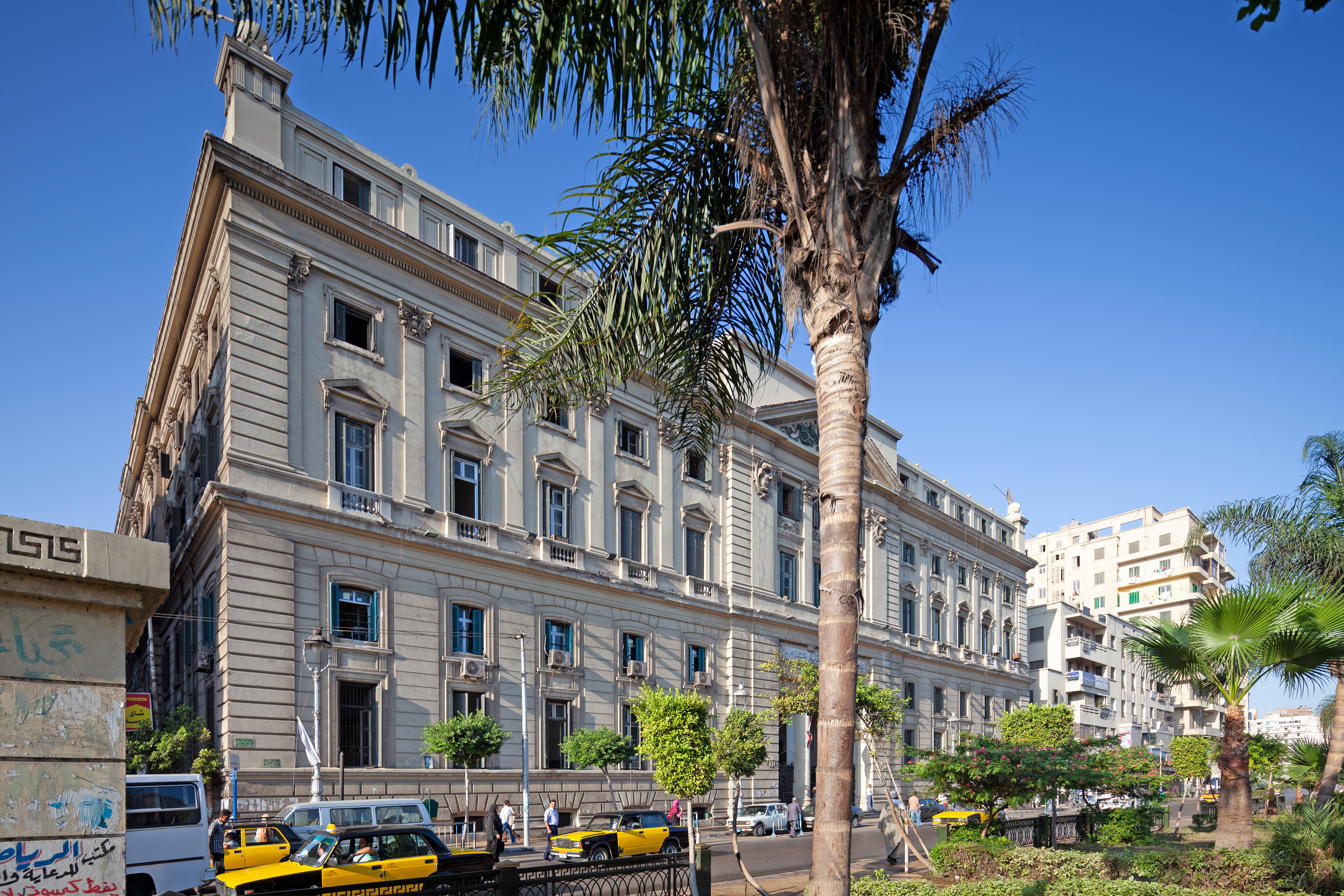
El-Hakaneia Palace, Egypt

- El-Hakaneia Palace, Alexandria, Egypt
- Federal Supreme Court of Ethiopia
- Temple of Justice, Liberia
- Mahkamah Mosque, a former courthouse in Palestine
- Courthouse of Tehran, Iran
- Supreme Court of Appeal, South Africa

== Australia and Pacific ==
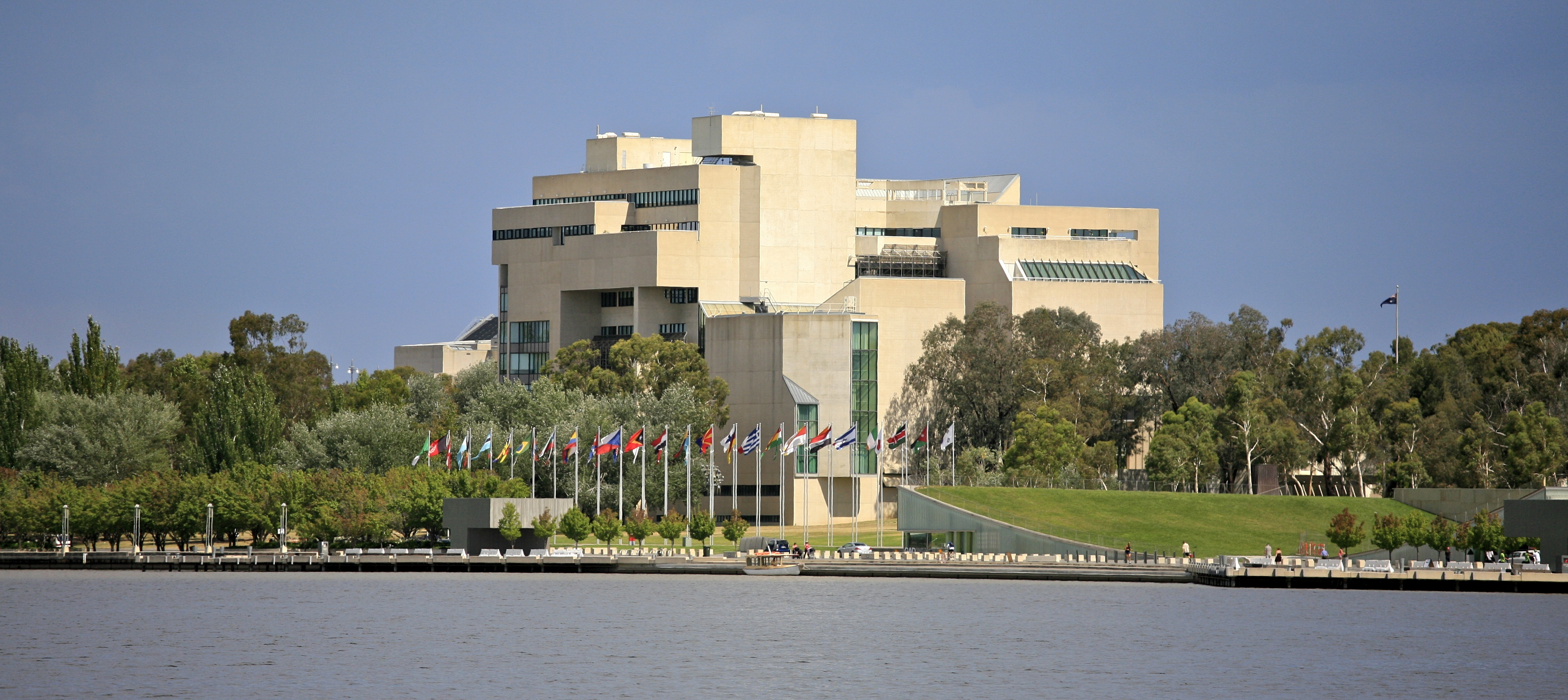
High Court of Australia, Canberra

=== Australia ===
- High Court of Australia, Canberra, Australian Capital Territory

==== New South Wales ====
- Courthouses in New South Wales, including:
  - Downing Centre, Sydney
  - Parramatta Justice Precinct, Sydney

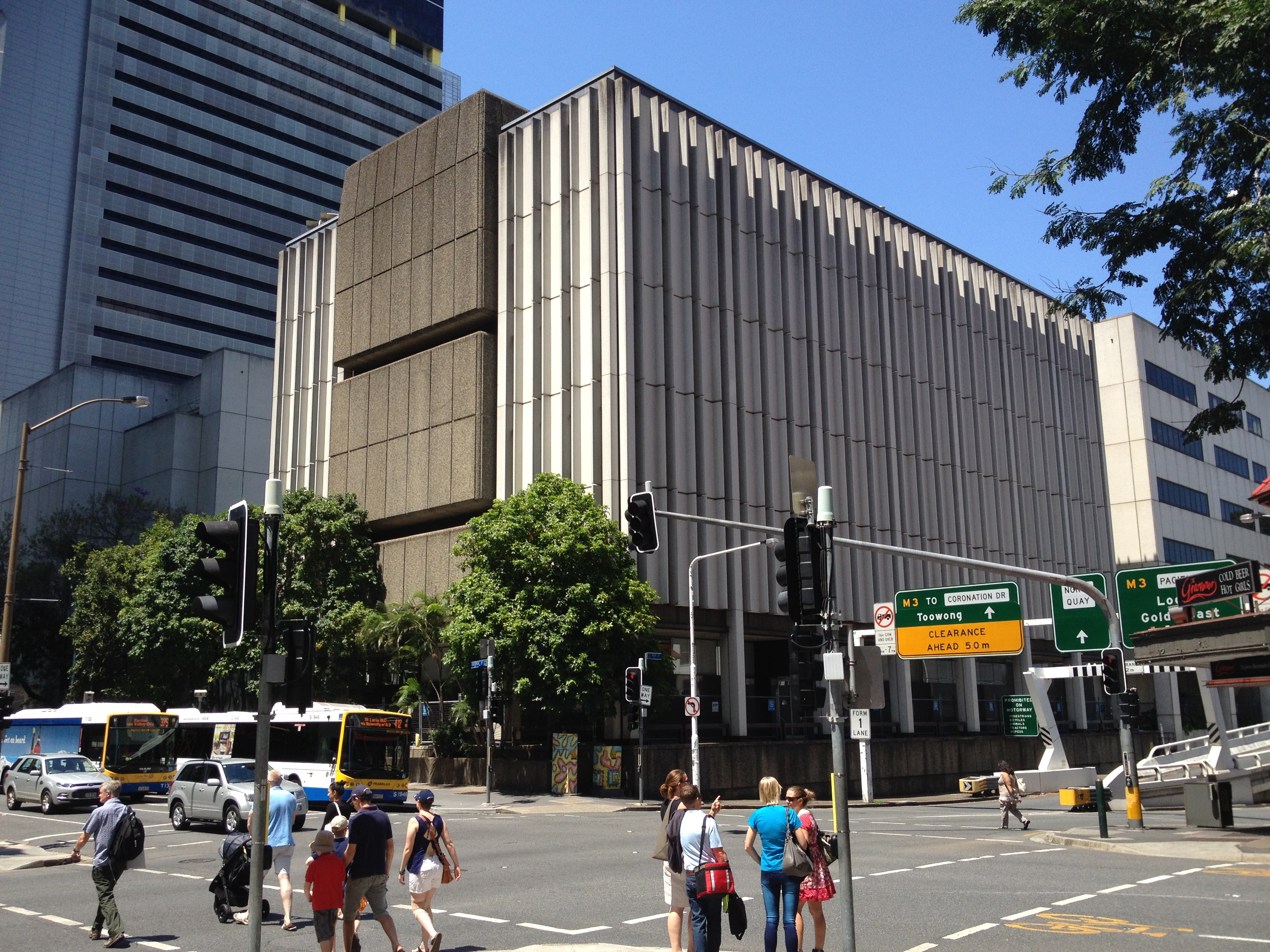
Former Law Courts building, Brisbane

==== Queensland ====
- Atherton Courthouse
- Ayr Court House
- Bowen Courthouse
- Brisbane Magistrates Court
- Bundaberg Police Station
- Charters Towers Courthouse
- Childers Court House
- Cloncurry Courthouse
- Drystone Wall, Melton Hill
- Gladstone Court House
- Gympie Court House
- Ingham Court House
- Innisfail Courthouse
- Ipswich Courthouse
- Law Courts, Brisbane
- Mackay Court House and Police Station
- Mackay Courthouse
- Maryborough Courthouse
- Mount Morgan Court House and Police Station
- Old Cleveland Police Station
- Old Ipswich Courthouse
- Old Toowoomba Court House
- Pomona Court House
- Queen Elizabeth II Courts of Law, Brisbane
- Rockhampton Courthouse
- Roma Courthouse
- Rosewood Courthouse
- Southport Courthouse
- St Lawrence Police Station
- Toowoomba Court House
- Townsville Magistrates Court
- Tully Court House
- Warwick Court House

==== South Australia ====
- Supreme Court of South Australia, Adelaide
- Magistrates Court of South Australia, Adelaide
- District Court of South Australia, main seat in Adelaide; other regional circuit courts

==== Victoria ====
- Supreme Court of Victoria, Melbourne
- Former Melbourne Magistrates' Court, Melbourne
- Melbourne Magistrates' Court, Melbourne
- Supreme Court of Victoria, Melbourne

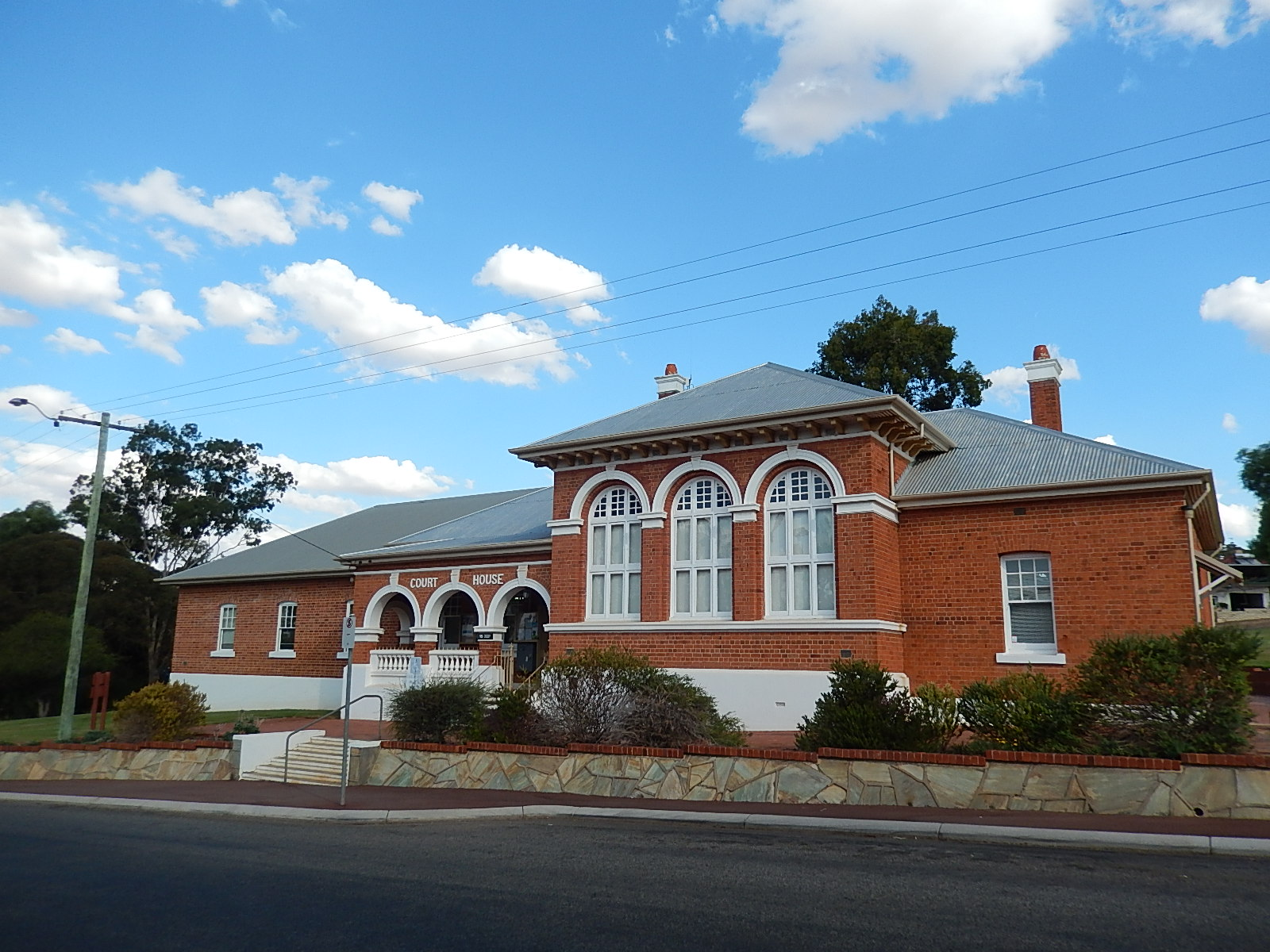
Toodyay Court House, Toodyay, Western Australia

==== Western Australia ====
- Children's Court of Western Australia, Perth
- District Court of Western Australia, Perth
- Family Court of Western Australia, Perth
- Magistrates Court of Western Australia, Perth
- Old Court House, Perth, Perth, constructed 1896–97, used until 1902
- Supreme Court of Western Australia, Perth
- Toodyay Court House, Toodyay

=== New Zealand ===
- Dunedin Law Courts
