= Courthouse station =

Courthouse station may refer to:

- Courthouse station (MBTA), an underground bus rapid transit station in Boston, Massachusetts
- Courthouse station (San Diego Trolley), a light rail station in San Diego, California
- Courthouse station (Utah Transit Authority), a light rail station in Salt Lake City, Utah
- Pioneer Courthouse station, a light rail station in Portland, Oregon
- Court House station, a Washington Metro station in Arlington, Virginia

== See also ==
- Courthouse (disambiguation)
