= Palazzo INPS, Milan =

Palazzo INPS
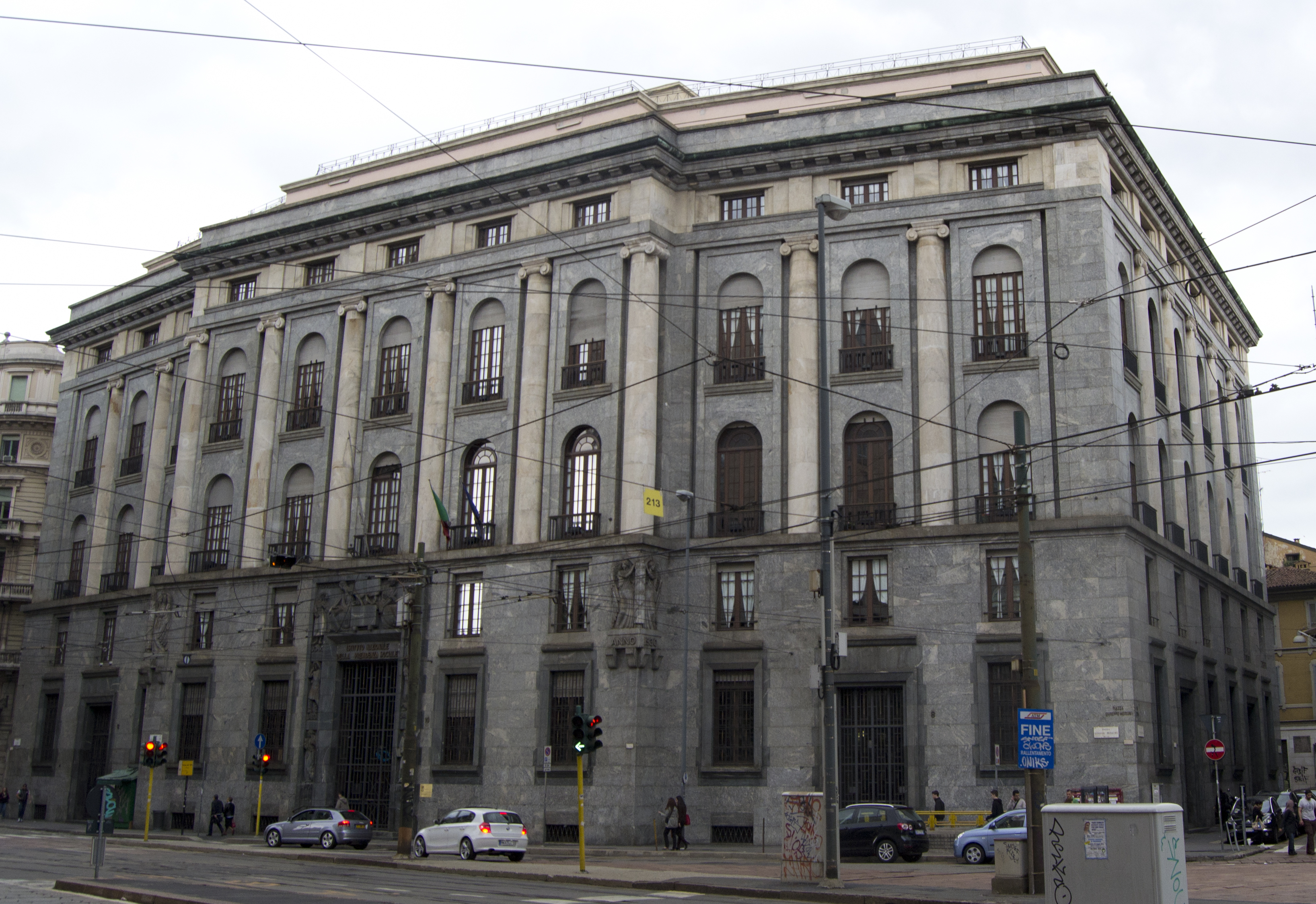
- Palazzo INPS on the right

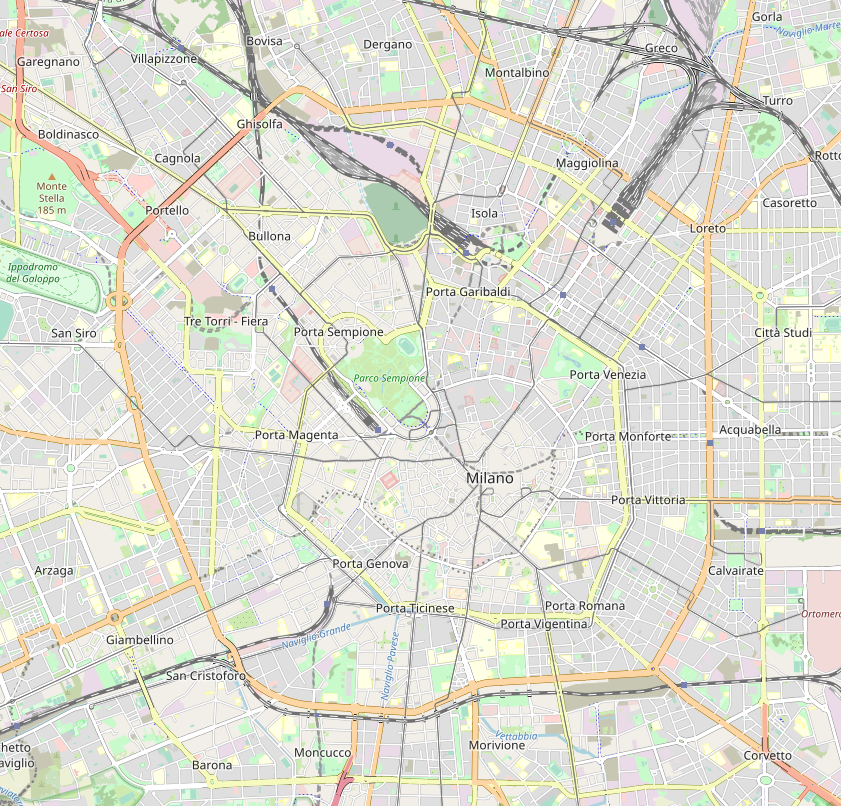
- Location within Milan Location within Italy

General information
- Location: Milan, Italy
- Coordinates: 45.46060°N 9.18812°E
- Completed: 1931

Design and construction
- Architects: Marcello Piacentini, Ernesto Rapisardi

The Palazzo dell'Istituto Nazionale della Previdenza Sociale (INPS) is at Piazza Giuseppe Missori, 10 in central Milan. It was designed by Marcello Piacentini and Ernesto Rapisardi, and completed in 1931 to house the regional offices of the Istituto nazionale della previdenza sociale (National Institute for Social Security), the Italian public retirement system. The INPS built new offices in 1961 at via Melchiorre Gioia, which have now been replaced.

The lower three stories of the building are of grey-veined stone; the upper stories are marked by monumental order pilasters and simple rounded arches framing the windows. The building has recessed wings, following the curve of the intersection of Corso Italia and the piazza. The central portal is decorated with allegories of the duties and goals of the organization: amor, labor, domus, and providencia on the left and virtus, salus, fides, and praevidentia on the right. The date is given in the Era Fascista calendar as Anno VIII under brackets supporting two angels flanked by fasces.

== See also ==
- Palazzo Missori
