= Pisa Courthouse =

Judiciary building in Pisa, Italy

- Interactive map of the Pisa Courthouse area

General information
- Status: Completed
- Location: Pisa, Tuscany, Italy
- Coordinates: 43°42′57.9″N 10°24′23″E
- Construction started: 1938
- Completed: 1958
- Opening: 1958; 68 years ago

Design and construction
- Architect: Gaetano Rapisardi

The Pisa Courthouse (Italian: Palazzo di Giustizia di Pisa, lit. 'Palace of Justice of Pisa') is a judicial complex located in Pisa, Italy.

== History ==
The courthouse is located between Piazza della Repubblica, Via Giuseppe Giusti, Via Santa Bibbiana, and Via del Buschetto. Its construction was decided in 1935 on a site previously occupied by old buildings slated for demolition, with the aim of resolving architectural and hygienic issues.

The design competition, open to engineers and architects, was won in 1938 by architect Gaetano Rapisardi. The conceptual ideas ranged from irregular structures with internal courtyards to simpler, more monumental solutions, utilizing high-quality materials such as granite, porphyry, and marble. In 1938, Rapisardi proposed a more symmetrical and monumental variant, featuring a single rectangular block and road connections leading toward Piazza Cairoli. Construction began in 1938, but was interrupted in 1941. It resumed in 1947, and was completed in 1958 under the direction of architect Ivo Lambertini.

== Sources ==
- Architettura e Arti Decorative. Vol. X, no. 1. 1929. pp. 373–386.
- "Concorso per il Palazzo di Giustizia di Pisa". Architettura. Vol. XV, no. 11. November 1936. pp. 555–560.
- A. Martinelli (1993). Pisa. Urbanistica e architettura fra le due guerre. pp. 44–47, 116–117.
- P. Rosselli; O. Fantozzi Micali; G. C. Romby (1985). Fascismo e centri storici in Toscana. Florence. p. 112.
- E. Tolaini (1992). Pisa. pp. 174–184.
