= Courthouse (disambiguation) =

A courthouse is a building that houses a court of law; the term is most common in North America.

Courthouse may also refer to:

- Court House, Arlington, Virginia, a neighborhood of Arlington, Virginia, U.S.
- Courthouse (Colonial Williamsburg), part of the Williamsburg Historic District, Virginia, U.S.
- Courthouse (Ljubljana), Slovenia
- Courthouse (TV series), a 1995 legal drama TV series
- The Courthouse, Thirsk, arts centre in England

== Transportation ==
- Court House station, in Arlington, Virginia, United States
- Courthouse station (MBTA), in Boston, Massachusetts, United States
- Courthouse station (San Diego Trolley), in San Diego, California, United States
- Courthouse station (TRAX), in Salt Lake City, Utah, United States
- Pioneer Courthouse station, in Portland, Oregon, United States

== See also ==
- List of courthouses
