= Gaetano Rapisardi =

Italian architect

- Born: 6 October 1893; Syracuse, Sicily, Kingdom of Italy
- Died: 5 December 1988 (aged 95); Rome, Lazio, Italy
- Education: University of Florence
- Occupation: Architect

Gaetano Rapisardi (6 October 1893 – 5 December 1988) was an Italian architect.

== Life and career ==
After attending the Technical Schools in his hometown Syracuse, Rapisardi moved to Florence to study at the Faculty of Architecture, graduating after participating in World War I. He was primarily active in Tuscany, Sicily, and Rome, the city where he had moved and started a collaboration with Gino Coppedè, whose daughter he had married. In Rome, he also met Marcello Piacentini, with whom he began collaborating in 1926 on a competition, together with Angiolo Mazzoni, for the Palais of Nations in Geneva, winning the honorable mention. He was then invited by Piacentini to take part in the project for the University District of Rome (Città Universitaria).

Among his works, Rapisardi most notably designed the church of San Tommaso al Pantheon in Syracuse, the Palermo Courthouse, the Ciano Mausoleum in Livorno, the Pisa Courthouse, and the Basilica of San Giovanni Bosco in Rome. He often collaborated with his brother Ernesto, also an architect.

== Bibliography ==
- Barucci, Clementina; Falsetti, Marco (2022). Gaetano Rapisardi. Architetto 1893-1988. Rome: Campisano.
- Di Mauro, Eleonora (2023). Un sodalizio tra professione e disegno. I fratelli Gaetano ed Ernesto Rapisardi. University of Palermo.
- Ippoliti, Elena (2020). Il disegno per Gaetano Rapisardi. Progetti per Siracusa tra cronache e storia. FrancoAngeli.
