= Ernesto Rapisardi =

Italian architect

- Born: 14 February 1897; Syracuse, Sicily, Kingdom of Italy
- Died: 16 September 1972 (aged 75); Milan, Lombardy, Italy
- Education: University of Florence
- Occupations: Architect, civil engineer

Ernesto Rapisardi (14 February 1897 – 16 September 1972) was an Italian architect and engineer.

== Life and career ==
Born in Syracuse, Sicily, the younger brother of Gaetano Rapisardi, he attended the local Arts and Technical School and graduated from the Academy of Fine Arts of Rome in 1921. He registered with the Rome Architects' Order on 20 March 1928. Subsequently, he registered with the Milan Architects' Order on 15 September 1965.

In 1926, Rapisardi worked on the Villa Fogaccia in Rome, one of his earliest works. In the same period, he designed the interiors of the Casa Madre del Mutilato, by architect Marcello Piacentini. Starting from this point, Rapisardi entered into a productive collaboration with Piacentini, jointly designing numerous buildings in Rome and especially in Milan, including the Banca Agricola Milanese Building and the Palazzo INPS.

From 1932, he worked for eight years under Piacentini's guidance on the construction of the new Milan Courthouse, where he was responsible for both the external structure and the interior works. From 1950 to 1956, Rapisardi designed the Leonardo da Vinci High School in Milan, on the site of the former San Pietro in Gessate monastery.

Throughout his career, he also designed many buildings in collaboration with his brother Gaetano, most notably the Palermo Courthouse.

== Bibliography ==
- Di Mauro, Eleonora (2023). Un sodalizio tra professione e disegno. I fratelli Gaetano ed Ernesto Rapisardi. University of Palermo.
- Maria Luisa Neri, ed. (2012). L'altra modernità nella cultura architettonica del XX secolo. Gangemi.
