= El-Hakaneia Palace =

Building in Alexandria, Egypt

Coordinates: 31°12′29″N 29°56′54″E

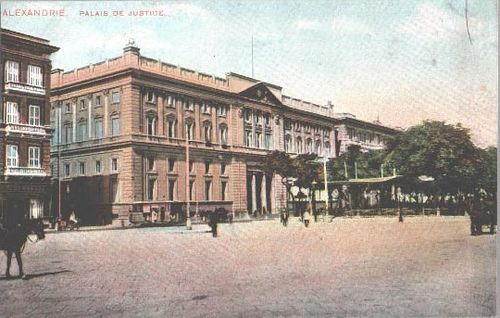
El-Hakaneia Palace

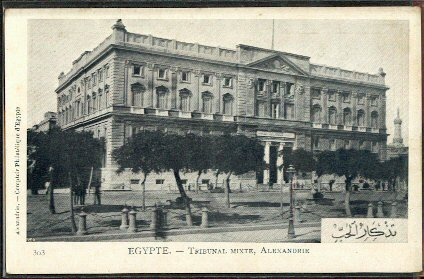
El-Hakaneia Palace

The El-Hakaneia palace at Manshieh Square in Alexandria is the seat of the Mixed Tribunals and it is still used as a court. The court building "Mixed Tribunals" was designed by Alfonso Maniscalco in the Beaux-Arts tradition in 1887.
