= Ivo Lambertini =

Italian architect and urban planner (1909–1990)

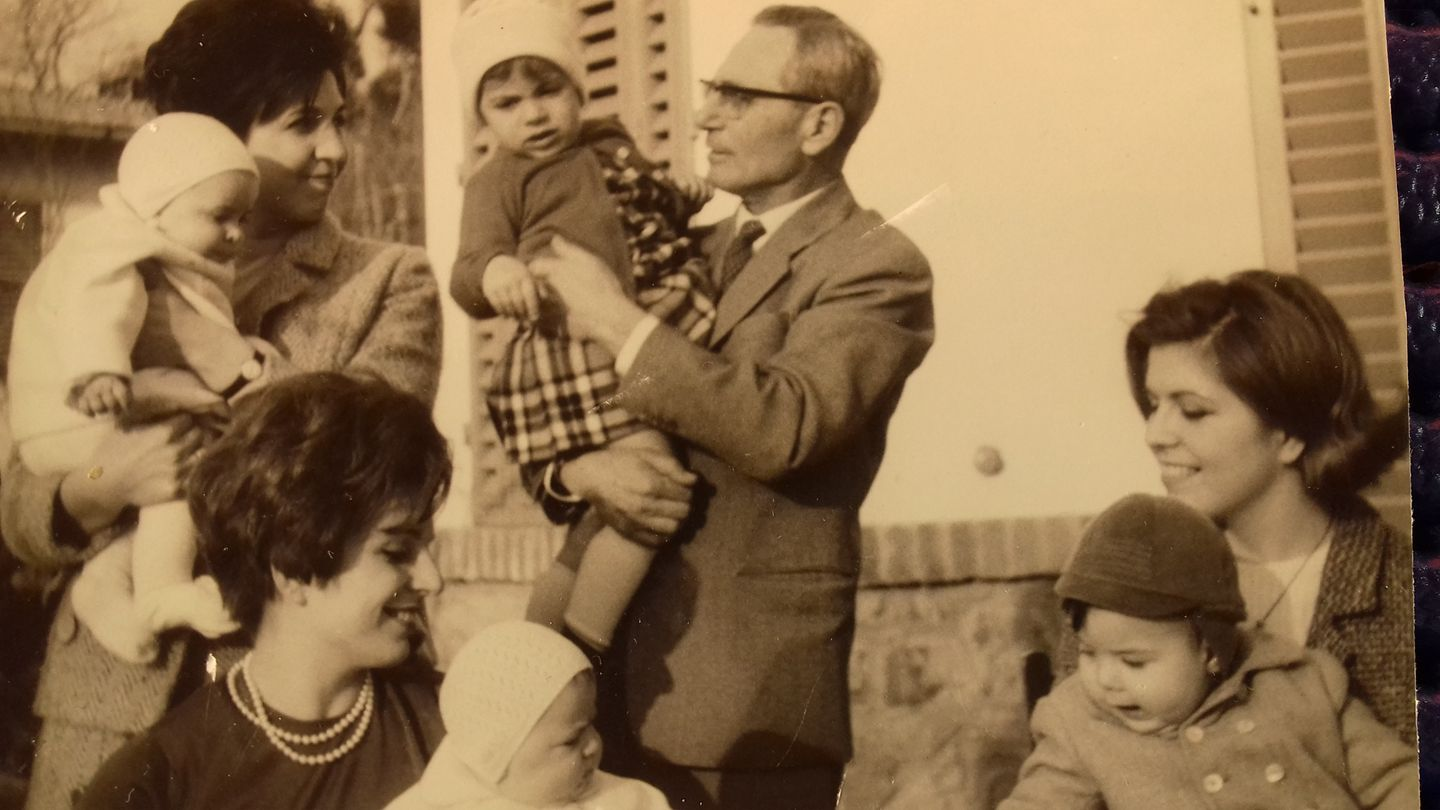
- Lambertini with his family
- Born: 30 March 1909; Syracuse, Kingdom of Italy
- Died: 15 April 1990 (aged 81); Florence, Italy
- Occupation: Architect

Ivo Lambertini (30 March 1909 – 15 April 1990) was an Italian architect and urban planner active in Tuscany and Albania in the 20th century.

== Life and career ==
Born in Syracuse, Lambertini studied in Modena and Bologna before enrolling at the Faculty of Architecture in Florence, graduating in 1934. He began his career under Raffaello Brizzi and contributed to the study of Brunelleschi's Dome and the modernization of the Teatro Comunale di Firenze.

From 1937 to 1943, he worked in Albania designing city plans for Tirana, Elbasan, and Korçë, restoring historic monuments, and constructing public buildings such as the Banco di Napoli in Tirana. He received the Order of Skanderbeg for his contributions.

After returning to Italy during World War II, Lambertini oversaw reconstruction projects in Tuscany, including churches, municipal buildings, schools, and urban plans. From 1948, he served as an architect and urban planner at the Public Works Department for Tuscany, acting as head of the Building Service and head of the Urban Planning Section, and from 1952 to 1954 he was appointed by the Ministry of Public Works to also direct the Urban Planning Section of Umbria. He retired in 1974.

Lambertini died in Florence in 1990.

== Selected works ==
Some of the most notable works of Lambertini include:

- Study and surveys of Brunelleschi's Dome, Florence (1935–1936)
- Modernization and restoration of the Teatro Comunale di Firenze, Florence (1935–1938)
- Casa del Fascio (later a municipal school), Lastra a Signa, Florence
- Urban planning projects for Viareggio and participation in the national competition for the master plan of Belluno
- City plans for Tirana, Elbasan, and Korçë, Albania (1937–1943)
- Banco di Napoli building, Tirana, Albania
- Istituto Poligrafico dello Stato, Tirana, Albania
- Restoration of historical mosques in Elbasan, Albania
- Reconstruction of churches in Tuscany after World War II, including:
  - San Bartolomeo, Prato
  - San Pietro a Galciana, Prato
  - San Rainieri, Guasticce

== Sources ==
- "Ivo Lambertini". Urbanisti italiani. Istituto Nazionale di Urbanistica. 1954. p. 180.
- Calace, Francesca, ed. (2012). "Restituiamo la Storia" – Dagli archivi ai territori. Architetture e modelli urbani nel Mediterraneo orientale. Rome: Gangemi.
- Cozzi, Mauro, ed. (2008). The Presence of Italian Architects in Mediterranean Countries. Proceedings of the First International Conference: Bibliotheca Alexandrina, Chatby, Alexandria, November 15th-16th 2007. M&m. pp. 287–292.
- De Luca, Giuseppe (2001). Pianificazione e programmazione. La questione urbanistica in Toscana: 1970-1995. Florence: Alinea.
- Fantozzi Micali, Osanna (2006). Piani di ricostruzione e città storiche. 1945-1955. Florence: Alinea.
- Insabato, Elisabetta; Ghelli, Cecilia (2007). Guida agli archivi di architetti e ingegneri del Novecento in Toscana. Florence: Edifir.
