= Old Ipswich Courthouse =

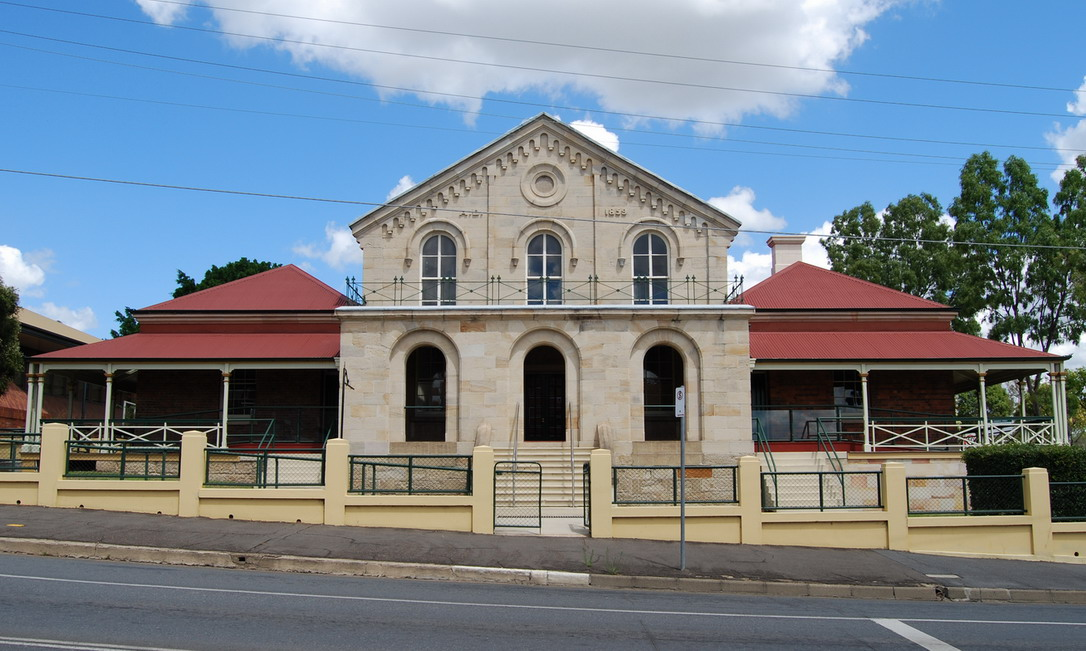
- Ipswich Courthouse, 2009

- Location within Queensland
- 27.6178°S 152.7597°E
- Location: 75 East Street, Ipswich, City of Ipswich, Queensland, Australia

History
- Design period: 1840s–1860s (mid-19th century)
- Built: 1859–1936

Site notes
- Architect: Charles Tiffin
- Architectural style: Romanesque

Queensland Heritage Register
- Official name: Ipswich Court House, Now known as Old Court House
- Type: state heritage (built)
- Designated: 21 October 1992
- Reference no.: 600575
- Significant period: 1850s–1860s (historical); 1859–1860s (fabric 1859 section); 1930s (fabric extension 1936)
- Significant components: court house

The Old Ipswich Courthouse is a heritage-listed former courthouse located at 73–75 East Street, Ipswich, City of Ipswich, Queensland, Australia. It was designed by Charles Tiffin and built from 1859. It was added to the Queensland Heritage Register on 21 October 1992.

== History ==
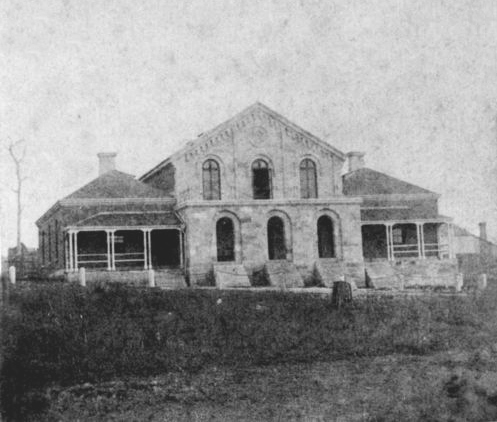
Original Ipswich Courthouse, circa 1860

The Old Ipswich Courthouse is a sandstone and brick single-storey building, the original section of which was completed in 1859 to a design by Charles Tiffin. The courthouse was the earliest major Queensland work of Tiffin, who was Clerk of Works for Moreton Bay, and became the first Queensland Colonial Architect. In the early years of Ipswich, the building was used for public meetings as well as a courthouse. The original building consisted of the central sandstone courtroom with a vestibule at the front, flanked by two brick wings.

When Queensland separated from New South Wales, the Queensland Government inherited the costs of the building, which led to ongoing disputes between the two colonies.

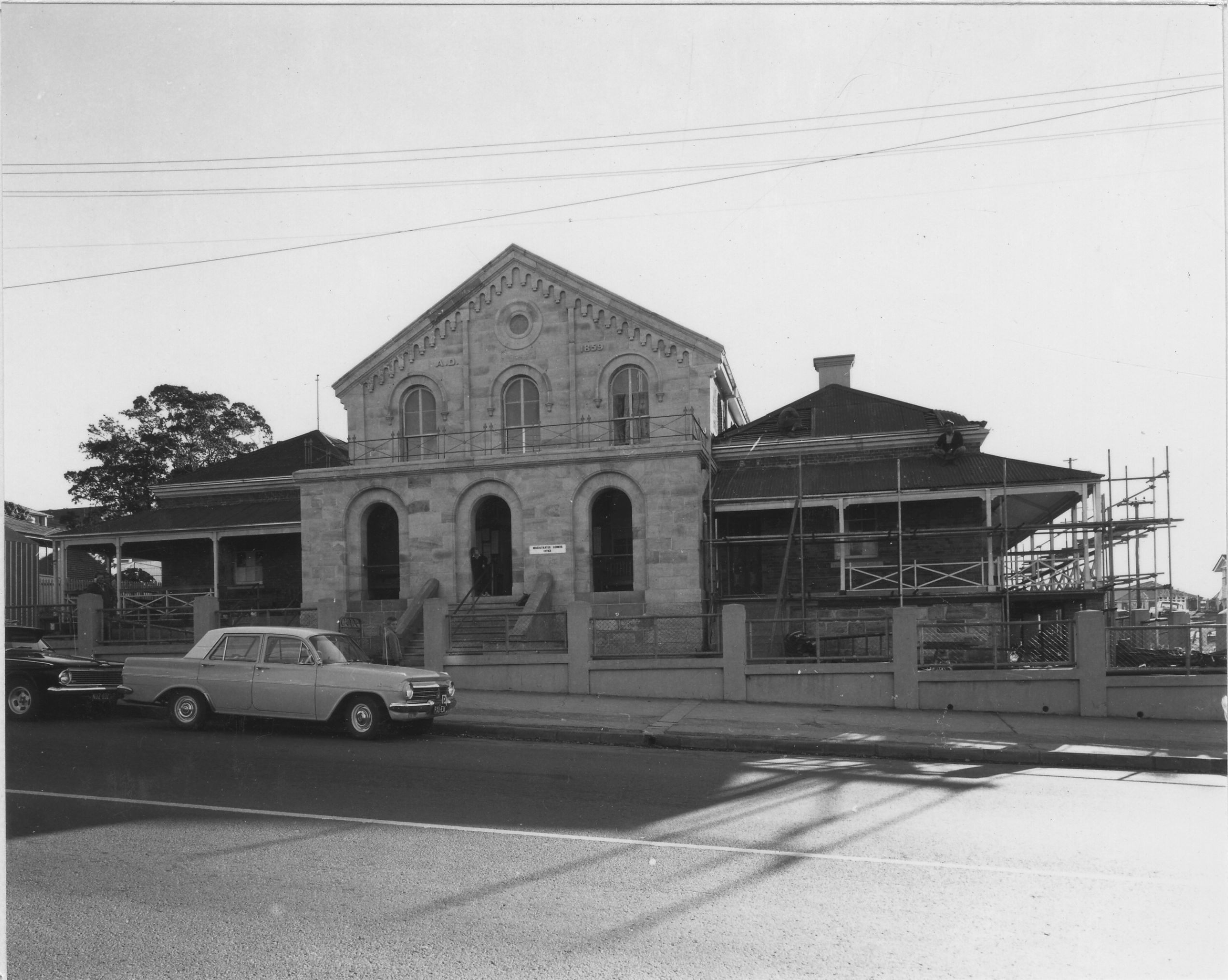
Restoration work, July 1974

The building was too small for its task by 1904. In 1936, a major extension in rendered brickwork was made to the west, adding a new court room and ancillary rooms with the entry off Ginn St. With this addition, the building was able to continue its function until a new courthouse was built on a different site in 1982. The Queensland Government carried out conservation work in the 1970s and 1980s. After the building ceased being used as a courthouse, the bench was moved to the original court room and the building became a community cultural centre.

It is a rare example of a government building constructed in Queensland prior to separation from New South Wales. At the time of separation, the debt on the building was inherited by the Queensland Government which led to an ongoing dispute with the New South Wales Government.

There have been two subsequent Ipswich Courthouses.

== Description ==
The Old Ipswich Courthouse is a single-storey sandstone and brick Romanesque building. The interior of the original courtroom (Court Room 1) is divided internally into four bays. The early bench is at the western end of the courtroom. The side wings of the 1859 section are of facebrick and are each divided into three separate rooms. The 1936 section is to the west of the original sandstone section. This section is in brick with ruled joint render, and includes a large room (Court Room 2) and several smaller rooms. Court Room 2 is also divided into four main bays. The western facade is of simple Revival Classic design. The building is surrounded on three sides by a rendered brick fence with rendered brick piers and pipe and chainwire infill.

== Heritage listing ==
The Old Ipswich Courthouse was listed on the Queensland Heritage Register on 21 October 1992 having satisfied the following criteria.

The place is important in demonstrating the evolution or pattern of Queensland's history.

The size and quality of the building demonstrate the importance of Ipswich as a major centre at this time.

The place demonstrates rare, uncommon or endangered aspects of Queensland's cultural heritage.

Completed in 1859, the courthouse is a rare example of a government building constructed in Queensland prior to Separation.

The place is important in demonstrating the principal characteristics of a particular class of cultural places.

It still contains early bench and court fittings and is important in demonstrating the principal characteristics of an early courthouse.

The place is important because of its aesthetic significance.

An unusual Romanesque building of sandstone and brick, it exhibits aesthetic characteristics valued by the community and is a landmark on a major intersection. It contributes to a precinct of historic buildings on the edge of the Ipswich CBD.

The place has a strong or special association with a particular community or cultural group for social, cultural or spiritual reasons.

It is closely associated with the Ipswich community as the main courthouse for the district from 1859 to 1982, and also as a venue for early public meetings.

The place has a special association with the life or work of a particular person, group or organisation of importance in Queensland's history.

It is the earliest major Queensland work of architect Charles Tiffin, at that time Clerk of Works for Moreton Bay and later the first Queensland Colonial Architect.
