= Ipswich Courthouse =

Courthouse in Ipswich, Queensland, Australia

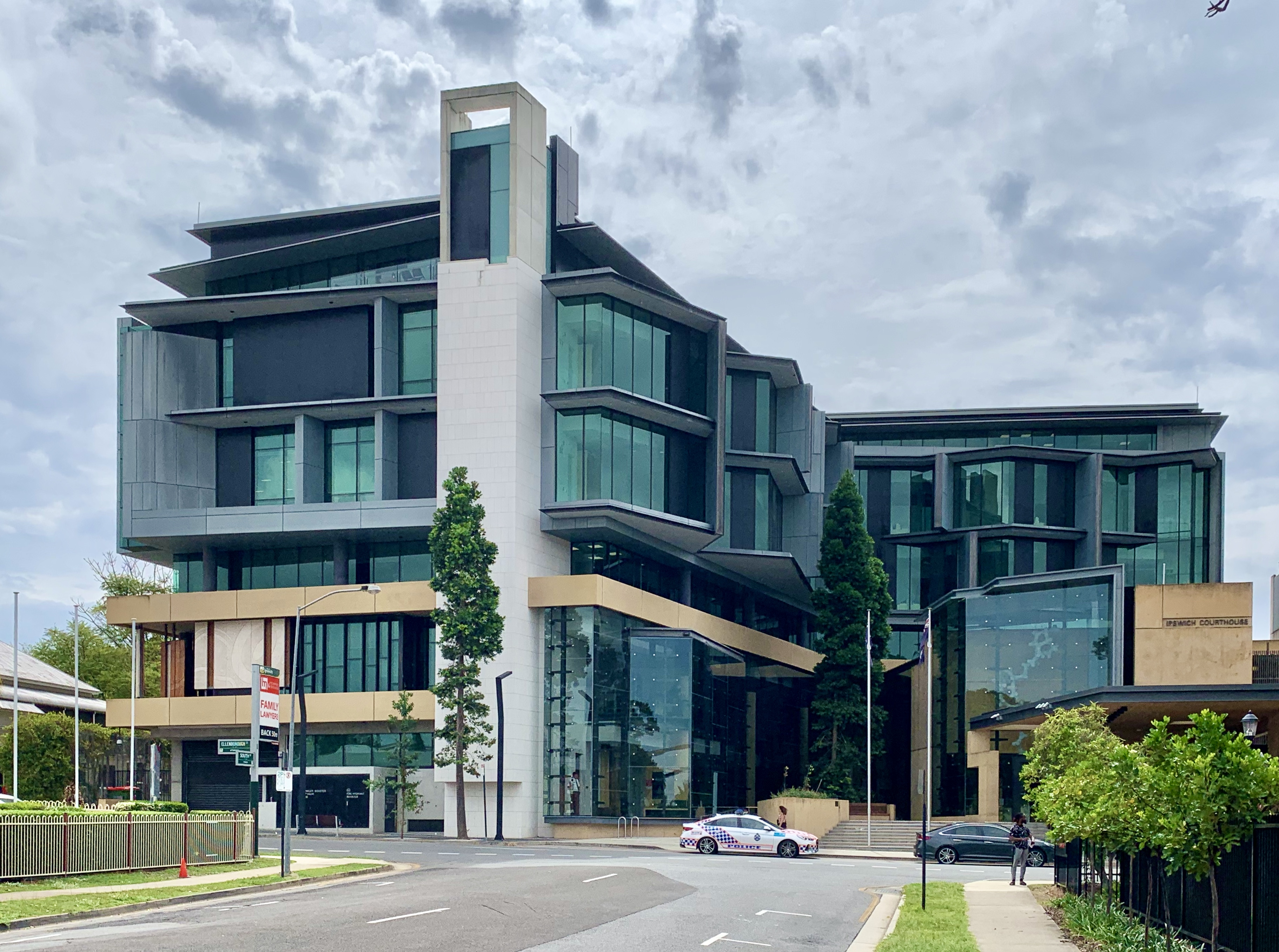
- Ipswich Courthouse
- Interactive map of the Ipswich Courthouse area

General information
- Status: Completed
- Type: Courthouse
- Architectural style: Modernist
- Location: 43 Ellenborough Street, Ipswich, Queensland, Australia
- Current tenants: Department of Justice and Attorney-General (Queensland)
- Estimated completion: 2010
- Cost: AUD$92 million
- Owner: Queensland Government

Technical details
- Floor count: 5

Design and construction
- Architects: Ainsley Bell Murchison (ABM) Architects and Cox Rayner Architects
- Main contractor: Jensen Bowers

References
- Ipswich Courthouse

The Ipswich Courthouse is located at 43 Ellenborough Street, Ipswich, Queensland, Australia. The five-storey complex houses magistrates court and support facilities, police prosecutions offices and a fully operational watch house. It was opened in 2009/2010.

This is the third courthouse for the city and replaced the second courthouse located in East Street, Ipswich that had been constructed in 1982. The first courthouse still exists at 73–75 East Street and is heritage-listed.

The new courthouse features:

- eight magistrates courtrooms
- three district courtrooms
- a large public waiting area
- fully integrated AV systems including videoconferencing facilities
- vulnerable witness suites and evidence pre-recording facilities

The building was designed by Ainsley Bell Murchison (ABM) Architects and Cox Rayner Architects.

== Awards ==
The courthouse has received the following awards:

- FDG Stanley Award for Public Architecture, AIA QLD 2010
- GHM Addison Award for Interior Architecture, AIA QLD 2010
- State Award for Art & Architecture, AIA QLD 2010
