= Palermo Courthouse =

Judiciary building in Palermo, Italy

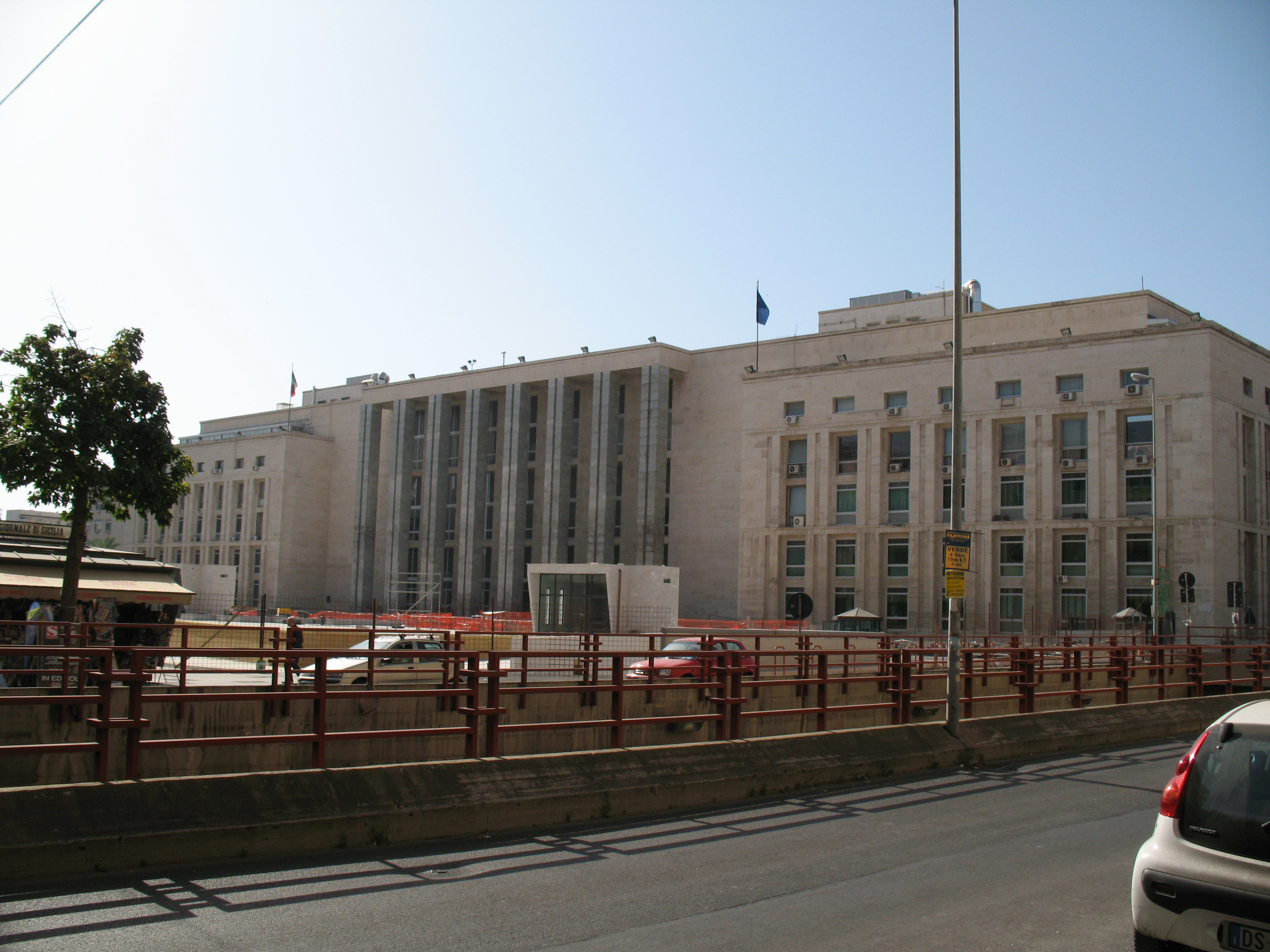
- Interactive map of the Palermo Courthouse area

General information
- Architectural style: Rationalism
- Location: Palermo, Sicily, Italy
- Coordinates: 38°7′7.11″N 13°21′7.1″E
- Construction started: 1938
- Completed: 1957

Design and construction
- Architects: Ernesto Rapisardi, Gaetano Rapisardi

The Palermo Courthouse (Italian: Palazzo di Giustizia di Palermo, lit. 'Palace of Justice of Palermo') is a judicial complex located in Il Capo neighborhood of Palermo, Italy.

== History ==
The building was designed by architects Ernesto and Gaetano Rapisardi. Construction began in 1938, but was halted shortly after due to World War II. Work resumed after the war, in the early 1950s, and was completed in 1957. Over the years, the building has been enriched with works of art by various artists, such as Luigi Venturini and Vincenzo Gennaro.

In 2004, a second architectural complex, designed by architect Sebastiano Monaco, was built next to the main building.

== Sources ==
- Il nuovo Palazzo di Giustizia di Palermo. Sellerio. 2004.
- Gaetano Blandi (1998). Palermo: storia dello sviluppo urbanistico della città dalle origini all'età contemporanea. Axon. pp. 206–219.
- Margherita De Simone (1987). Palermo: architettura tra le due guerre (1918-1939). Flaccovio. p. 263.
- Di Mauro, Eleonora (2023). Un sodalizio tra professione e disegno. I fratelli Gaetano ed Ernesto Rapisardi. University of Palermo.
