= Milan Courthouse =

Judiciary building in Milan, Italy

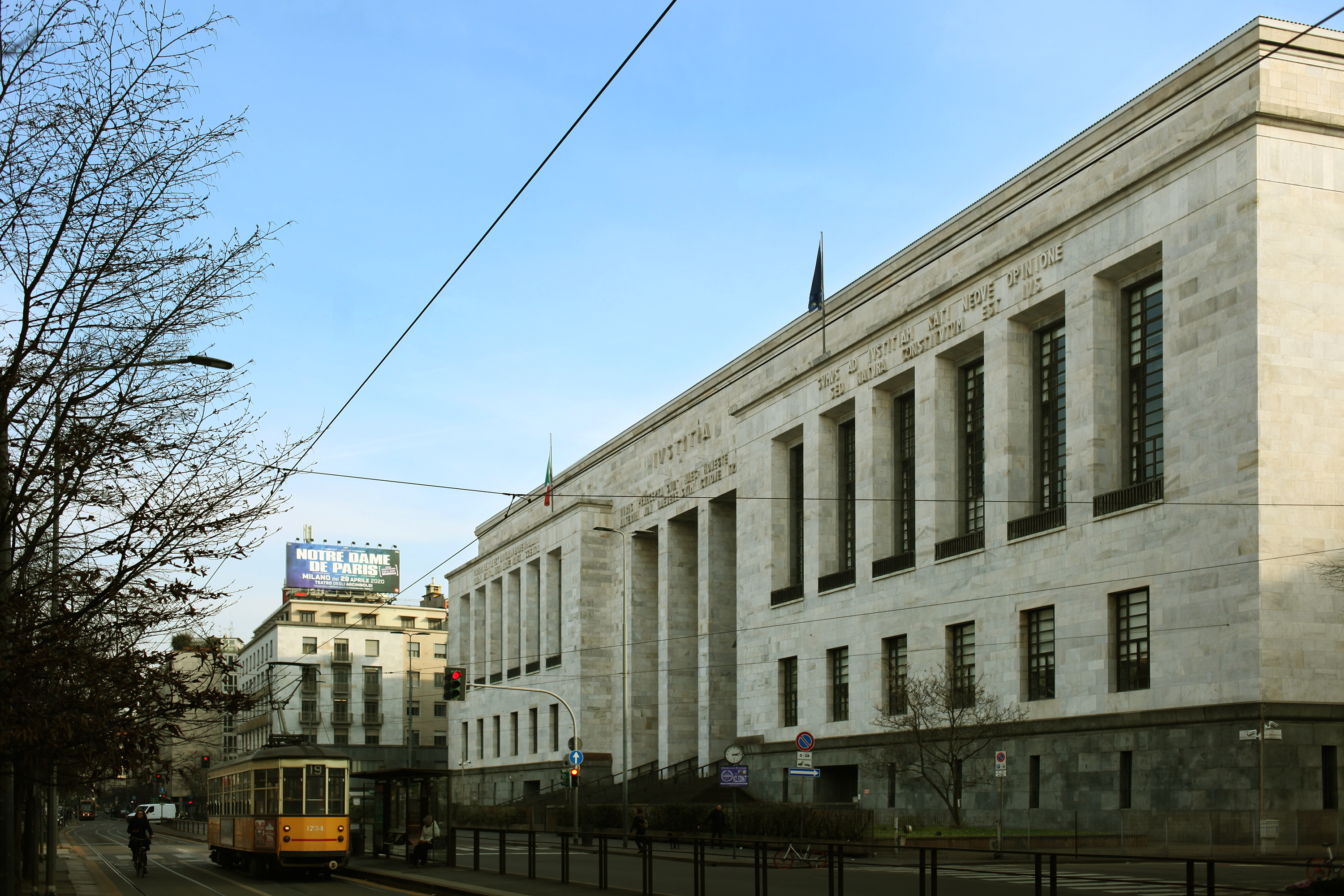
- Interactive map of the Milan Courthouse area

General information
- Location: Milan, Lombardy, Italy
- Coordinates: 45°27′41.3″N 9°12′04.9″E
- Construction started: 1932
- Completed: 1940
- Opening: July 1940; 85 years ago

Design and construction
- Architects: Marcello Piacentini, Ernesto Rapisardi

The Milan Courthouse (Italian: Palazzo di Giustizia di Milano, lit. 'Palace of Justice of Milan') is a judicial complex located in the Porta Vittoria district of Milan, Italy.

== History ==
The concept of constructing a new courthouse in Porta Vittoria to replace the seven small and outdated judicial offices then existing in Milan was initially proposed in 1925. In 1931, architect Marcello Piacentini was appointed to oversee the project. In collaboration with architect Ernesto Rapisardi, Piacentini designed and supervised the construction of the new courthouse, which was ultimated in July 1940.

== Description ==
The building is an imposing structure situated on a centrally located site, conceived as a unified edifice housing three distinct judicial institutions: the Court of Appeal (Corte d'Appello), the Court (Tribunale), and the Magistrates Court (Pretura). At the southwest corner stands a tower rising 61 meters high, originally intended to house the Archive.

Constructed predominantly with reinforced concrete, the courthouse's interior features decorative elements crafted from precious stones and marble. While the exterior of the building presents a restrained and somewhat austere appearance, the interior is richly adorned with artistic embellishments, including bas-reliefs, mosaics, frescoes, and sculptures. These decorative works were realized by various prominent artists, notably Mario Sironi, Fausto Melotti, Carlo Carrà, Romano Romanelli, Achille Funi, and Arturo Dazzi.

== Sources ==
- F. Irace (1999). Milano. Guida d'archittettura. Turin. p. 215.
