= Palazzo Missori =

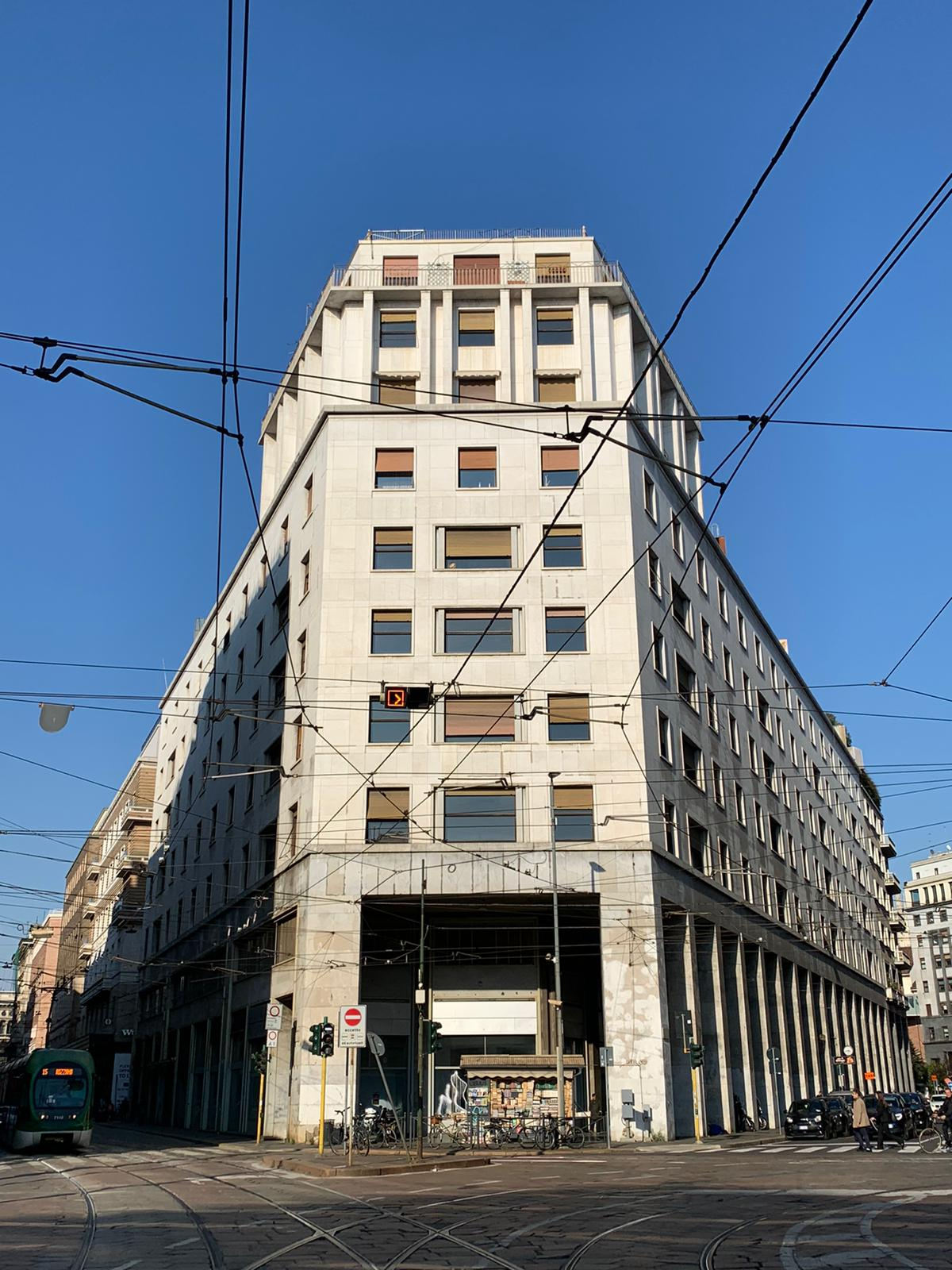
- Palazzo Missori in 2021
- Click on the map for a fullscreen view

General information
- Location: Milan, Italy
- Coordinates: 45°27′41.55″N 9°11′19.29″E

Palazzo Missori is a historic building located in Milan, Italy.

== History ==
The building, designed by architect Marcello Piacentini, was erected between 1933 and 1938. To make its construction possible, the old Cinema Reale building that stood on the site was demolished. In 2017 the property was purchased by the Gamma Immobiliare fund, subscribed almost entirely by INPS and managed by DeA Capital Real Estate SGR, which subsequently promoted its redevelopment according to a project drawn up by the architecture firm Park Associati.

== Description ==
The building occupies a corner lot overlooking Piazza Missori in Milan's CBD.

The building is in the Italian Rationalist style. The façades are divided horizontally into three sections, differing in form and materials. The first, corresponding to the base of the building, consists of a monumental double-height portico running along two of the three fronts (on the third, along Via Mazzini, the shop windows instead line up with the street). Behind the portico is a series of shops with mezzanines, enclosed by glass walls at ground-floor level. The second section, corresponding to the five intermediate floors, is characterized by a single smooth, uniform façade of light-colored marble, in which an orderly series of sash windows is set. The third section, finally, consists of a stepped attic floor on the fronts facing Via Mazzini and Via Gonzaga, while it rises over three storeys on the side overlooking Piazza Missori with two of them marked by pilasters supporting the slight overhang of the terrace around the top floor.

== Gallery ==
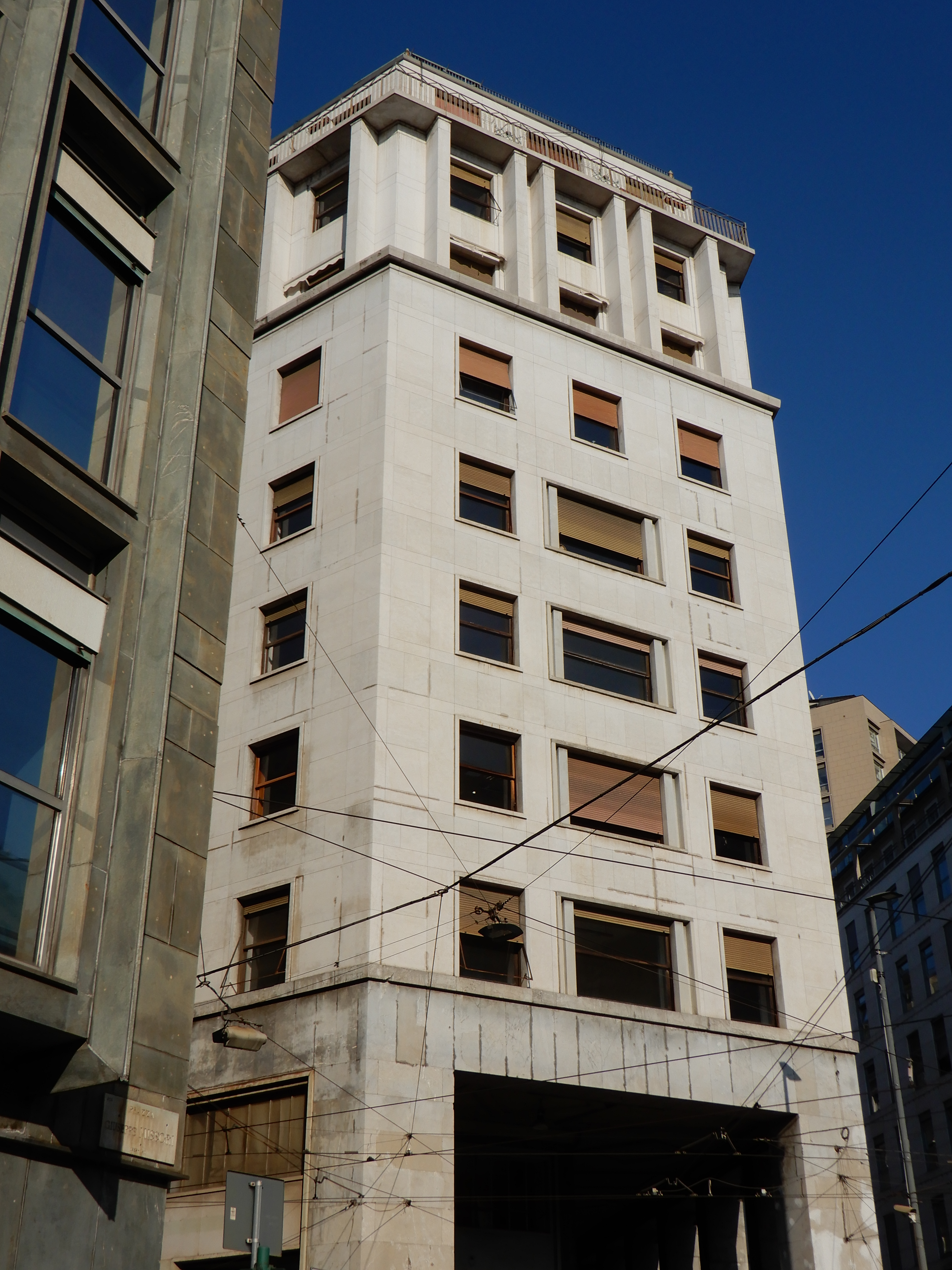

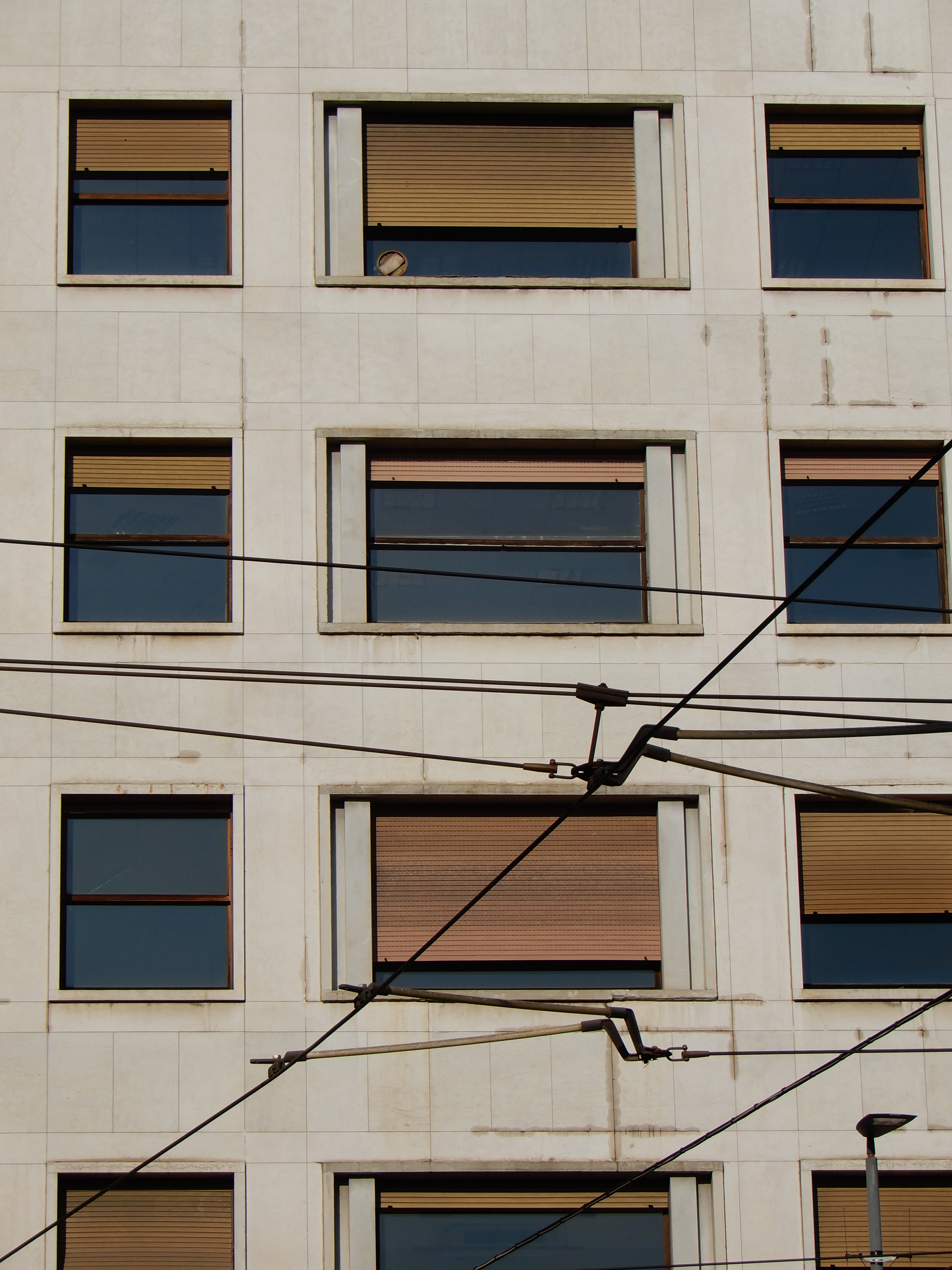

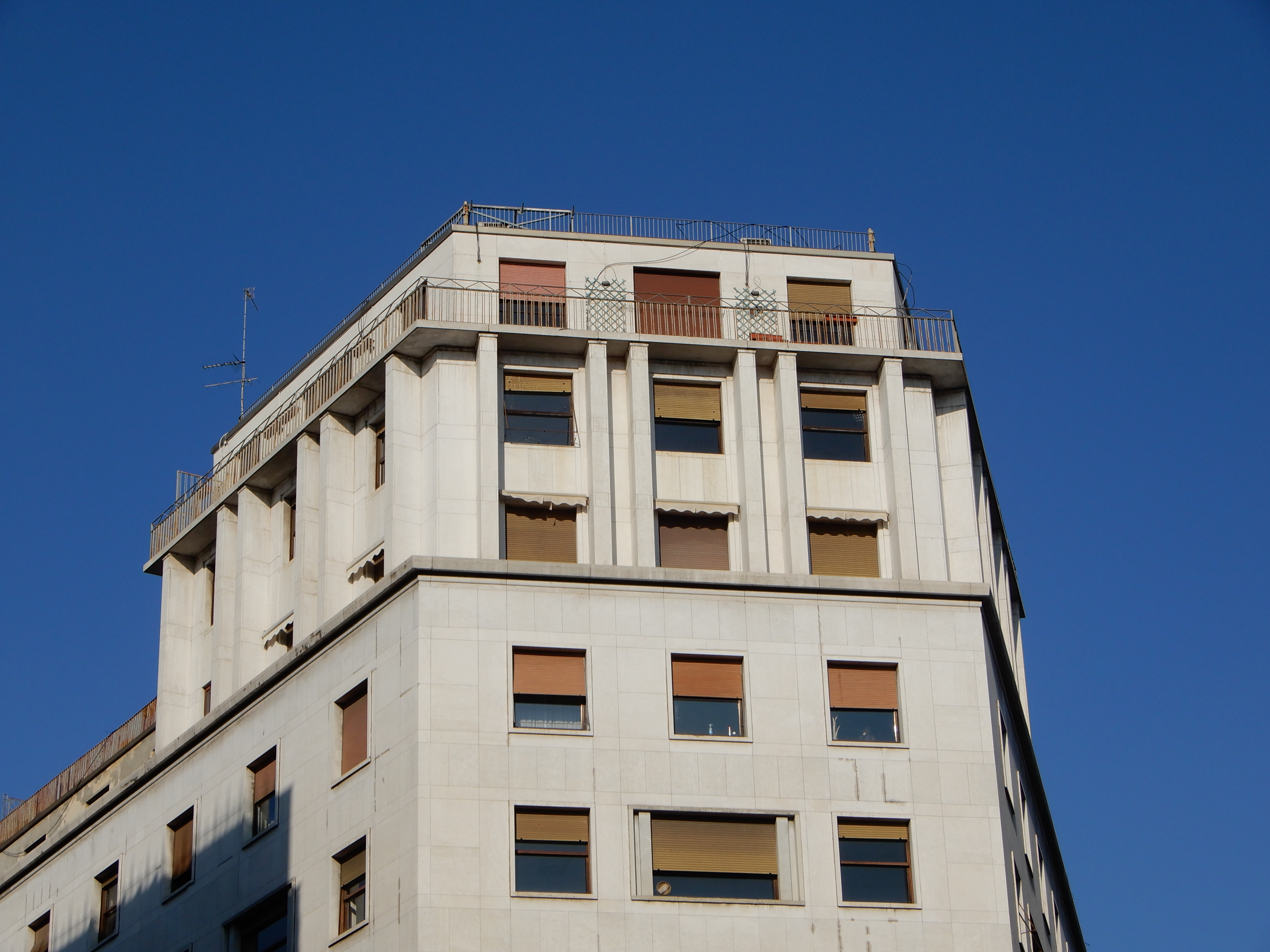
