= Courthouse (Ljubljana) =

Coordinates: 46°3′18.11″N 14°30′24.37″E

- Sodna palača, Ljubljana (in Slovene)
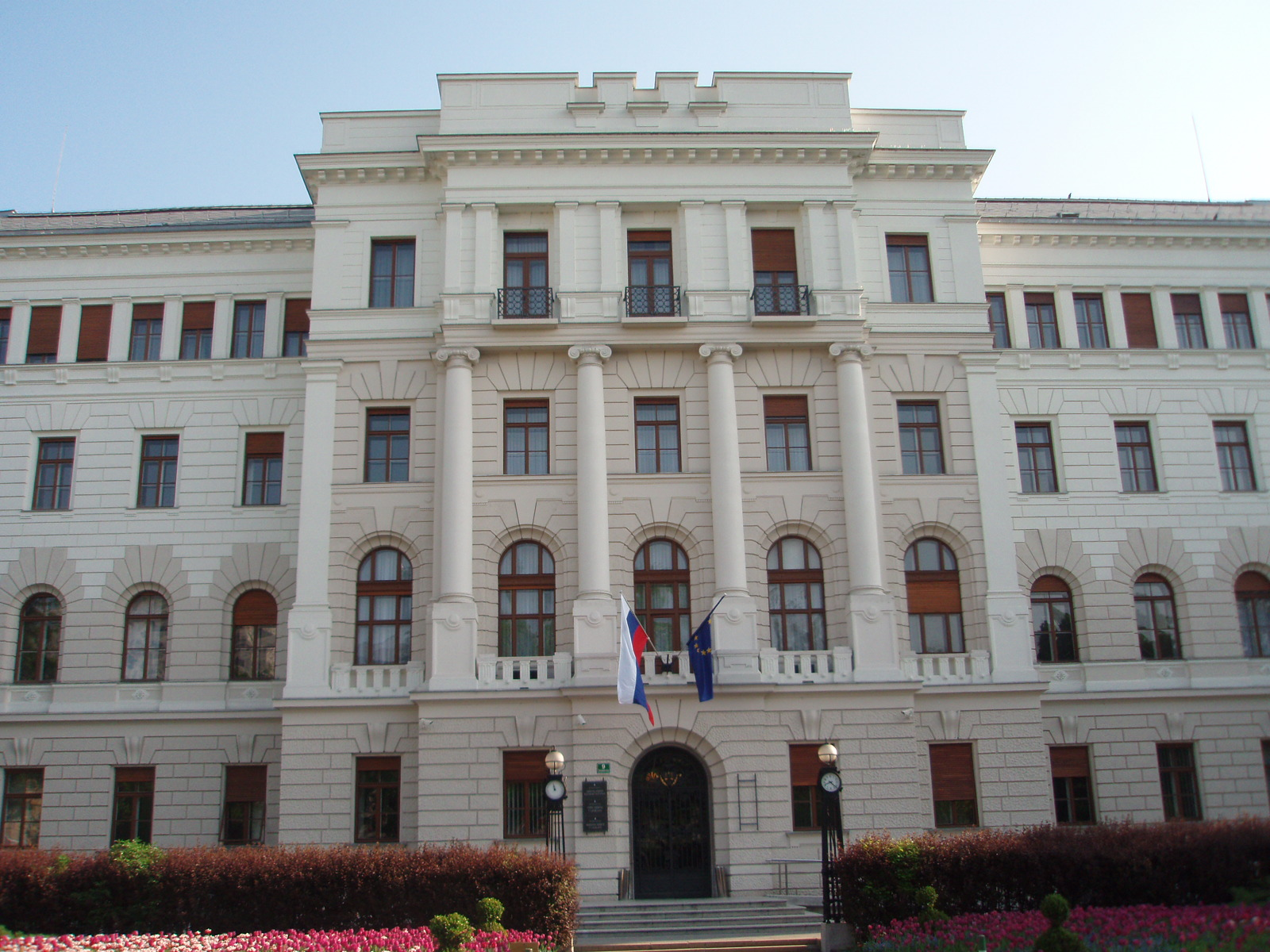

General information
- Location: Ljubljana, Slovenia

The Courthouse (Slovene: Sodna palača) in Ljubljana, the capital of Slovenia, is a 19th-century building in the central district of the city that has for many years served as the seat of various regional courts of law.

The Courthouse was built after the earthquake in 1895 and it was renovated in the early 1950s. In the late 1940s, it was used for the show trials against opponents of the Yugoslav Titoist regime in the Socialist Republic of Slovenia. The most famous were the so-called Rožman trial in 1945, the Nagode trial in 1946 and the Dachau trials in 1947.

The courthouse underwent an extensive renovation in 2007 and 2008. In 2008, Slovenian Minister of Justice Lovro Šturm announced that in three years time most of the courts of law housed in the building would move to new headquarters near the Ljubljana railway station.
