= Franco Marescotti =

Italian architect and urban planner (1908–1991)

- Born: Francesco Marescotti; 10 January 1908; Pesaro, Kingdom of Italy
- Died: 12 June 1991 (aged 83); San Gregorio di Catania, Sicily, Italy
- Occupations: Architect, designer, urban planner

Franco Marescotti (10 January 1908 – 12 June 1991) was an Italian architect, designer, urban planner and academic, associated with the Italian rationalist movement. He worked with Giuseppe Pagano and the journal Casabella, contributing to the debate on modern architecture and social housing.

== Life and career ==
Born in Pesaro in 1908, Marescotti studied at an agricultural institute before moving to Rome, where he briefly worked in the practice of architect Armando Brasini. In 1934 he moved to Milan and founded the architectural firm "Diotallevi e Marescotti" with engineer Irenio Diotallevi. There he developed a close collaboration with Giuseppe Pagano and the journal Casabella, contributing to debates on modern architecture, standardization and prefabrication.

Together with Diotallevi and Pagano, Marescotti developed the concept of the "house of the man" (casa dell'uomo), focusing on social housing as a fundamental element of urban development. Their project "horizontal city" (città orizzontale, 1940) proposed a low-rise residential model integrating housing, services and public spaces, anticipating later approaches to community planning and social housing.

After World War II, Marescotti continued his research on collective housing and cooperative architecture. He designed projects for workers' housing and social centres in the Milan metropolitan area, including the Grandi e Bertacchi Cooperative Social Centre (1951–1953) and the Lampugnano Cooperative Social Centre (1953–1955). Together with Franco Albini, Pasquale Carbonara, Carlo Ceccucci, Vittorio Gandolfi, and Ignazio Gardella, he contributed to the IACP Mangiagalli II housing complex (1946–1950). Between 1950 and 1953, he also worked on the INA-Casa housing districts of Baggio I (with Albini) and Baggio II (with Ezio Cerutti, Aldo Putelli and Ceccucci).

Marescotti also wrote extensively on housing and urban issues, publishing works such as Ordine e destino della casa popolare (1941, with Diotallevi) and Il problema sociale, costruttivo ed economico dell'abitazione (1948–1950). He later taught architectural design at the University of Catania (1971–1978). He died in San Gregorio di Catania in 1991.
