= Carlo Ceccucci =

Italian architect (1908–2005)

- Born: 6 March 1908; Bastia Umbra, Province of Perugia, Kingdom of Italy
- Died: 27 June 2005 (aged 97); Castelnuovo di Porto, Lazio, Italy
- Education: Sapienza University of Rome
- Occupation: Architect

Carlo Ceccucci (6 March 1908 – 27 June 2005) was an Italian architect, known for his work in social housing and post-war urban development in the Milan metropolitan area.

== Life and career ==
Born in Bastia Umbra in 1908, Ceccucci graduated in architecture in Rome in 1935. After moving to Milan, he collaborated with several important architects, including Eugenio Faludi, Enrico Agostino Griffini, Gio Ponti, Giovanni Muzio and Mario Bacciocchi.

In 1945 he founded the Studio Sociale di Architettura with Irenio Diotallevi and Franco Marescotti, a collective focused mainly on public and cooperative housing. The studio played an important role in the development of post-war social housing in the Milan area, designing residential districts for institutions such as IACP and INA-Casa.

Ceccucci also worked with housing cooperatives, designing community facilities and residential buildings. His work was characterized by attention to collective life, affordable housing and the relationship between architecture and social needs.

He died on 27 June 2005.

== Selected works ==
- IACP Mangiagalli II housing district, Milan (1949, with Franco Albini, Pasquale Carbonara, Vittorio Gandolfi, Ignazio Gardella and Franco Marescotti)
- Castellina housing district, Monza (1949, with Irenio Diotallevi and Marescotti)
- INA-Casa Baggio II housing district, Milan (1950–1953, with Ezio Cerutti, Aldo Putelli and Marescotti)
- INA-Casa Pirelli housing district, Cinisello Balsamo (1951)
- Centro Sociale Cooperativo Grandi e Bertacchi, Milan (1951–1955, with Diotallevi and Marescotti)
- Residential building in Via Pellegrino Rossi, Milan (1954–1956)
- Retirement home in Fasano del Garda, Gardone Riviera (1956–1959)
- Villetta Ceccucci, Deiva Marina (1959)
- Villaggio La Francesca, Bonassola (1960)
- Condominio La Marina, Deiva Marina (1962)

== Sources ==
- Ciagà, Graziella Leyla (2003). Gli archivi di architettura in Lombardia. Censimento delle fonti. Milan: Centro di Alti Studi sulle Arti Visive.
- Ciucci, Giorgio; Casciato, Maristella (1980). Franco Marescotti e la casa civile: 1934-1956. Rome: Officina.
- Gramigna, Giuliana; Mazza, Sergio (2001). Milano. Un secolo di architettura milanese dal Cordusio alla Bicocca. Milan: Hoepli.
- Grandi, Maurizio; Pracchi, Attilio (1998). Milano. Guida all'architettura moderna. Bologna: Zanichelli.
