= Vittoriano Viganò =

Italian architect and designer (1919–1996)

- Born: 14 December 1919; Milan, Kingdom of Italy
- Died: 5 January 1996 (aged 76); Milan, Italy
- Education: Polytechnic University of Milan
- Occupations: Architect, designer, academic

Vittoriano Viganò (14 December 1919 – 5 January 1996) was an Italian architect, designer, and academic associated with the postwar development of modern architecture in Italy. He is best known for the Marchiondi Spagliardi Institute in Milan, regarded as one of the country's most significant examples of New Brutalism.

== Life and career ==
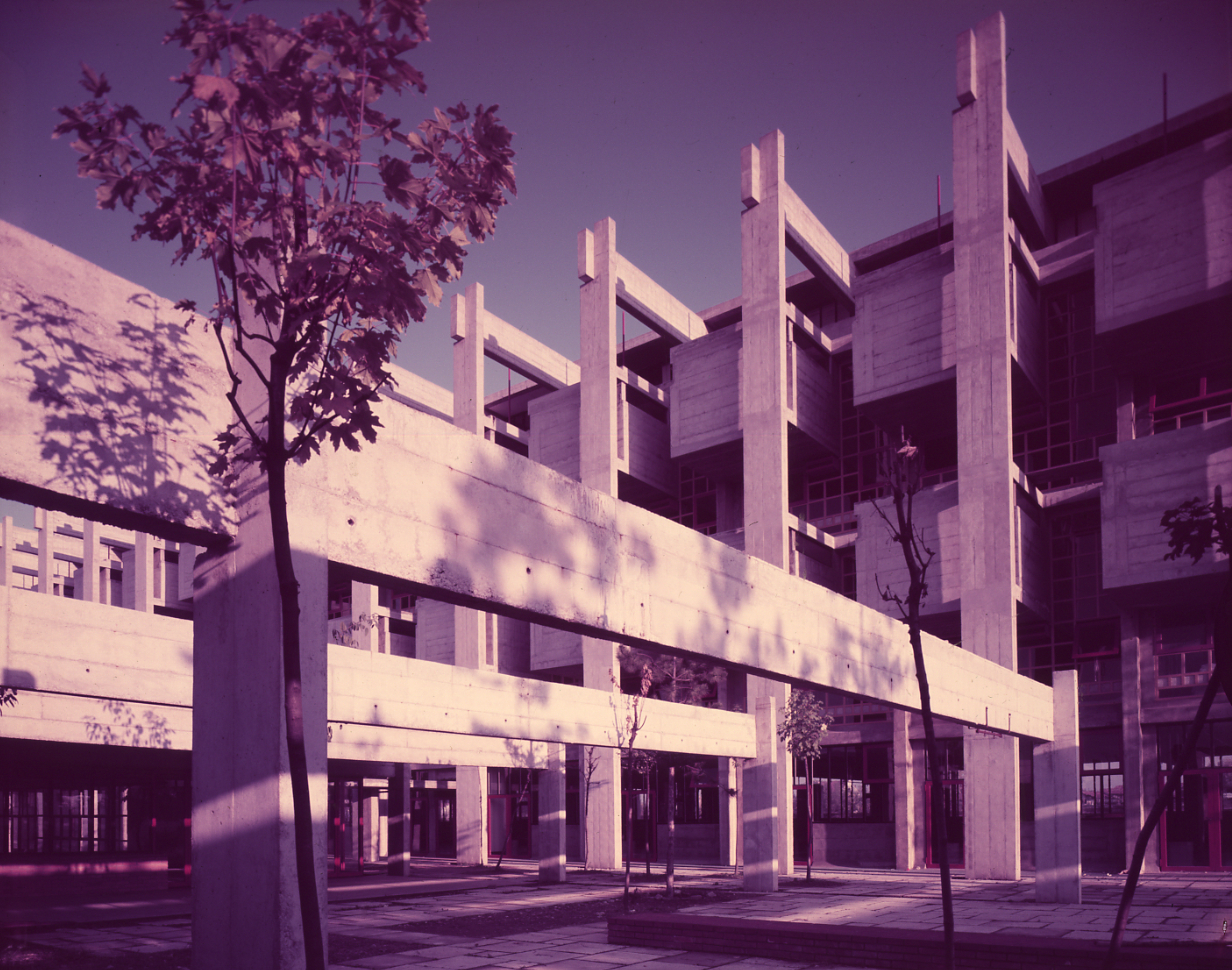
The Marchiondi Spagliardi Institute, photographed by Paolo Monti in 1975

Born in Milan, Viganò graduated in architecture from the Polytechnic University of Milan in 1944. After the World War II he trained under BBPR, Gio Ponti and Arturo Danusso, later establishing his own architectural practice in 1947.

Viganò taught at the Polytechnic University of Milan, where he was associated with Gio Ponti's chair of interior architecture before becoming professor of interior architecture and architectural design in 1979. He also contributed to architectural criticism as the Italian correspondent for the French journal L'Architecture d'Aujourd'hui by André Bloc.

Among his best-known works are the housing for war veterans in the QT8 district (1947, with Ezio Cerutti, Aldo Putelli and Vittorio Gandolfi), the Marchiondi Spagliardi Institute (1957), the Casa "La scala" in Portese, on Lake Garda (1958), the redevelopment plans for Parco Sempione, and the extension of the Faculty of Architecture of the Polytechnic University (1985).

He was active in several professional organizations, including the Istituto Nazionale di Urbanistica (INU), the Associazione per il Disegno Industriale (ADI), and the Accademia di San Luca. In 1991 he received the President of the Republic Prize for Architecture.

== Sources ==
- A come architettura. Vittoriano Viganò (Exhibition catalogue). Milan: Electa. 1992.
- V. Viganò, ed. (1994). Vittoriano Viganò. Una ricerca e un segno in architettura (Exhibition catalogue). Milan: Electa.
- Stocchi, Alessandro (1999). Vittoriano Viganò. Etica brutalista. Turin: Testo & Immagine.
- Graf, Franz; Tedeschi, Letizia, eds. (2009). L'Istituto Marchiondi Spagliardi di Vittoriano Viganò. Mendrisio: Mendrisio Academy Press.
