= Palazzo della Banca Lombarda =

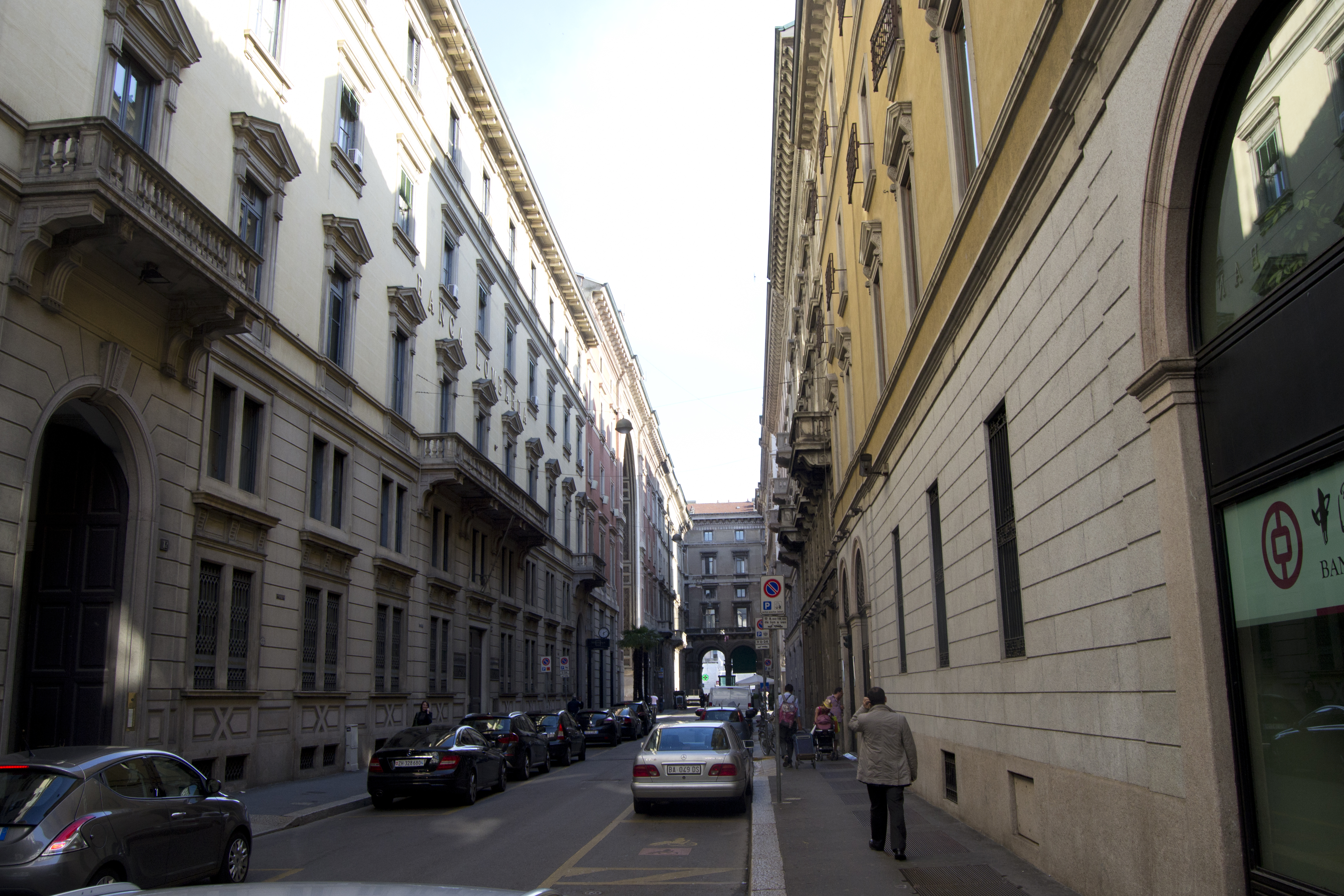
- The Palazzo della Banca Lombarda, on the left, in 2012
- Click on the map for a fullscreen view

General information
- Location: Milan, Italy
- Coordinates: 45°27′58.09″N 9°11′21.75″E

The Palazzo della Banca Lombarda is a historic building located in Milan, Italy.

== History ==
The building was constructed to house the headquarters of Banca Lombarda in the years following the Unification of Italy. The construction works, part of a broader urban renewal plan for the Duomo area of Milan, began in 1874 based on a design by engineer Luigi Robecchi. Subsequently, the building served for many years as the offices of UBI Banca.

In 2020, the building was sold by UBI Banca to vehicles managed by the Milan-based real estate company COIMA, as part of a broader initiative to streamline the bank's real estate portfolio. This operation involved the sale of several buildings in central Milan and the consolidation of its offices in the city into a single property, the Gioia 22 Tower. In 2025, the building is undergoing renovation and enhancement works by COIMA.

== Description ==
The building, located in the centre of Milan next to the Galleria Vittorio Emanuele II, features an eclectic architecture with Renaissance Revival elements.

For a long time, a sculpture by Sol LeWitt was placed in the building lobby.
