= Irenio Diotallevi =

Italian architect and engineer (1909–1954)

- Born: 10 January 1909; Voltri, Province of Genoa, Kingdom of Italy
- Died: 22 April 1954 (aged 45); Milan, Italy
- Education: Sapienza University of Rome; Polytechnic University of Milan
- Occupations: Architect, engineer

Irenio Diotallevi (10 January 1909 – 22 April 1954) was an Italian architect and engineer, known for his contribution to Rationalist architecture and for his research on social housing.

== Life and career ==
Born in Voltri, Genoa, to naval engineer Ariosto, Diotallevi graduated in engineering from the Sapienza University of Rome in 1932 and later obtained a degree in architecture from the Polytechnic University of Milan in 1935. During his studies he began a long professional collaboration with architect Franco Marescotti, with whom he founded the firm "Diotallevi e Marescotti" in 1934.

Influenced by German Rationalism and the works of Walter Gropius and Ludwig Hilberseimer, Diotallevi developed with Marescotti a functional approach focused on housing typology and collective living. Their collaboration with Giuseppe Pagano and the magazine Casabella led to important studies on popular housing, including the theoretical project of the "horizontal city" (città orizzontale, 1940), a model of low-rise residential planning based on the integration of dwellings, services and public spaces.

After World War II, Diotallevi participated in the foundation of the Movimento Studi Architettura (MSA) and worked with the Milanese public housing institutions. Through the Studio Sociale di Architettura, founded with Marescotti and Carlo Ceccucci, he contributed to several social housing projects in Milan, including the Baravalle, Varesina, Mangiagalli and Castellina districts.

Diotallevi was also co-author, with Marescotti, of studies on housing collected in Il problema sociale, costruttivo ed economico dell'abitazione (1948), a major work documenting international experiences in social housing and modern residential planning. He died in Milan in 1954.

== Sources ==
- Ciucci, Giorgio; Casciato, Maristella (1980). Franco Marescotti e la casa civile: 1934-1956. Rome: Officina.
- Conforto, Claudia; De Giorgi, Giovanni; Muntoni, Alessandro; Pazzaglini, Marcello (1977). Il dibattito architettonico in Italia 1945-1975. Rome: Officina. pp. 24, 172, 284.
- Danesi, Silvia; Patetta, Luciano, eds. (1976). Il razionalismo e l'architettura italiana durante il fascismo. Milan: Cooperativa Editrice Il Poligono. p. 120.
- Mantero, Enrico, ed. (1984). Il razionalismo italiano. Milan: Zanichelli. pp. 117–121.
- Tafuri, Manfredo (1982). "Architettura italiana 1944-1981". Storia dell'arte italiana, vol. VII: Il Novecento. Turin: Einaudi. pp. 435–436.
