= Aldo Putelli =

Italian engineer, architect and urban planner (1900–1978)

- Born: 11 June 1900; Offagna, Province of Ancona, Kingdom of Italy
- Died: 15 January 1978 (aged 77)
- Education: Polytechnic University of Milan
- Occupations: Engineer, architect, urban planner

Aldo Putelli (11 June 1900 – 15 January 1978) was an Italian engineer, architect and urban planner. He graduated in civil engineering from the Polytechnic University of Milan and devoted his career mainly to urban planning, social housing and civic architecture.

== Life and career ==
Born in Offagna, near Ancona, Putelli graduated in civile engineering from the Polytechnic University of Milan in 1923. He worked in Milan during the interwar and post-war periods, participating in the development of modern Italian urban planning culture.

He designed the GIL headquarters in Monza and contributed to the city's master plans both before and after the World War II. Putelli also worked on colonial architecture, designing in 1939 with Ezio Cerutti a housing project in Addis Ababa, then part of Italian East Africa. Their collaboration continued throughout their careers, with Putelli and Cerutti working together on numerous architectural and urban planning projects.

Between 1943 and 1944, for political reasons, Putelli was interned in the San Vittore prison in Milan. After the war, he was involved in studies and projects concerning workers' housing, neighbourhood planning and the relationship between architecture and social reform. Among his activities were collaborations on major Milanese urban projects, including the experimental QT8 district, where he worked with Cerutti, Vittorio Gandolfi, Gino Pollini, Pietro Porcinai, Vittoriano Viganò, and others. His best-known projects also included the INA-Casa Baggio II housing development (1950–1953), designed with Cerutti, Carlo Ceccucci and Franco Marescotti; the IACP Pompeo Castelli housing (1946–1952), designed with Cerutti; and the INA-Casa Vialba housing development (1958–1965), designed with Cerutti, Cesare Lacca, Giorgio Moro, Fausto Natoli and Carlo Rusconi Clerici.

In the 1960s, together with Gandolfi, Renato Bazzoni and Luigi Fratino, he designed the Torre Servizi Tecnici Comunali.

In addition to architecture and urbanism, Putelli was also active as a painter. In the post-war period he joined the Theosophical Society associated with the ideas of Rudolf Steiner and later became involved in pacifist activities. From 1961 to 1972 he served as president of the Lombardy section of the War Resisters' International.

Putelli died on 15 January 1978.
