= Monte Stella (Milan) =

Artificial hill and park in Milan, Italy

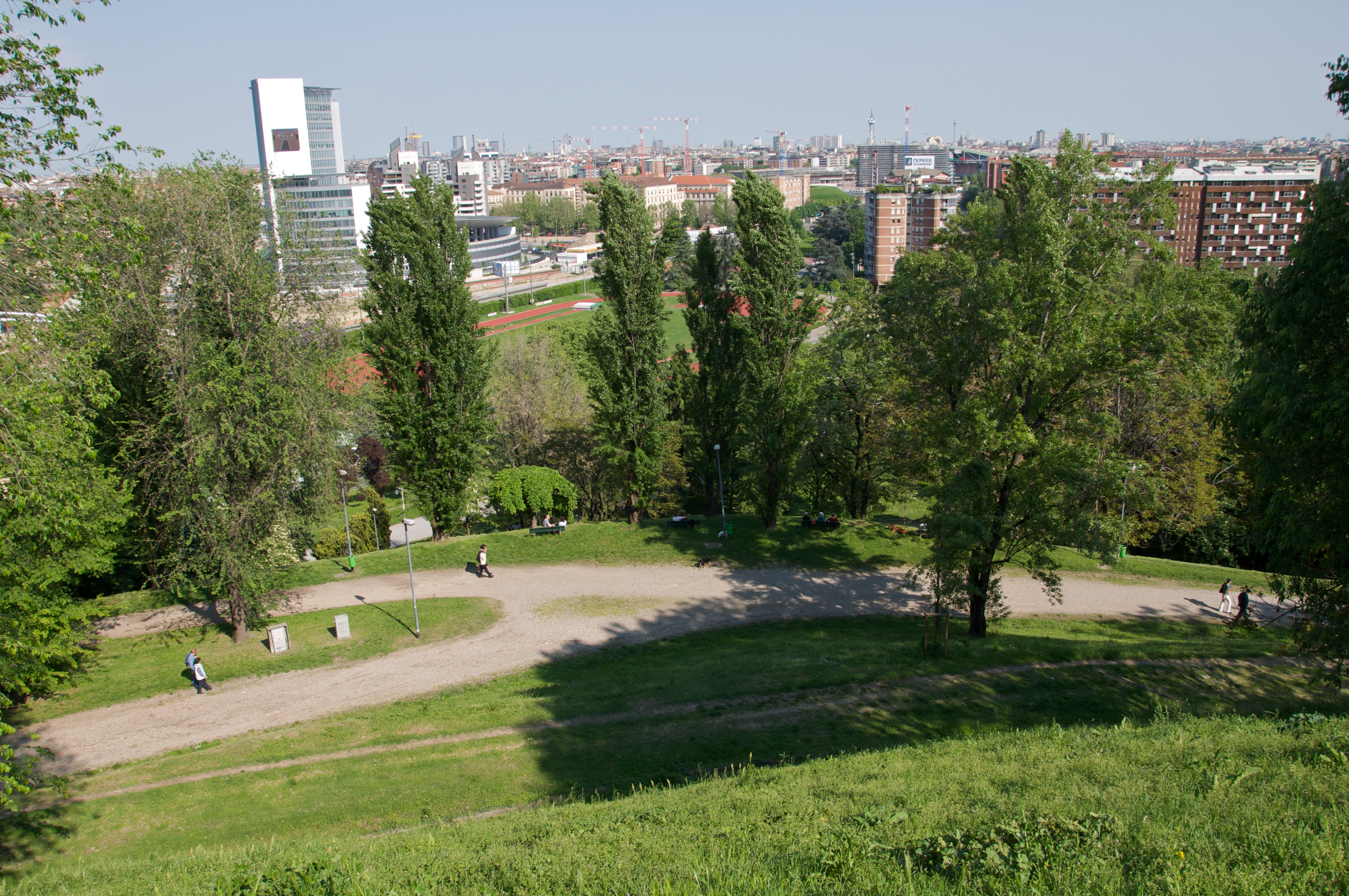
A view of Milan from the Monte Stella park

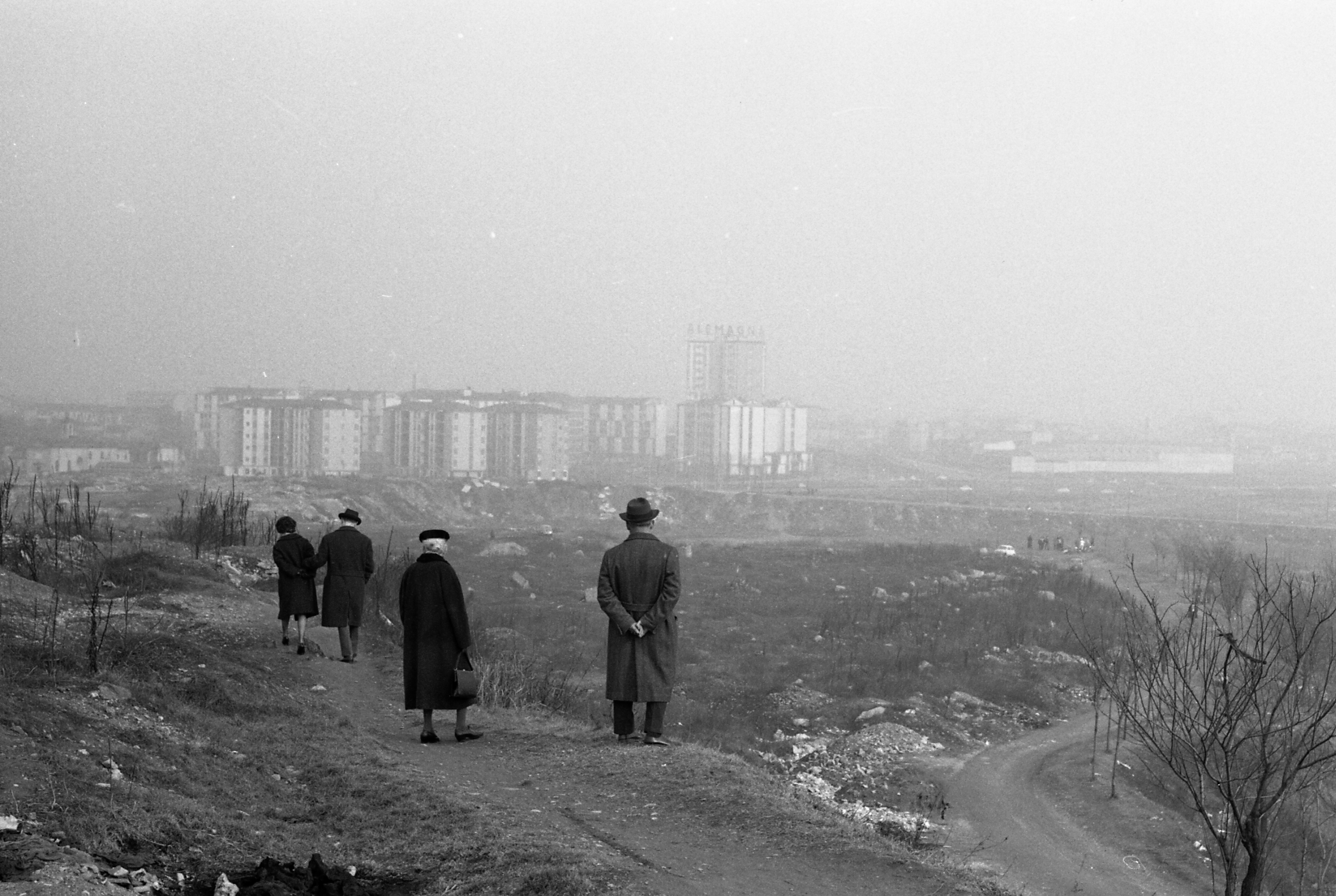
Milano from the top of Mount Stella in 1962. Paolo Monti photographer.

Monte Stella ("Starmount"), also informally called Montagnetta di San Siro ("Little mountain of San Siro") is an artificial hill and surrounding city park in Milan, Italy. The park, established in the 1950s, has an overall area of 370,000 m^{2}. The hill was created using the debris from the buildings that were bombed during World War II, as well as from the last remnants of the Spanish walls of the city, demolished in the mid 20th century.

The park is located in the QT8 district. This was an experimental district that was completely designed after the World War. The hill itself was designed by architect Piero Bottoni, who led the team of architects who contributed to the QT8 project. Bottoni dedicated the hill to his wife, Stella.

The hill is 45 m high; according to the original design, it should have been twice as high, but it was later redesigned to avoid damaging buildings in the nearby street Via Isernia as a consequence of side pressure. Even at only 25 m height, the hill provides a panoramic view of the city and hinterland, and in a clear day, the Alps and Apennines can be distinguished from atop.

A notable area of the park is called "Giardino dei Giusti" (Garden of the Just), which is a memorial to distinguished opponents of genocide and crimes against humanity; each tree in the garden is dedicated to one such person. Notable people who have been dedicated a tree in the Giardino dei Giusti include Moshe Bejski, Andrej Sakharov, Svetlana Broz, and Pietro Kuciukian.
