= Saul Greco =

Italian architect

- Born: 6 December 1910; Catanzaro, Kingdom of Italy
- Died: 16 December 1971 (aged 61); Isfahan, Iran
- Education: University of Naples
- Occupations: Architect, urban planner

Saul Greco (6 December 1910 – 16 December 1971) was an Italian architect and urban planner.

== Life and career ==
Greco graduated in architecture in Naples in 1938. During World War II, he served in the military engineering corps, specifically in the bridge-building and railway engineering divisions. Coming from an anti-fascist family—his brother Mario was executed by fascists in 1944—Greco waited for the liberation before joining the University of Naples, where he became a tenured assistant to Marcello Canino in the Chair of Architectural Elements, a position he held until 1964.

After obtaining his teaching license in Architectural Composition and Spatial Planning in 1958, he was invited to Rome by Pasquale Carbonara. That same year, he won the competition for the Chair of Technical Architecture at the Faculty of Engineering in Bari. In 1961, he was appointed full professor and took over the Chair of Construction Elements at the Faculty of Architecture in Rome, also leading the institute of the same name. He was later appointed director of the Central Library.

In 1967, Greco was elected Dean of the Faculty of Architecture. He played a key role in modernizing the institute, still heavily marked by the fascist architectural legacy of Marcello Piacentini and Vincenzo Fasolo. He invited prominent figures such as Ludovico Quaroni, Luigi Piccinato, Bruno Zevi, and Leonardo Benevolo to join the faculty, and launched various initiatives that opened the university to international discourse, including awarding honorary degrees to Hans Scharoun and Richard Neutra.

Appointed Vice Rector in 1970, he organized several cultural missions abroad. During one such mission to Iran in late 1971—accompanied by Quaroni and Benevolo—he died after falling from the dome of the Jameh Mosque of Isfahan.

Among his most significant works are: the Municipal Theatre (1953) and the Civil Hospital in Catanzaro (1955), the CEEP District in Reggio Calabria (1960), the Lamezia Terme Courthouse (1961), the Faculty of Science in Messina (1965), and the Museum of Flags at the Vittoriano in Rome (1965).

== Sources ==
- Sestito, Marcello (2006). Saul Greco. Lo scatto angolare. Catanzaro: Grafiche Simone Editrice.
- Wolf, Agnes (2009). "Saul Greco". Allgemeines Künstlerlexikon. Die Bildenden Künstler aller Zeiten Und Völker. Vol. 61. Berlin: De Gruyter. pp. 194–195.
