= Renato Bazzoni =

Italian architect and conservationist (1922–1996)

- Born: 28 March 1922; Milan, Kingdom of Italy
- Died: 9 December 1996 (aged 74)
- Education: Polytechnic University of Milan
- Occupations: Architect, conservationist

Renato Bazzoni (28 March 1922 – 9 December 1996) was an Italian architect and conservationist, known as one of the founders of Fondo Ambiente Italiano.

== Life and career ==
Born in Milan to a Tuscan family, Bazzoni graduated in architecture from the Polytechnic University of Milan and worked as an assistant professor of architectural composition.

After World War II, he carried out a professional career in Milan, designing industrial buildings, residential projects, hospitals and public works. In the 1960s, together with Luigi Fratino, Vittorio Gandolfi and Aldo Putelli, he designed the Torre Servizi Tecnici Comunali.

Bazzoni devoted increasing attention to the preservation of Italy's historical and rural heritage, joining Italia Nostra in 1964. Three years later, he conceived the exhibition Italia da salvare, which documented the threats affecting Italy's artistic and environmental heritage after the floods of Florence and Venice in 1966. Bazzoni later contributed to the Tecneco environmental survey promoted by Eni and Corriere della Sera.

In 1975 he co-founded the Fondo Ambiente Italiano (FAI) together with Giulia Maria Crespi, Alberto Predieri and Franco Russoli, inspired by the British National Trust. He also supervised restoration for several properties acquired by FAI, including the castle of Avio, Masino and the Torba Abbey.

Bazzoni died suddenly on 9 December 1996.
