= Bonnet Tower =

Skyscraper in Milan, Italy

- Italian: Torre Bonnet
- Interactive map of the Bonnet Tower area
- Alternative names: Corso Como Place

General information
- Location: Milan, Italy
- Coordinates: 45°28′57.53″N 9°11′07.67″E

Height
- Height: 70 m (230 ft)

The Bonnet Tower (Italian: Torre Bonnet), also known as Corso Como Place, is an office skyscraper in Milan, Italy.

== History ==
The building was erected by the Pirelli company in the 1950s based on a design by the team of architects made by Francesco Diomede, Giuseppe and Carlo Rusconi Clerici. Over the years, the complex served as the office of Unilever, was decommissioned in 2008, and was eventually acquired by COIMA in 2016. COIMA renovated the building based on a design by the London-based architectural firm PLP Architecture. As announced in 2019, once the renovation was completed, the tower was leased to the consulting firm Accenture, becoming its new Milan headquarters.

== Description ==
The complex consists of the main tower, which reaches a height of 70 m (230 ft) with 21 floors, and a four-story podium used for mixed commercial and office purposes.
