= Lamezia Terme Courthouse =

Judiciary building in Lamezia Terme, Italy

- Interactive map of the Lamezia Terme Courthouse area

General information
- Type: Courthouse
- Location: Lamezia Terme, Calabria, Italy
- Coordinates: 38°58′11.9″N 16°18′55.08″E
- Construction started: 1962
- Completed: 1965

Design and construction
- Architect: Saul Greco

The Lamezia Terme Courthouse (Italian: Palazzo di Giustizia di Lamezia Terme, lit. 'Palace of Justice of Lamezia Terme') is a judicial complex located on Piazza della Repubblica in Lamezia Terme, Italy.

== History ==
The project for the new courthouse was submitted on 14 October 1961, by architect Saul Greco. The chosen location was in the center of the town of Nicastro, which later became Lamezia Terme. Construction began in 1962 and was completed in 1965.

== Description ==
The building's floor plan consists of three blocks: one rectangular and two square, positioned at different levels. These spaces are connected internally by a portico with cross vaults overlooking a square-shaped courtyard. The courthouse develops over four floors plus a ground floor. In the two square sections to the south, the ground floor is closed, while in the rectangular section, an open portico rests on a foundation with access stairs facing both the square in front and the side space. The façade of the rectangular volume features an asymmetrical smooth pediment as its crowning element, with the inscription "IVSTITIA" in relief.

The closed structural grid—4 meters and its multiples—becomes "a linguistic element" through which "architecture merges with the structure and vice versa".

== Sources ==
- Sestito, Marcello (2006). Saul Greco. Lo scatto angolare. Catanzaro: Grafiche Simone Editrice. p. 91.
- Martorano, Francesca (2020). L'Architettura in Calabria dal 1945 ad oggi. Reggio Calabria: Iiriti. pp. 168–169.

== See also ==
- List of courthouses in Italy
