= Palazzo Santa Margherita, Milan =

Palazzo Santa Margherita
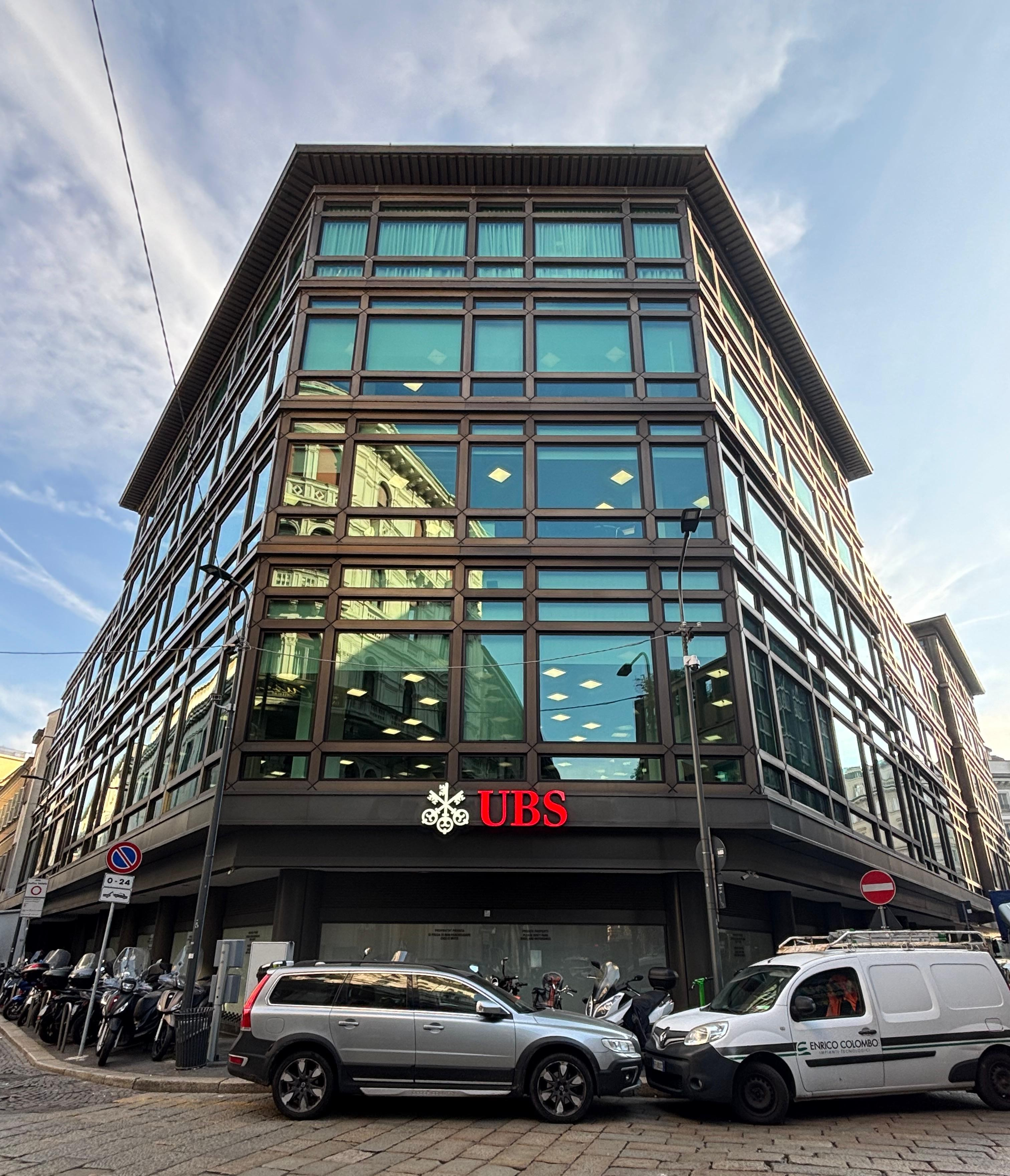
- Palazzo Santa Margherita in 2025
- Click on the map for a fullscreen view

General information
- Location: Milan, Italy
- Coordinates: 45°27′58.01″N 9°11′17.7″E

Palazzo Santa Margherita, also known as Palazzo del Banco Popolare di Novara, is a historic building located in Milan, Italy.

== History ==
The building, designed by architect Luigi Vietti, was completed in 1979 as the new offices of Banca Popolare di Novara. Its construction required the demolition of the bank's previous building, built in the early 1930s, as well as an adjoining Neo-Renaissance building that had been extensively altered after the Second World War. The new complex also preserved and incorporated the nineteenth-century façade of the building at 5 Via Santa Margherita.

The 1930s Banca Popolare di Novara building had itself been built on the site of the Church of San Protaso ad Monachos, which was demolished in 1930.

The building later housed the Milan offices of Credit Suisse and, following its acquisition in 2023, those of UBS until 2025. In 2015, the property was sold by American real estate company Tishman Speyer to a vehicle managed by the Milanese real estate company COIMA.

In 2026, the building underwent a major renovation. Earlier that year, it was announced that, upon completion of the works, it would become Goldman Sachs' new Milan headquarters.

== Description ==
The building occupies a site bounded by Via Santa Margherita, Via San Protaso, and Via San Dalmazio in Milan's CBD.

It is an example of post-war corporate architecture inspired by the principles of the International Style. Its glass curtain wall, articulated by a strict modular aluminium grid, together with the recessed ground floor set back from the street line, enhances the impression of a light volume seemingly suspended above the street. Along its Via Santa Margherita frontage, the building incorporates the preserved nineteenth-century façade of an earlier structure.
