= Scalo Romana =

District in Milan, Italy

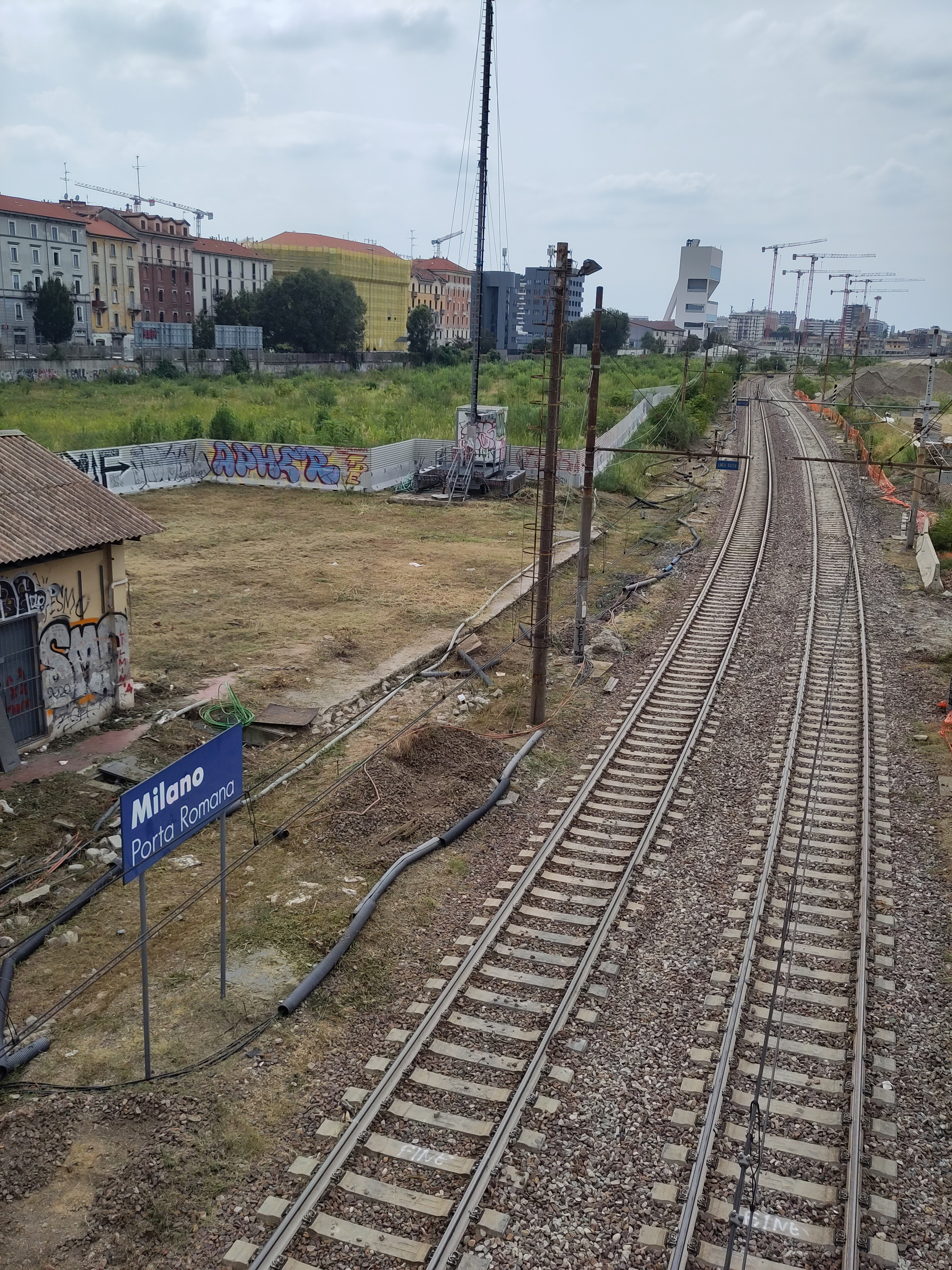
- Scalo Romana in 2023
- Interactive map of Scalo Romana
- Location: Zone 5, Milan, Italy
- Coordinates: 45°26′44″N 9°12′17″E
- Groundbreaking: 2023
- Website: scaloportaromana.com

Technical details
- Size: 19 ha (47 acres)

Scalo Romana is a district in Milan, Italy, which is at the center of a significant urban regeneration project consisting in the redevelopment of the former Porta Romana railway yard. The initiative aims to transform the disused area into a comprehensive and integrated urban center, incorporating residential, commercial, cultural, and green spaces, in line with contemporary principles of sustainable urban planning.

== History ==
The Porta Romana railway yard was established alongside the Milano Scalo Romana railway station, which was inaugurated in 1891. It played a central role in the industrial development of the southeastern area of Milan, serving major factories such as Tecnomasio Italiano Brown Boveri and the Besozzi Marzoli and Verga mills. Over time, however, the railway infrastructure also came to represent a physical barrier within the urban fabric, sharply dividing the areas to its north and south. With the decline of industrial activity and the subsequent discontinuation of operations, the yard gradually fell into a state of abandonment.

In 2005, the large-scale urban regeneration program "Scali Milano", of which the redevelopment project of Scalo Romana is part, was launched. The program, later formalized in 2017, was aimed at revitalizing seven former railway yards across Milan. In 2020, Ferrovie dello Stato Italiane, the owner of the Porta Romana railway yard, initiated a public competitive tender for the sale of the site. The procedure attracted significant interest, with participation from approximately 20 leading Italian and international real estate operators. The winning bid came from a fund managed by the Milan-based real estate company COIMA, known as the Fondo Scalo di Porta Romana, participated by Covivio, Prada Holding and COIMA ESG City Impact Fund as investors. The area was acquired for a total of €180 million.

== Project ==
The regeneration project of the former railway yard includes the construction of the Milan Olympic Village, a large central park, and various other buildings designated for residential, office, and cultural use.
