= Palazzo San Fedele =

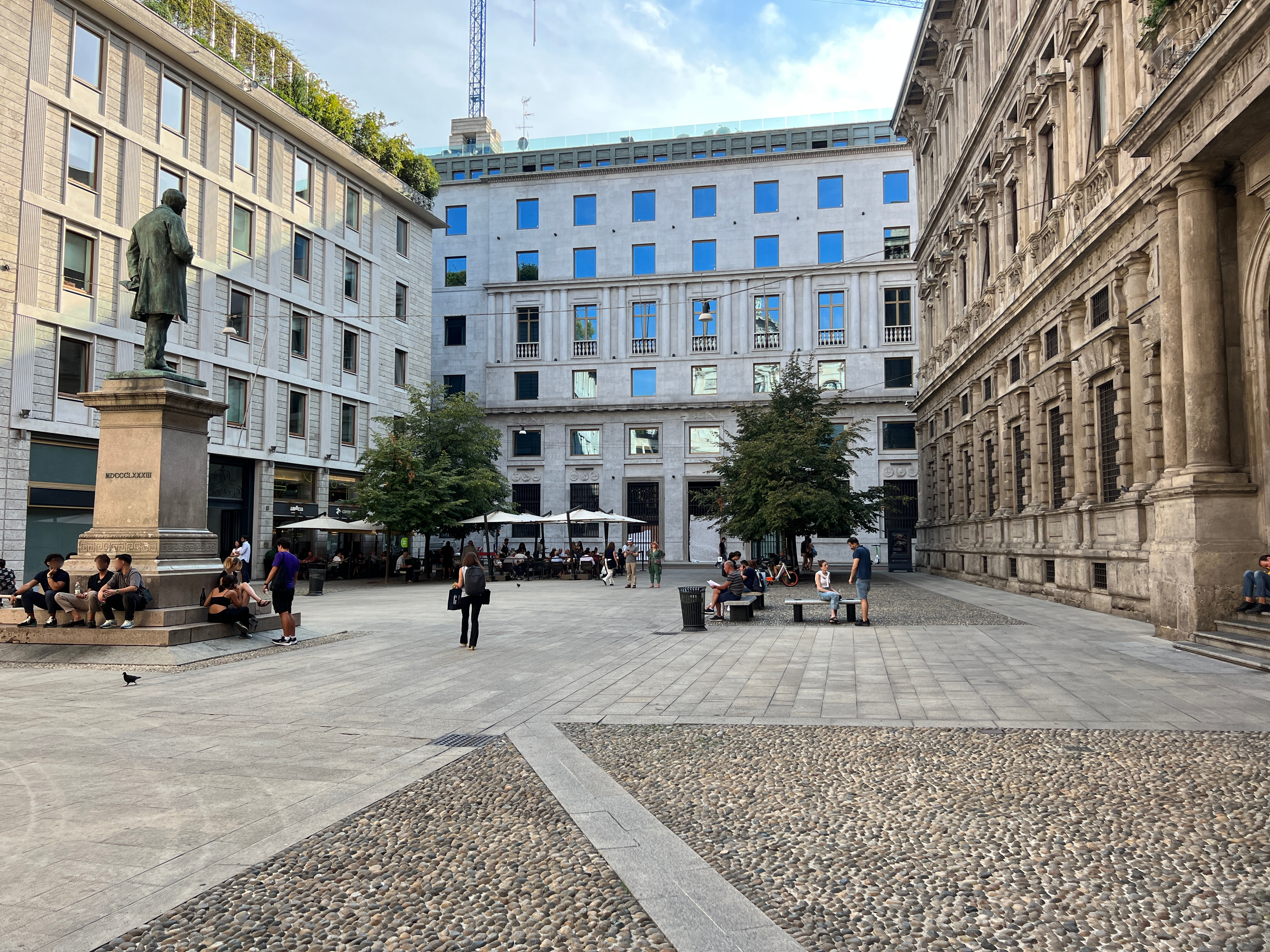
- Palazzo San Fedele in 2022
- Click on the map for a fullscreen view

General information
- Location: Milan, Italy
- Coordinates: 45°27′57.68″N 9°11′26.22″E

Palazzo San Fedele is a historic building located in Milan, Italy.

== History ==
The building, designed by architect Cesare Pascoletti in collaboration with architects Alpago and Cabiati, was constructed in 1952 as the Milan headquarters of the Banca Nazionale del Lavoro, and was erected on a site previously occupied by an 1872 building that had been the first home of the Teatro Manzoni, which was destroyed during the bombings of the Second World War. The building later housed the Milan headquarters of BNP Paribas following a renovation completed in 2008.

In 2018, the building was sold to a vehicle managed by the Milan-based real estate company COIMA as part of a broader property transaction that saw BNP Paribas relocate its offices to the Torre Diamante in the Porta Nuova district. Later, the building underwent renovation and enhancement works overseen by the architecture firm Asti Architetti. Upon completion of the works, the building was leased to Bottega Veneta, becoming its new headquarters. In 2023, the building was sold to a new vehicle managed by COIMA but subscribed by the German investor Union Investment.

== Description ==
The building, located in the centre of Milan in Piazza San Fedele, features a stripped neoclassical style. It has seven above-ground floors plus two basement levels.
