= Milan Olympic Village =

Residential complex for 2026 Winter Olympics

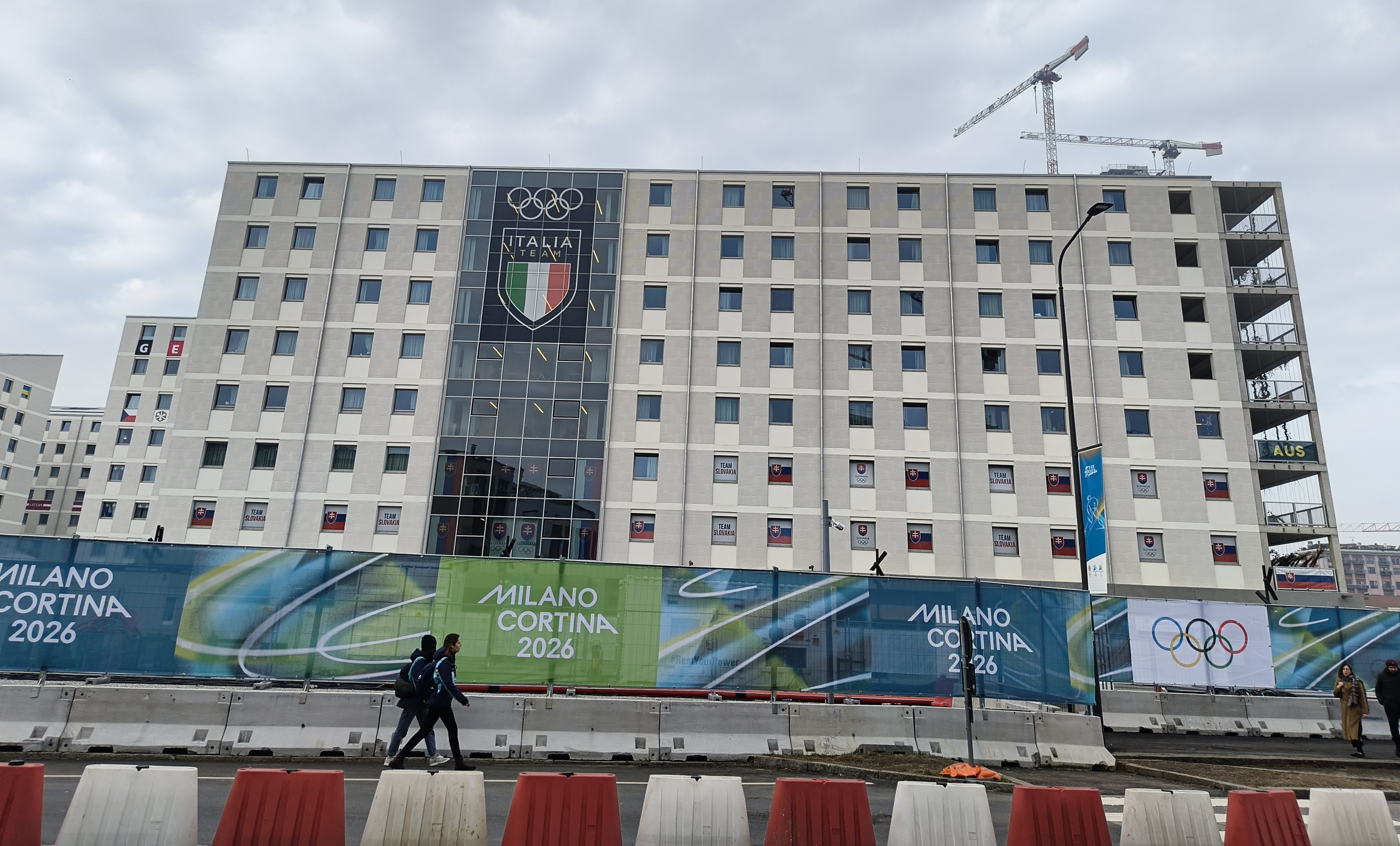
- The complex in February 2026
- Interactive map of Milan Olympic Village
- Location: Milan, Italy
- Coordinates: 45°26′40″N 9°12′04″E
- Type: Olympic Village

Construction
- Built: 2022-2025

The Milan Olympic Village is one of the Olympic Villages that hosted the athletes participating in the 2026 Winter Olympics and the 2026 Winter Paralympics, which took place in Milan and Cortina d'Ampezzo between February and March 2026. It is one of six Olympic villages that hosted athletes during the Games.

== History ==
The project of the complex, which was built as part of the Scalo Romana redevelopment project and which was developed by real estate company COIMA and designed by the American architecture firm Skidmore, Owings & Merrill, was presented in July 2021, with delivery planned in July 2025. The construction works, which lasted 30 months, were completed in June 2025, one month ahead of schedule. The complex was presented to the public during a ceremony attended by institutions, investors, and other stakeholders on 30 September 2025, and was then handed over to Fondazione Milano-Cortina 2026 the following day.

During the Games, it hosted 1,500 residents. The village was officially inaugurated by Kirsty Coventry on Monday, February 2, 2026.

At the end of the Olympic Games, the complex underwent some repurposing works, reopening in August 2026 as a student residence with approximately 1,700 beds, thus becoming the largest publicly subsidized student residence in Italy. Additionally, the Olympic Village Plaza is set to transform into a community square featuring retail stores, bars, restaurants, and cafés at ground level. The plaza will also include outdoor areas designated for farmers' markets and various community activities.

== Description ==
The village, located in the western side of the new Scalo Romana district, covers an area of approximately 60,000 m^{2} (650,000 sq ft). The complex consists of six newly constructed buildings, two pre-existing structures of industrial origin, as well as an Olympic plaza.

== See also ==
- List of Olympic Villages
