= Pordenone Courthouse =

Building in Pordenone, Italy

- Interactive map of the Pordenone Courthouse area

General information
- Location: Pordenone, Friuli-Venezia Giulia, Italy
- Coordinates: 45°57′21.65″N 12°39′49.42″E
- Construction started: 1964
- Completed: 1966
- Inaugurated: 20 April 1968; 58 years ago

Design and construction
- Architect: Ezio Cerutti

The Pordenone Courthouse (Palazzo di Giustizia, or Palazzo del Tribunale) is a building located on Piazza Giustiniano in Pordenone, Italy.

== History ==
In 1960, the municipal administration of Pordenone launched the design of a new Palace of Justice, intended to replace the previous location housed in the Dominican convent in Piazza XX Settembre, which had become unusable due to deterioration and damage caused by wartime bombings.

The project was entrusted to Ezio Cerutti, a Milanese architect and urban planner, who had already been commissioned to revise the city's master plan. The new building was planned on a municipally owned plot located between Viale Franco Martelli, Via Rivierasca, and Via dei Molini.

The original 1964 design envisioned three building volumes of different heights, arranged in a U-shaped layout around an internal courtyard. However, following a revised plan approved in the same year, a second office block identical to the one on Viale Martelli was added on the opposite side, and the courtroom block was shifted to a central position, thus eliminating the courtyard.

Also in 1964, a national competition was held for the creation of a bas-relief to be placed on the main façade, which was awarded to the Roman sculptor Umberto Clementi (1904–1988). The building was completed in 1966. The official inauguration took place on 20 April 1968.

== Description ==
The building features a rational and solemn composition, drawing inspiration from the traditional model of the public palace, but reinterpreted through a modern architectural lens. Its layout consists of two parallel office wings—one facing Viale Martelli and its identical counterpart on the opposite side—and a central block housing the courtrooms, which was originally conceived as a stand-alone structure.

The main façade, which overlooks Viale Martelli, clearly expresses the institutional character of the complex. This is conveyed through a rusticated stone base, a façade clad in litoceramic panels punctuated by a regular sequence of windows, and a crowning element defined by a continuous row of low-set windows just beneath the roofline, evoking the impression of a monumental cornice.

Structurally, the building is constructed with a reinforced concrete frame, composite floor slabs, and stairwells enclosed by concrete walls.

== Sources ==
- Baccichet M.; Catto A.; Tomasella P., eds. (2016). "Palazzo di Giustizia". Pordenone Novecento. Guida alle architetture. Pordenone: Giavedoni.
