= Bari Courthouse =

Judiciary building in Bari, Italy

- Interactive map of the Bari Courthouse area

General information
- Type: Courthouse
- Location: Bari, Apulia, Italy
- Coordinates: 41°07′23.9″N 16°51′23.35″E
- Construction started: 1957
- Completed: 1959

Design and construction
- Architect: Pasquale Carbonara
- Engineer: Giuseppe Signorile Bianchi

The Bari Courthouse (Italian: Palazzo di Giustizia di Bari, lit. 'Palace of Justice of Bari') is a judicial complex located on Piazza Enrico De Nicola in Bari, Italy.

== History ==
The construction of the courthouse in Bari began in 1957 under the direction of commissioner Pasquale del Prete, following numerous difficulties due to the lack of suitable central sites. Previously, the courthouse was located in the historic 19th-century building in Piazza Cesare Battisti. The project was carried out in the late 1950s, based on designs by engineer Giuseppe Signorile Bianchi and architect Pasquale Carbonara, a renowned professor and public works designer from Bari. The building was completed in 1959, but the transfer of the judicial offices was finalized in 1967.

In 2023, the project to create a new Parco della Giustizia (Park of Justice) in the Carassi neighborhood was approved. It aims to bring together all the judicial offices present in the city.

== Description ==
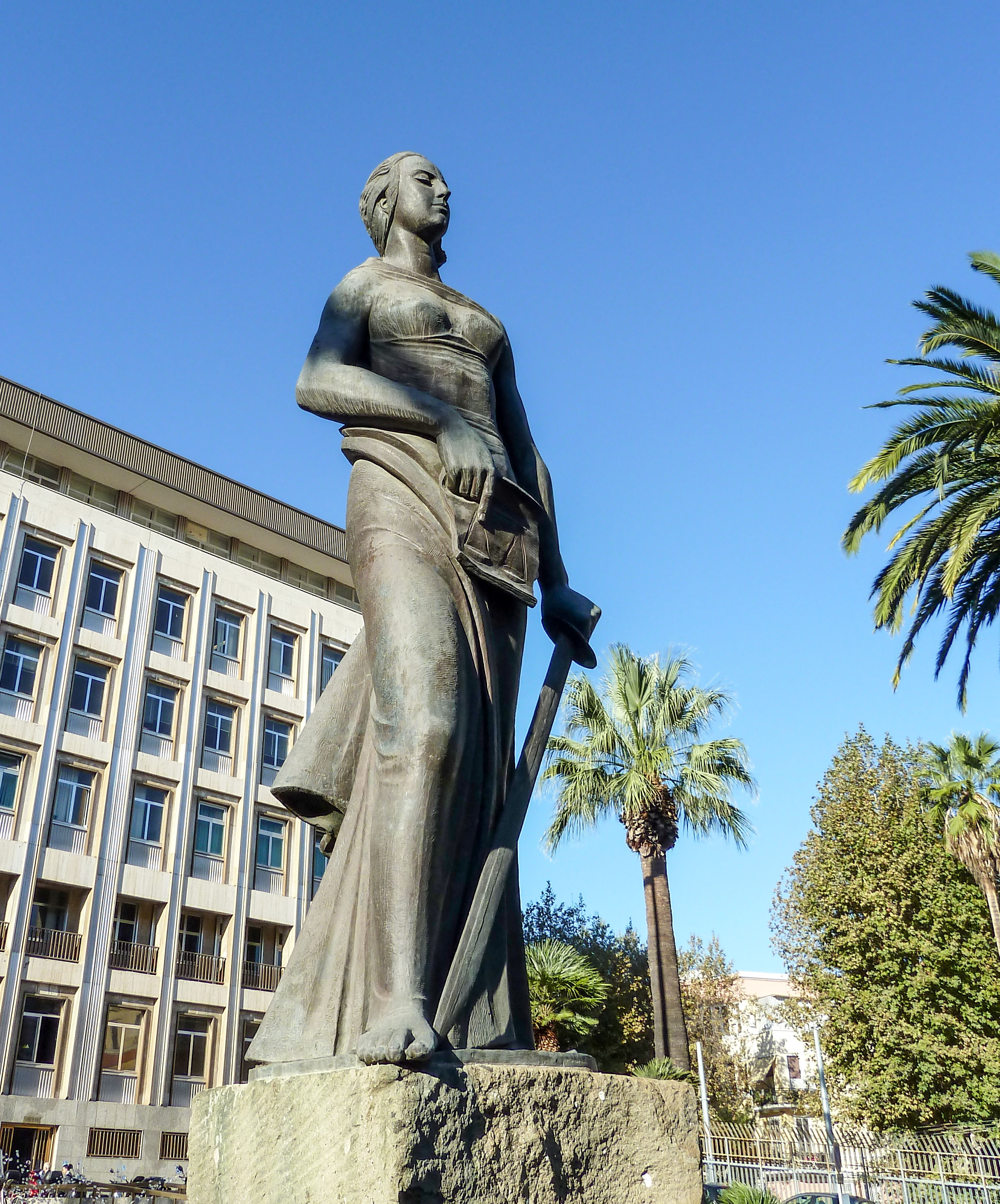
The courthouse behind the sculpture of the Justice

Located in the Libertà district, the building features a regular, monumental volume with a classical façade characterized by large stone and metal pilasters. It spans five levels, interrupted only at the access staircase. The structure includes a raised ground floor, a recessed attic floor, and two internal courtyards, offering a modern and rigorous interpretation of the typical "palace of justice" and public building typologies.

In front of the building, the statue of the Justice sculpted by Enzo Assenza was located in 1963.

== Sources ==
- Mannino, Natalina (2001). Pasquale Carbonara architetto e l'insegnamento dei "Caratteri degli edifici". Rome: Gangemi. pp. 291–316.
