= Feltrinelli Porta Volta =

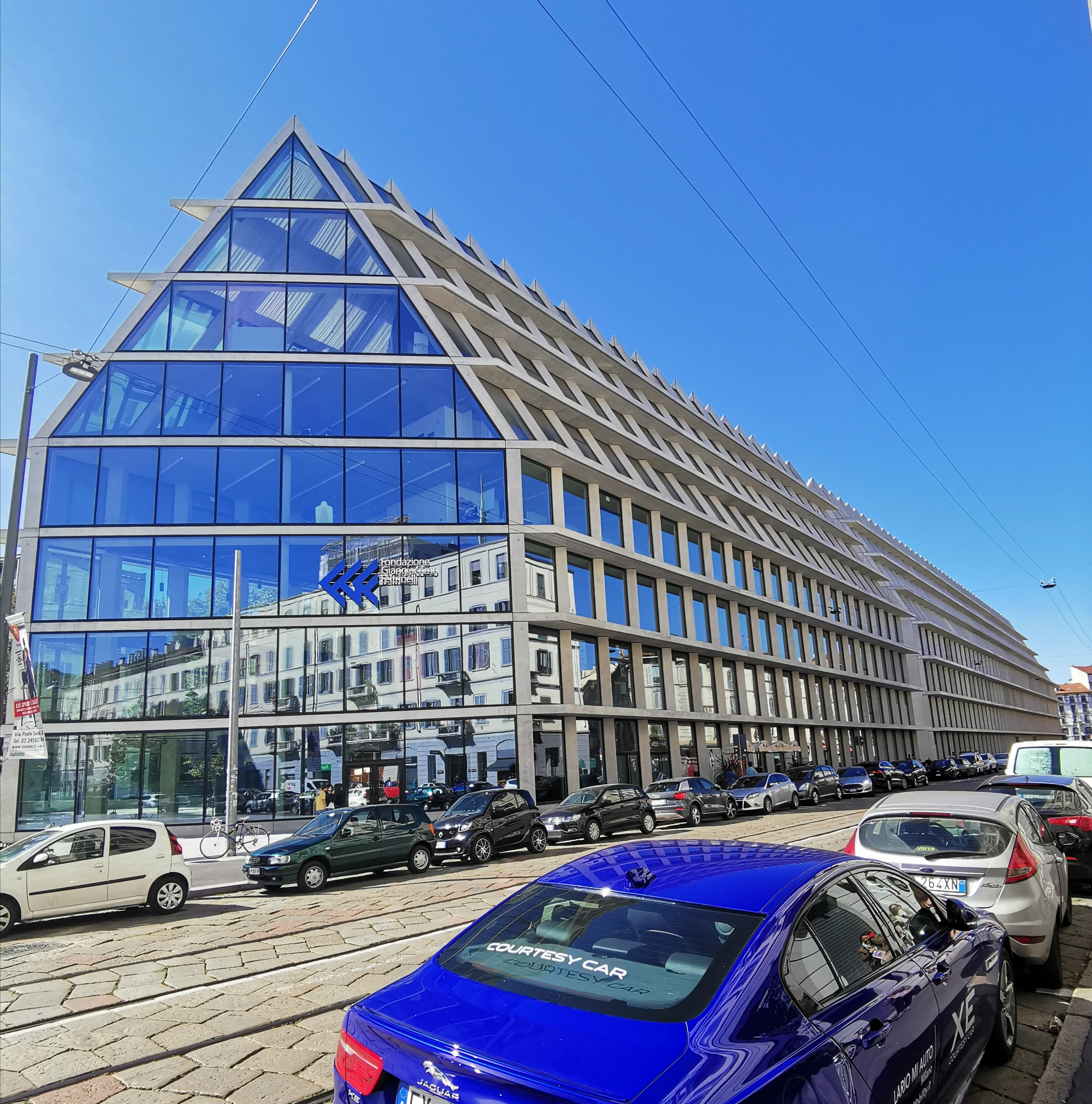
- Feltrinelli Porta Volta in 2020
- Click on the map for a fullscreen view

General information
- Location: Milan, Italy
- Coordinates: 45°28′53.1″N 9°11′03.69″E

Feltrinelli Porta Volta is a building complex located in Milan, Italy.

== History ==
The building, which is the first to be designed by Herzog & de Meuron in Italy, was inaugurated in 2016. It was developed by Italian real estate company COIMA which was chosen by Feltrinelli Group as manager for a purpose made fund. The project aimed to revitalize a historically underused area along Viale Pasubio turning the side into a cultural and civic hub. The complex houses the Feltrinelli Foundation, a public library, and offices housing Microsoft Italy's headquarters.

== Description ==
The complex comprises two adjecient buildings whose architectural design is defined by a roughly 200-metre long, narrow volume, with a distinctive repetitive pitched roof structure and fully glazed façades.
