= Torre Servizi Tecnici Comunali =

Building in Milan, Italy

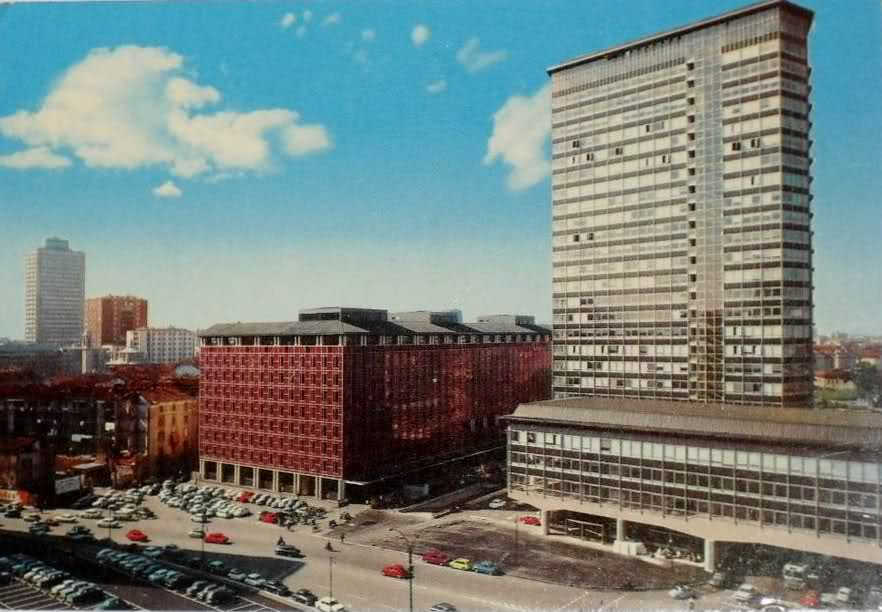
- Torre Servizi Tecnici Comunali in the 1960s
- Interactive map of the Torre Servizi Tecnici Comunali area

General information
- Location: Milan, Italy
- Coordinates: 45.484°N 9.1947°E
- Opening: 1966

Height
- Height: 90 m (300 ft)

Design and construction
- Architects: Renato Bazzoni, Luigi Fratino, Vittorio Gandolfi, Aldo Putelli

Torre Servizi Tecnici Comunali is a skyscraper in Milan, Italy.

== History ==
The building, designed by architects Renato Bazzoni, Luigi Fratino, Vittorio Gandolfi and Aldo Putelli, was built in 1966.

On March 29, 2019, the building was transferred to COIMA, which acquired it at the end of a public auction for the price of 175 million euros.

== Description ==
The building stands at a height of 90 meters and has 25 floors. It is distinguished by a low structure that was built as a bridge over Via Melchiorre Gioia.
