= Giuseppe Pagano =

Italian architect (1896–1945)

Giuseppe Pagano

Giuseppe Pagano (20 August 1896 – 22 April 1945) was an Italian architect, notable for his involvement in the movement of rationalist architecture in Italy up to the end of the Second World War. He designed exhibitions, furniture and interiors and was an amateur photographer. He was also a long-time editor of the magazine Casabella.

== Background ==
Giuseppe Pogatschnig was born to a Jewish family in Parenzo, Istria, (then in the Austro-Hungarian Empire), now Poreč, part of Croatia. After attending the Italian language Lyceum in Trieste, he fled to join the Italian army at the onset of the First World War and adopted the Italian name, Pagano. He was twice wounded and twice captured but managed to escape. In the years immediately following the war, Pagano was associated with Nationalist and Pre-Fascist politics and would be among the founders of the first fascist party in his hometown of Parenzo.

== Architecture ==
In 1924, Pagano graduated from the Politecnico of Turin, with a degree in architecture. In the late 1920s, he started work designing bridges, and buildings including the Gualino office building in Turin (1928) with Gino Levi-Montalcini, and working on a number of pavilions exhibitions for the Turin Exposition of 1929. In 1931, he moved to Milan to work for La Casa Bella, founded by Guido Marangoni in 1928. He worked alongside Edoardo Persico, Anna Maria Mazzucchelli, Giulia Veronesi, Giancarlo Palanti, Mario Labò, Agnoldomenico Pica and Giulio Carlo Argan and together they transformed the home and decoration magazine into a key platform for architectural and political debate.

== Philosophy ==
From the late 1920s, Pagano had adopted a rationalist position, influenced by Futurism and the European avant-gardes – he became an architect caught between the theory and practice of Fascist Italy whose approach advocated for a triad of Unity, Abstraction and Coherence. He had a significant career as a writer and defender of rationalist architecture in the press, especially Casabella, whose name he soon changed from La Casa Bella when he became director of the magazine in 1933 along with Neapolitan art critic Edoardo Persico. Pagano and Persico revolutionized the graphic format and used their editorial position both to call to arms like-minded colleagues who believed in the power of architecture to transform modern life and to violently criticize those who reduced it to an ‘aping of styles’.

== Exhibition and pavilion design ==
The Turin Expo of 1928 was Pagano's first foray into exhibition design, where he was responsible for the overall layout of the exposition and five of its pavilions. He also designed the Italian Pavilion for the Liège Expo of 1930 with Gino Levi Montalcini as well as the interiors and many of the exhibition spaces for the Italian Pavilion at the Paris Expo of 1937 by Marcello Piacentini. He also worked on the master plan for the ill-fated Rome Expo of 1942, which was never held. He was involved in the Milan Triennial V which was held in Milanese Novecento architect Giovanni Muzio's Palazzo dell'Arte specially built in the Parco Sempione when the Exposition of Industrial and Decorative Arts moved from Monza to Milan. Here he collaborated in the design of two pavilions of the Housing Exhibition held in the park – the Steel Structure House and the 'Summer Hall' and the Breda ETR300 train carriage with Giò Ponti. He was also responsible for the 1934 Aeronautics Show where he designed three of the main spaces including the Hall of Honour and the Hall of Icarus. He directed the VI Triennale of 1936, together with the painter Mario Sironi and designed a new Entry Pavillion, an extension to the Palazzo dell'Arte (the Architecture or New Pavilion), subsequently demolished due to bomb damage in the Second World War. At the 1936 Triennale, he also designed the Exhibition of Building Materials (with Guido Frette) and the Exhibition of Vernacular Architecture (with Werner Daniel). At the 7th Triennale of 1940, he was responsible for the Exhibition of Serial Production.

== Photography ==
He was also an amateur photographer, an activity sparked by his desire to document Italy's vernacular tradition in architecture. He travelled Italy ‘hunting’ for images and creating careful compositions that expressed material qualities, gave snapshots of daily life and celebrated what he saw as a ‘real’ Italy – not that of the tourist brochures and the propaganda machine. From then on he often published his own photographs in Casabella using them to strengthen his critiques of the architecture of the time.

== Politics and art ==
Though initially an active member of the Italian Fascist party, Pagano's architectural philosophy led him farther and farther from the official architects of the Fascist regime, such that his VI Triennale, in effect, proposed an alternate architectural expression for Fascism. Pagano opposed "representative architecture" of all types, whether Modern or Classical. He remained dubious of some groups of Rationalists (like the Gruppo 7 and art critics like Pier Maria Bardi) who made attempts to identify their architecture with Italian Fascism, and to make it the official state architecture. He worked closely with regime architect Marcello Piacentini on Rome's new university between 1933 and 1935.

== Protest and imprisonment ==
Pagano's position in the Fascist party and prestige among architects, as well as the diversity of cultural production under Benito Mussolini's Fascism, allowed him to openly criticize some of the regime's constructions as "bombastically rhetorical", from the pages of Casabella. In 1942, Pagano would leave the School of Fascist Mysticism (Scuola di Mistica) and the Fascist Party. In 1943 he made contact with members of the resistance, was captured in November 1943 and imprisoned at Brescia, from where he escaped in July 1944. He was recaptured in September 1944 in Milan, imprisoned at Villa Triste, and tortured. Later he was transferred to the prison of San Vittore, then to Bolzano and then to Mauthausen, Melk, and back again to Mauthausen.

== Death ==
Pagano died of pneumonia in the infirmary of the Mauthausen concentration camp in Austria on 22 April 1945. In one of his last letters to his friends, he asked: “Remember me well: a man alive and full of good will”.

== List of works ==
=== Architecture ===
Palazzo Gualino office building, Turin (with Gino Levi Montalcini), 1928–29, for the financier Riccardo Gualino

Sist School, Turin, 1931

Villa Colli, Rivara (with Gino Levi Montalcini), 1931

Entry in Santa Maria Novella Railway Station competition, Florence, 1933

Furniture and interiors for Il Popolo d’Italia offices, Milan, 1934.

Physics building, Città Universitaria, Rome, 1935

Boarding School Biella, 1936

Bocconi University, Milan, 1941 (with engineer Gian Giacomo Predaval), including Sarfatti Building

Rivetti Wool Mills, Biella, 1942 (with engineer Gian Giacomo Predaval)

=== Urban design ===
Project for the re-planning and urban renewal of Via Roma, Turin (with Gino Levi Montalcini, Ettore Sottsass and others), 1931

Master plan of E42 (with Marcello Piacentini, Luigi Piccinato, Ettore Rossi and Luigi Vietti), 1937

Green Milan (Milano Verde) Project, Master plan for Sempione-Fiera area (with Franco Albini, Ignazio Gardella and others), 1938

Horizontal City Project, Milan, 1940 (with Franco Marescotti and Irenio Diotallevi)

=== Exhibition and Pavilion Design ===
Pavilions at Turin International exposition, 1928: Gancia company, Festivals and Fashion, Hunting and Fishing, Navy and Air Force, Mines and Ceramics.

Italian Pavilion at Liege International Exposition (with Gino Levi Montalcini), 1929

Steel Structure House (with Franco Albini, Giancarlo Palanti and others) & Summer Hall (with Ottorino Aloisio, Ettore Sottsass and others), 5th Milan Triennale, 1933

ETR 200 Breda Train Carriage (with Gio Ponti), 1933

Exhibition plan and curation, design of the Hall of Honour and Icarus Room, Aeronautics Exhibition, Milan, 1934

Main entry and adjoining pavilion, Exhibition of Rural Architecture (with Guarniero Daniel), Exhibition of Building Materials (with Guido Frette), 6th Milan Triennale, 1936

Italian pavilion at Paris International Exposition (with Marcello Piacentini), 1937

Rivetti Stand, Wool Exhibits, National Textiles Exhibition, Circus Maximus, Rome (with Angelo Bianchetti), 1938

Leonardo Exhibition, Milan, 1939
