= Vittorio Gandolfi =

Italian architect and urban planner (1919–1999)

- Born: 28 April 1919; Parma, Kingdom of Italy
- Died: 1999 (aged 79–80); Milan, Italy
- Occupations: Architect, urban planner, academic

Vittorio Gandolfi (28 April 1919 – 1999) was an Italian architect, urban planner, and academic. The son of the conductor and composer Gino Gandolfi, he is regarded as one of the leading figures of post-war Italian Rationalism.

After graduating from the Polytechnic University of Milan in 1942, Gandolfi taught there before becoming professor of architectural composition at the University of Genoa. He was active in residential, airport, and religious architecture, designing housing for the INA-Casa and INCIS programmes, contributing to the planning of the QT8 district in Milan, and designing the original passenger terminals at Milan Malpensa Airport and the expansion of Milan Linate Airport. His religious works include the church of Sant'Antonio Maria Zaccaria and the church of Santo Spirito in Milan.

== Selected works ==
- QT8 master plan, Milan (1946; with Ezio Cerutti, Mario Morini, Gino Pollini, Mario Pucci and Aldo Putelli)
- Casa INCIS, Milan (1951)
- Milan Malpensa Airport passenger terminal (1956–1960)
- Milan Linate Airport terminal expansion (1960–1962)
- Church of Santo Spirito, Milan (1962)
- Church of Sant'Antonio Maria Zaccaria, Milan (1966)
- Torre Servizi Tecnici Comunali, Milan (1966)

== Selected publications ==
- Gli studi nella casa (1945)
- Vittorio Gandolfi architetto: attività dal 1942 al 1962 (with Piero Portaluppi, 1963)
- Il Teatro Farnese di Parma (1980)
- L'acciaio nell'architettura (1980)

== Sources ==
- Gandolfi, Vittorio; Portaluppi, Pietro (1963). Vittorio Gandolfi architetto: attività dal 1942 al 1962.
- Koenig, Giovanni Klaus (1983). "Vittorio Gandolfi: le due o tre cose che so di lui". Paramento (122): 12–53.
- Gorio, Federico (1983). "A proposito degli architetti Monti e Gandolfi". Casabella-Continuità (217): 56–69.
