= Umberto Toschi =

Italian geographer and economist (1897–1966)

- Born: 10 June 1897; Dozza, Province of Bologna, Kingdom of Italy
- Died: 27 July 1966 (aged 69); Bologna, Italy
- Education: University of Bologna
- Occupations: Geographer, economist, academic

Umberto Toschi (10 June 1897 – 27 July 1966) was an Italian geographer, economist and academic. He was one of the leading Italian scholars of economic, political and urban geography, contributing to the development of applied geography and regional planning in post-war Italy. He taught at the Universities of Catania, Bari, Ca' Foscari Venice and Bologna, where he directed the Institute of Geography.

== Selected works ==
- Studi di morfologia urbana (1933)
- Appunti di geografia politica (1939)
- Corso di geografia generale (1947)
- Compendio di geografia economica generale (1951)
- Geografia economica (1961)
- La città (1966)
