= COIMA =

Italian real estate company

- Industry: Real estate
- Founded: 1974; 52 years ago in Milan, Italy.
- Headquarters: Milan, Italy
- Key people: Manfredi Catella (CEO)
- Number of employees: ▲330 (2023)
- Website: coima.com

COIMA is an Italian real estate company based in Milan, Italy. The company engages in the investment, development and management of real estate assets on behalf of institutional investors. It has developed and manages, within its portfolio, several skyscrapers in Milan, including the UniCredit Tower, the tallest building in Italy.

== History ==
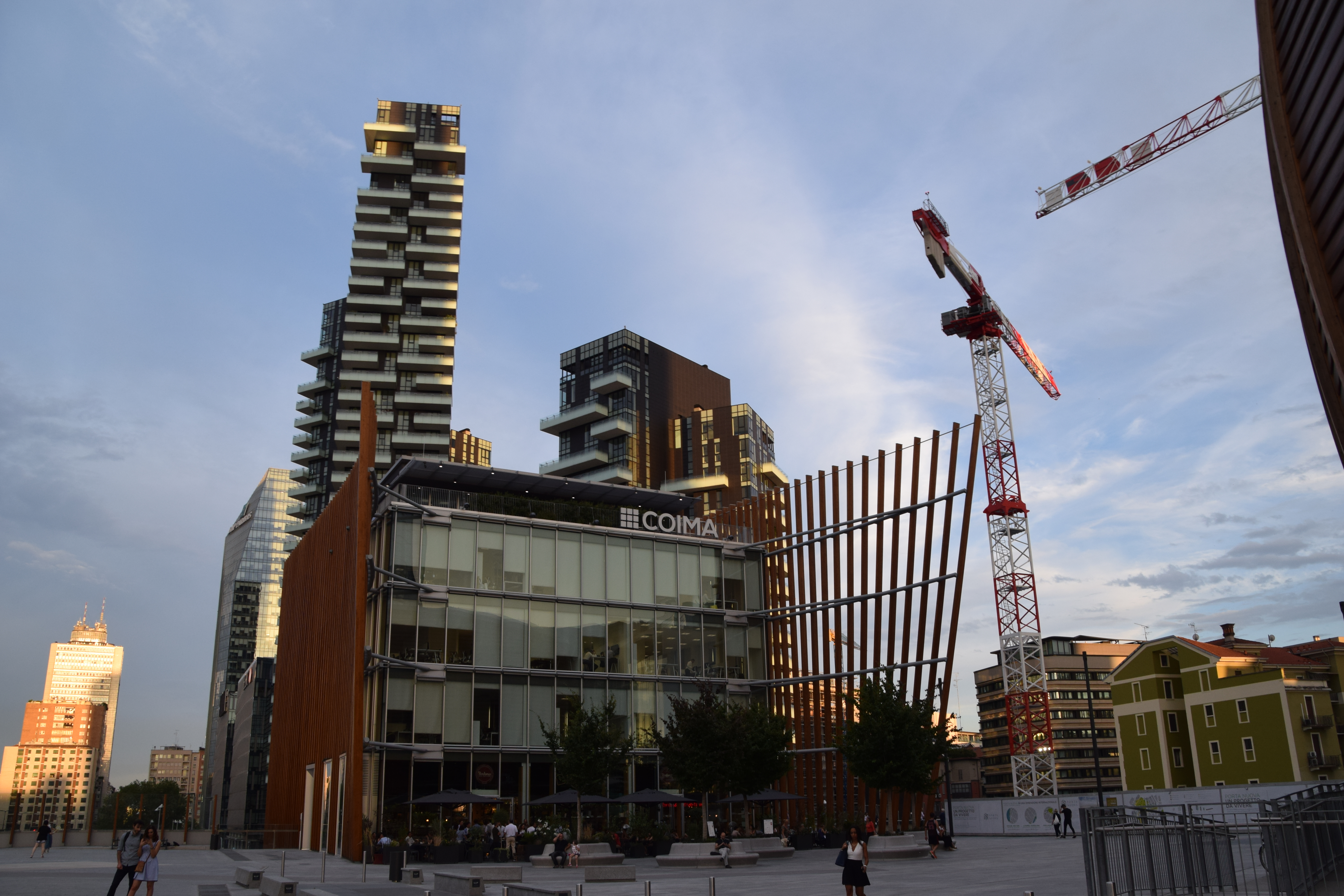
COIMA's headquarters in Milan

The origins of the group date back to 1974, when it was founded by the Catella family.

At the end of the 1990s, the company began collaborations with Hines, which culminated in the launch of the Porta Nuova development project, for which COIMA initially acted as co-investor, co-developer, and property manager. In 2007, Catella and Hines established an asset management company, which was later acquired by Catella in 2015 and renamed COIMA SGR. The following year, COIMA launched its first REIT.

In 2021, the group was reorganized with the creation of a holding structure.

In 2022, Porta Nuova became the first neighborhood in the world to obtain the dual LEED and WELL community sustainability certifications.

In November 2025, the company was selected by Cassa Depositi e Prestiti (CDP) as the industrial partner for the redevelopment of the Guido Reni barracks area in Rome. The area will therefore be transferred into a fund managed by COIMA and participated in by CDP, the CECIF fund, and Eagle Hills.

== Operations ==
COIMA operates in the real estate market through the investment, development, and management of real estate assets through four main entities: COIMA SGR, COIMA REM, COIMA HT, and COIMA Image.

COIMA SGR is the group’s asset management company. As of 2026, it manages 35 real estate investment funds, with over €13 billion in stabilized investments, 170 properties in its portfolio, and more than 220 tenants. The subsidiary collaborates and invests on behalf of some of the world’s largest sovereign wealth and pension funds, such as the Qatar Investment Authority, Caisse de dépôt et placement du Québec, and the Abu Dhabi Investment Authority. COIMA REM specializes in real estate development and property management. Finally, COIMA HT (Human Technology) focuses on the digitalization of urban and real estate spaces, while COIMA Image specializes in architectural design.

== Notable assets ==
- Porta Nuova, in Milan. It includes iconic buildings such as the UniCredit Tower and the Torre Diamante, which were developed as part of a large urban regeneration project that transformed a former industrial area into a modern and sustainable neighborhood.
- Gioia 22 Tower, in Milan
- Torre Servizi Tecnici Comunali, in Milan
- I Portali, in Milan
- Feltrinelli Porta Volta, in Milan
- Corso Como Place, in Milan
- Scalo Romana, in Milan. It includes the Milan Olympic Village.
- Grand Hotel des Bains, in Venice
- Palazzo San Fedele, in Milan
- Palazzo Santa Margherita, in Milan
