= Piero Bottoni =

Italian architect and politician (1903–1973)

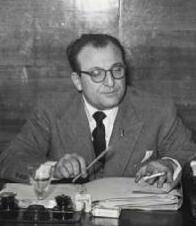
- Bottoni in 1951

Member of the National Council
- In office September 1945 – June 1946

Personal details
- Born: Pietro Bottoni; 11 July 1903 Milan, Kingdom of Italy
- Died: 9 April 1973 (aged 69) Milan, Italy
- Party: Italian Communist Party
- Occupation: Architect, urban planner

Piero Bottoni (11 July 1903 – 9 April 1973) was an Italian architect, urban planner and politician.

== Life and career ==
Piero Bottoni graduated in architecture in Milan in 1926. A key figure in Italian Rationalism, he served as the Italian delegate to the CIAM (Congrès Internationaux d'Architecture Moderne) from 1929 to 1949, and in 1933 contributed to drafting the Athens Charter, the manifesto of rationalist urban planning. In the same year, he was among the founders of the journal Quadrante.

Between the two World Wars, he took part in numerous urban design competitions and projects in Genoa, Verona, Milan, Piacenza, Como, Bologna, and Rome. He co-authored two significant plans in the history of Italian urbanism: the Aosta Valley Plan (1936), promoted by Adriano Olivetti, and the A.R. Plan (Architetti Riuniti, 1944–45).

He was also politically active: he joined the Italian Communist Party (PCI) in May 1943 and served in the National Council from September 1945 to June 1946. From 1956 to 1964, he was a member of the Milan City Council.

Bottoni taught at the Polytechnic University of Milan and the University of Trieste, becoming full professor of Urban Planning in 1967. He promoted the experimental QT8 district.

== Sources ==
- Casciato, Maristella (1988). "BOTTONI, Pietro". Dizionario Biografico degli Italiani. Vol. 34. Istituto dell'Enciclopedia Italiana.
- Ciucci, Giorgio; Muratore, Giorgio (2004). Storia dell'architettura italiana. Il primo Novecento. Milan: Electa.
- Paolo Portoghesi, ed. (1968). Dizionario enciclopedico di architettura e urbanistica. Vol. I. Rome: Gangemi. p. 404.
