= Ezio Cerutti =

Italian architect and urban planner (1911–1990)

- Born: 11 May 1911; Milan, Kingdom of Italy
- Died: 1990 (aged 78–79); Milan, Italy
- Education: Polytechnic University of Milan
- Occupations: Architect, urban planner, academic

Ezio Cerutti (11 May 1911 – 1990) was an Italian architect, urban planner and academic whose professional career was primarily centred in Lombardy between the 1930s and the 1970s.

== Career ==
Cerutti taught urban planning at the Polytechnic University of Milan. He maintained a close professional relationship with the architect and theorist Gustavo Giovannoni, one of the leading figures of Italian architecture during the first half of the 20th century.

During the late 1930s he entered several national architectural competitions, including those for the Government Palace in Savona and the Casa del Fascio in Sesto Calende. In collaboration with Aldo Putelli, he designed public housing plans for Milan, including projects for the D'Annunzio district and the Padre Reginaldo Giuliani housing competition. Together with Emilio Basletta, he also designed a recreational centre for the Ursus Gomma factory in Vigevano, while other projects included colonial housing in Addis Ababa and urban planning proposals for the redevelopment of central Asmara and the expansion of Monza.

Cerutti was actively involved in post-war debates on urban planning policy in Italy through his membership of the National Institute of Urban Planning (INU). In 1955 he participated in the INU conference convened in response to a proposal by Giulio Andreotti concerning the taxation of increases in real-estate values. Cerutti joined Giuseppe Samonà, Luigi Piccinato, Giovanni Astengo and Edoardo Detti in endorsing an alternative proposal based on the principles of the British Town and Country Planning system. On 13 December 1959 the INU National Council appointed Astengo and Samonà to prepare a comprehensive draft for a new Italian planning law. Cerutti served on the drafting commission alongside Piccinato, Camillo Ripamonti, Gianfilippo Delli Santi and Umberto Toschi. The commission's proposal was published on 28 November 1960 and formally presented at the VIII National Congress of the INU in Rome.

Cerutti designed several residential developments and planned neighbourhoods in the Milan metropolitan area. Among his best-known projects were the INA-Casa Baggio II housing development (1950–1953), designed with Aldo Putelli, Carlo Ceccucci and Franco Marescotti; the IACP Pompeo Castelli housing (1946–1952), designed with Putelli; and the INA-Casa Vialba housing development (1958–1965), designed with Putelli, Cesare Lacca, Giorgio Moro, Fausto Natoli and Carlo Rusconi Clerici. He also designed the Milanese churches of Santa Maria Liberatrice (1956–1958) and Gesù Divino Lavoratore (1965–1967). In 1964, he designed the Pordenone Courthouse and revised the city's master plan.

Alongside his architectural practice, Cerutti published teaching materials on urban planning and architecture, including the monograph Un trentennio di architettura ed urbanistica, 1933–1966, summarising more than three decades of professional activity.

== Archives ==
Cerutti's surviving architectural archive is preserved at the Centro Studi per la Storia dell'Architettura (Casa dei Crescenzi) in Rome. The collection comprises architectural drawings, photographic reproductions, reports and project documentation relating to thirteen architectural and urban planning projects, many of which were prepared for competitions or submitted to Gustavo Giovannoni for academic purposes. The archives were declared to be of significant historical interest by the Lazio Archival Superintendency on 2 April 1984.

== Sources ==
- Accorsi, Maria Letizia (2019). "I disegni dell'architetto Ezio Cerutti conservati presso il Centro di Studi per la Storia dell'Architettura. Nuove acquisizioni". Bollettino del Centro di Studi per la Storia dell'Architettura. n.s. (3): 91–104. ISSN 2531-7903.
- Ciccarelli, Lorenzo (2020). Il mito dell'equilibrio. Il dibattito anglo-italiano per il governo del territorio negli anni del dopoguerra. Milan: FrancoAngeli. pp. 54–56.
- Grandi, Maurizio; Pracchi, Attilio (1998). Milano. Guida all'architettura moderna. Bologna: Zanichelli. pp. 273, 276.
- Guccione, Massimo; Pesce, Daniela; Reale, Elisabetta, eds. (2007). Guida agli archivi di architettura a Roma e nel Lazio. Rome: Gangemi. p. 91.
- Simoncini, Giorgio; Bellanca, Claudia; Bonaccorso, Giuseppe; Manfredi, Tommaso; Zander, Maria Orietta, eds. (2002). Centro studi storia dell'architettura. Catalogo generale dei disegni d'architettura 1890–1947. Rome: Gangemi. pp. 181–184.
