= QT8 =

Coordinates: 45°29′10″N 9°08′14″E

- Quartiere of Milan
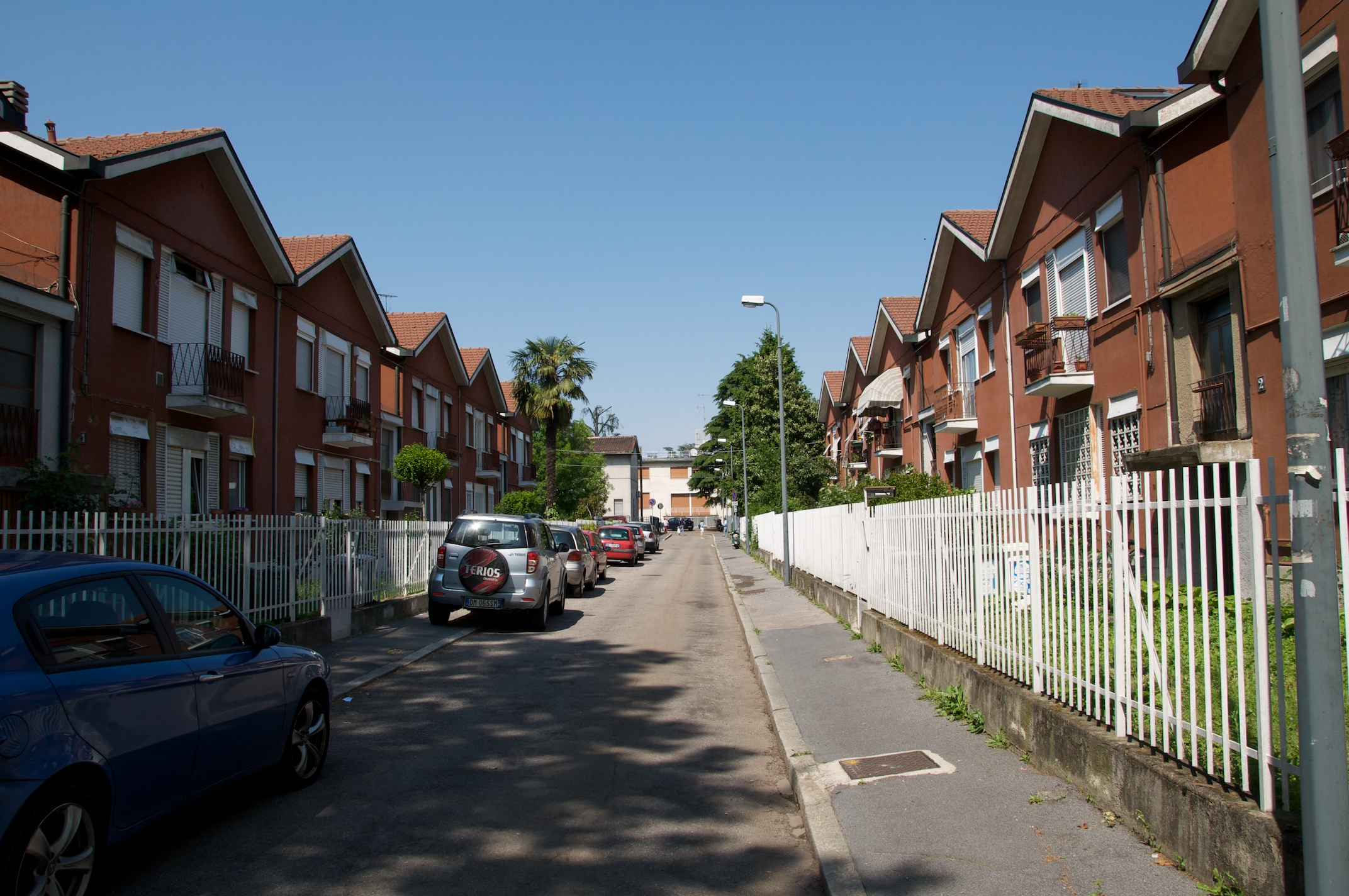
- Neighbourhood in QT8
- Interactive map of QT8
- Country: Italy
- Region: Lombardy
- Province: Milan
- Comune: Milan
- Zone: 8
- Time zone: UTC+1 (CET)
  - Summer (DST): UTC+2 (CEST)

QT8 is a district ("quartiere") of Milan, Italy, part of the Zone 8 administrative division of the city. The name formally stands for Quartiere Triennale 8, but the district is also simply referred to as QT8.

QT8 developed from an experimental urbanization project that was conceived during the 8th edition of the Triennale di Milano design exhibition that was held in 1947, at the beginning of the reconstruction of Milan after World War II. Architect Piero Bottoni was the main promoter of the project, which included the realization of Monte Stella, an artificial hill made from the debris of the buildings that had collapsed during the war.

Construction began in 1946 and 1947, with the reuse of several heterogeneous housing units. In 1948, the first four-story prefabricated houses in Italy were completed in QT8. Much effort was put into the realization of green areas such as playgrounds, neighbourhood gardens, and a 375,000 m^{2} city park. As a result, QT8 is one of the greenest districts in Milan.

The district is well connected to the city centre, by the Milan Metro as well as several bus lines.

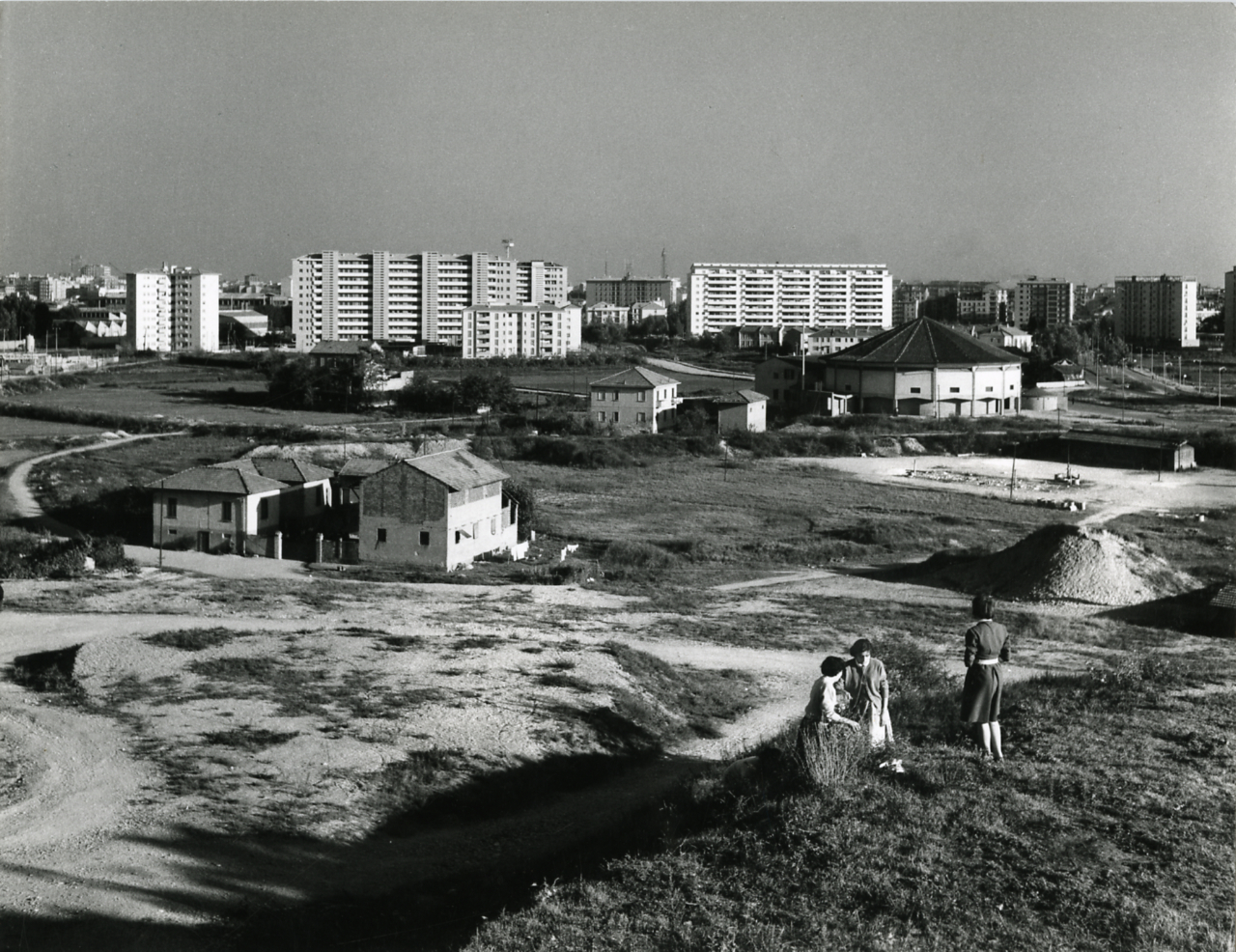
Archive photo showing modern housing in the distance and the Santa Maria Nascente church by Vico Magistretti and Mario Tedeschi (Paolo Monti photograph, 1960)

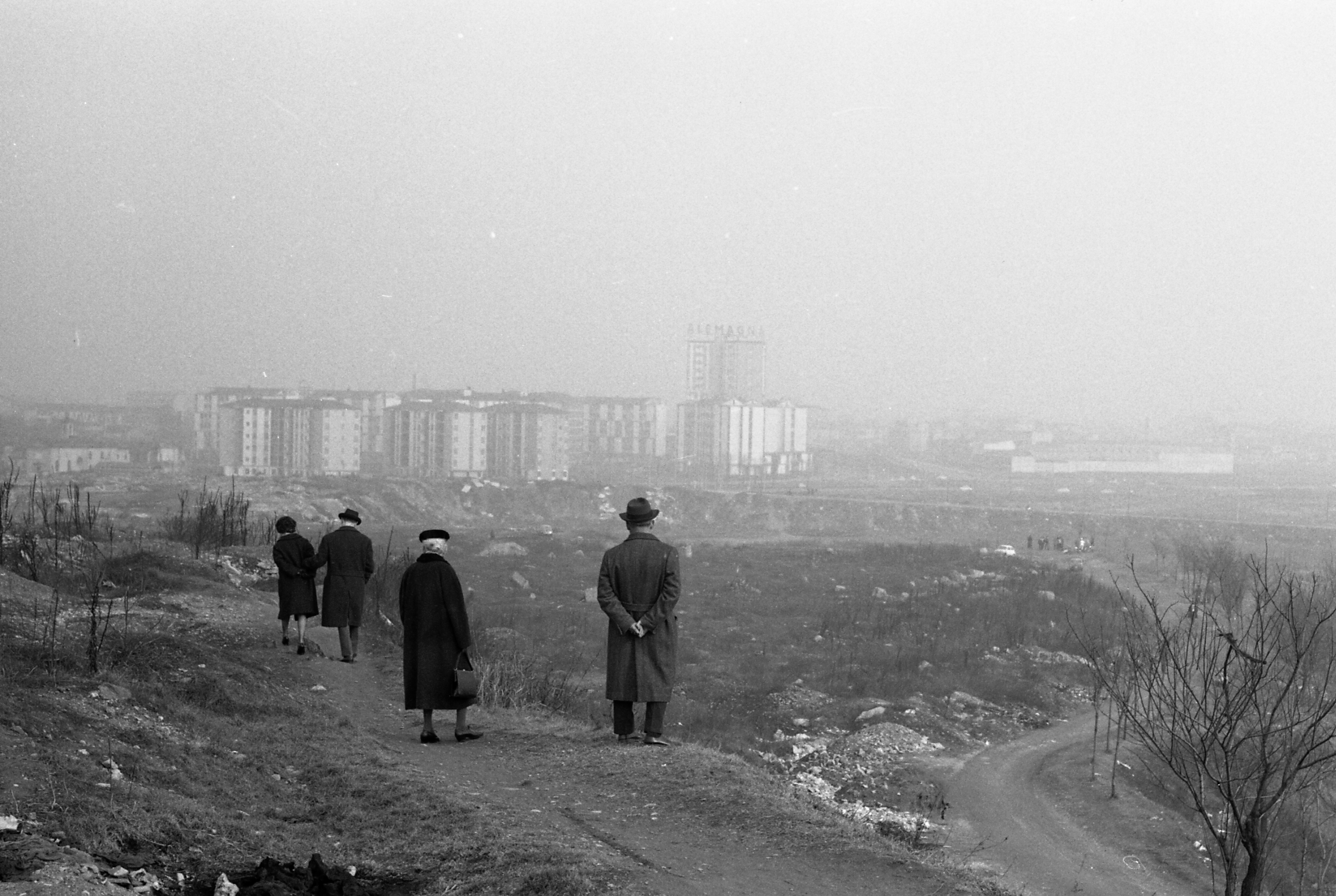
Another view of housing construction seen from Montagnetta di San Siro (Paolo Monti photograph, 1962)

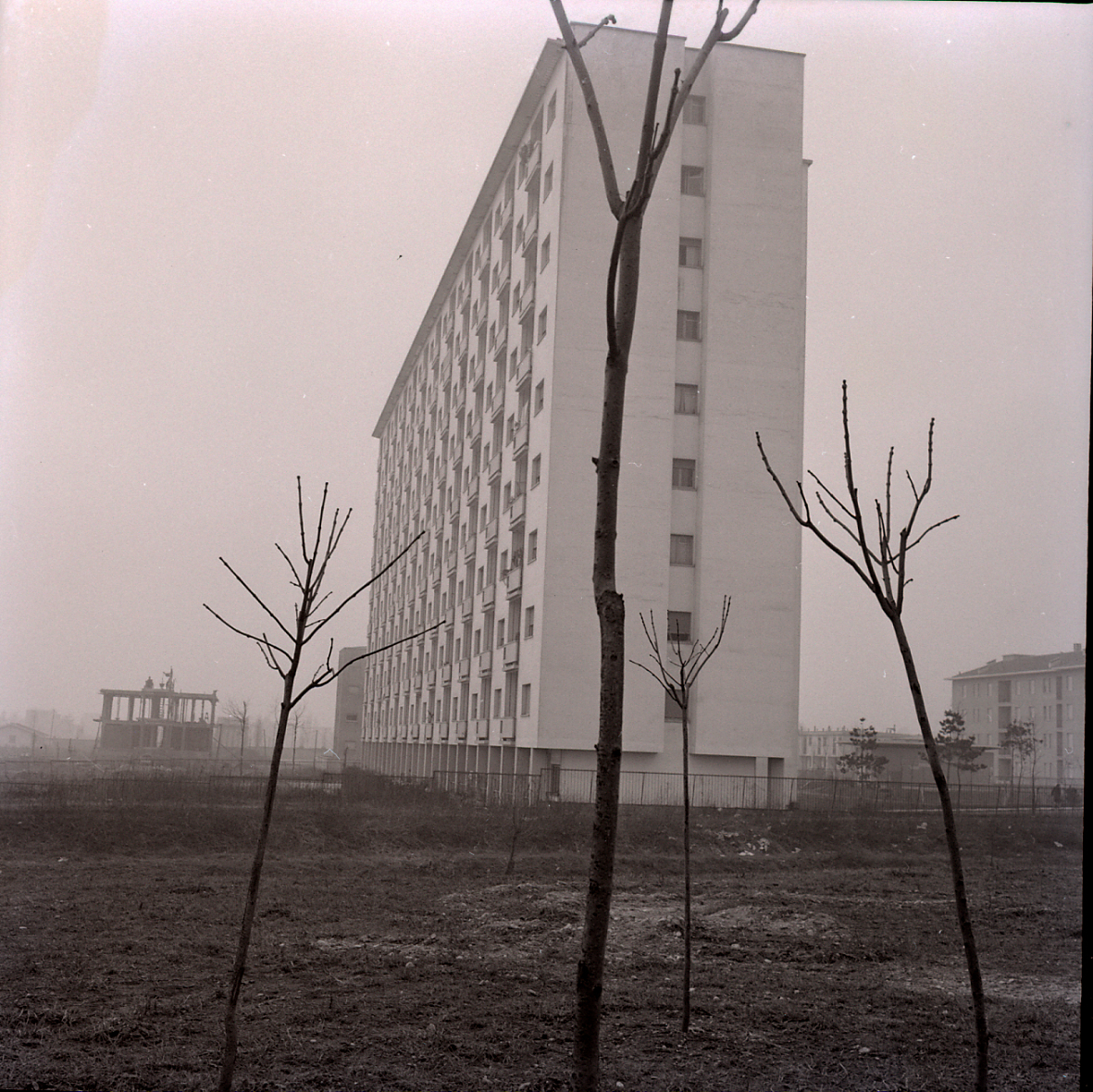
Via Giuseppe Pagano Pogatschnig 40 by Pietro Lingeri and Luigi Zuccoli (Paolo Monti photograph, 1970)

== References in popular culture ==
Premiata Forneria Marconi's Come ti va in riva alla città (1981) is a largely autobiographical concept album where singer-songwriter Franz Di Cioccio remembers his youth in the outskirts of Milan; QT8 is explicitly referenced in the eponymous song.
