= Istituto Autonomo Case Popolari =

Italian public housing authority

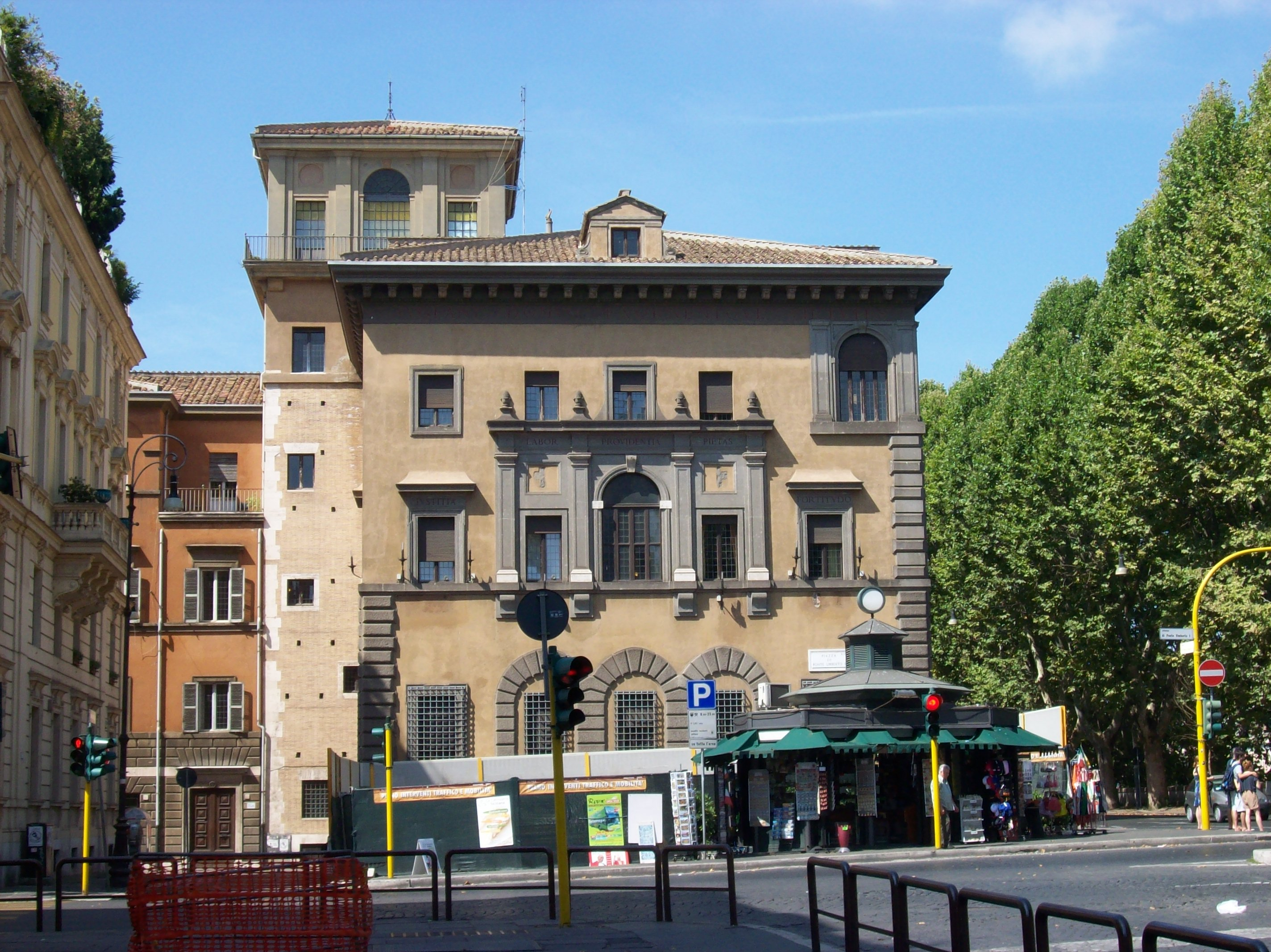
The IACP (now ATER) headquarters in Rome

The Istituto Autonomo Case Popolari (IACP; lit. 'Autonomous Institute for Public Housing') was a public housing authority in Italy responsible for the construction, management and maintenance of social housing.

The IACP succeeded the earlier Istituti per le Case Popolari (ICP), created following the 1903 Luzzatti Law. Established under Article 22 of the 1938 Consolidated Law on Public and Affordable Housing (Royal Decree No. 1165 of 28 April 1938), an IACP was created in each Italian province to provide affordable housing for low-income households.

Following regional reforms in the 1970s and 2000s, most IACP were reorganized into regional or local public housing agencies, often under different names, such as Azienda Territoriale per l'Edilizia Residenziale (ATER) or Azienda Casa.
