= Casabella =

Italian product design magazine

Casabella Mondadori Logo

Casabella is a monthly Italian architectural and product design magazine with a focus on modern, radical design and architecture. It includes interviews with the world's most prominent architects.

== History and profile ==
Casabella was founded in 1928 at Milan by Guido Marangoni. Its initial name was La Casa Bella (The Beautiful Home). In 1933, the architect Giuseppe Pagano became editor, changing the name to Casabella. Subsequently, the architect Ernesto Nathan Rogers, who edited the magazine from 1953 to 1965, changed the name further to Casabella Continuità, Casabella Costruzioni, Costruzioni Casabella, and, after the departure of Rogers, Casabella.

During its history, Casabella featured many important architects and designers, including Franco Albini, Gae Aulenti, and Marco Zanuso, contributing as creative editors. It has also published some articles written by Barry Bergdoll, curator at the Department of Architecture and Design of The Museum of Modern Art (MOMA) of New York City. Semiotician Giovanni Klaus Koenig also worked for the journal.

After being edited by Vittorio Gregotti between 1981 and 1996, the magazine's editorial helm has been taken over by Francesco Dal Co. It is published by Gruppo Mondadori with a 2014 circulation of 45,000 copies.

== Gallery ==
La casa bella, n. 6, June 1929

Casabella #471, July–August 1981

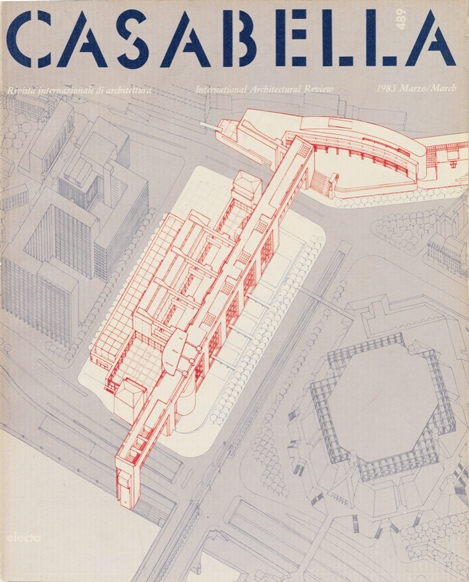
Casabella #489 March 1983

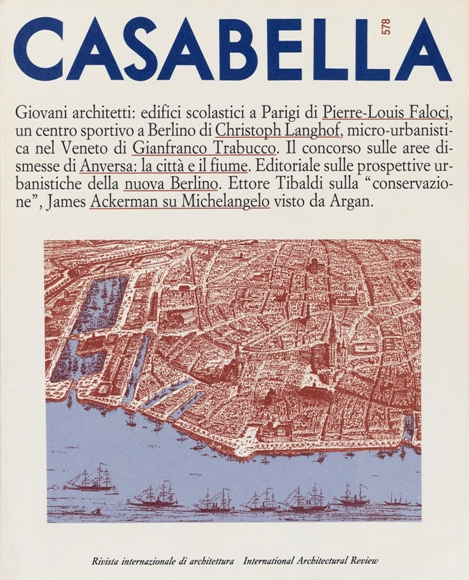
Casabella #578 April 1991

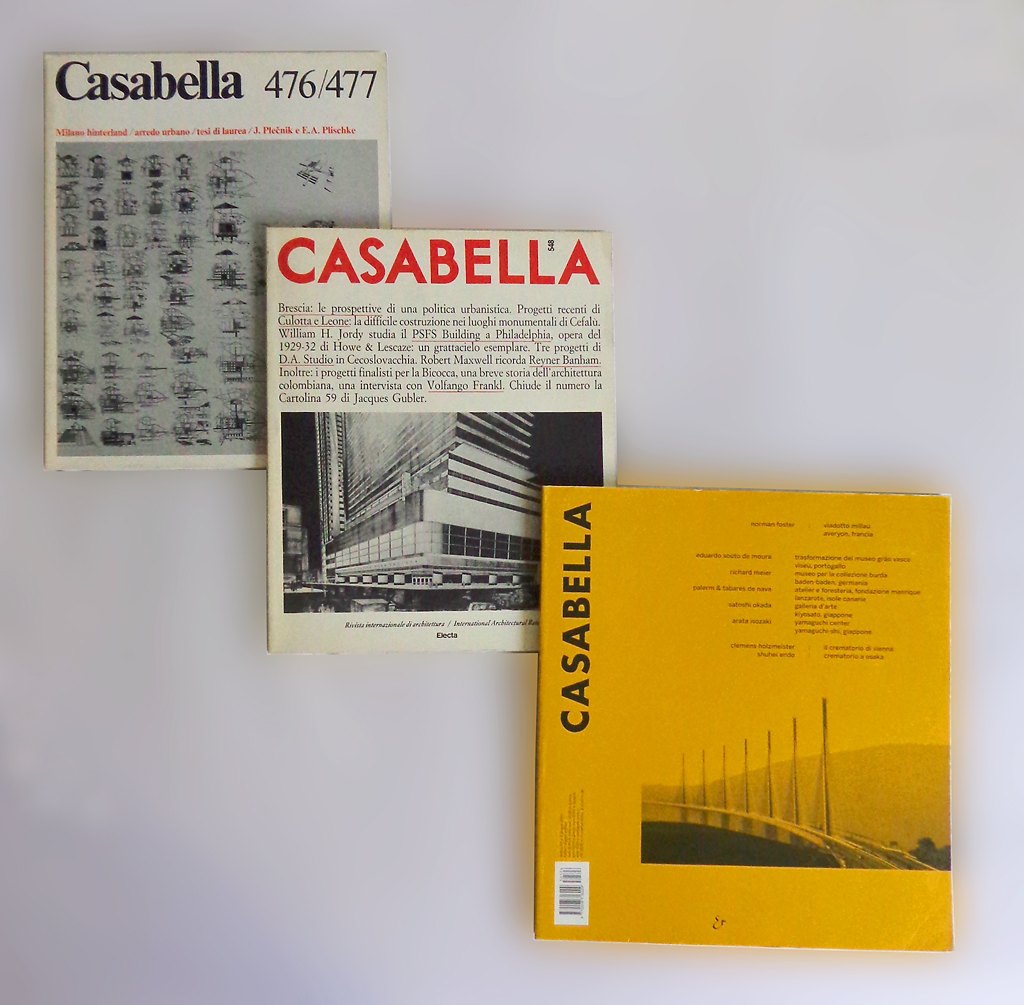
Riviste Casabella

== See also ==
- List of magazines published in Italy
