= Pasquale Carbonara =

Italian architect

- Born: 10 September 1910; Triggiano, Province of Bari, Kingdom of Italy
- Died: 1998 (aged 87–88); Noci, Province of Bari, Apulia, Italy
- Occupations: Architect, urban planner

Pasquale Carbonara (10 September 1910 – 1998) was an Italian architect and urban planner, known for his theoretical contributions to the concept of housing, on building typologies, and on construction methodologies, being one of the first in Italy.

== Life and career ==
Born in 1910 in Triggiano, in the province of Bari, Carbonara graduated in 1933 from the Faculty of Architecture in Rome and obtained a doctorate in architecture from Columbia University in New York. Starting in 1937, he served as an assistant in the chair of "Building characteristics" in Rome, and in 1940, he became a full professor.

In the 1930s, he collaborated with the fascist magazine Architettura, writing articles on construction in the United States and South America, as well as on urban planning in Sweden. He published the book L'architettura in America ("Architecture in America") in 1939. He was also the technical director of the excavations at Cyrene and a consultant to the Italian-Libyan government for the construction of rural villages between 1934 and 1935.

After the war, he was a professor of "Building characteristics" at the Faculty of Architecture in Rome from 1946 to 1985. In 1946, he contributed to the Manuale dell'architetto ("Architect's Manual"), the first work in Italy to establish a standardized methodology for construction.

Starting from 1954, he published his most notable work, Architettura pratica ("Practical architecture"), organized into five volumes according to a strictly typological criterion.

Among his works as an architect are the Mangiagalli II neighborhood in Milan (1950), the new Turin National University Library (1957–1973), the church of San Damaso Papa in Monteverde (1957–1969), the Italian National Olympic Committee headquarters on Viale Tiziano in Rome (1959), and various villas on Via Appiano for the Società Generale Immobiliare.

Carbonara was also very active in his native Apulia, designing prominent buildings in Bari such as the local headquarters of the Banca Nazionale dell'Agricoltura (1955), the Bari Courthouse (1957–1959), the CEP neighborhood (1959), the church of San Pasquale Baylon (1960), the Law Faculty of the University of Bari (1964–1970), and the "Di Cagno Abbrescia" Institute (1972). He also designed residential and commercial buildings in Noci (1950), the Pretura in Putignano (1960), the Barletta Town Hall (1960), and hospitals in Grottaglie, Galatina, and Nardò (1956–1966).

== Sources ==
- Mannino, Natalina (2001). Pasquale Carbonara architetto e l'insegnamento dei "Caratteri degli edifici". Rome: Gangemi.
- Sgarbi, Vittorio (2022). "Carbonara, Pasquale". Roma dal Rinascimento ai giorni nostri. Milan: La Nave di Teseo.
