= Foggia Courthouse =

Judiciary building in Foggia, Italy

- Interactive map of the Foggia Courthouse area

General information
- Location: Foggia, Apulia, Italy
- Coordinates: 41°26′57.32″N 15°32′54.18″E
- Construction started: 1981
- Completed: 1989

Design and construction
- Architect: Pierluigi Spadolini

The Foggia Courthouse (Italian: Palazzo di Giustizia di Foggia, lit. 'Palace of Justice of Foggia') is a judicial complex located on Viale Primo Maggio in Foggia, Italy.

== History ==
The courthouse was built starting in 1981 based on the design by architect Pierluigi Spadolini. It was inaugurated in 1989. Prior to this, the court's seat had been located since 1923 in the building on Largo Papa Giovanni Paolo II, which was later repurposed as the University of Foggia's headquarters.

== Description ==
The building is located in the southern sector of the city. It is characterized by an elliptical geometry, with tapered ends. This continuous curved body is lower and features a light-colored façade achieved through prefabricated reinforced concrete panels with a striated finish. Long windows run along the entire perimeter of the building, enlarging towards the short sides, to the east and west. Attached to this body is a dark-colored structure composed of two thicker bars orthogonal to each other.

The upper building has a continuous curtain wall façade, segmented by mullions and horizontal elements in metal, filled in between with the same material around the windows. The entire complex is embedded into an artificial hill, which provides service access points and storage areas.

== Critical reception ==
The building is part of a series of courthouses designed by the architect Spadolini during the 1980s and 1990s—alongside those in Siena, Ravenna, Reggio Emilia, and Turin—and, according to critics, represents a key development in the evolution in Italy of this architectural typology on which Spadolini specialized.

According to Koenig (1993): "The suggestions, constraints, and innovations offered by technology or production become opportunities to rethink and reformulate the initial idea [...]. The continuous feedback process of industrial practice is, for Spadolini, an inherent way of thinking".

== Sources ==
- Koenig, Giovanni Klaus (1993). Pierluigi Spadolini, architettura e sistema. Dedalo.
- Francesco Gurrieri, ed. (1988). Pierluigi Spadolini. Umanesimo e tecnologia. Milan: Electa.
- Vitta, Maurizio (1993). Pierluigi Spadolini e associati: architetture 1953-1993. Milan: L'Arcaedizioni.
