= Cini Boeri =

Italian architect and designer (1924–2020)

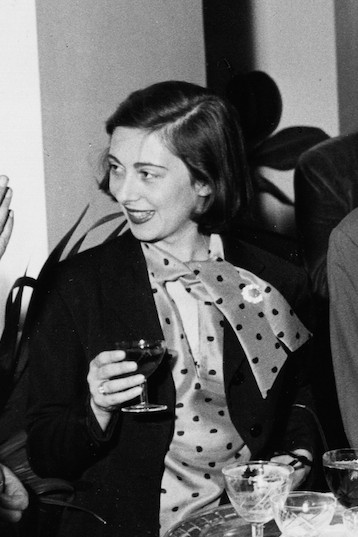
- Boeri in 1954
- Born: Maria Cristina Mariani Dameno; 19 June 1924; Milan, Italy
- Died: 9 September 2020 (aged 96); Milan, Italy
- Education: Politecnico di Milano
- Known for: Architecture, interior design, and industrial design
- Notable work: Ghost armchair
- Awards: Grand Officer of the Order of Merit of the Italian Republic; Compasso d'Oro; Ambrogino d'oro
- Website: ciniboeriarchitetti.com

Maria Cristina Mariani Dameno (19 June 1924 – 9 September 2020), known as Cini Boeri, was an Italian architect and designer. She was considered "one of the great pioneering women in Italian design and architecture", who was described by Paola Antonelli as a "formidable architect and designer [and] paragon of Milanese elegance and verve."

== Early life and education ==
Cini Boeri was born in 1924. She grew up in Milan and earned her degree in architecture from the Polytechnic University of Milan in 1951 – one of only three female graduates that year. At that time, there were more female interior designers than architects in Italy because it was thought that women were too fragile to work outside.

== Work and career ==
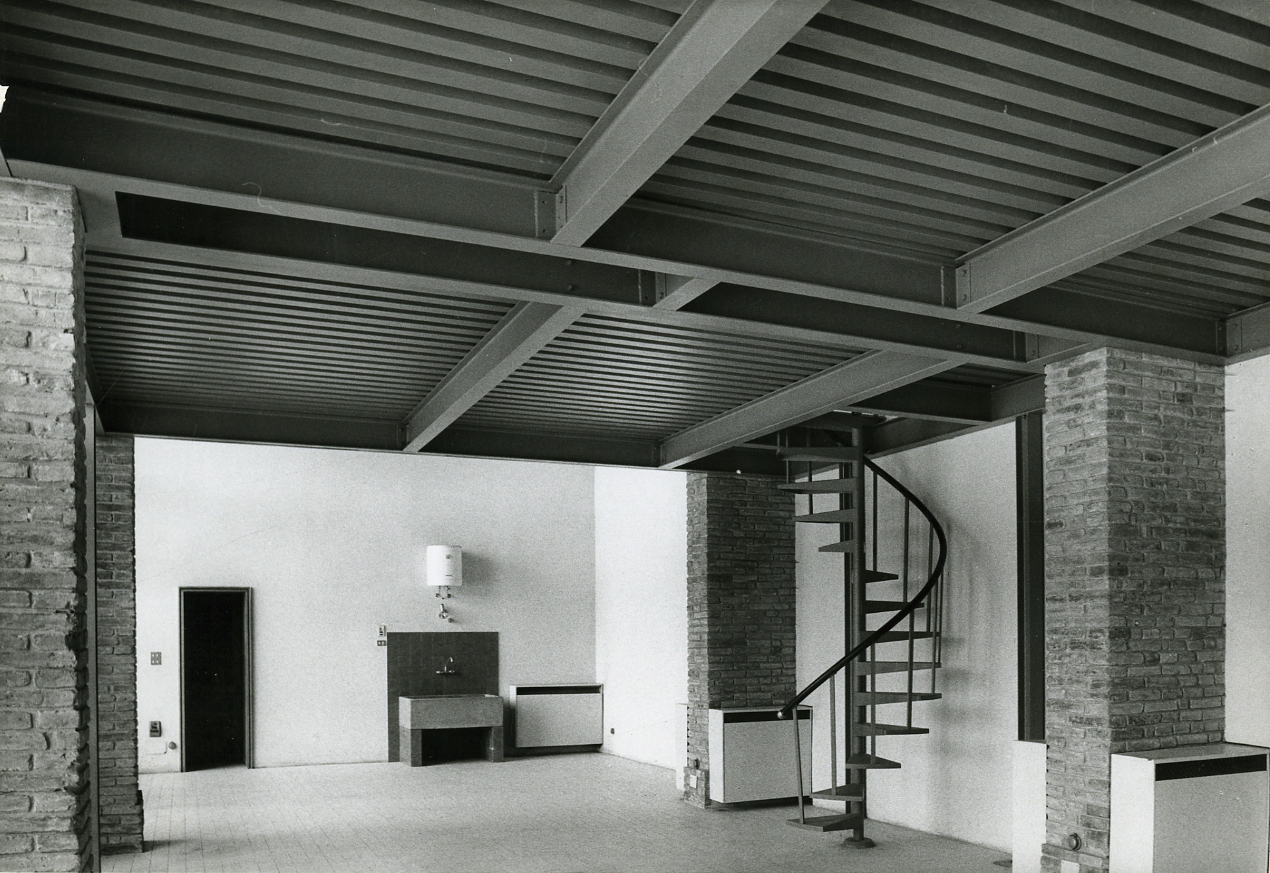
At the Palazzo dei Diamanti, Ferrara. A design created by Cini Boeri in collaboration with Marco Zanuso

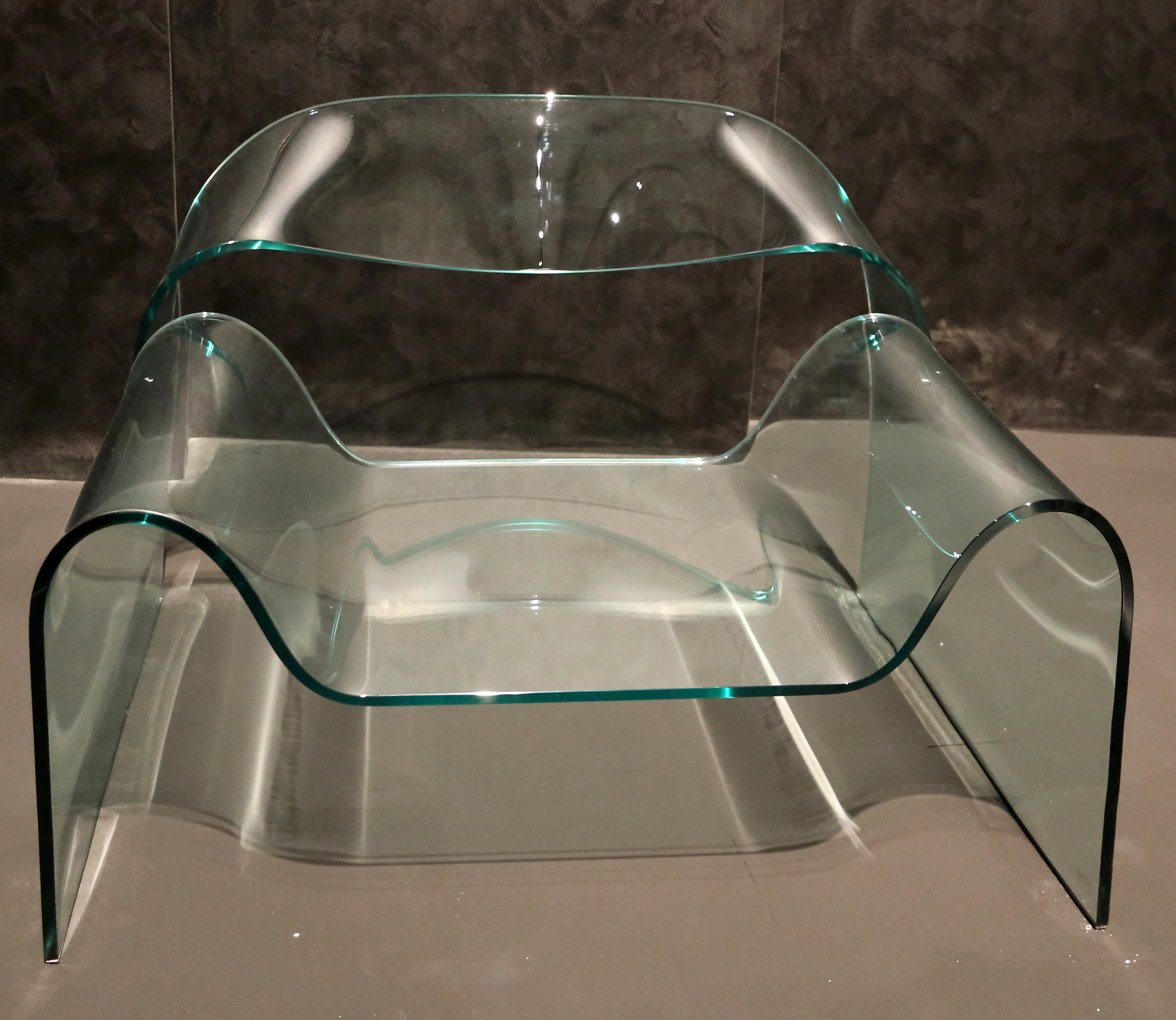
Ghost chair designd for Fiam, in collaboration with Tomu Katayanagi (1987)

After a brief experience working with Gio Ponti, a famous master of Italian design and architecture, she worked with Marco Zanuso, another acclaimed architect and designer, from 1951 through 1963, after which she started an independent architectural practice. In 1963 she opened her own studio in Milan focusing on architecture, interior, and exhibit design both in Italy and abroad.

In the 1970s, Boeri began designing showrooms for Knoll in Europe and America. She also designed a variety of sofas and chairs for the company, some of which are still in production today. In addition, she worked for a variety of other design companies, including lighting company Artemide, furniture companies such as Arflex, Knoll, and Magis, and the housewares company Rosenthal.

From 1981 to 1983 she taught architectural planning and industrial design at the Politecnico University in Milan.

Different examples of her work can be found in museums and international exhibitions.

During the 1960s, Cini Boeri completed a series of residential projects in Sardinia. Notable among these were Casa Bunker, a brutalist structure situated atop a cliff, and Villa Rotonda, an elegantly designed snail-shaped residence. Both projects were carefully crafted to establish a harmonious dialogue with the surrounding landscapes, reflecting Cini Boeri's sensitivity to the environment and her ability to integrate architecture seamlessly into nature.

Between the 1960 to 1970, she challenged a lot in popular philosophy of comfort, and focused on its form.

Another notable project, Casa nel bosco from 1969, was nestled within a birch forest in Lombardy. Here, Cini Boeri's ingenuity was evident in the fragmented architecture, made in that style to avoid the need to fell the large trees encircling the site. This approach showcased her deep appreciation for the natural surroundings and her commitment to sustainable and considerate design.

=== Design ===
- 1964 Borgogna armchair (Arflex)
- 1967 Bobo and Cubotto one-piece armchair (Arflex)
- 1967 ABS luggage set (Franzi)
- 1968 Bengodi sofa (Arflex)
- 1970 Lunario table and Gradual sofa (Knoll)
- 1971 Serpentone sofa (Arflex)
- 1972 Strips sofa (Arflex)
- 1972 Cibi glasses and crystal decorative objects
- 1973 Lucetta desk lamp (Stilnovo)
- 1976 Talete table (Arflex)
- 1977 Brigadier armchair (Knoll)
- 1980 Double face revolving bookcase (Arflex)
- 1982 Tre B handles (Fusital)
- 1982 Dito desk table (Tronconi)
- 1982 Rever door (Tre-P Tre-Più)
- 1983 Malibu table (Arflex)
- 1983 prefabricated house (Misawa Homes, Tokyo)
- 1987 Ghost armchair (Fiam Italia)
- 1989 Steps drawer (Estel)
- 1989 Feltro chandelier (Venini)
- 2007 To the wall bookcase (Magis)
- 2011 Bebop sofa (Poltrona Frau)

=== Architecture ===
- 1966–67 Holiday house in Punta Cannone (La Maddalena, Italy)
- 1967 Holiday house on Abbataggia gulf (La Maddalena, Italy)
- 1970 Museum house of Antonio Gramsci in Ghilarza (Oristano Italy)
- 1976 Restoration of Palazzo Forti (Verona, Italy)
- 1990 Country house (Piacenza, Italy)
- 1997 EDS office building (Rome, Italy)
- 2003/2004 Holiday house on Abbataggia gulf (La Maddalena, Italy)
- 2007 Museum of the Duomo treasure (Monza, Italy)

== Death ==
Boeri died on 9 September 2020 in Milan, Italy at the age of 96.

== Influences ==
Cini Boeri's impact on the world of design extended beyond her furniture pieces, as much of her work remains in production today due to the modular and functional nature of her designs.

== Prizes and awards ==
Boeri was awarded many prizes; among those, in 1979 a Compasso d'Oro for her "Strips" sofa system for arflex, and a Lifetime Achievement Award from the Italian Cultural Institute of Los Angeles in 2008. She was made a Grande Ufficiale Ordine al Merito della Repubblica Italiana in 2011, and was awarded the Ambrogino d'oro Gold Medal from the city of Milan in 2019.

- 1979 Compasso d'Oro award
- 2011 Compasso d'Oro Career Award
- 2011 Grand Officer of the Order of Merit of the Italian Republic
- 2012 Nominata Socio Onorario ADI
- 2019 Ambrogino d'oro
- 2022 (posthumous) Compasso d’Oro "alla Carriera del Prodotto"
