= Pierluigi Spadolini =

Italian architect

- Born: 5 April 1922; Florence, Kingdom of Italy
- Died: 8 June 2000 (aged 78); Florence, Italy
- Education: University of Florence
- Occupation: Architect

Pierluigi Spadolini (5 April 1922 – 8 June 2000) was an Italian architect and industrial designer.

== Life and career ==
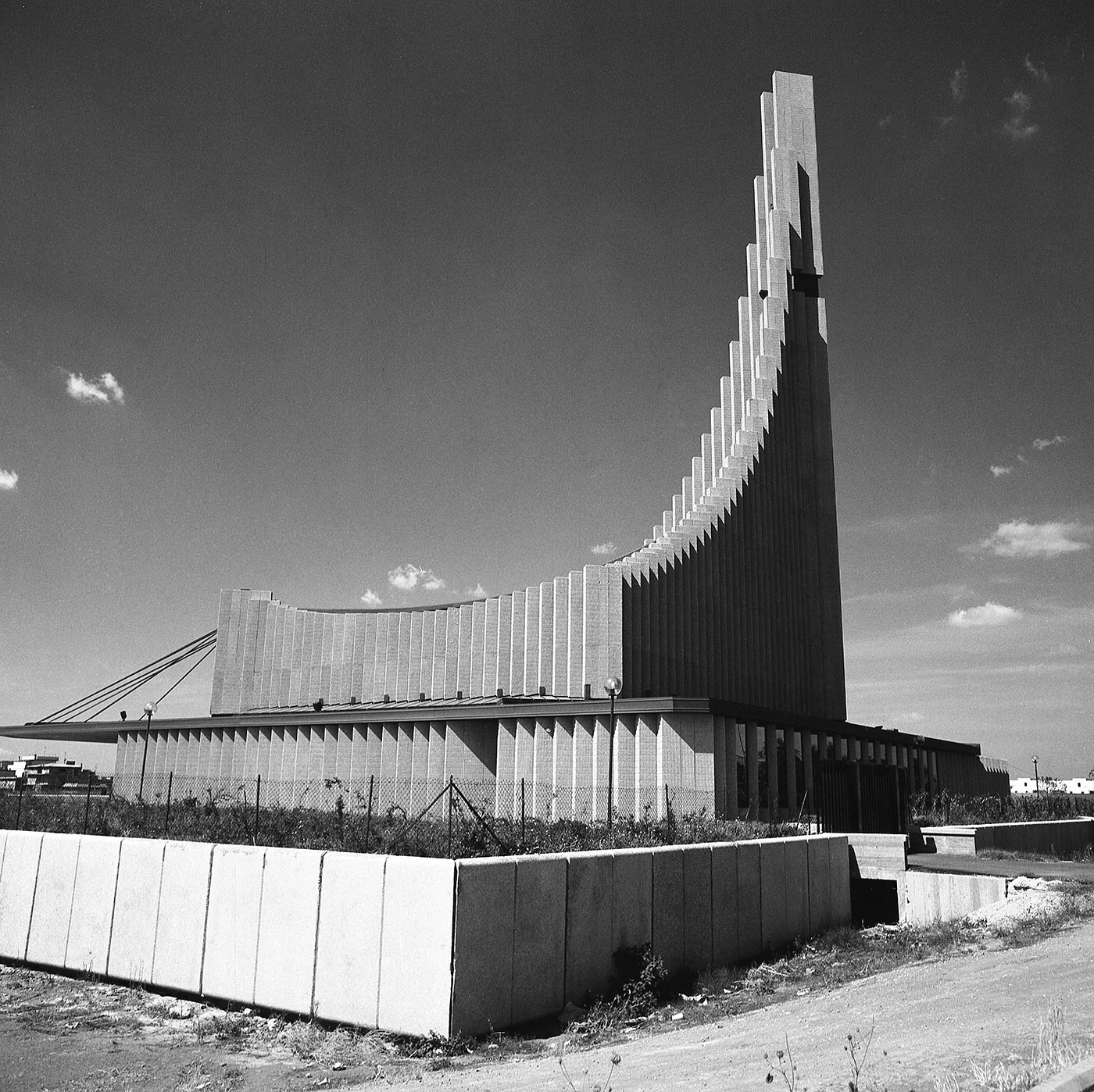
The church of Santa Maria del Redentore in Tor Bella Monaca, Rome

Born in Florence, he was the son of the painter Guido Spadolini and the older brother of the politician Giovanni, prime minister of Italy in the early 1980s.

Spadolini attended the local Faculty of Architecture while working in the studio of Raffaello Fagnoni. He graduated in 1952 and began his independent activity as an architect, creating numerous works in the fields of public and private construction. He initially served as a design consultant for industrial products such as radios, televisions, and household appliances for Magneti Marchi, LESA, and Autovox; for electromechanical medical devices for OTE Biomedica; for furniture for Arflex and Kartell; and for recreational boats at the Naval Shipyards of Pisa.

In 1954, Spadolini moved to Milan, where he became involved with the Milan Triennial and collaborated on the editorial team of Casabella, directed by Ernesto Nathan Rogers. He was a full professor of Architectural Composition at Florence University and the Director of the Institute of Constructions and the Institute of Special Technologies, and was among the founders of the chair of Artistic Design for Industry.

In 1981, Spadolini was a member of the jury for the Compasso d'Oro. He won the same award in 1987, for the project of the MPL ready-to-use housing unit, developed by EdilPro-Italstat.

In 1988, he founded the studio Spadolini & Associates with his son Guido Lorenzo. In 1989, he organized and participated in a series of lectures in Moscow for officials of the Ministry of Public Works of the Soviet Union, which culminated in the conference "Architecture and System".

In 1992, he received the IN-ARCH national award for the design of the new corporate headquarters of Assicurazioni Generali. In the same year, he took part in the Sacred Architecture Exhibition at the Venice Biennale of Architecture.

== Works (selection) ==
- Casa del Turista for the Florence Tourism Authority, Montepiano (1953–1954)
- Church of Santa Maria Assunta, Montecatini Terme (1953–1958, with Raffaello Fagnoni, Mario Negri and Alfonso Stocchetti)
- Headquarters of the National Injury Prevention Agency, Florence (1956–1957)
- Residential buildings in La Rosa, Livorno (1958–1962)
- Headquarters of the National Health Insurance Institute, Siena (1960–1963)
- La Nazione Building, Florence (1961–1966)
- Residential complex Le Torri, Colle di Val d'Elsa (1962–1963)
- Palazzo degli Affari, Florence (1964–1974)
- Spadolini Pavilion in Fortezza da Basso, Florence (1974–1976)
- Palazzo dei Congressi and the Faculty of Economics and Commerce at the University of Pisa, Pisa (1976–1984)
- Siena Courthouse, Siena (1980)
- Ravenna Courthouse, Ravenna (1980)
- Foggia Courthouse, Foggia (1981)
- Assicurazioni Generali Corporate Headquarters, Mogliano Veneto (1981–1988)
- Greenway at the Naples Business District (1984)
- Reggio Emilia Courthouse, Reggio Emilia (1984–1992)
- Church of Santa Maria del Redentore in Tor Bella Monaca, Rome (1986)
- Church of San Carlo Borromeo, Naples (1990)
- Italy Pavilion at Expo 1992, Seville (1991–1992, with Gae Aulenti)

He also collaborated as an external consultant on the design of the Turin Courthouse, working with Ezio Ingaramo and Enzo Zacchiroli (1990–2000).

== Sources ==
- Elisabetta Insabato; Cecilia Ghelli, eds. (2007). Guida agli archivi di architetti e ingegneri del Novecento in Toscana. Florence: Edifir.
- Francesco Gurrieri, ed. (1988). Pierluigi Spadolini. Umanesimo e tecnologia. Milan: Electa.
- Maurizio Vitta, ed. (1993). Pierluigi Spadolini e associati. Architetture 1953-1993. Milan: L'Arca.
