= Franzi =

Italian luggage manufacturer

Valigeria Franzi
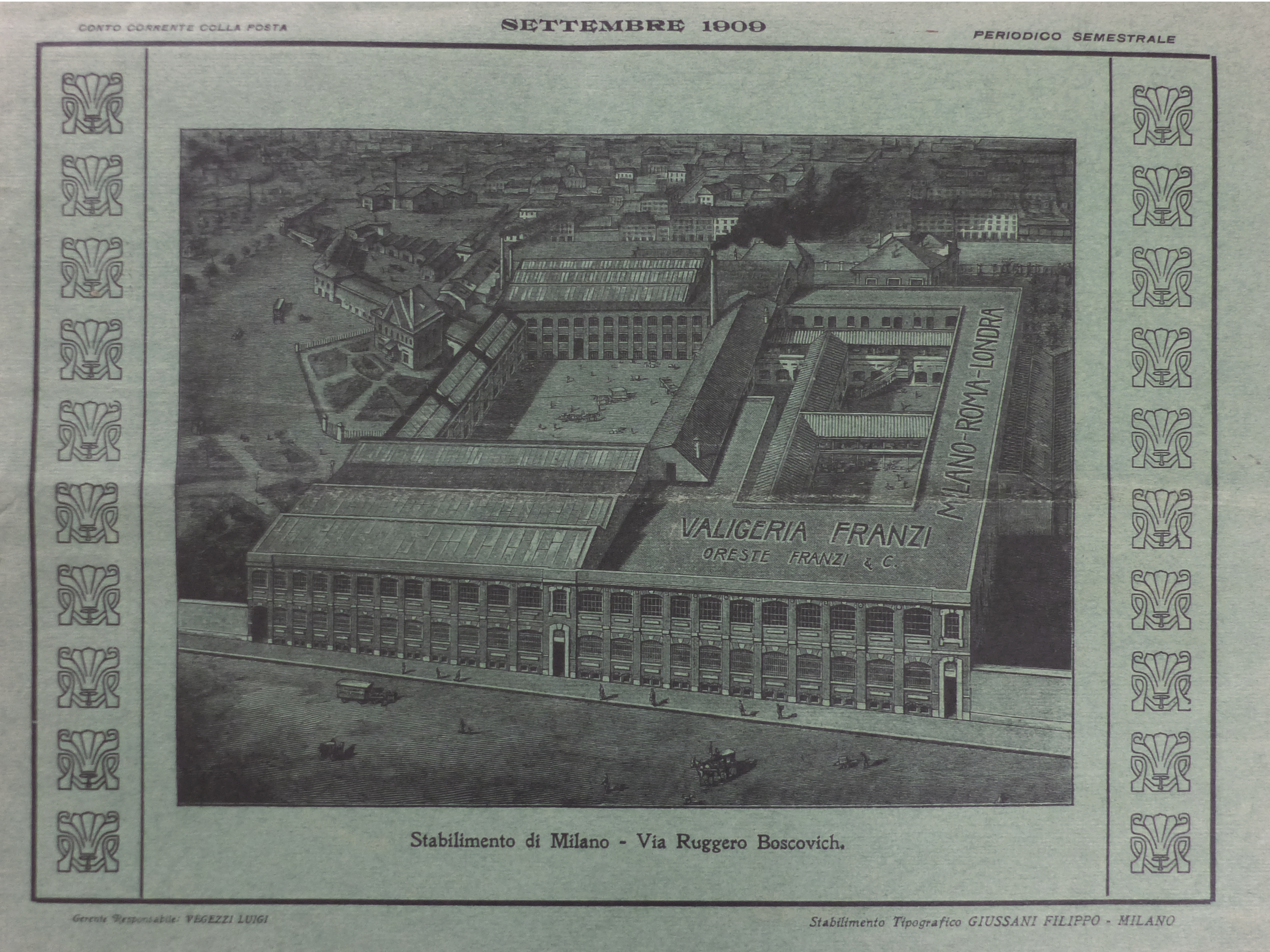
- The premises of the company in 1909
- Type: private company; listed company, 1905–1909
- Industry: leather goods
- Founded: 1864, Milan, Italy
- Founder: Rocco Franzi
- Headquarters: Milan, Italy
- Products: leather luggage

The Valigeria Franzi is an Italian manufacturer of leather bags and luggage started in Milan in 1864 by Rocco Franzi.

== History ==
By the early twentieth century, it was a supplier to royalty and nobility. It was listed on the Milan stock exchange from 1905 to 1909. Guccio Gucci worked for the company until he set up Gucci in 1921.

The company mostly used English leather, but also produced some at the Conceria Monzese in Monza, which it owned. This was marketed as "Cuoio Franzi".

In 1967 Franzi manufactured a suitcase, "Partner", designed by Cini Boeri and made from two half-shells of aluminium and ABS resin.

The company went into liquidation in 1978, and a new company, Oreste Franzi & Co., was set up. It closed in 1998.

== Refounding and Relaunch in 2021 ==
In 2021, entrepreneur Marco Calzoni acquired the brand to restart the operational production of both classic and new models, continuing the company’s traditional business. In 2026, a handbag model named "Carla", created as a tribute to Carla Fracci, was unveiled and made available for purchase at the Printemps department store chain in Paris.
