= Arflex =

Italian furniture company

- Type: Privately held company
- Industry: Furnitures
- Founded: 1948
- Headquarters: Italy
- Area served: Worldwide
- Website: http://www.arflex.com

Arflex is an Italian company that makes and sells contemporary furniture.

== History ==
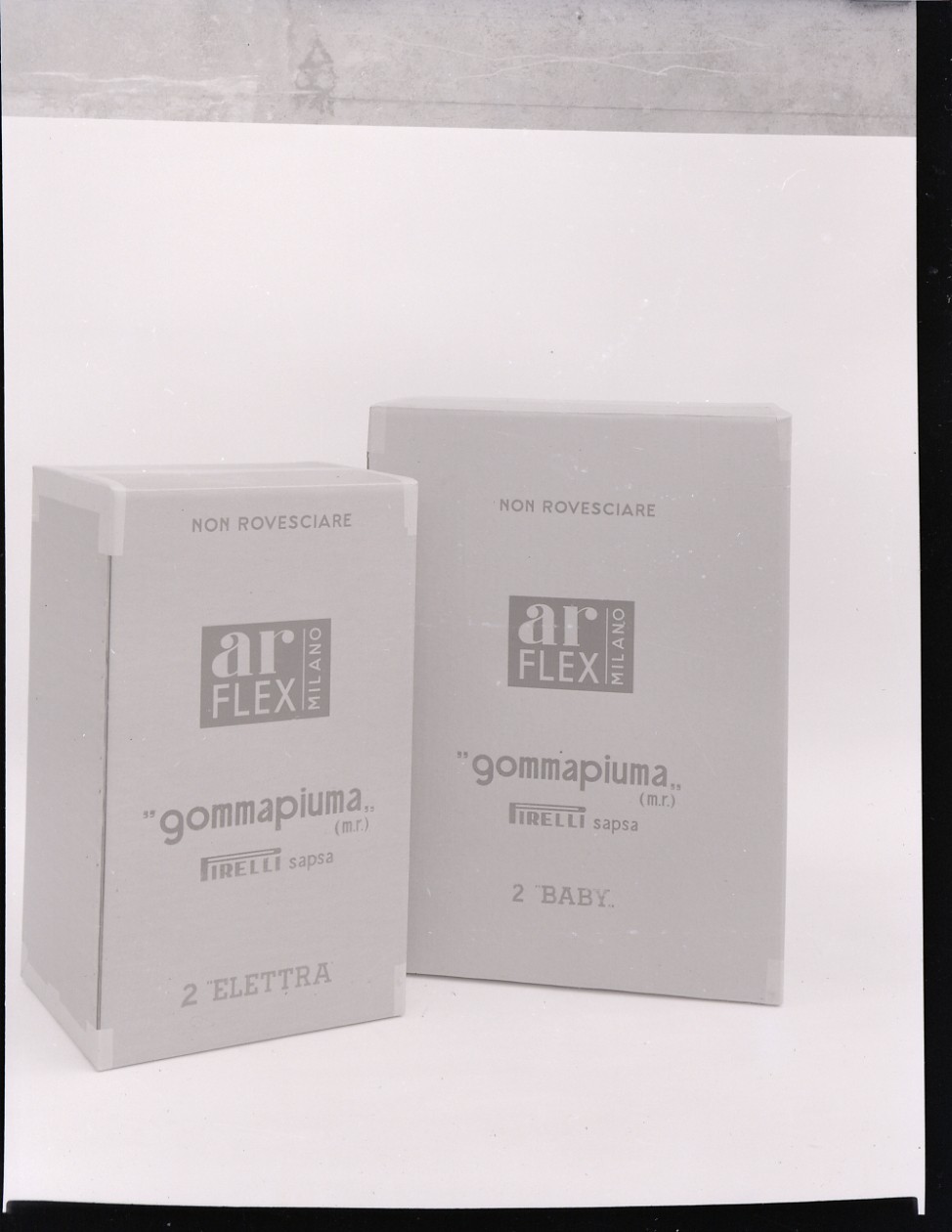
Foam rubber Arflex. By Paolo Monti photographer, 1975.

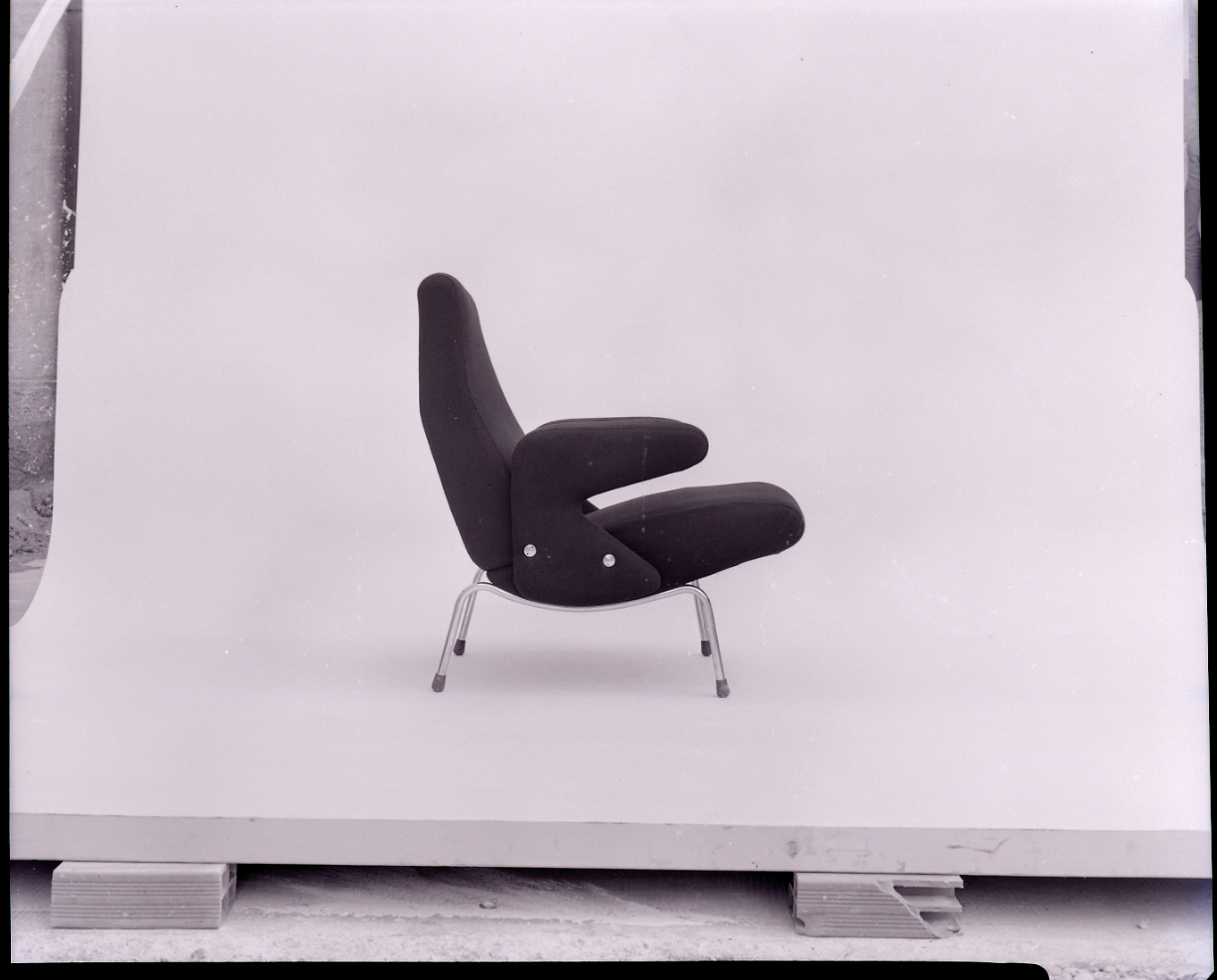
Armchair by Arflex. By Paolo Monti photographer, 1975.

In 1947, after the war, a group of researchers and entrepreneurs began to work on two new upholstering materials, foam rubber and elastic tape made by Pirelli, which had a range of possible uses in interior furnishings. They presented the technical specifications of the new products to Marco Zanuso, who initiated a trial operations programme until 1950.

Between 1951 and 1954, Arflex produced various models of car seat designed by Carlo Barassi using foam rubber and elastic tape, which could replace standard production seats and offer more comfort, with removable covers and adjustable seatbacks. The most successful of the car seats were the "MilleMiglia" and the "Sedile Lettino", a seat that could be turned into a makeshift bed. Both were designed for the Fiat Topolino.

Zanuso became an influential designer in post-war Italy, associated with the ideology of the Modern Movement. Other designers who contributed to the Arflex range included: Franco Albini, Giancarlo De Carlo, Belgiojoso, Enrico Peressutti, Joe Colombo, Ambrogio Casati, Spadolini, Cini Boeri, Michele De Lucchi, Ettore Sottsass, Marco Piva, and Pieter De Bruyne.

== See also ==
- List of Italian companies
