= Enzo Zacchiroli =

Italian architect

- Born: 13 December 1919; Bologna, Kingdom of Italy
- Died: 9 March 2010 (aged 90); Bologna, Italy
- Education: University of Florence
- Occupation: Architect

Enzo Zacchiroli (13 December 1919 – 9 March 2010) was an Italian architect, a representative of organic architecture, and a prominent figure in Bologna's architectural scene, drawing inspiration from the works of Frank Lloyd Wright and Alvar Aalto.

== Life and career ==
Zacchiroli was born in Bologna on Via Fondazza, near the studio of the painter Giorgio Morandi, who encouraged him towards a professional career. In 1938, he enrolled at the Faculty of Architecture in Florence, graduating in 1951, and he taught until 1955 as an assistant to Giuseppe Giorgio Gori and Adalberto Libera.

After collaborating with the Bologna Urban Planning Office, he opened his own studio in 1958. His first significant project was the headquarters of Johns Hopkins University in Bologna (1956-1960), which earned him the In/ARCH Award in 1961 and reflects Alvar Aalto's influence. He designed numerous public and private works, many of which gained international recognition, and maintained a close relationship with Bologna, despite occasional opposition due to the modern and innovative character of his architecture. Since 1981, he was a member of the Accademia di San Luca.

In the 1990s he designed the Turin Courthouse, together with Ezio Ingaramo and the collaboration of Pierluigi Spadolini.

He died in March 2010 at the age of 90.

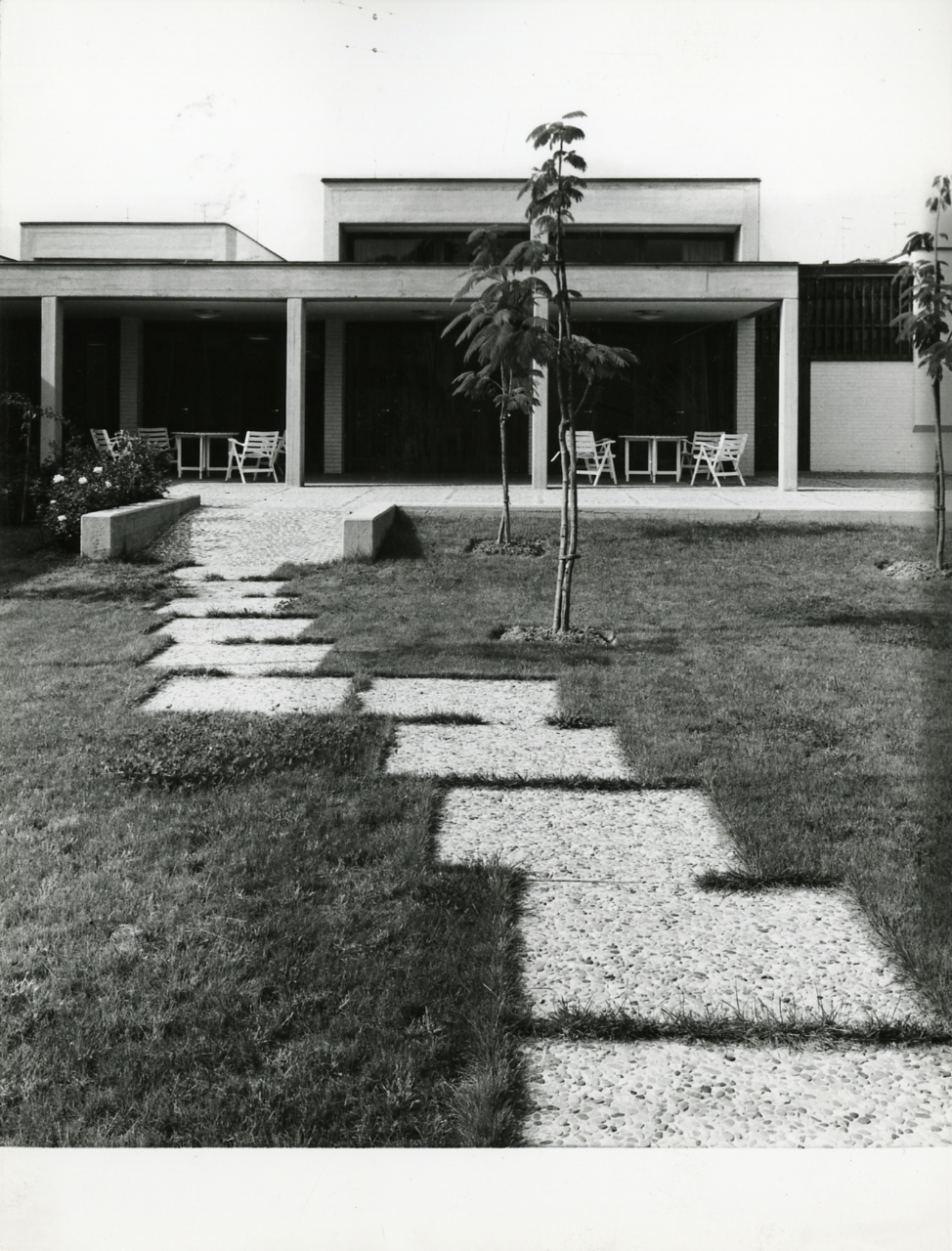
Neuropsychiatric Diagnostic Center in Imola, photographed by Paolo Monti

== Works (selection) ==
- Johns Hopkins University, Bologna (1956–1960)
- Walter Bigiavi Library, Bologna (1963–1973)
- Industrial Association, Bologna (1964)
- Neuropsychiatric Diagnostic Center, Imola (1964–1969)
- Church of Santa Croce, Casalecchio
- Royal Hotel Carlton, Bologna (1968–1973)
- Headquarters of Il Resto del Carlino, Bologna (1969)
- Malpighi Hospital, with G. Conato, Bologna (1972)
- State Telephone Central, now the Department of Business Sciences, Bologna (1974)
- University of Calabria Building, Cosenza
- National Research Council (CNR), Bologna
- Dario Nobili Library of the Territorial Research Area (ATR) of CNR in Bologna, Bologna (1995)
- Stadio Renato Dall'Ara, renovation and expansion for the World Cup, Bologna (1990)
- Turin Courthouse (1990–2000)

== Sources ==
- Koenig, Giovanni Klaus (1980). Enzo Zacchiroli: il mestiere full-time. Bari: Dedalo. ISBN 978-88-220-3342-0.
- Sergio Signorini; Enzo Zacchiroli; Patrizia Virginia Belli; Francesco Gurrieri, eds. (2000). Enzo Zacchiroli. Forma e spazio. Milan: Electa.
- Zacchiroli, Enzo; Pisani, Mario (2000). "New Law Courts: Nuova sede del Palazzo di Giustizia di Torino". Learning from Modernity. La lezione della modernità. Milan: L'Arcaedizioni.
