= Reggio Emilia Courthouse =

Judiciary building in Reggio Emilia, Italy

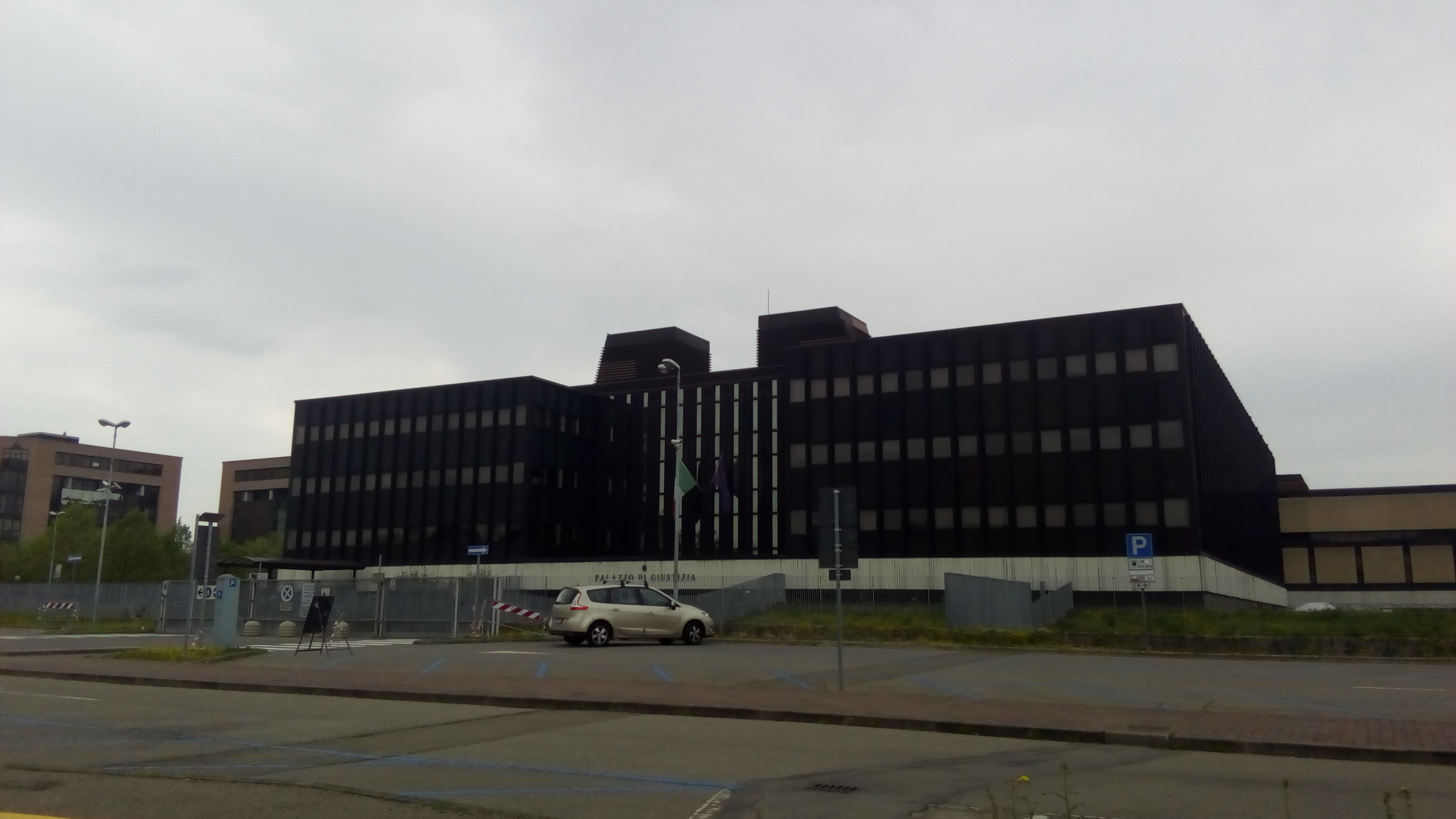
- Interactive map of the Reggio Emilia Courthouse area

General information
- Location: Reggio Emilia, Emilia-Romagna, Italy
- Coordinates: 44°42′32.5″N 10°38′06.1″E
- Construction started: 1984
- Completed: 1992

Design and construction
- Architects: Pierluigi Spadolini, Guido Lorenzo Spadolini

The Reggio Emilia Courthouse (Italian: Palazzo di Giustizia di Reggio Emilia, lit. 'Palace of Justice of Reggio Emilia') is a judicial complex located on Via Avvenire Paterlini in Reggio Emilia, Italy.

== Description ==
The courthouse is located on Via Avvenire Paterlini, next to the Milan–Bologna railway. This site represents the connecting loop between the historic city center and the integrated system of tertiary structures situated in the northern districts. The project was entrusted to architect Pierluigi Spadolini, assisted by his son Guido. The work began in 1984 and was completed in 1992, the year the building was inaugurated.

The building features structures with a reinforced concrete frame, a flat roof, and is characterized by exposed reinforced concrete on the lower part of the facades, with metallic paneling on the upper section. The windows are made of aluminum.

According to Zanichelli (1991), the building is "an example of advanced industrial technology", since "it features the facades of the main body entirely clad in copper sheet metal, while the masonry of the concrete prefabricated panels of the secondary structure reflects technological solutions typical of the architect's linguistic vocabulary".

== Sources ==
- Maristella Casciato; Piero Orlandi, eds. (2005). Quale e Quanta. Architettura in Emilia Romagna nel secondo Novecento. Bologna: Clueb.
- Zanichelli, Sergio (1991). Itinerari reggiani di architettura moderna. A guide to modern architecture in Reggio Emilia and province. Florence: Alinea. p. 186.
