= Marco Zanuso =

Italian architect (1916–2001)

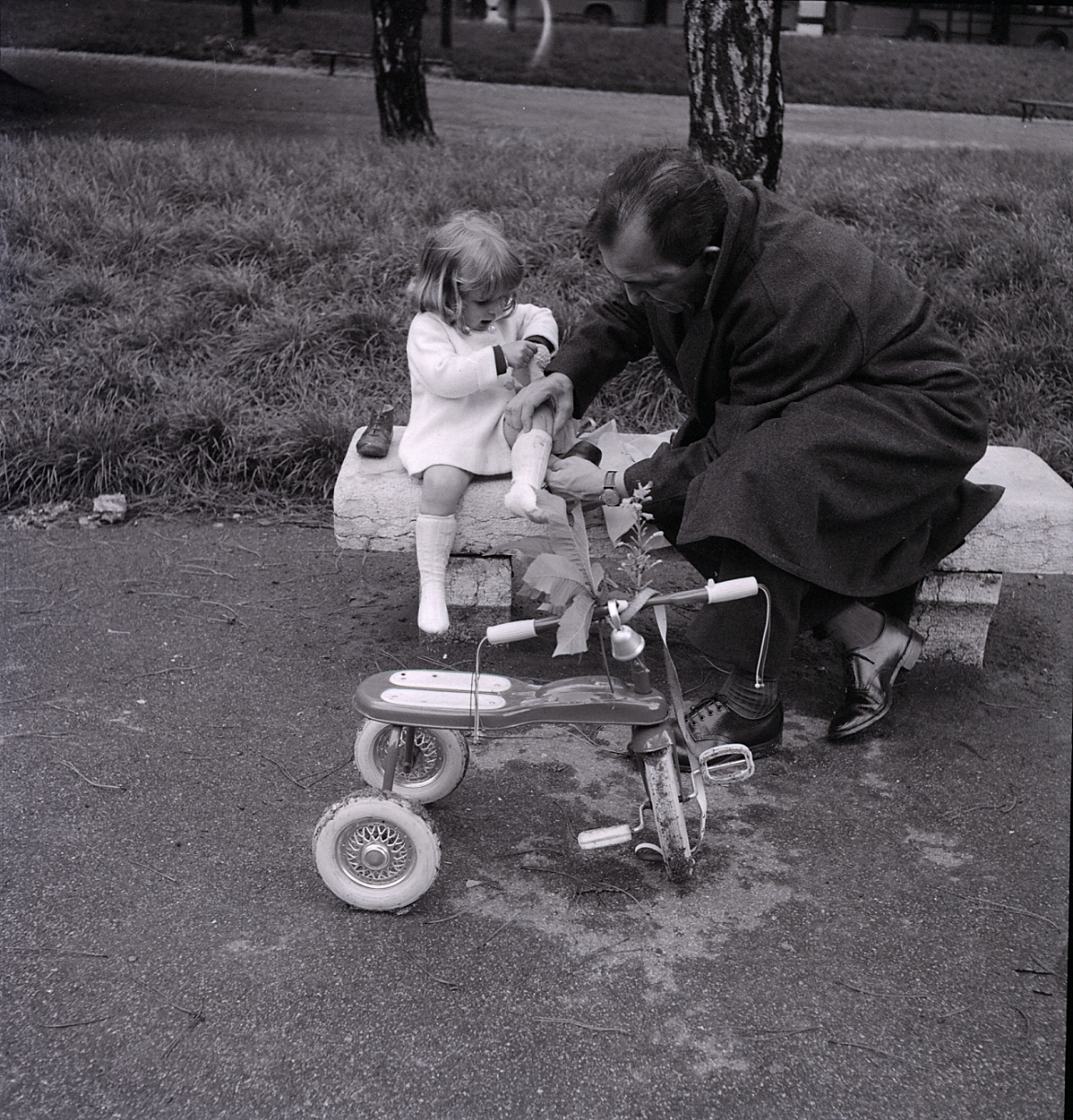
- Zanuso in 1960 (Paolo Monti photograph)
- Born: 14 May 1916; Milan
- Died: 11 July 2001 (aged 85); Milan
- Occupation: Architect, designer
- Awards: Compasso d'Oro (1956, 1962)

Marco Zanuso (14 May 1916 – 11 July 2001) was an Italian architect and designer associated with modernism.

== Early life ==
Marco Zanuso was born in Milan, Italy, on 14 May 1916. He was part of a group of Milanese designers who helped shape the international concept of "good design" in the postwar years. He began studying architecture at the Politecnico di Milano in 1934 and graduated in 1939. During the Second World War, he served in the Italian Navy. After the war, in 1945, he established his own design office.

From the beginning of his career, Zanuso was active in architectural and design discourse. He served as editor of Domus from 1947 to 1949, and of Casabella from 1952 to 1956. In collaboration with Ernesto Nathan Rogers and others, he contributed to developing the theories and ideals of the modern design movement. As a professor of architecture, design, and urban planning at the Politecnico di Milano from the late 1940s until the 1980s, and as a founding member of the Associazione per il Disegno Industriale (ADI) in the 1950s, he influenced a new generation of Italian designers.

== Career ==
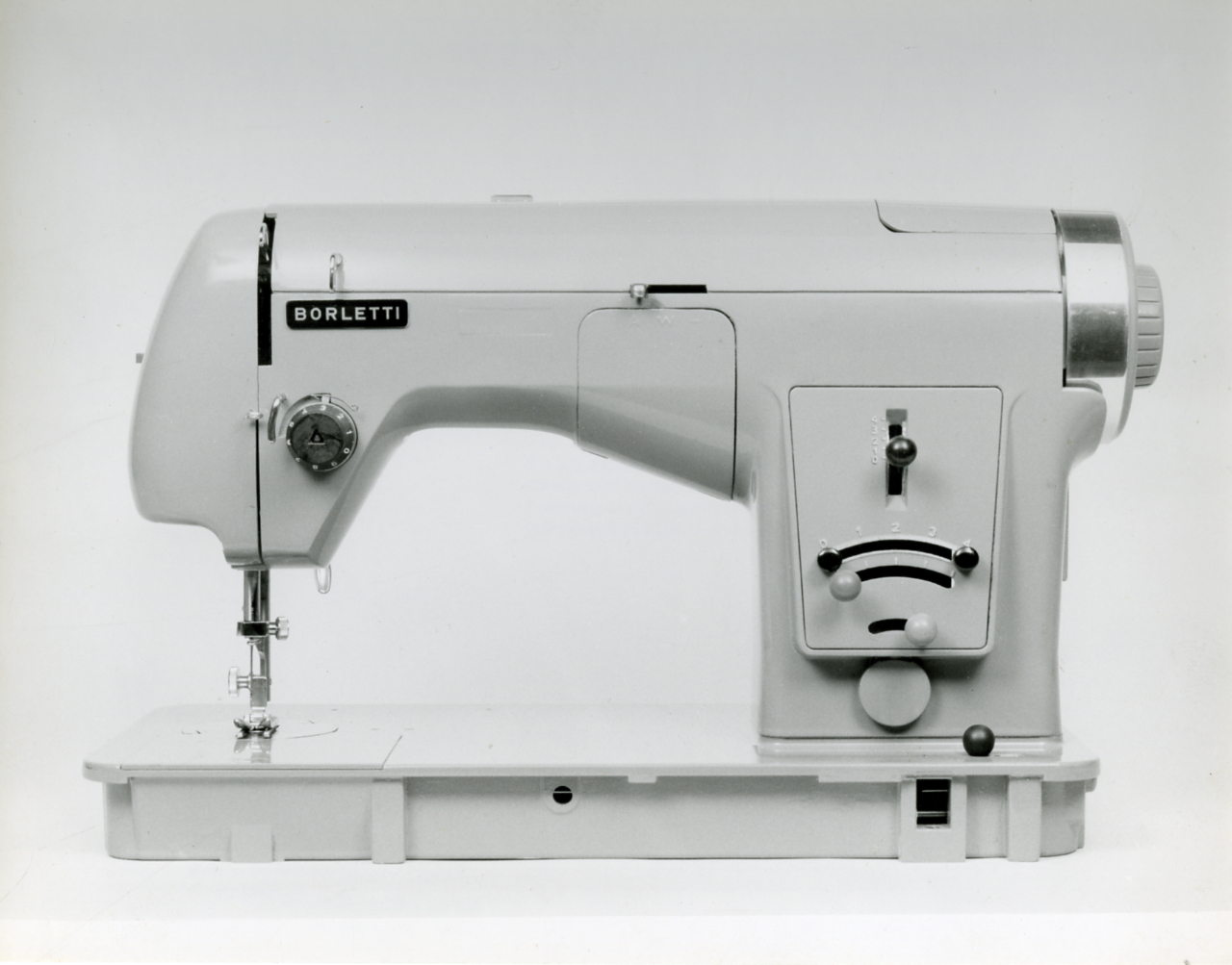
Sewing machine mod. 1102 (Fratelli Borletti), winner of the Compasso d'Oro. Photo by Paolo Monti, 1956.

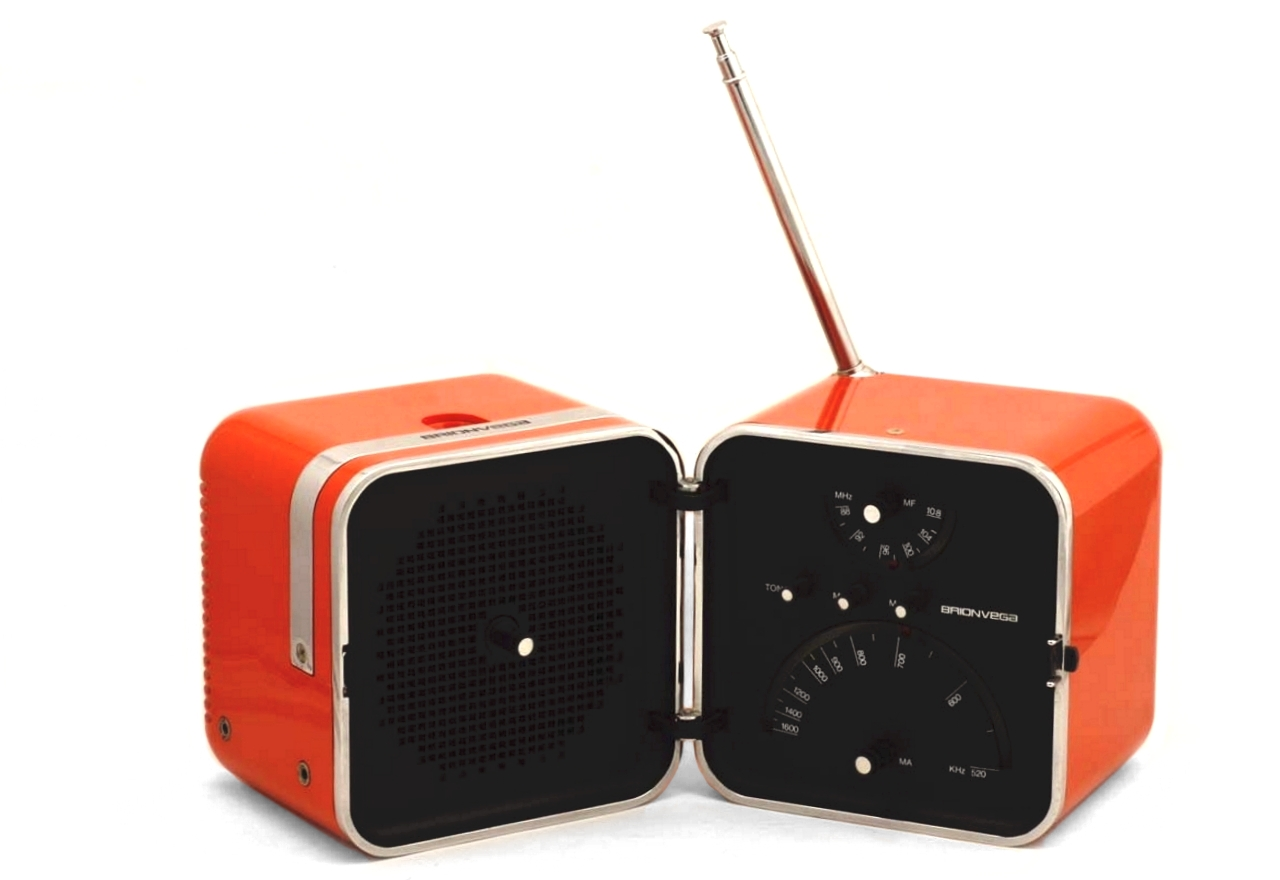
TS 502 radio designed for Brionvega (Museum of Science and Technology, Milan)

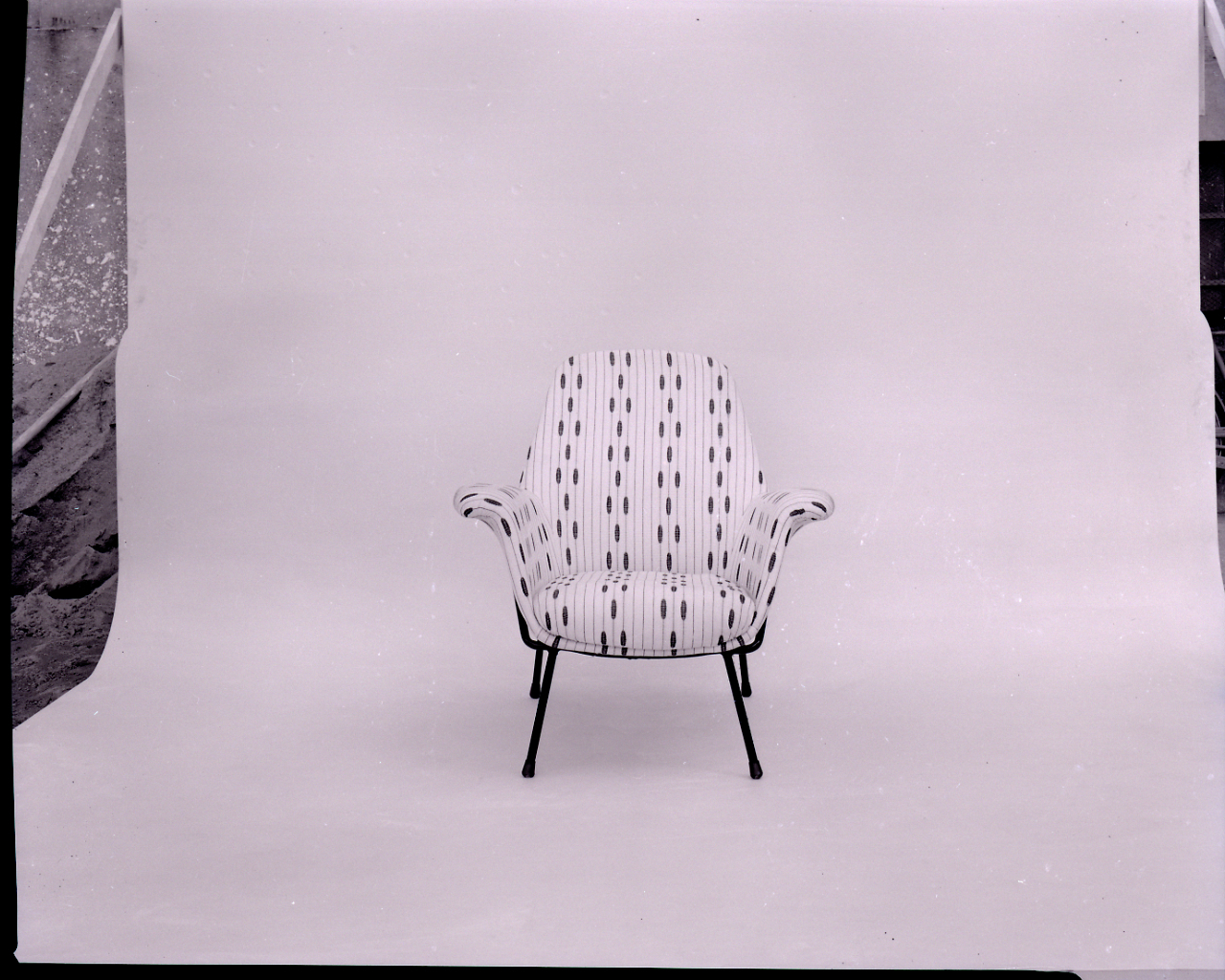
Armchair Martingala (Arflex). Photo by Paolo Monti, 1975.

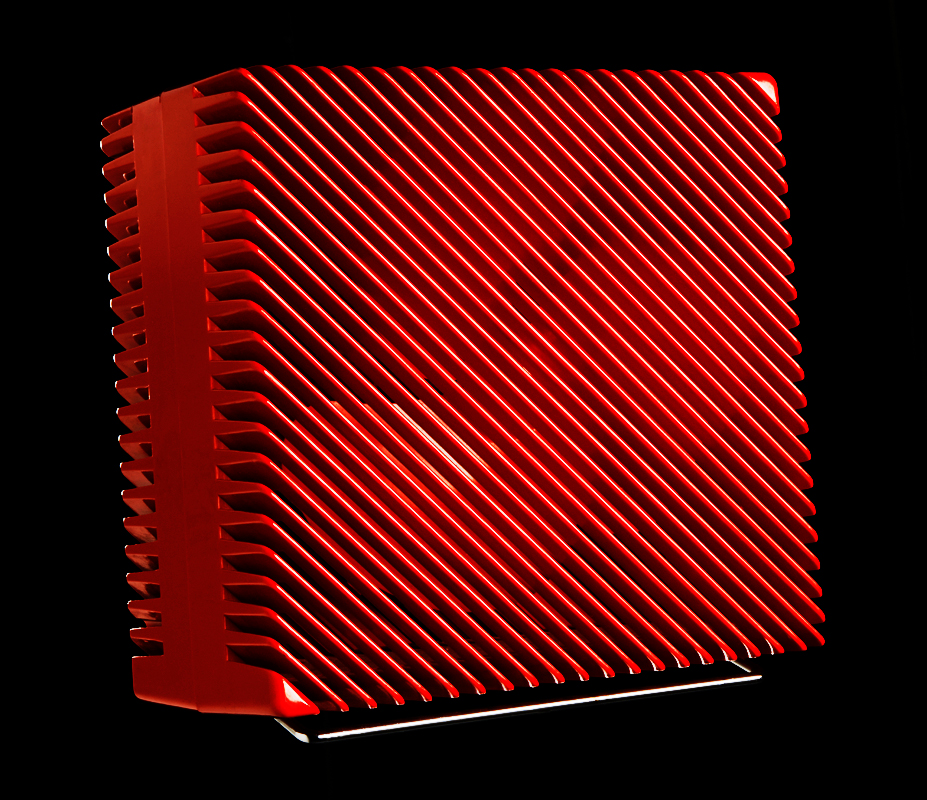
Ariante fan for Vortice, designed by Zanuso

Zanuso's career spanned more than six decades. His focus on rational design as a means of problem-solving allowed him to explore new approaches in urban planning, architecture, and product design. He described his "inquisitiveness" as a driving force behind a "constant search for a new discovery". His method of "finding order in complexity" fostered openness to technological innovation, new materials, and functional aesthetics that aimed to enhance human experience.

Throughout his career, Zanuso collaborated with historians such as Giulio Carlo Argan, Domenico Pica, and Luigi Veronesi, with critics including Bruno Zevi and Gillo Dorfles, and with architects such as Ernesto Nathan Rogers and Gio Ponti. His association with Rogers was particularly significant, leading to his editorial roles at Domus and Casabella and to early essays in which his approach to modernism was articulated.

In 1957, Zanuso began a long-term partnership with German designer Richard Sapper. One of their first projects was a small, stackable plastic chair for children, designed for Kartell. The chair was light, functional, and playful, produced in several bright colours, and contributed to the acceptance of plastic as a material suitable for modern domestic furniture.

Zanuso and Sapper were appointed consultants to Brionvega in 1959. The company aimed to create stylish electronics to rival those produced in Japan and Germany. Together they designed radios and televisions that became emblematic of "techno-functionalism". Their "Doney 14" (Compasso d'Oro, 1962), the first completely transistor television, and the compact folding "Grillo" telephone for Siemens (1966), were among their most influential works. The Grillo was one of the first telephones to integrate the dial and earpiece into a single unit.

In 1971, Zanuso was invited to deliver a lecture in the Dunhill industrial design series in Australia. The following year, he and Sapper created modular dwellings for the exhibition Italy: The New Domestic Landscape at the MoMA in New York. Each unit could be unfolded into a living space complete with facilities and accessories of a small apartment. Zanuso described the project as "designed for all situations that require immediately available, easily transportable living quarters".

Zanuso received several honours during his career. He was awarded the Premio Presidente della Repubblica in 1984, the Compasso d'Oro Lifetime Achievement Award in 1994, and an honorary degree in industrial design from the Politecnico di Milano in 1999, where he also lectured from the 1960s to the 1980s.

== Architecture ==
Alongside his work with Richard Sapper in industrial design, Zanuso developed an architectural practice from his Milan studio, undertaking projects in Italy as well as in Argentina, Brazil, and South Africa. He designed commercial warehouses, offices, public buildings, and private residences, seeking to integrate modernist principles with functional and social considerations.

Notable examples of his commercial architecture include the Olivetti factory (1961) in São Paulo and the new Piccolo Teatro (1996) in Milan. His residential projects are regarded as contributing to architectural innovation in a period that redefined the role and processes of the modern movement. Among these are the Casa a Leto di Priolo in Arenzano (1960–1962), Case di vacanza in Arzachena (1962–1964), Casa Press at Coromandel Farm near Lydenburg, South Africa (1969–1975), and the Casa nell'isola di Cavallo in Corsica (1981–1988).

Zanuso's interest in architecture that responded to natural settings is reflected in projects such as the Cimitero alla Muda in Longarone (1967–1973), a collaboration with Gianni Avon, Francesco Tentori, and landscape architect Pietro Porcinai.

== Industrial design ==
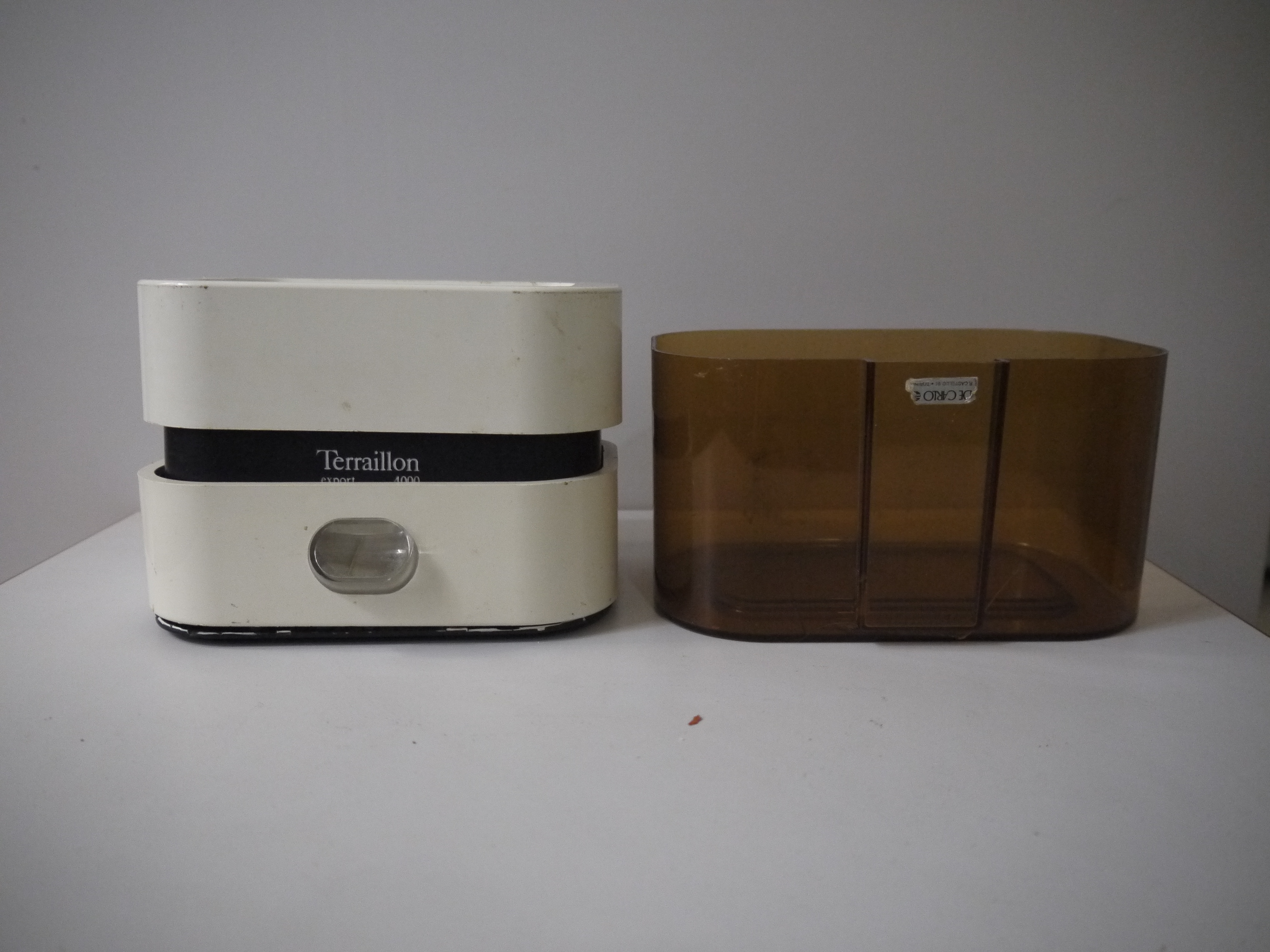
Terraillon Export 4000 scale, designed with Richard Sapper (1970s)

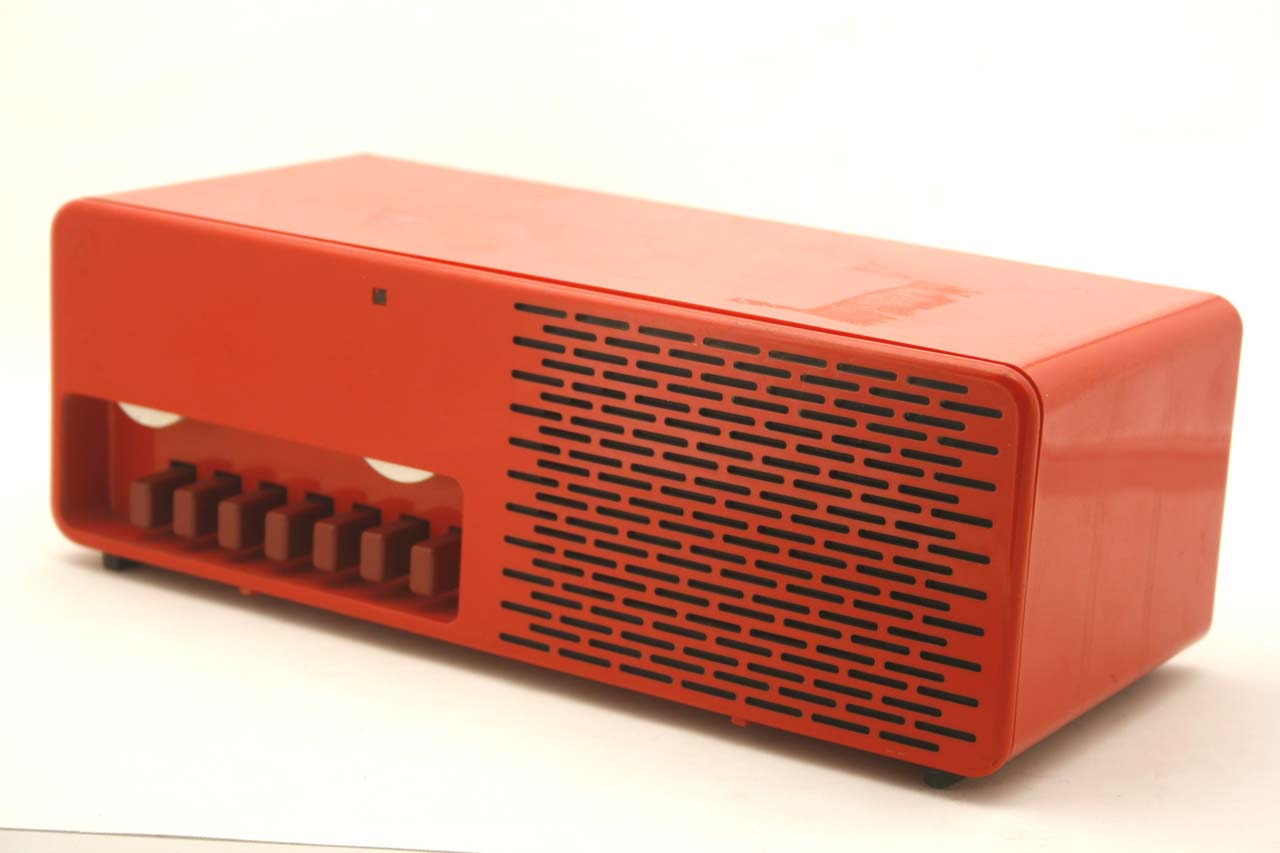
Analogue piped radio receiver for SIT Siemens, designed with Richard Sapper (1960s)

Zanuso's work in industrial design ranged from early experiments in bent metal to upholstered furniture and plastic consumer goods. A consistent theme in his career was the exploration of new materials and techniques, with the aim of improving accessibility and functionality.

His first works to gain international attention were exhibited at the Low-Cost Furniture competition organised by the Museum of Modern Art (MoMA) in 1948, where he presented a metal-framed chair using an innovative method to attach the fabric seat to the structure. In the same year, Pirelli established a new division, Arflex, to produce seating with foam rubber upholstery and commissioned Zanuso to design their first models. The Antropus chair was released in 1949, followed by the Lady chair, which won first prize at the 1951 Milan Triennale. Zanuso praised the new material for its capacity to revolutionise upholstery and manufacturing, noting its potential to achieve new structural and formal possibilities with industrial standards previously unattainable.

His work is represented in the collections of the Museum of Modern Art in New York City, the Triennale Milano, Triennale Tokyo, the Vitra Design Museum, the Arflex Museum, and the Kartell Museum.

=== Significant designs ===
- 1951 – Lady armchair for Arflex (Medaglia d'Oro Triennale)
- 1952 – Martingala armchair for Arflex
- 1952 – Tripoltrona sofa for Arflex (Medaglia d'Oro Triennale)
- 1954 – Sleep-o-matic sofa for Arflex (Medaglia d'Oro Triennale)
- 1955 – Olivetti buildings in Buenos Aires and São Paulo
- 1956 – Model 1102 sewing machine for Fratelli Borletti
- 1960 – Lambda chair for Gavina (with Richard Sapper)
- 1962 – Doney television for Brionvega (with Richard Sapper)
- 1963 – Alfa Romeo 2600 design study (with Richard Sapper)
- 1964 – Algol television for Brionvega (with Richard Sapper)
- 1964 – Woodline and Fourline armchairs for Arflex
- 1964 – K 4999 children's chair for Kartell (with Richard Sapper)
- 1964 – TS 502 radio for Brionvega (with Richard Sapper)
- 1966 – Grillo telephone for Siemens (with Richard Sapper)
- 1969 – Black 201 television for Brionvega (with Richard Sapper)
- 1970 – BA 2000 kitchen scale for Terraillon
- 1970 – Marcuso table for Zanotta
- 1970 – Hastil pen for Aurora (with Richard Sapper)
- 1974 – IBM building in Milan
- 1995 – Duna cutlery set for Alessi
- 1998 – Piccolo Teatro, Milan
Works by Zanuso, photos by Paolo Monti

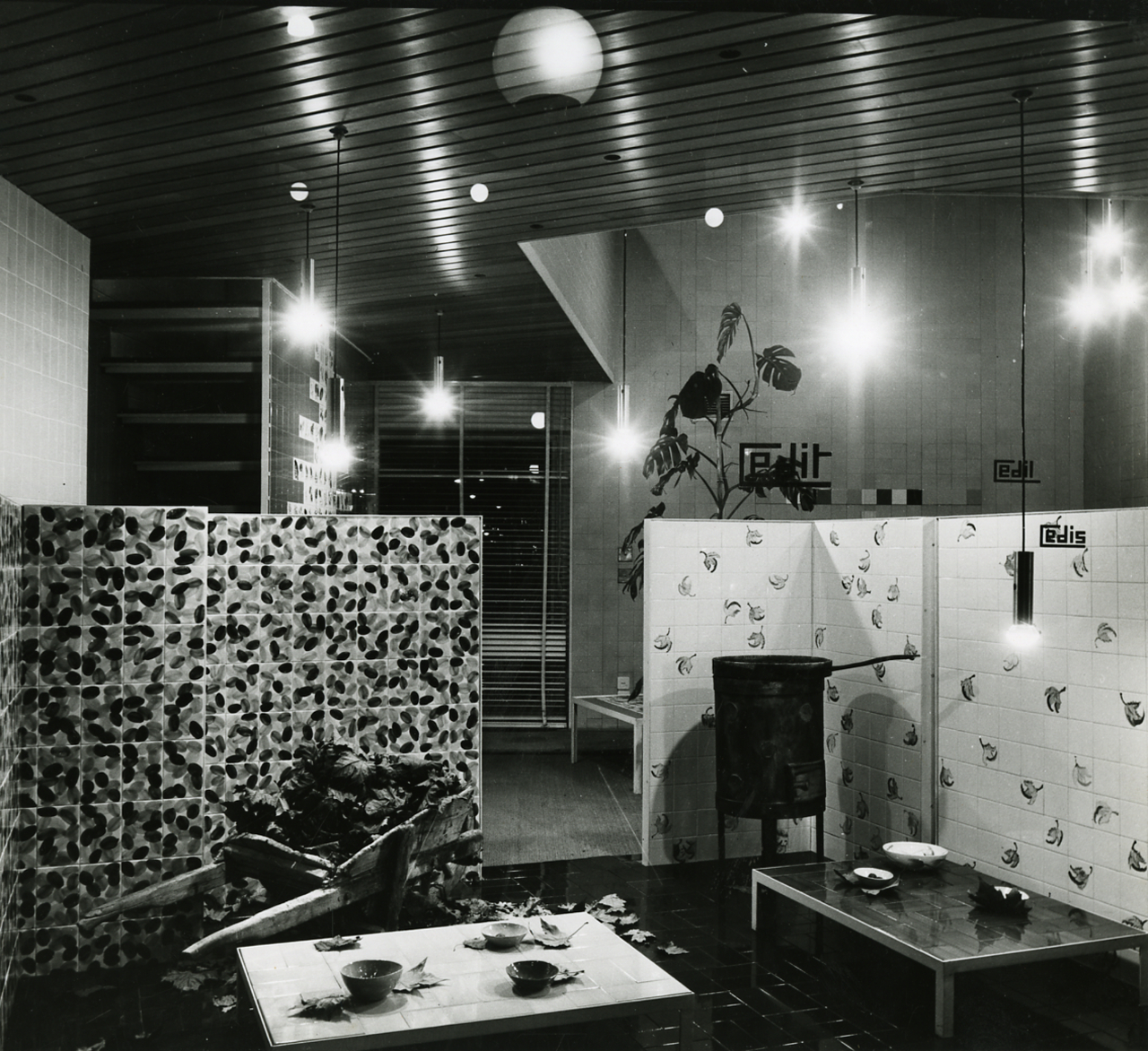
Credit shop, Milan, 1957

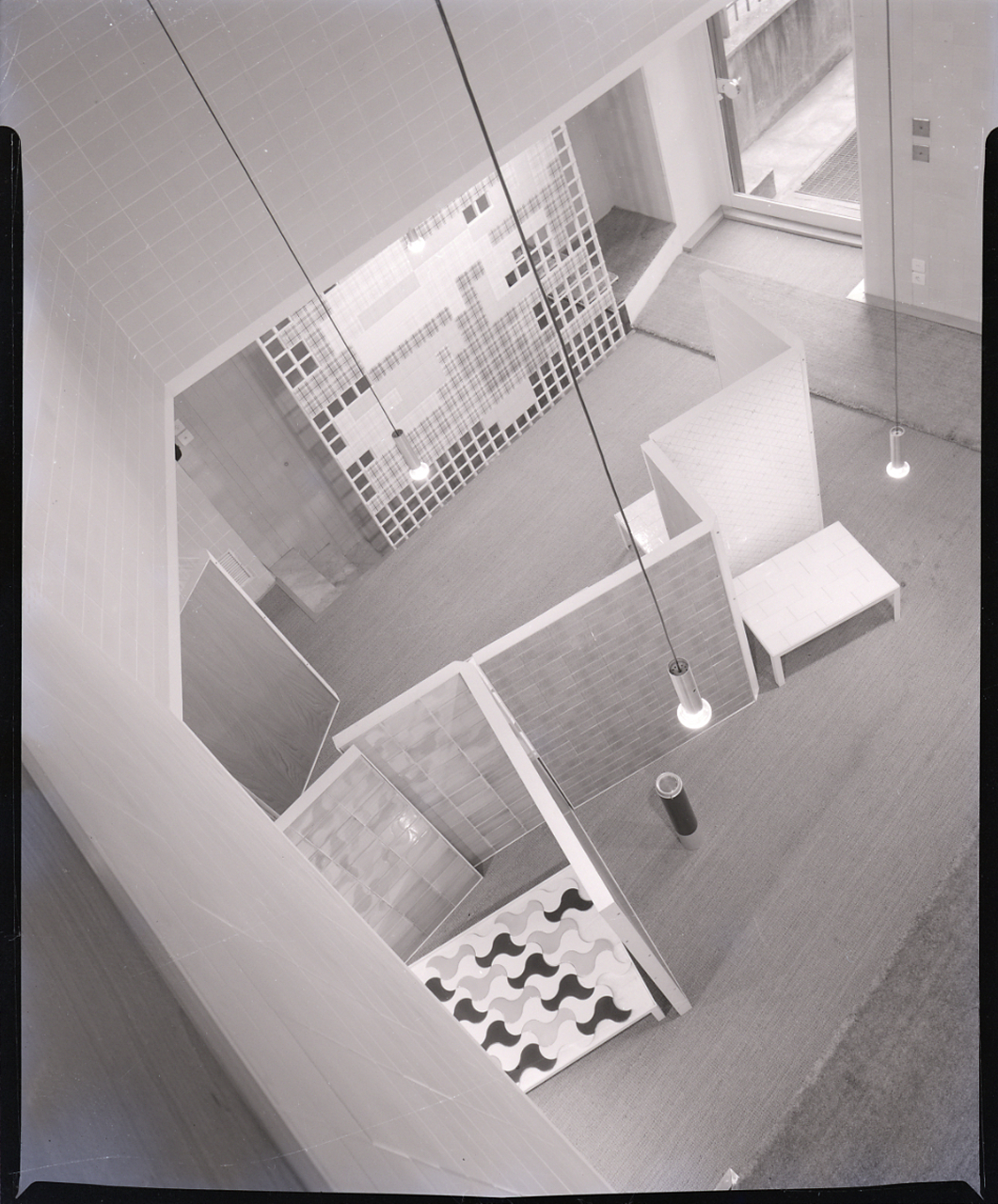
Shop installation, 1957

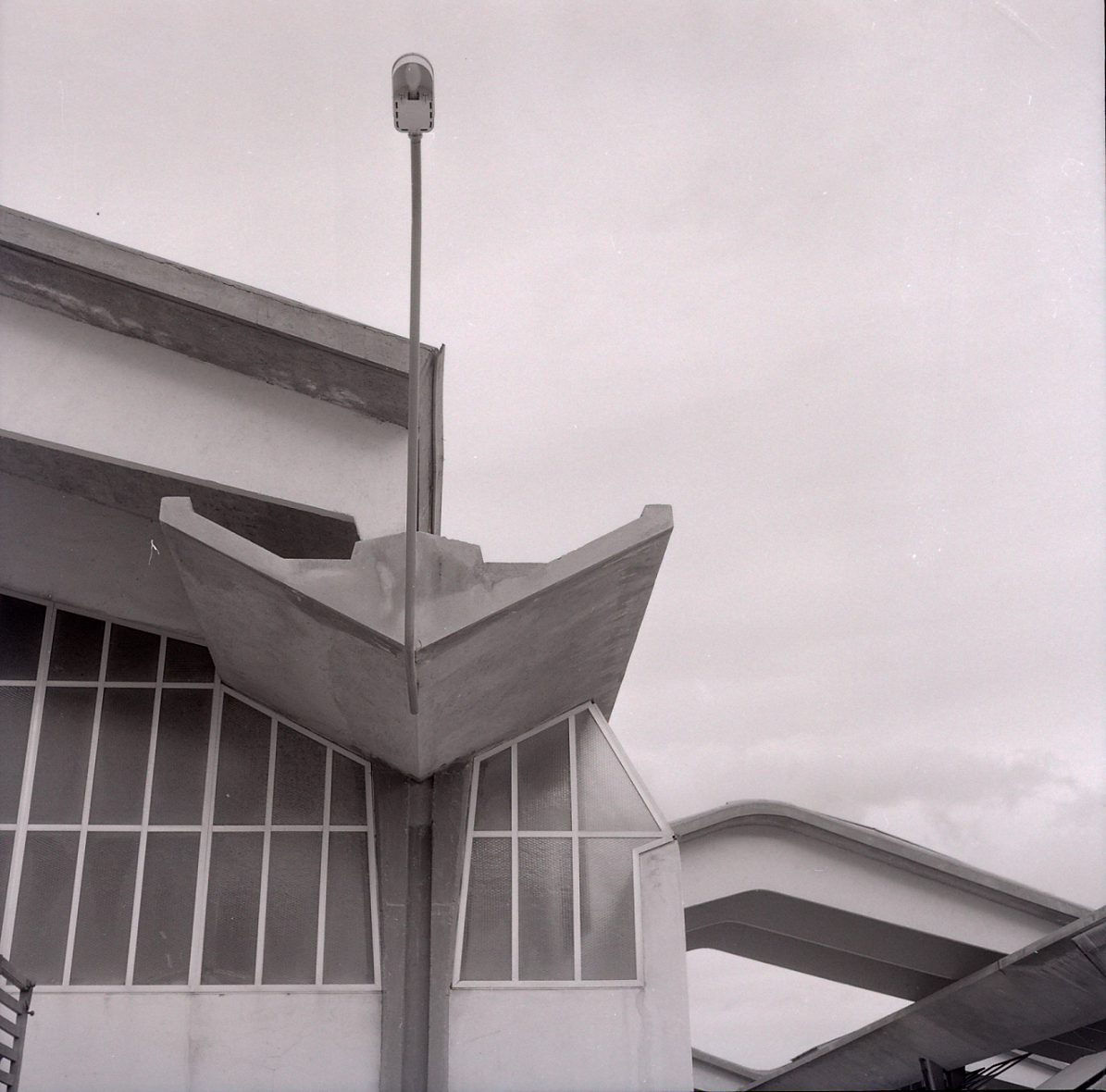
CEDIS ceramics industry, Palermo

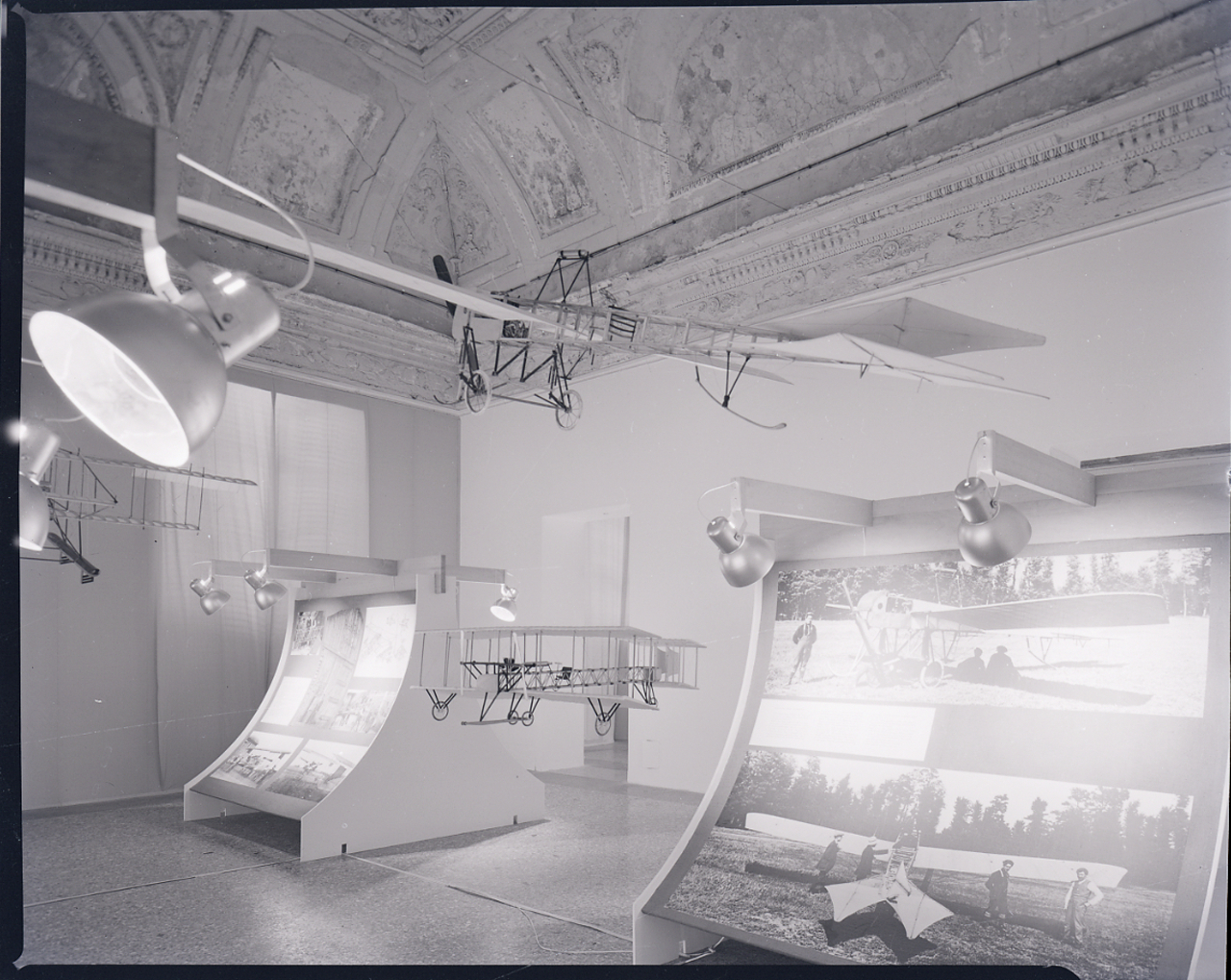
Exhibition on aviation pioneers, Royal Palace of Milan, 1960

== Publications ==
- François Burkhardt, Marco Zanuso. Design. Milan: Federico Motta Editore, 1994. ISBN 88-7179-082-0
- Aldo Colonnetti, Grafica e Design a Milano 1933–2000. Milan: Collana AIM – Abitare Segesta Cataloghi, 2001.
- L. Crespi et al., Marco Zanuso: architettura e design. Rome: Officina Libraria, 2020.
- M. De Giorgi, "Casa Press/Press House Marco Zanuso". Inventario, vol. 1, 2011, pp. 156–159.
- M. De Giorgi, Marco Zanuso architetto. Milan: Skira, 1999.
- E. Peres and A. Zamboni, Creating Coromandel: Marco Zanuso in South Africa. London: Artifice Press, 2022.
- R. Grignolo, Marco Zanuso: Scritti sulle tecniche di produzione e di progetto. Milan: Mendrisio Academy Press and Silvana Editoriale (Collection directed by Letizia Tedeschi), 2013.
