= Turin Courthouse =

Judiciary building in Turin, Italy

- Interactive map of the Turin Courthouse area

General information
- Location: Turin, Piedmont, Italy
- Coordinates: 45°04′15.06″N 7°39′27.9″E
- Construction started: 1990
- Completed: 2000
- Opening: 26 June 2001; 25 years ago

Design and construction
- Architects: Ezio Ingaramo, Enzo Zacchiroli

The Turin Courthouse (Italian: Palazzo di Giustizia di Torino, lit. 'Palace of Justice of Turin') is a judicial complex located on Corso Vittorio Emanuele II in Turin, Italy.

== History ==
On 13 March 1985, the Turin City Council approved a project to consolidate over twenty scattered judicial offices into a single building, with the executive plan approved in 1988. Architects Ezio Ingaramo and Enzo Zacchiroli designed the building, with consulting from Pierluigi Spadolini. Construction was carried out by Salini Impregilo, Recchi, Rizzani de Eccher, and Orion.

The courthouse was built on the site of the former livestock market at Corso Inghilterra and the "Pugnani and Sani" barracks. Construction began on 8 June 1990, and was later modified to add an extra floor, increasing costs by approximately 45 billion lire, financed through legislation promoted by Minister of Justice Piero Fassino. The complex, costing around 350 billion lire—with 7 billion contributed by the Municipality—suffered from design flaws and was completed in 2001, nearly seven years behind schedule. It was inaugurated on 26 June 2001 and dedicated to the memory of magistrate Bruno Caccia, murdered by 'Ndrangheta in 1983.

== Description ==
The building reflects the urban fabric of the historic city, featuring exposed Piedmontese bricks reminiscent of Turin's traditional finishes. Large windows—covering 30,000 m²—maximize natural light throughout the structure.

The project comprises two interconnected buildings joined by a metal framework, with a total area of approximately 60,000 m². It spans seven above-ground floors and three underground levels, housing 90 rooms—located on the ground and basement floors, including a high-security bunker—a workforce of 1,700 offices, an 800-seat auditorium that can be fully separated for public events, and a dedicated floor for legal professionals.

== Sources ==
- Zacchiroli, Enzo; Pisani, Mario (2000). "New Law Courts: Nuova sede del Palazzo di Giustizia di Torino". Learning from Modernity. La lezione della modernità. Milan: L'Arcaedizioni. p. 29.
- Sergio Signorini; Enzo Zacchiroli; Patrizia Virginia Belli; Francesco Gurrieri, eds. (2000). Enzo Zacchiroli. Forma e spazio. Milan: Electa. p. 75.
