= List of museums in Milan =

Below is a list of museums in Milan. The city of Milan is an important cultural, artistic, design and fashion center in the north of Italy and it has an excellent museum complex both civic (under the municipality of Milan) and private.

== List of museums ==
Name	Image	Municipio	Type	Summary
Acquario Civico di Milano		1	Biology	Founded in 1906, is one of the oldest aquariums in the world. it is housed in a Viennese Art Nouveau building in the Parco Sempione area.
ADI Design Museum		8	Design	Displays the historic collection of the Compasso d'Oro design award.
Armani/Silos		6	Fashion	Hosted in a renovated grain storage warehouse, it is home to a selection of dresses that showcases the professional experience of Giorgio Armani. It also hosts temporary exhibitions.
Casa Museo Boschi Di Stefano		1	Historic house	Selection of 300 paintings, mainly from the 20th century, displayed in eleven rooms in a 1930s building designed by the architect Piero Portaluppi.
Casa Manzoni		1	Biographical	House that Alessandro Manzoni purchased in 1813 and lived for some sixty years until his death.
Castello Sforzesco		1	Multiple	Wide museum complex of various civic collections and cultural institutions of the city: Archivio Storico Civico e Biblioteca Trivulziana; Museo d'Arte Antica; Museo dei Mobili e delle Sculture Lignee; Museo delle Arti Decorative; Museo degli Strumenti Musicali; Pinacoteca del Castello Sforzesco; Museo Archeologico - Sezione Preistoria e Protostoria; Museo Archeologico - Sezione Egizia; Museo della Pietà Rondanini; Gabinetto Numismatico e Medagliere; Raccolta delle Stampe "Achille Bertarelli"
Centrale dell’Acqua di Milano (CAMi)		8	Industry	Part of the Milan Aqueduct, focuses on environmental education.
Cimitero Monumentale		8	Historic site	Inaugurated in 1866, it is the resting place of illustrious Milanese citizens: Alessandro Manzoni, Luca Beltrami or Dario Fo. It is characterised by an extraordinary collection of styles and artistic languages varying from Romanticism to contemporary abstractionism.
Civico Planetario "Ulrico Hoepli"		1	Science	Inaugurated in 1930 and continues to be Italy's largest planetarium as well as one of the most prominent in Europe and the rest of the world.
Civico Museo Archeologico di Milano		1	Archaeology	Civic collection of Ancient Greece, Romans, Etruscans and Early Middle Ages archeologic reperts.
Fondazione Prada		5	Contemporary art	Opened in 2015, organized exhibitions of Italian and international artists with a permanent contemporary art collection.
Fondazione Luigi Rovati		1	Art	Private collection of Ethruscan Art and contemporary art.
Galleria d'Arte Moderna (GAM)		1	Art	Housed in the Villa Belgiojoso Bonaparte, hosts a collection largely of Italian and European works from the 18th to the 20th centuries.
Gallerie d'Italia - Piazza Scala		1	Art	Hosts a paintings and sculpture collection of 19th and 20th century belonging to Intesa Sanpaolo international banking group. Alongside hosts temporary exhibitions.
GASC - Galleria d’Arte Sacra dei Contemporanei		9	Religious art	20th century religious artworks collection housed in the historic palace Villa Clerici.
I Tesori della Ca' Granda		1	Art	Portrait gallery of Policlinico of Milan's benefactors from the 17th century with a display of surgical tools.
La Vigna di Leonardo		1	History	Museum which shows the historic Leonardo da Vinci vineyard housed in the garden of the 15th century historic house "Casa degli Atellani".
La Triennale di Milano		1	Multiple	International cultural institution established in 1923, host exhibitions meetings and conferences. It showcases a permantent collection of Italian design and hosts the Triennale Teatro dell' Arte.
Leonardo3 Museum		1	Technology	Leonardo da Vinci's 3D machines, physical reconstructions and restorations of artwork in virtual reality. Housed in the Vittorio Emanuele II Gallery.
MAPP - Museo d'Arte Paolo Pini		1	Contemporary art	Hosts a collection of over 140 pieces of artwork by contemporary artists to promote art as a therapeutic tool.
Memoriale della Shoah di Milano		2	Memorial	Shoah memorial built on the site where Jews and political opponents were deported during the German occupation of Italy.
MIC - Museo Interattivo del Cinema		1	Media	Founded in 1990, houses a collection of film memorabilia.
MUSA - Museo Universitario delle Scienze Antropologiche, mediche e forensi per i Diritti Umani		1	Science	University of Milan museum, with the aim to spread the role of medical, anthropological and forensic sciences in the fight against violence and in the protection of human rights.
Museo Astronomico di Brera		1	Science	Houses scientific instruments that were used by astronomers from 1760 to the middle of the 20th century, including the Merz telescope that was used by Giovanni Schiaparelli for his early observations of Mars.
Museo Bagatti Valsecchi		1	Historic house	One of the well-preserved house museums in the world. Hosts a collection of 15th and 16th century paintings and artefacts.
Museo Civico di Storia Naturale di Milano		1	Natural history	Oldest natural history museum in Italy, features a variety of galleries about mineralogy, paleontology, entomology and zoology.
Museo Collezione Branca		9	Industry	Historic collection housed in the old factory of the 1845 founded Fratelli Branca distillery.
Museo d'Arte e Scienza		1	Ethnic	Collection of Buddhist and African art. The museal institution uses a unique scientific method to determine if a piece of ancient artwork is real or fake.
Museo dei Cappuccini		3	Religious art	Museum run by Order of Friars Minor Capuchin mainly houses religious art from 15th to 20th century.
Museo del Cenacolo Vinciano		1	Art	Museum of UNESCO World Heritage Site Leonardo's Last Supper, housed in the refectory of the convent of Santa Maria delle Grazie.
Museo del Duomo di Milano		1	Art	Museum of the Milan Duomo.
Museo del Novecento		1	Contemporary art	Displays works mostly of 20th century Italian Avant-garde.
Museo Della Basilica di Sant'Ambrogio		1	Religious art	Exhibition of artworks and liturgical furnishing dating from the 14th to the 20th century, coming from the Basilica of Sant'Ambrogio.
Museo della Macchina da scrivere		9	Technology	Collection of 2000 different models of typewriters and mechanical calculators that have been produced all over the world from 1880.
Museo della Permanente		1	Art	Art collection owned by the "Società per le Belle Arti ed Esposizione Permanente", a nonprofit organisation, of 400 artworks by artists from 20th century.
Museo delle Culture (MUDEC)		6	Ethnic	Multifunctional venue dedicated to the cultures of the world. Hosts a permanent collection of works from Asia, Africa and America.
Museo di Sant'Eustorgio		1	Art	Includes the early Christian burial ground ruins, the Chapter house, the monumental sacristy of the ancient Dominican monastery, and the Portinari Chapel of the Basilica of Sant'Eustorgio.
Museo Diocesano di Milano		1	Art	Houses a permanent collection of sacred artworks, especially from Milan and Lombardy area.
Museo Magnini Bonomi		1	Historic house	Collection of everyday objects for work and for entertainment.
Museo Martinitt e Stelline		1	History	Milan's history in the 19th and 20th centuries through the lives of the orphans who lived in the Martinitt and Stelline orphanages.
Museo Mondo Milan		8	Sports	Collection of memorabilia about A.C. Milan housed in football club headquarters.
Museo Nazionale Scienza e Tecnologia Leonardo da Vinci		1	Technology	One of the biggest science museum in Europe. It is also home of the submarine Toti and Vega space vector.
Museo Poldi Pezzoli		1	Art	Displays a collection of paintings and decorative arts from archeological times to 19th century, belonged to Gian Giacomo Poldi Pezzoli.
Museo Popoli e Culture		7	Ethnic	Houses a collection of artwork and everyday objects from various continents.
Museo Teatrale alla Scala		1	Local	Founded in 1913, reopened in 2004 after restoration works. Showing a collection of artifacts, paintings and instruments related to the Teatro alla Scala opera house history.
Museo San Fedele		1	Art	Situated in the 16th century San Fedele church. Ancient and contemporary artworks are exposed.
Museo Storico dei Vigili del Fuoco		8	History	Museum about Vigili del Fuoco, Italian institutional agency for fire and rescue service, history.
PAC - Padiglione d'Arte Contemporanea		1	Contemporary art	Exhibition venue of Italian and international contemporary artists designed by architect Ignazio Gardella.
Palazzo Morando - Costume Moda Immagine		1	Art	Exposition of artworks and period exhibitions of costumes as testimony of Milan between the 1600s and the early 1900s on the first floor. The ground floor hosts temporary exhibitions, events and meetings.
Palazzo Moriggia - Museo del Risorgimento		1	History	The collection include works and antiques from the Napoleonic period to the annexation of Rome by the kingdom of Italy.
Palazzo Reale di Milano		1	Art	Milan's main exhibition venue from ancient to contemporary art shows.
Parco dell'Anfiteatro e Antiquarium Alda Levi		1	Archeology	Highlights the remains of the Milan amphitheatre, one of the biggest of the Roman Empire.
Pinacoteca di Brera		1	Art	Painting collection from 13th century to Romanticism.
Pirelli HangarBicocca		1	Contemporary art	Exhibition venue of contemporary art established in 2004 from an old Pirelli factory, host a permanent work by Anselm Kiefer.
San Siro Museum		7	Sports	About Inter Milan and A.C. Milan football clubs.
Studio Museo Francesco Messina		1	Historic house	Former Francesco Messina's studio, host around 80 of his sculptures.
Studio Museo Ernesto Treccani		1	Historic house	Records the artistic career of Ernesto Treccani, from the early "Corrente" period to Realism and present day developments.
Veneranda Biblioteca Ambrosiana		1	Art	Historic library founded in 1609 by Cardinal Federico Borromeo, also housing a painting collection most from the Renaissance, one of the main in the city.
Villa Necchi Campiglio		1	Historic house	Designed by architect Piero Portaluppi, hosts an art and furniture collection from 18th to 20th century.
WOW Spazio Fumetto		4	Media	Dedicated to comics and illustrations. Also hosts temporary exhibitions.
