= Armani/Silos =

Fashion Art museum in Milan

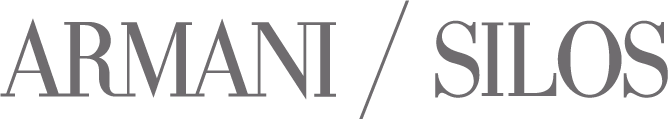
Armani/Silos
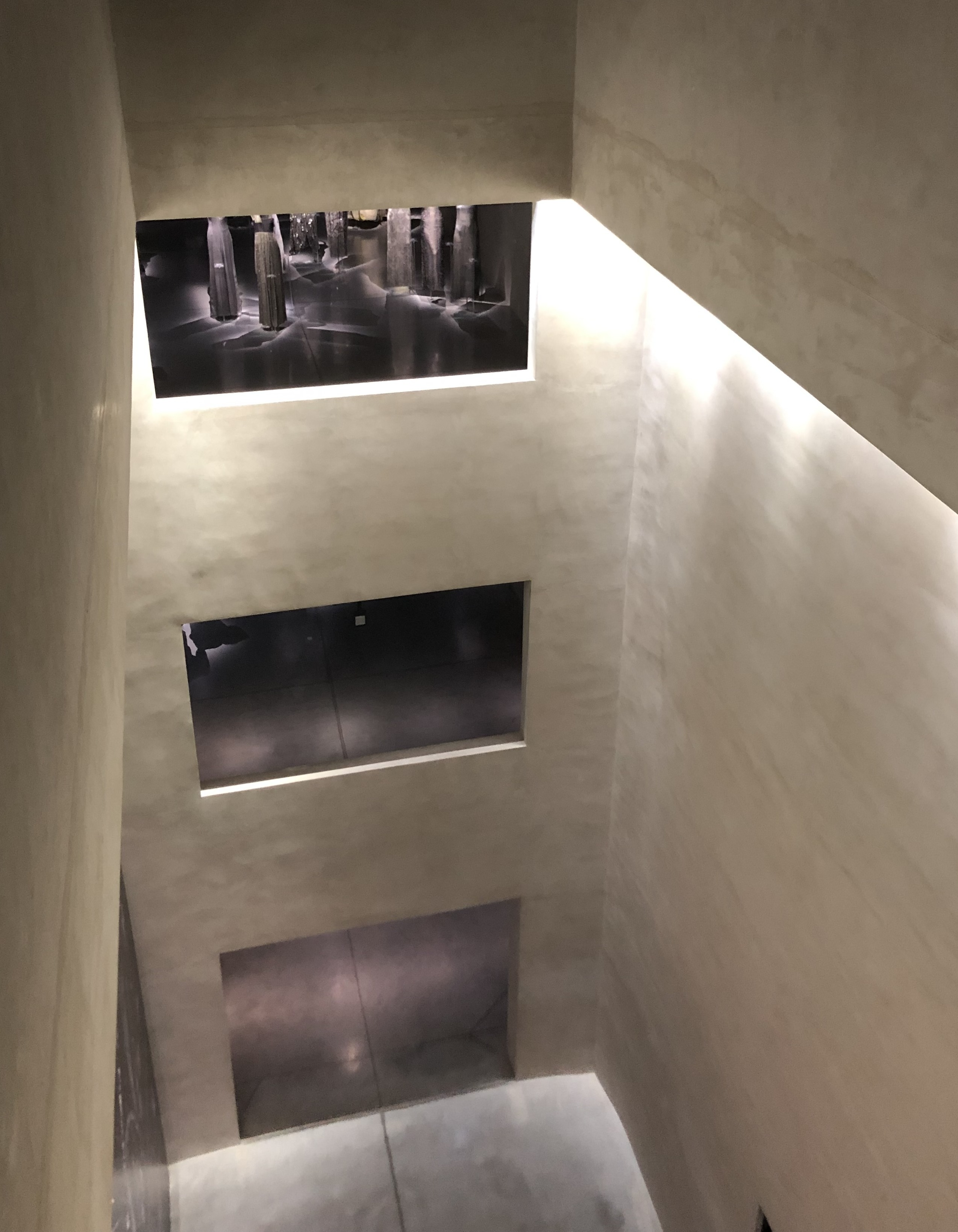
- Established: April 30, 2015; 11 years ago
- Location: via Bergognone, 40; Milan, Lombardy, Italy
- Public transit access: Milan Metro: MM2 - Porta Genova; Milan Tramways: Tram 14, Stop Piazza del Rosario
- Website: www.armanisilos.com

Armani/Silos is a fashion art museum in Milan, Italy dedicated to the Armani style founded by Giorgio Armani. The opening exhibition was divided into themes:

- Ground floor: "Heimat: A Sense of Belonging", the dedicated to Peter Lindbergh (until August 2021)
- First floor: Androgynous
- Second floor: Ethnicities
- Third floor: Stars / Digital Archive
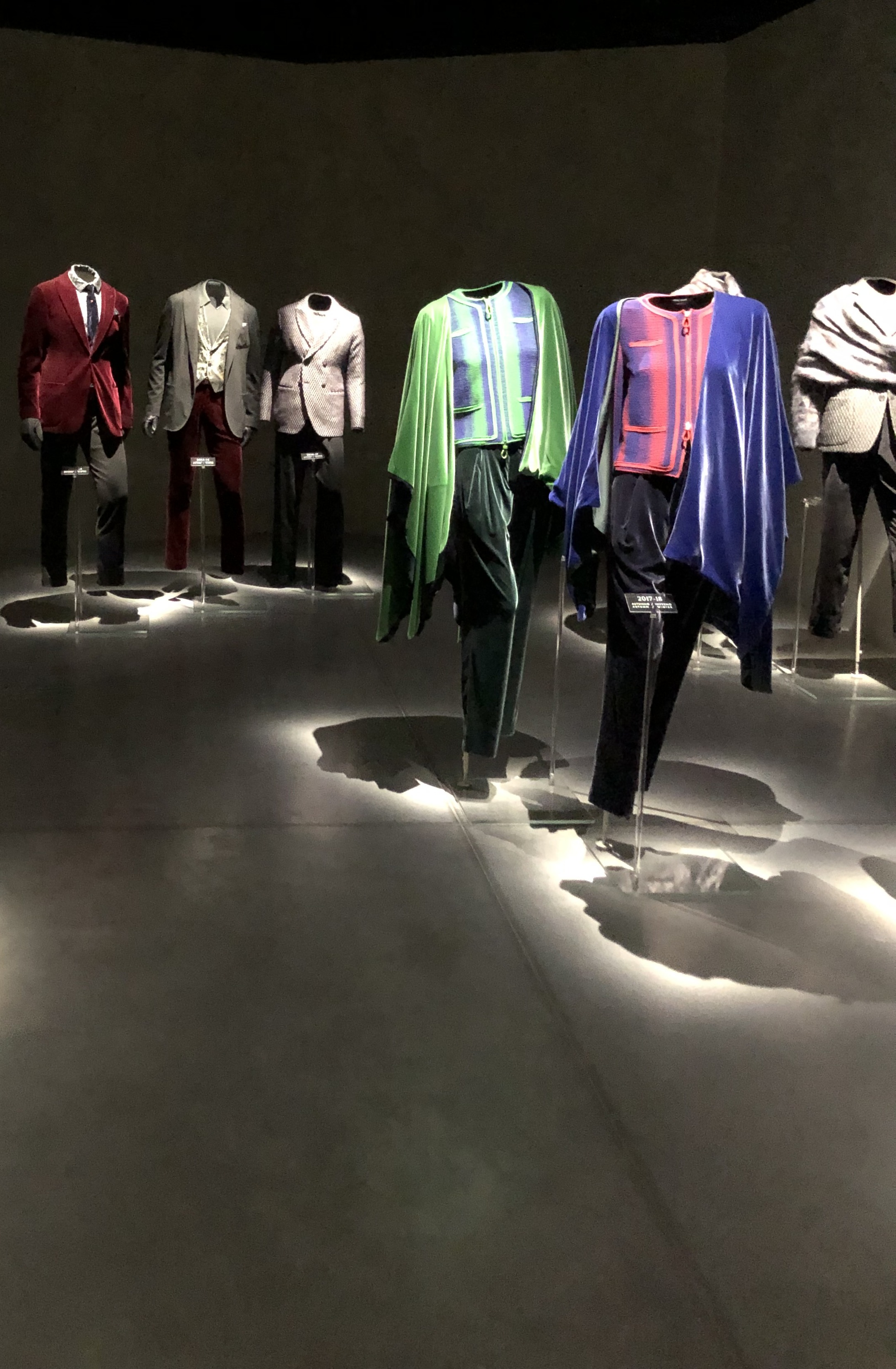
Permanent Collection

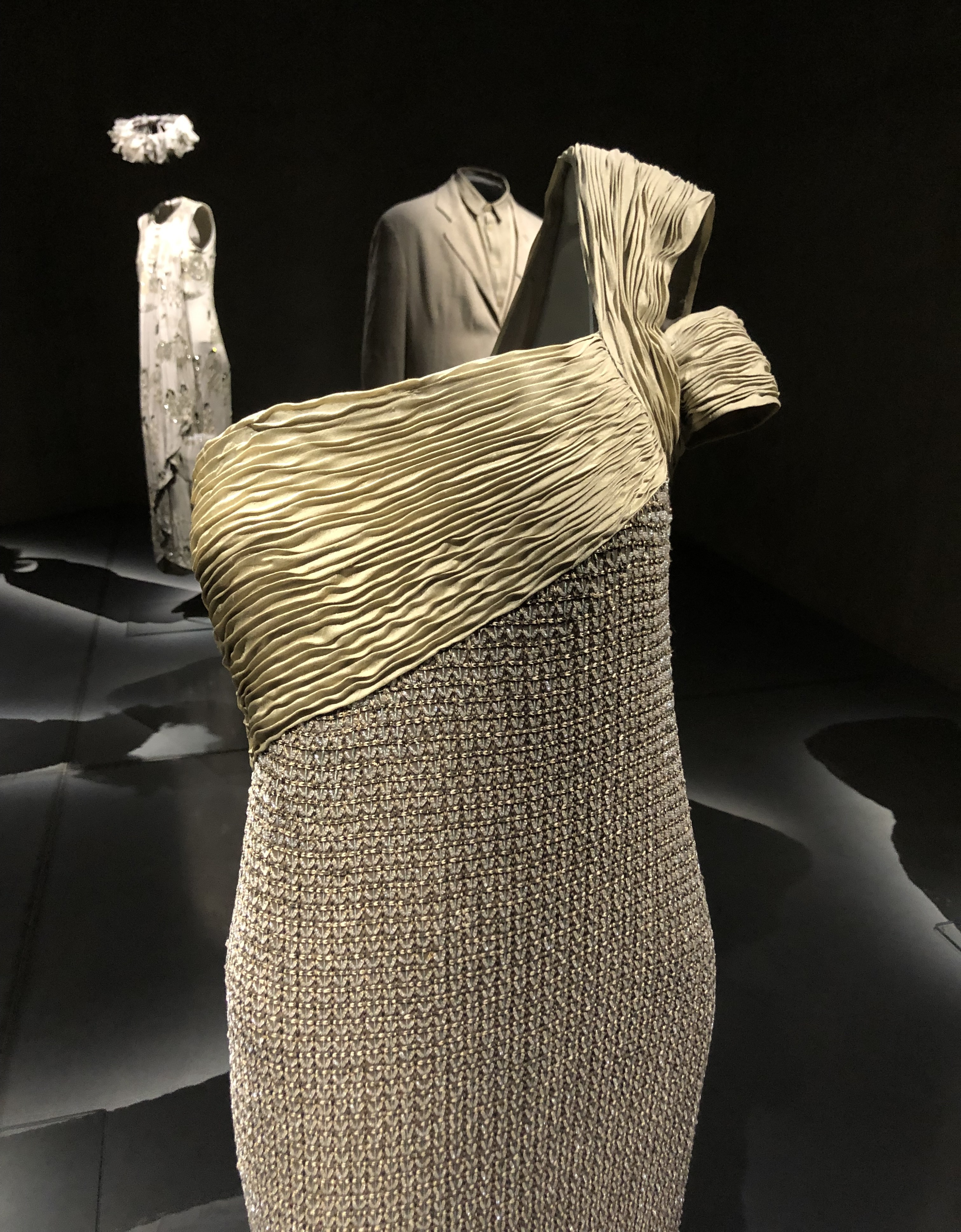
Permanent Collection

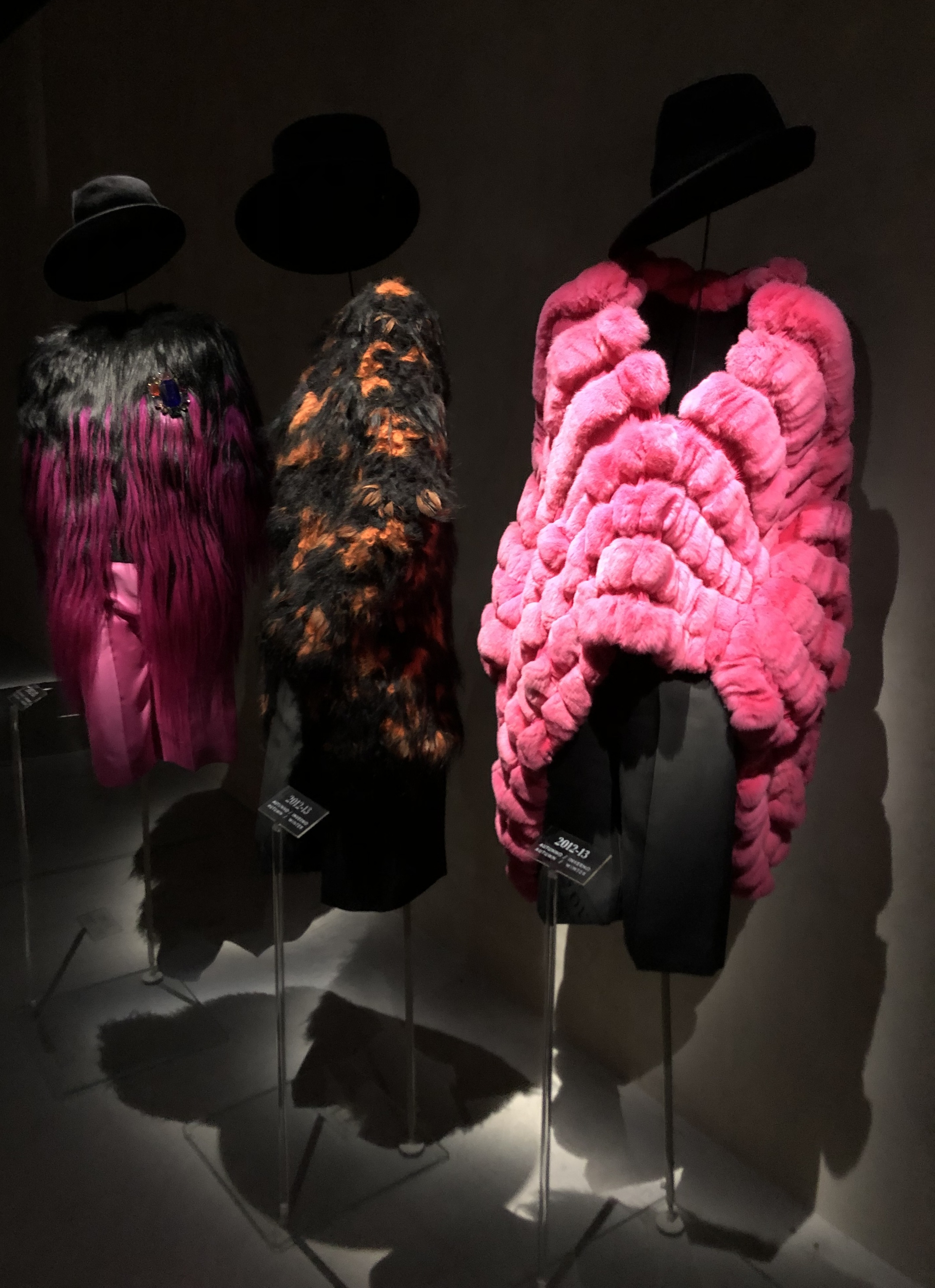
Permanent Collection

== See also ==
- List of museums in Milan
