= Porta Tenaglia =

- Quartiere of Milan
- Interactive map of Porta Tenaglia
- Coordinates: 45°28′39″N 9°10′51″E
- Country: Italy
- Region: Lombardy
- Province: Milan
- Comune: Milan
- Zone: 1
- Time zone: UTC+1 (CET)
  - Summer (DST): UTC+2 (CEST)

Porta Tenaglia (literally: "Pincer Gate") was one of the gates of the old Spanish walls of Milan, Italy. It owes its name to the so-called "Tenaglia" (pincer), a fortified walls system that embraced the north-west side of the Sforza Castle. The gate was demolished in the 16th century. Today, the phrase "Porta Tenaglia" is still in use to refer to the district ("quartiere") where the gate used to be, including the Piazzale Biancamano square and part of the Simplon Park. The Porta Tenaglia neighbourhood is part of the Zone 1 district (the city centre).
