= Zone 1 of Milan =

Coordinates: 45.471282°N 9.184999°E

Zone 1 of Milan Municipality 1
- Municipality of Milan
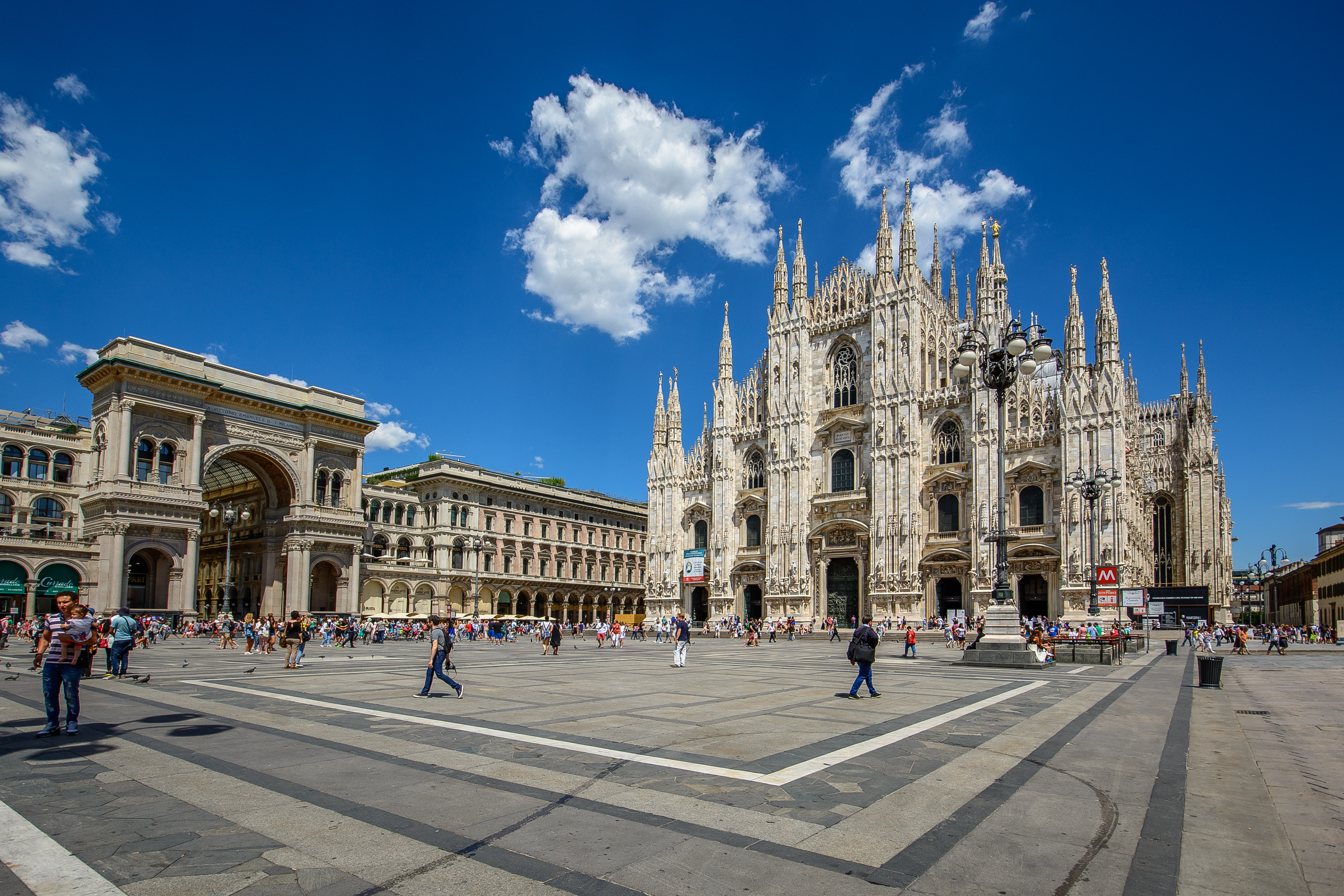
- Piazza del Duomo

- Location of Zone 1 of Milan
- Country: Italy
- Region: Lombardy
- Province: Metro City of Milan
- Comune: Milan

Government
  - President: Mattia Abdu (PD)

Area
  - Total: 3.71 sq mi (9.62 km^{2})

Population (2022)
  - Total: 97,897
  - Density: 28,680/sq mi (11,074/km^{2})
- Time zone: UTC+1 (CET)
  - Summer (DST): UTC+2 (CEST)

The Zone 1 of Milan, since 2016 officially Municipality 1 of Milan, (in Italian: Zona 1 di Milano, Municipio 1 di Milano) is one of the 9 administrative divisions of Milan, Italy.

It was officially created as an administrative subdivision during the 1980s. On 14 April 2016, to promote a reform on the municipal administrative decentralization, the City Council of Milan established the new Municipality 1, a new administrative body responsible for running most local services, such as schools, social services, waste collection, roads, parks, libraries and local commerce.

The zone includes the historical center of the city. It is the least populated of the city's zones and one of the smallest by area, a significant part of which is occupied by Piazza del Duomo, Sforza Castle and Sempione Park. A large part of the zone is dedicated to museums and administrative buildings.

== Subdivision ==
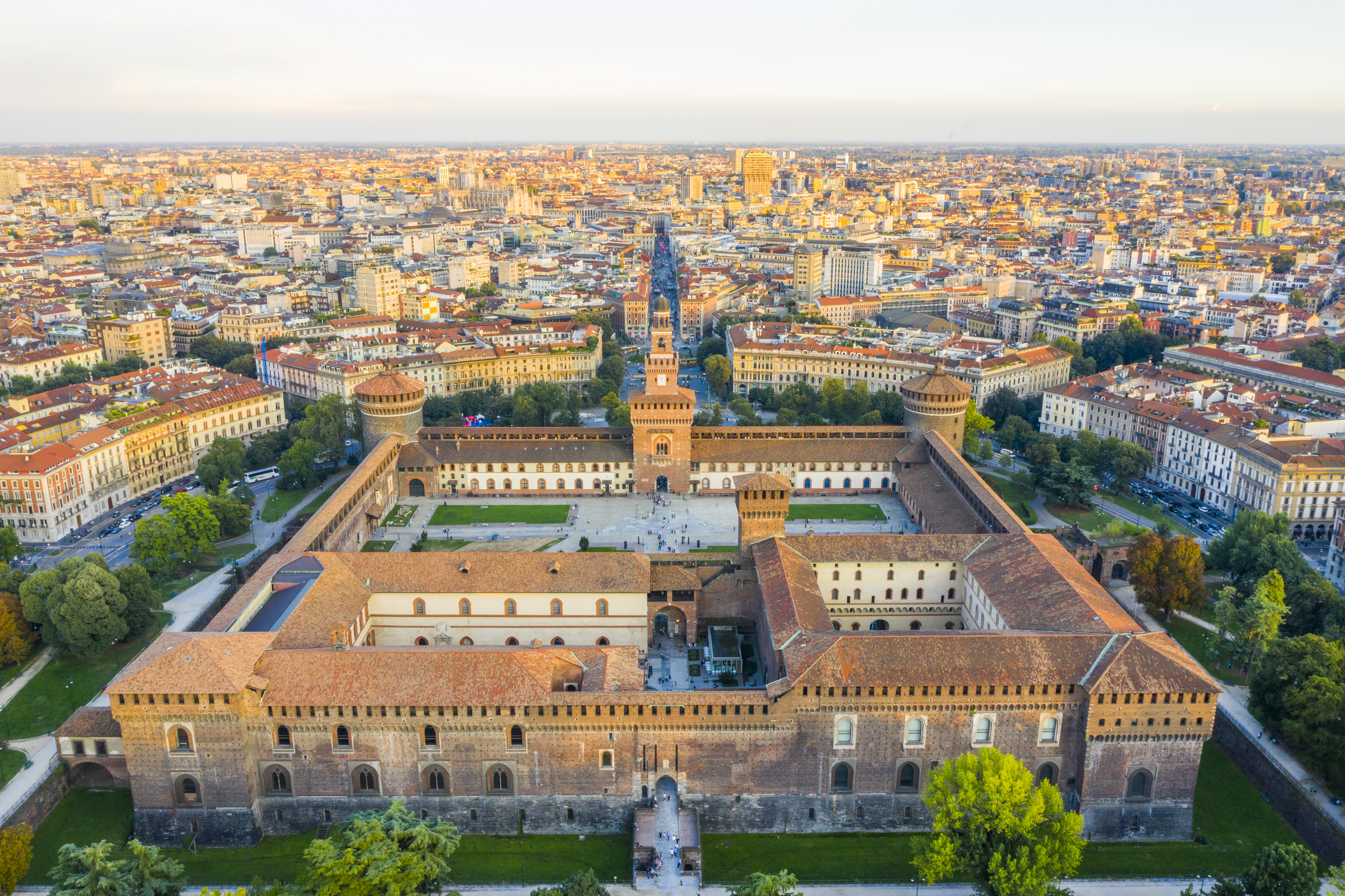
Sforza Castle

The zone includes the following districts:

- Brera, which houses the Brera Academy of Fine Arts and the Brera Art Gallery, which prominently contributed to the development of Brera as an artists' neighborhood and a place of bohemian atmosphere, sometimes referred to as "the milanese Montmartre". Both the academy and the Gallery are located in Palazzo Brera, the main historical building of the area; this same building also houses Milan's botanical garden as well as an astronomical observatory and the Braidense National Library. Other features that contribute to the character of Brera include restaurants, bars, night clubs, antique and art shops, colorful street markets, as well as fortune tellers' booths.
- Porta Sempione, a prominent historic district that also includes part of Corso Sempione, a large avenue leading to Porta Sempione from the northwest. The main landmark of this area is the Sforza Castle, which dominates the Sempione Park, the largest and most important city park in the centre of Milan. The park houses other renowned monuments and places of interest, such as the Branca Tower, the Palazzo dell'Arte (one of the seats of the Triennale art expo), sculptures by Giorgio de Chirico, and the public aquarium. The whole area is one of the centres of the so-called "Milanese movida", with a number of bars, pubs, restaurants, and discos; since the RAI public television company, as well as some major radio stations, have their headquarters in the area, frequent appearances of celebrities contribute to the popularity of the Sempione's night life venues.
- Porta Venezia, a medieval district nowadays characterized by many neoclassical buildings. Some of the most important buildings in the area include Palazzo Saporiti, Palazzo Serbelloni, Palazzo Castiglioni and Villa Reale. The Gardens of Porta Venezia (recently renamed "Indro Montanelli Gardens") house the Museum of Natural History as well as the Planetarium. The district has a long history of foreign immigration and has developed over the last decades as one of the multi-ethnic areas of Milan, to the point that it is sometimes referred to as Milan's "African district" or Milan's casbah. Another specific trait of Porta Venezia is the number of night life venues, such as restaurants (many of them started by immigrants and serving African, Asian, or South American cuisine) and "trendy" and underground night clubs; for this reason, Porta Venezia is one of the centres of the so-called "Milanese movida". The district also houses some of the most important LBGT venues in Milan, such as the "Lelephant" and the "Atomic Bar".
- Sarpi, which includes a large portion of the Milanese Chinatown, home of the oldest and largest Chinese community in Italy. Originally established during the 1920s by immigrants who used to operate small textile and leather workshops, today the district is filled with hairdressing salons, fashion boutiques, silk and leather stores, libraries, traveling agencies, medicine centres and massage parlours. The Chinese takeaways and restaurants in the area are mostly specialised in Zhejiang cuisine. Several Italian-Chinese companies are also headquartered in the neighborhood, including the editorial desk of the newspaper Europe China Daily. Via Paolo Sarpi is the main street and is largely a pedestrian area.
- Porta Tenaglia;
- Ticinese;
- Duomo;
- Magenta-San Vittore;
- Quadronno;
- Pagano;

=== Sestieri ===
As many cities in Italy, the historic centre of Milan is also subdivided into many historical sestieri, medieval subdivisions themselves subdivided into different contrade.

Sestiere		Coat of arms	Contrade	Nobles Contrade: Farine • Cicogna • Sant'Ambrogio Rosa • Cordusio • Bossi Contrada capitana: Aquila (seat of Palazzo della Ragione, Milan's medieval town hall)
1	Porta Orientale		1. Contrada del Verzaro; 2. Nobile Contrada delle Farine; 3. Contrada dell'Agnello (Lamb); 4. Contrada della Cerva (Doe); 5. Contrada di Bagutta	Nobles Contrade: Farine • Cicogna • Sant'Ambrogio Rosa • Cordusio • Bossi Contrada capitana: Aquila (seat of Palazzo della Ragione, Milan's medieval town hall)
2	Porta Romana		6. Contrada del Falcone (Falcon); 7. Nobile Contrada della Cicogna (Stork); 8. Contrada del Fieno (Hay); 9. Contrada del Brolo; 10. Contrada delle Capre (Goats)	Nobles Contrade: Farine • Cicogna • Sant'Ambrogio Rosa • Cordusio • Bossi Contrada capitana: Aquila (seat of Palazzo della Ragione, Milan's medieval town hall)
3	Porta Ticinese		11. Contrada della Lupa (She-wolf); 12. Nobile Contrada di Sant'Ambrogio; 13. Contrada delle Cornacchie (Crows); 14. Contrada del Torchio; 15. Contrada della Vetra	Nobles Contrade: Farine • Cicogna • Sant'Ambrogio Rosa • Cordusio • Bossi Contrada capitana: Aquila (seat of Palazzo della Ragione, Milan's medieval town hall)
4	Porta Vercellina		16. Contrada della Piscina; 17. Nobile Contrada della Rosa (Rose); 18. Contrada dei Morigi; 19. Contrada della Porta; 20. Contrada del Nirone	Nobles Contrade: Farine • Cicogna • Sant'Ambrogio Rosa • Cordusio • Bossi Contrada capitana: Aquila (seat of Palazzo della Ragione, Milan's medieval town hall)
5	Porta Comasina		21. Nobile Contrada del Cordusio; 22. Contrada del Rovello; 23. Contrada dell'Orso (Bear); 24. Contrada del Campo (Field); 25. Contrada dei Fiori (Flowers)	Nobles Contrade: Farine • Cicogna • Sant'Ambrogio Rosa • Cordusio • Bossi Contrada capitana: Aquila (seat of Palazzo della Ragione, Milan's medieval town hall)
6	Porta Nuova		26. Contrada dell'Aquila (Eagle); 27. Nobile Contrada dei Bossi; 28. Contrada della Mazza; 29. Contrada degli Andegari; 30. Contrada della Spiga (Ear)	Nobles Contrade: Farine • Cicogna • Sant'Ambrogio Rosa • Cordusio • Bossi Contrada capitana: Aquila (seat of Palazzo della Ragione, Milan's medieval town hall)

=== Fashion district ===
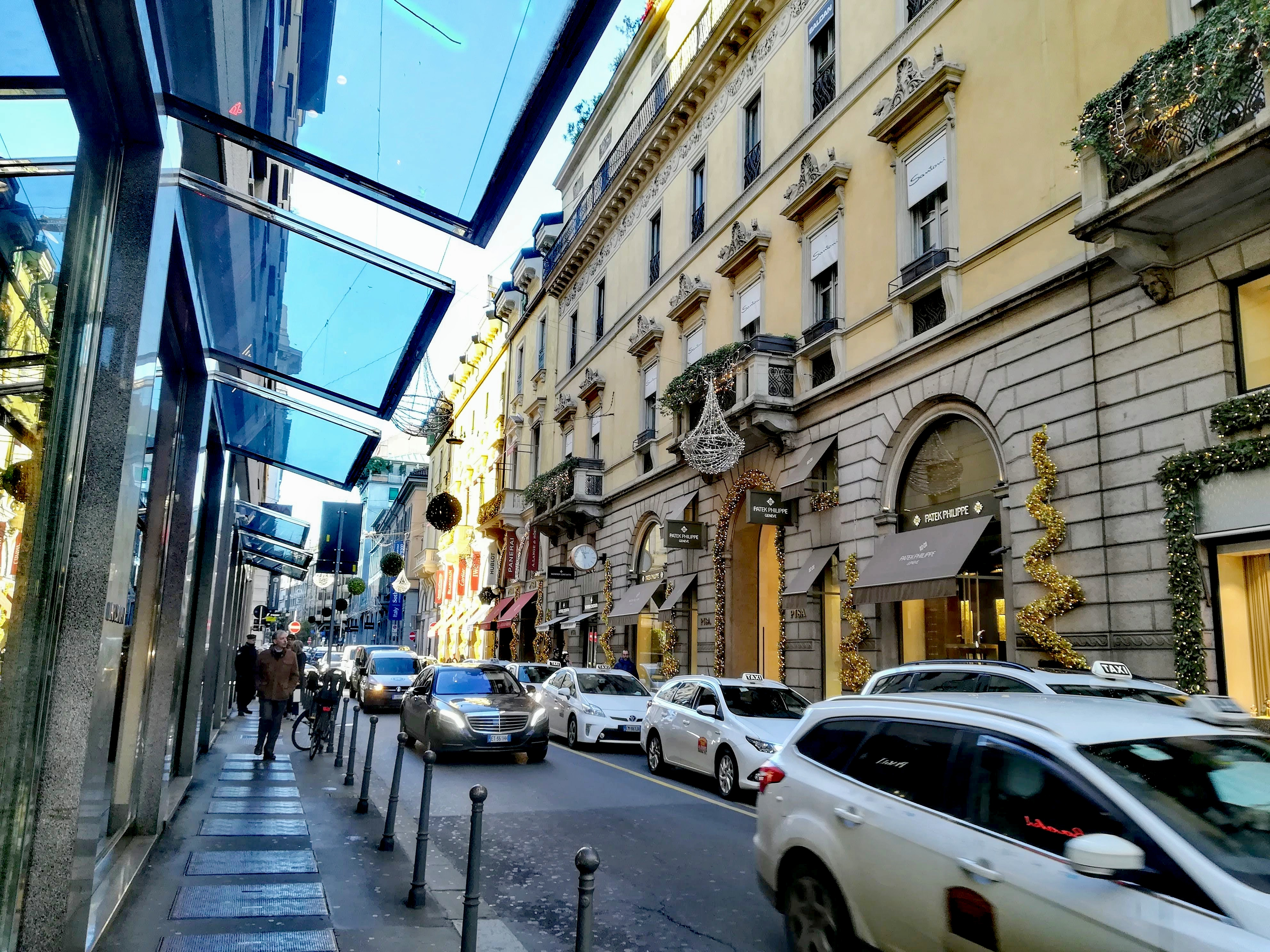
Via Verri in the fashion district.

Quadrilatero della moda (Italian pronunciation: [kwadriˈlaːtero della ˈmɔːda]; literally "fashion square"), or Via Montenapoleone fashion district, is the high-class shopping district in the centre of the zone, characterized by the presence of numerous boutiques and related retail outlets which represent most of the world's major fashion houses.

The sides of the square, located to the south of the arches of Porta Nuova, are formed by Via Montenapoleone, Via Manzoni, Via della Spiga and Corso Venezia.

Streets inside this area include Via Borgospesso, Via Santo Spirito, Via Gesù, Via Sant'Andrea, Via Bagutta, and Via Baggutino. The zone extends in practice also to the north-west of Via Manzoni with Via Pisoni, and to the south and west of Via Montenapoleone with Corso Giacomo Matteotti (this last meets Corso Venezia at Piazza San Babila), Piazza Meda, Via San Pietro all'Orto, and Via Verri.

== Government ==
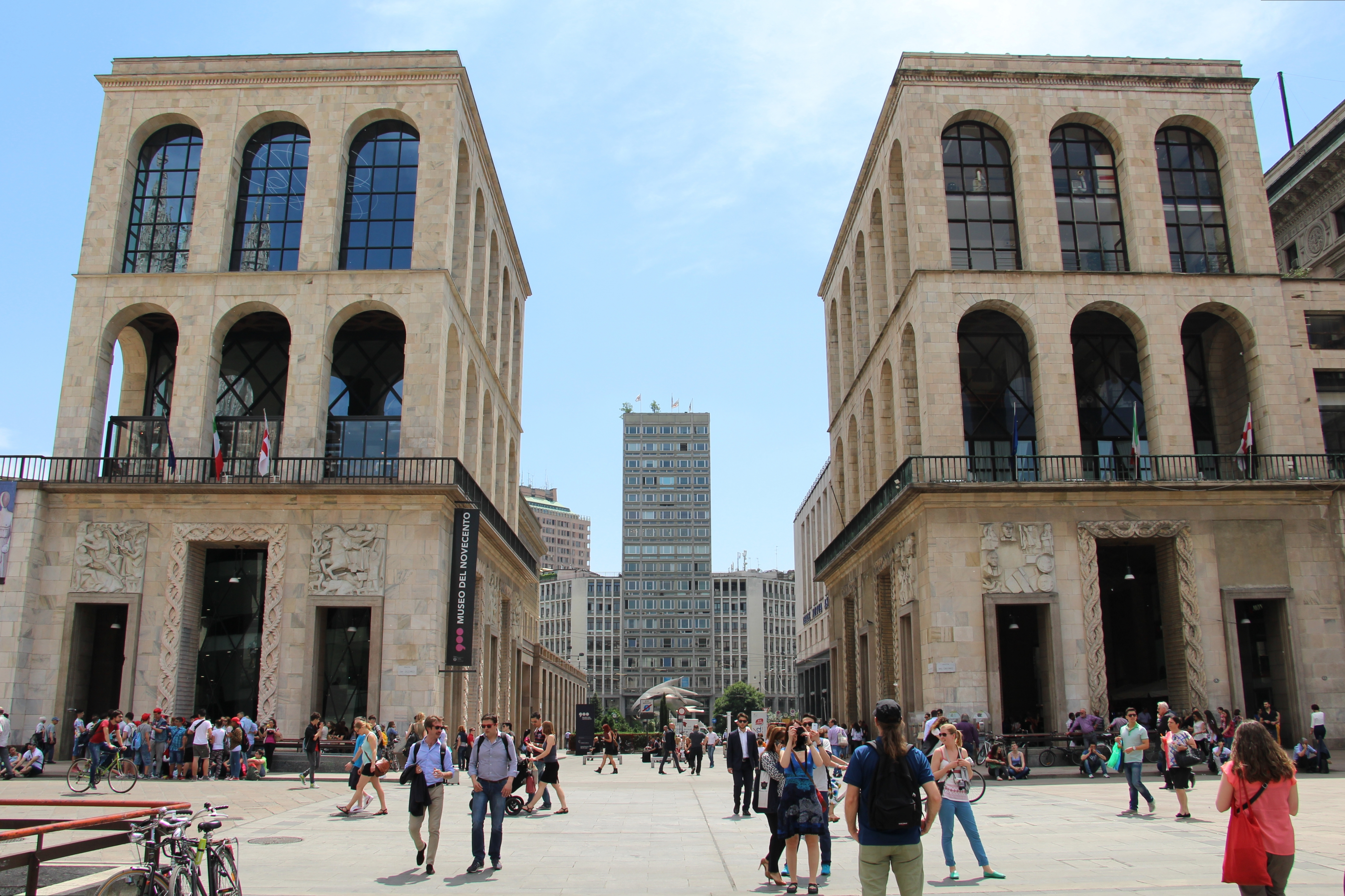
Palazzo dell'Arengario complex in Piazza del Duomo. The western structure (right) is the seat of the Municipal Council of Zone 1, while the eastern (left) houses Museo del Novecento

The area has its own local authority called Consiglio di Municipio (Municipal Council), composed by a president and 30 members directly elected by citizens every five years. The council is responsible for most local services, such as schools, social services, waste collection, roads, parks, libraries and local commerce in the area, and manages funds (if any) provided by the city government for specific purposes, such as those intended to guarantee the right to education for poorer families.

The current president is Mattia Abdu (PD). He was elected in the 2021 Milan municipal election together with the 30-member Municipal Council, whose composition is shown below:

Alliance or political party	Members		Composition
Alliance or political party	2021–2026		Composition
Centre-left (PD-EV)	21	21 / 30	
Centre-right (FI-Lega-FdI)	9	9 / 30	

Here is a full lists of the directly elected Presidents of Municipio since 2011:

President	Term of office		Party
Fabio Luigi Arrigoni	16 May 2011	8 October 2021	PD
Mattia Abdu	8 October 2021	Incumbent	PD

== Gates ==
In the past the city Milan had three different systems of defending walls. The oldest one, Roman walls were developed in two stages, the first in the Republican and the second in the Imperial era. The second wall system was realized during the Middle Ages, after the destruction of the city by Frederick I Barbarossa. Finally, the latest wall system was built by the Spanish rulers in the 16th century. While very little remains of these walls, their structure is clearly reflected in the urbanistic layout of the city with several main gates still marking the entrance in the historical centre of the city. In particular, modern Milan has two roughly circular rings of streets, namely the "Cerchia dei Navigli" and the "Cerchia dei Bastioni", which essentially correspond to the Medieval and Spanish walls, respectively.

Main gates which still today mark the entrance to Zone 1 are:

- Porta Sempione, with the Arch of Peace. Already part of the Roman walls, it was called Porta Giovia ("Jupiter's Gate") and was located at the end of modern Via San Giovanni sul Muro. Very little remains of the original Roman structure. In the Middle Age, part of the Roman walls in the Porta Sempione area was adapted as part of the new walls. The gate itself was moved north, in a place that is now occupied by the Sforza Castle. In 1807, under the Napoleonic rule, the Arch of Peace was built by architect Luigi Cagnola. This new gate marked the place where the new Strada del Sempione entered Milan. This road, which is still in use today, connects Milan to Paris through the Simplon Pass crossing the Alps.
- Porta Venezia, originally known as Porta Orientale ("Eastern Gate"). Already part of the Roman walls, it was renewed in neoclassic style during the first half of the 19th century.
- Porta Ticinese.
- Porta Nuova.
- Porta Romana.
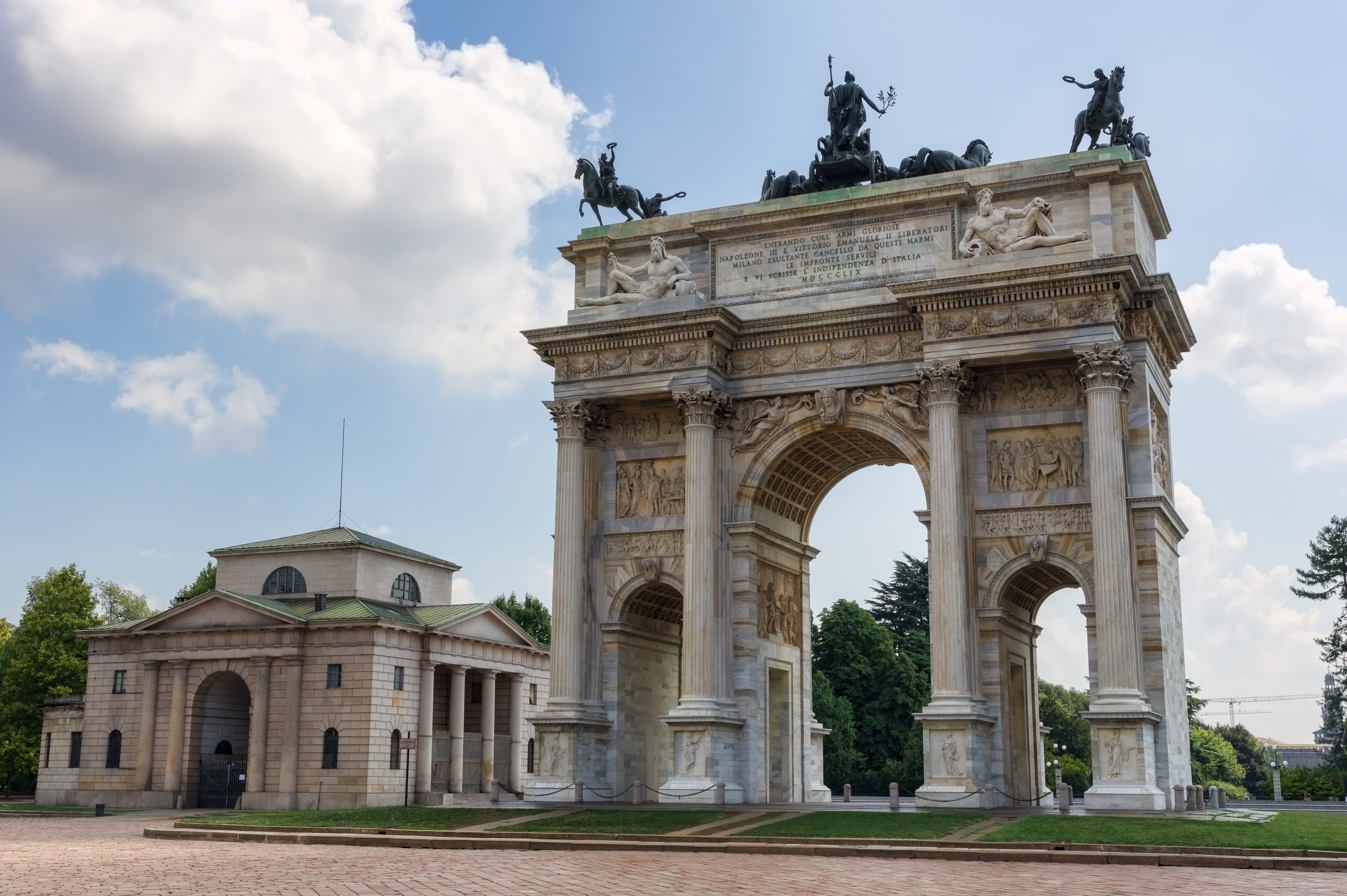
Arch of Peace in Porta Sempione

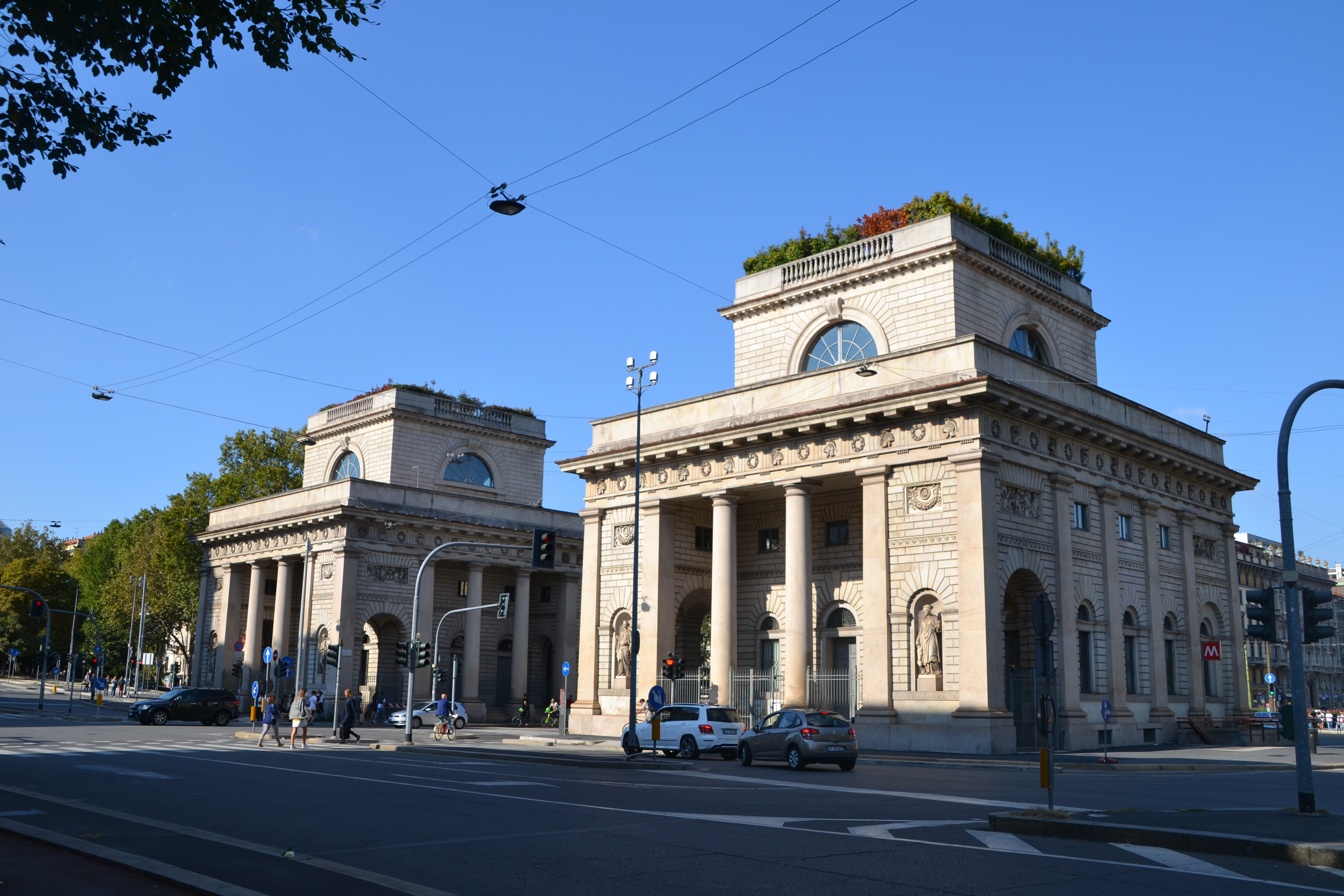
Porta Venezia

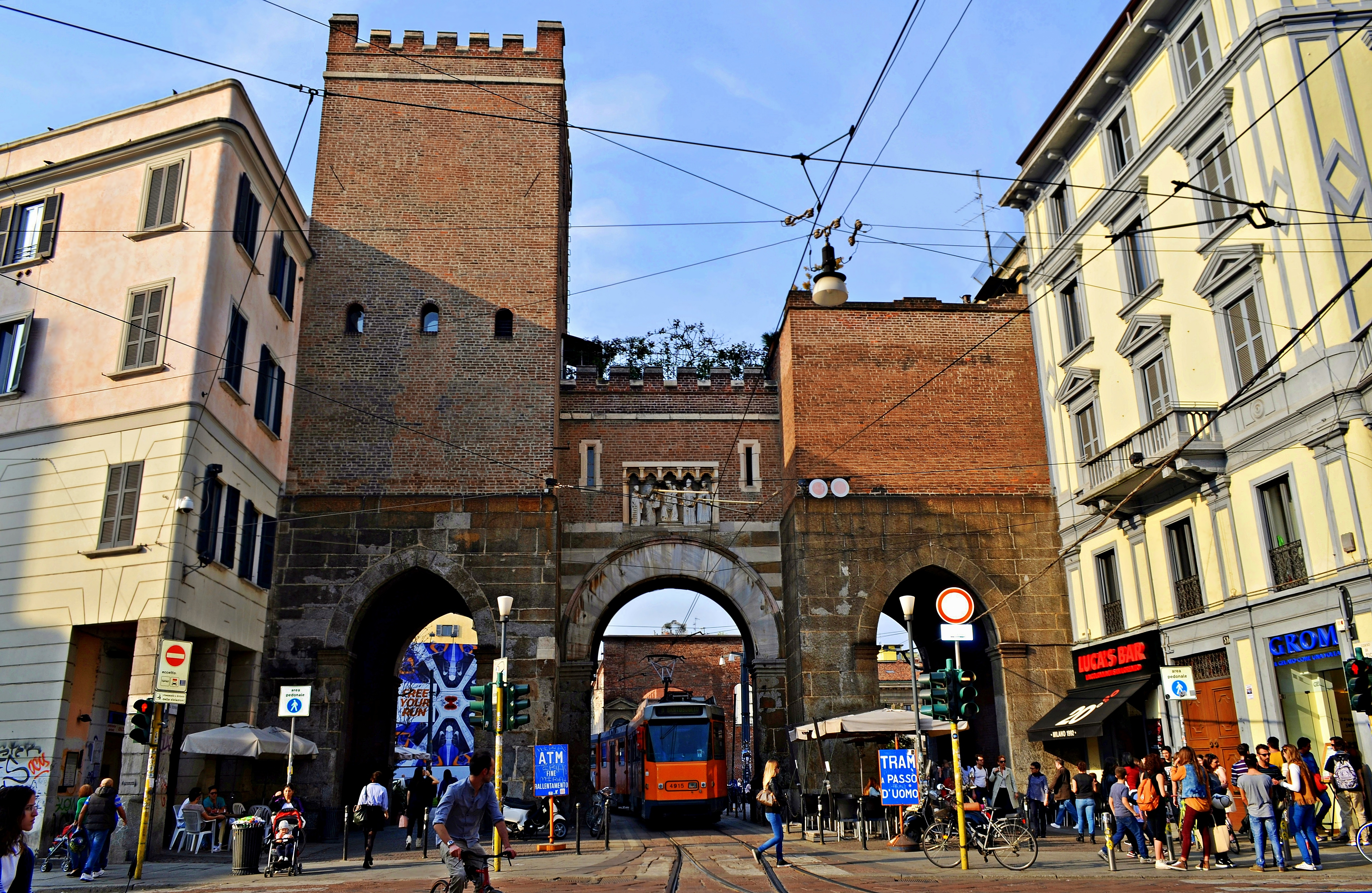
Porta Ticinese

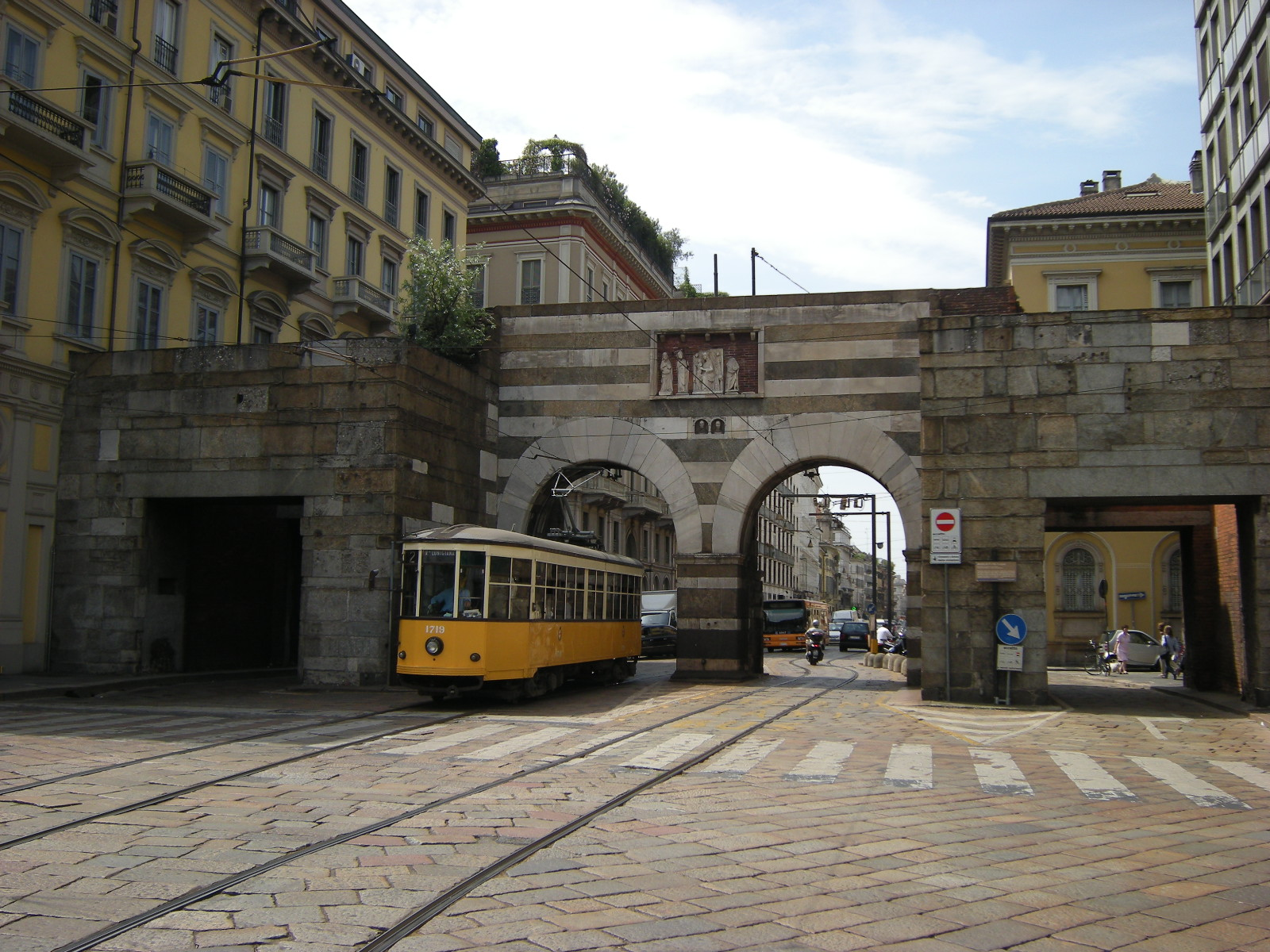
Porta Nuova

== Squares ==
The zone is characterized by the presence of many squares (Italian: piazze), among which the most famous are:

- Piazza del Duomo, which marks the exact center of the city and includes some of the most important buildings of Milan, as well some of the most prestigious commercial activities, and it is by far the foremost tourist attraction of the city.
- Piazza della Scala, named after the renowned Teatro alla Scala opera house, which occupies the north-western side of the square.
- Piazza San Babila, created during the 1930s.
- Piazza San Fedele, sited in front of at the homonymous San Fedele Church.
- Piazza Cordusio, well known for its several neoclassical, eclectic and Art Nouveau buildings, banks and post offices.
- Piazza Affari, seat of the Italian Bourse.
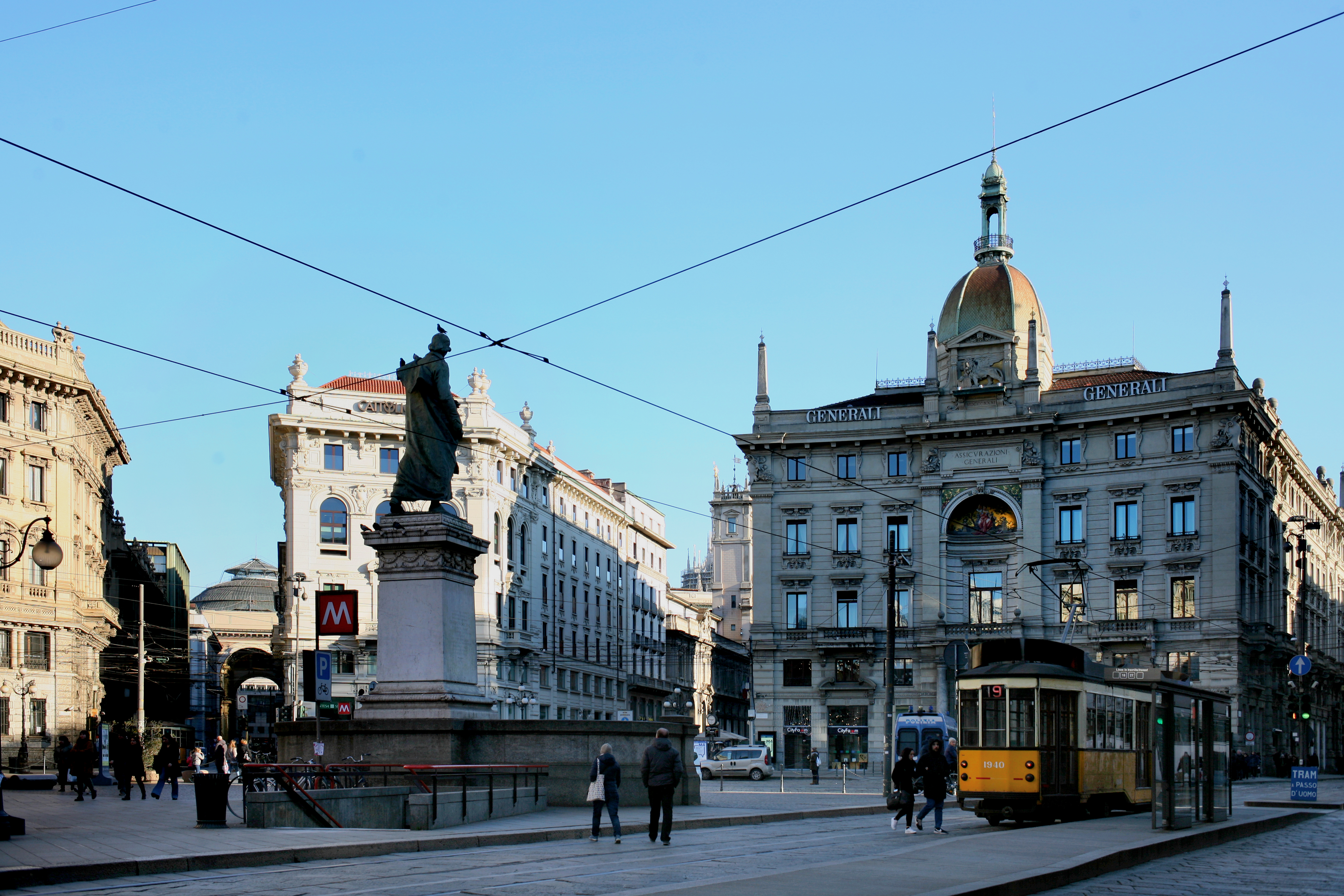
Piazza Cordusio

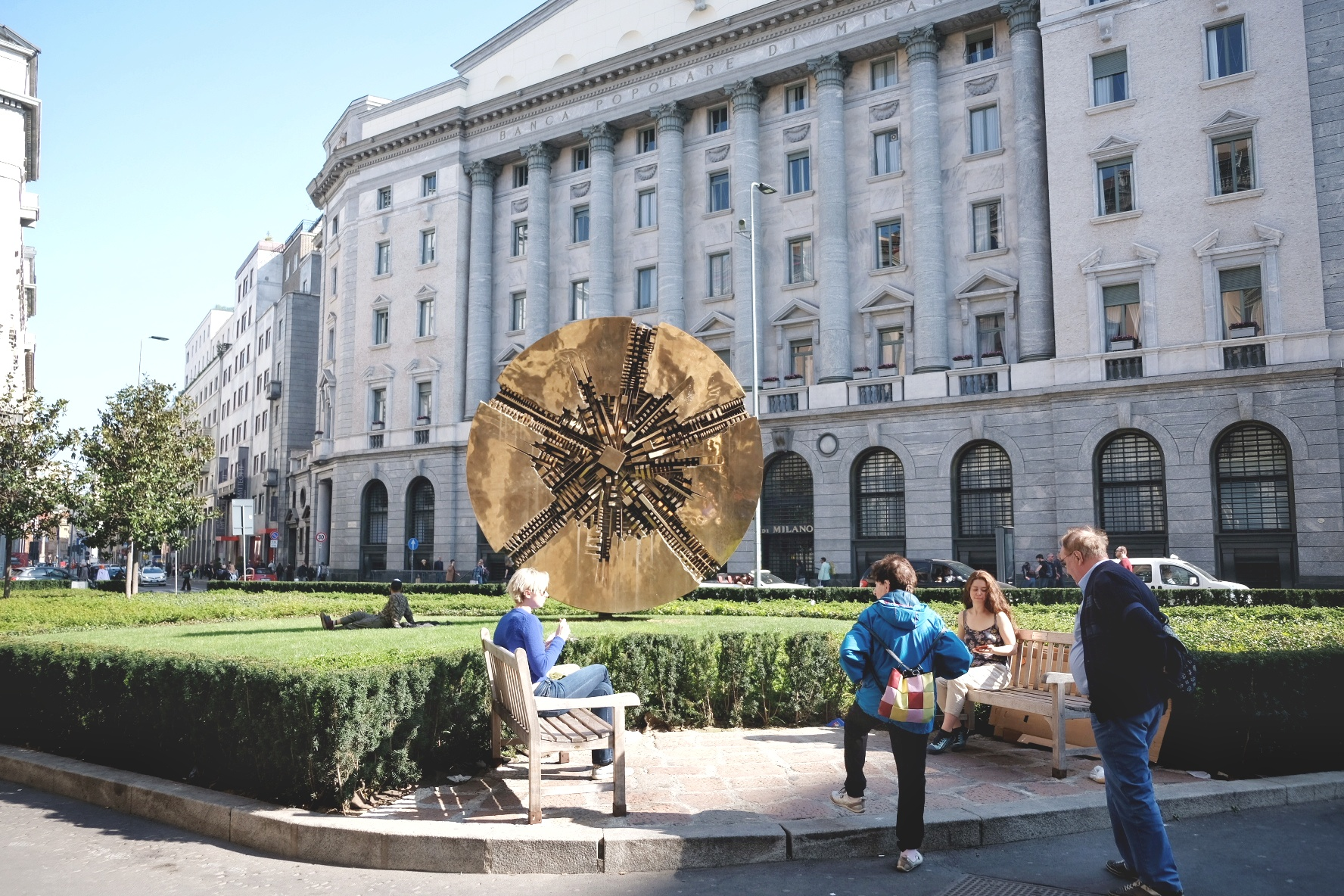
Piazza Meda with Arnaldo Pomodoro's Grande Disco (1972)

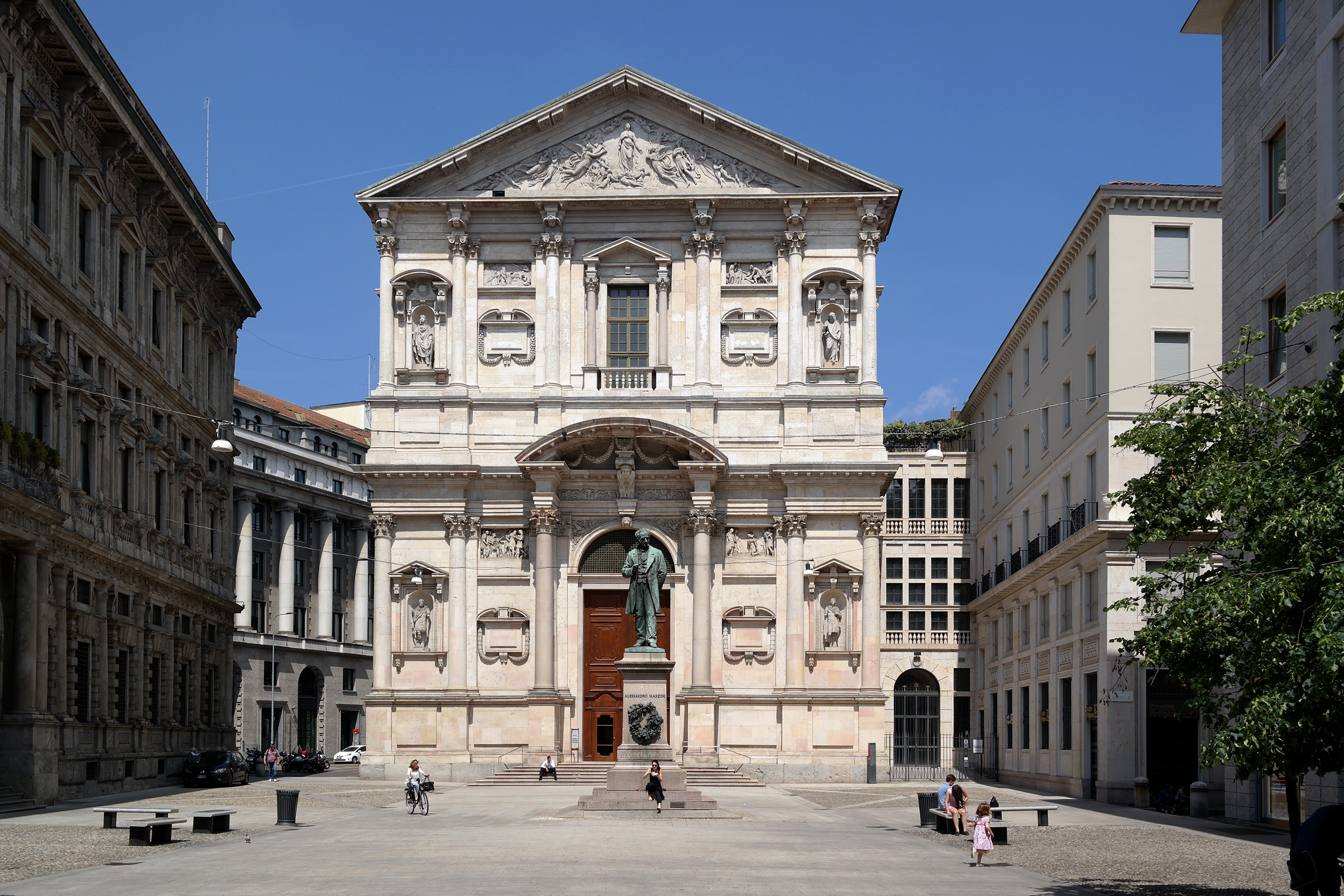
Monument to Alessandro Manzoni in Piazza San Fedele
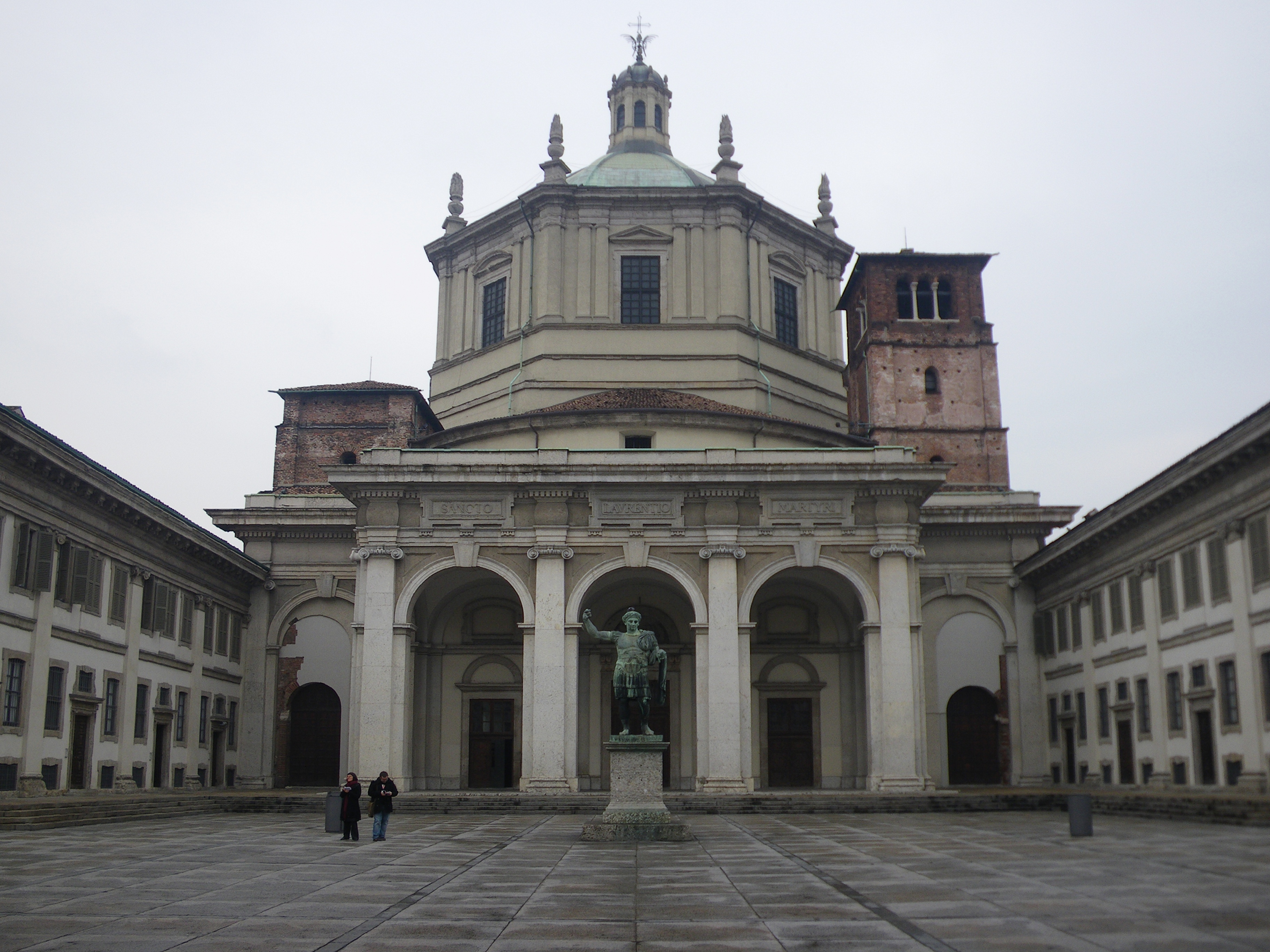
Monument to Emperor Constantine in front of San Lorenzo Basilica

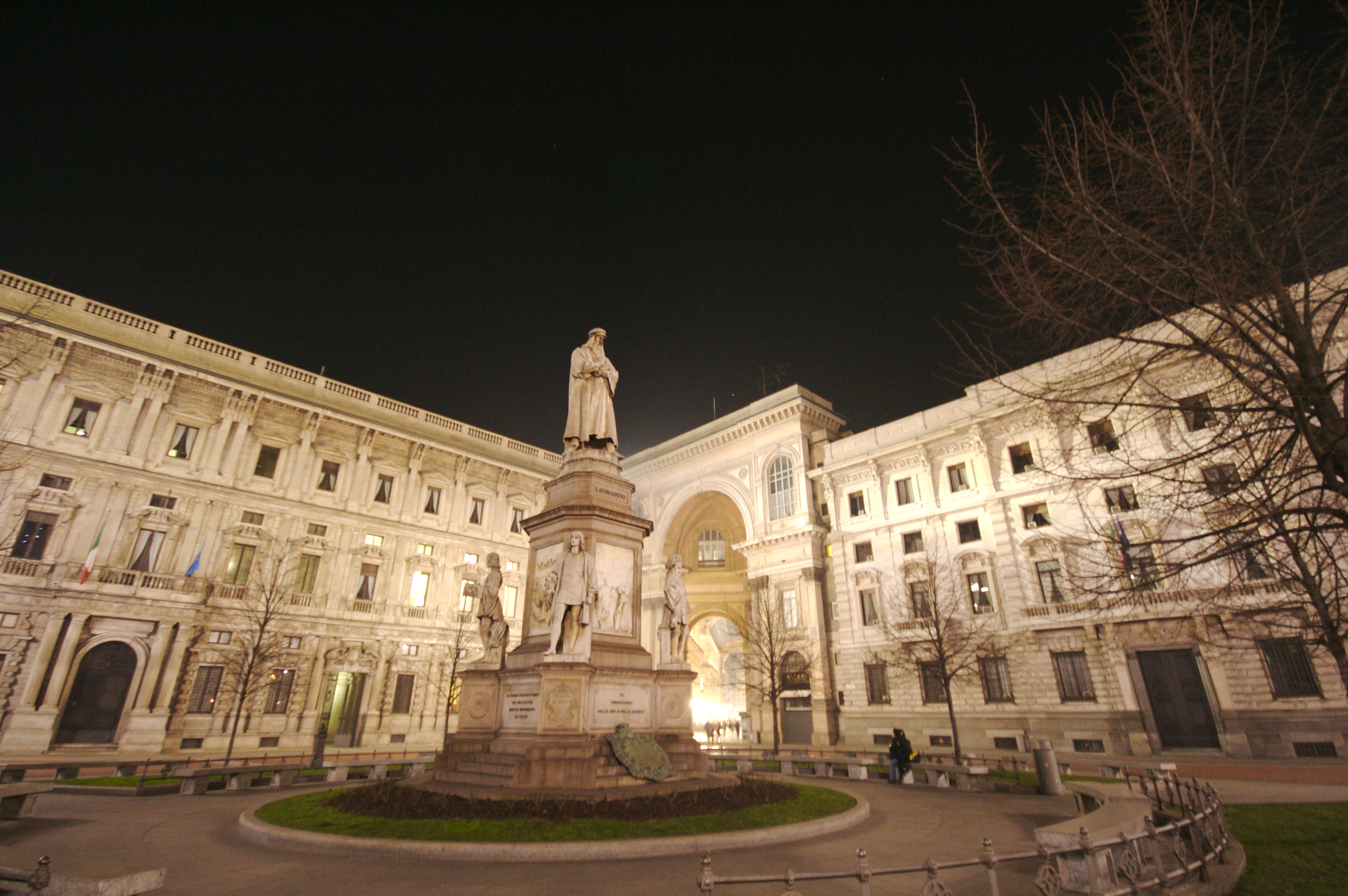
Monument to Leonardo in Piazza della Scala

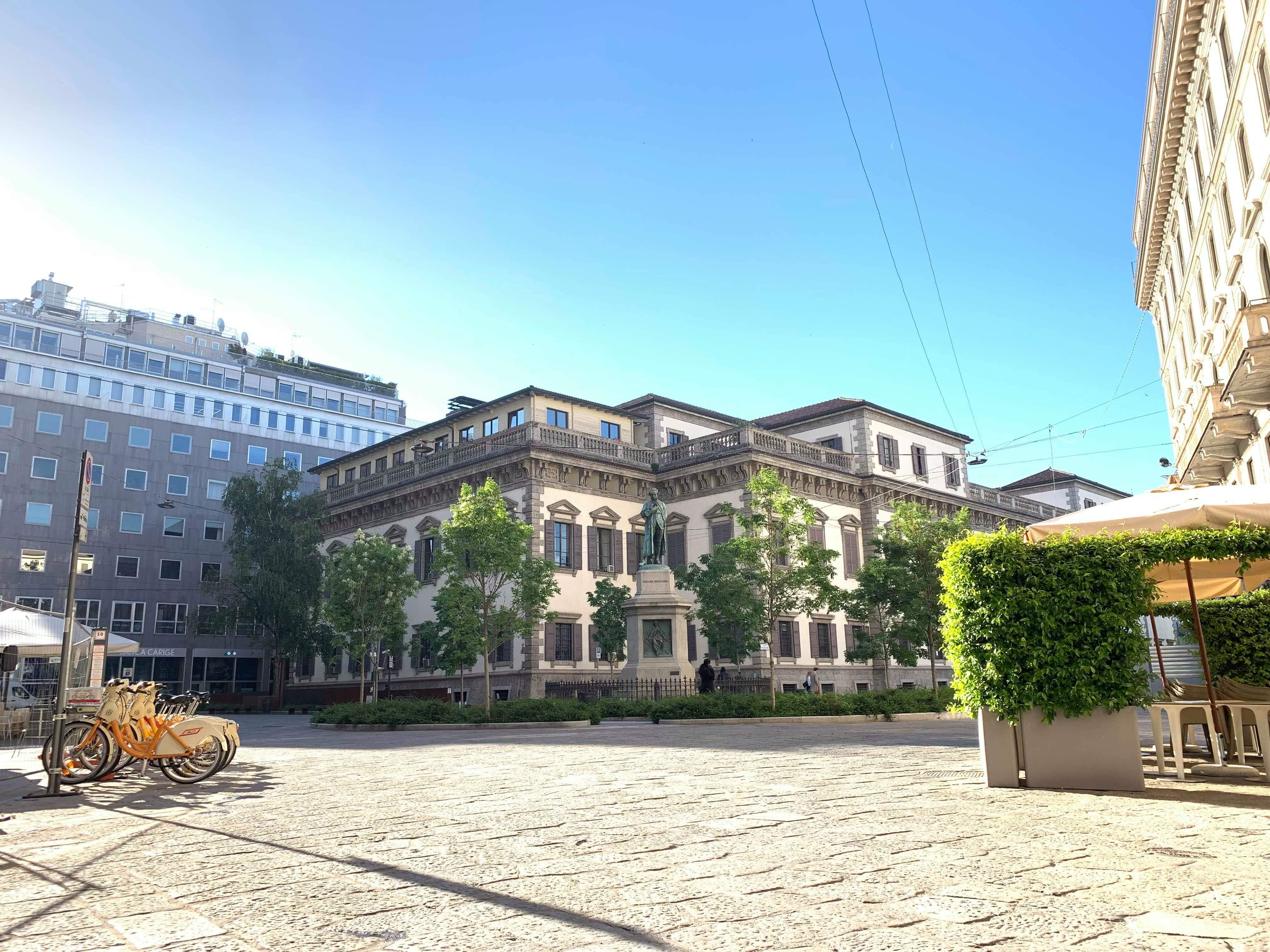
Monument to Cesare Beccaria in Piazza Beccaria

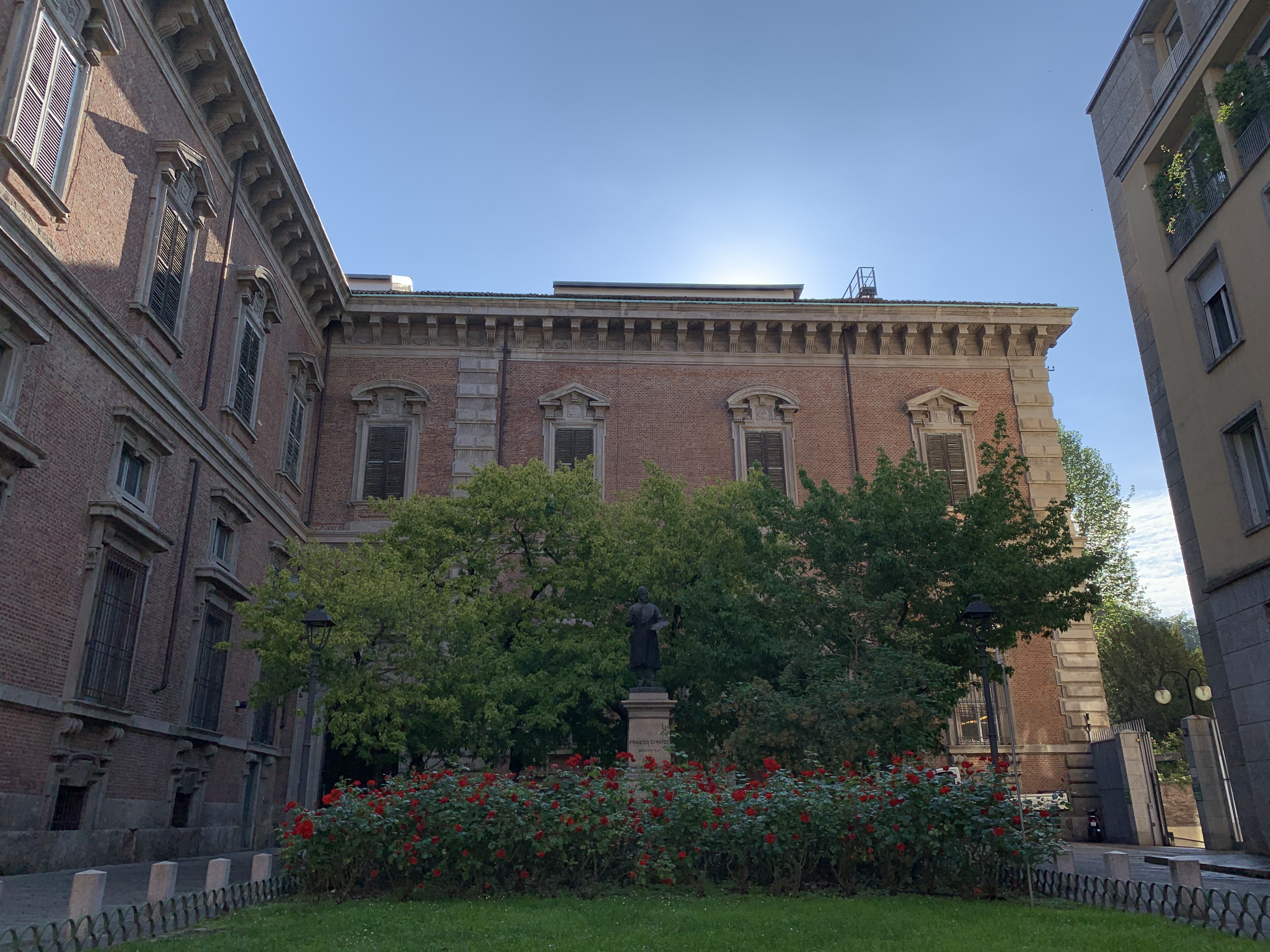
Monument to Francesco Hayez in Piazza Brera

== Education ==
Thanks to its central position, the zone houses some prominent educational institutions. In this area are located the main buildings of many higher education institutions:

- University of Milan, founded in 1924, is located not so far from the Piazza del Duomo. At the end of the Second World War, the old Ospedale dei Poveri (Hospital for the Poor) building, known as "la Cà Granda" (the Big House), was assigned to the University. The building, one of the first Italian examples of civil architecture – commissioned in the 15th century by the Sforza family, the dukes of Milan – was seriously damaged by the bombings of 1943. In 1958, after a complex series of reconstruction and renovation works, it became home to the University Rector's Office, the administrative offices and the schools of Law and Humanities.
- Brera Academy of Fine Arts, founded in 1776 by Maria Theresa of Austria, is located in the Brera district. It shared premises with other cultural and scientific institutions – the astronomical observatory, the Orto Botanico di Brera, the Scuole Palatine for philosophy and law, the Gymnasium, laboratories for physics and chemistry, the Biblioteca di Brera, the agricultural society and, from 1806, the Pinacoteca di Brera or art gallery. These were housed in the Palazzo Brera, which was built in about 1615 to designs by Francesco Maria Richini and until the suppression of the Jesuits in 1773 had been a Jesuit college.
- Conservatory of Milan, college music established in 1807 by royal decree. Today it is the largest institute of musical education in Italy.
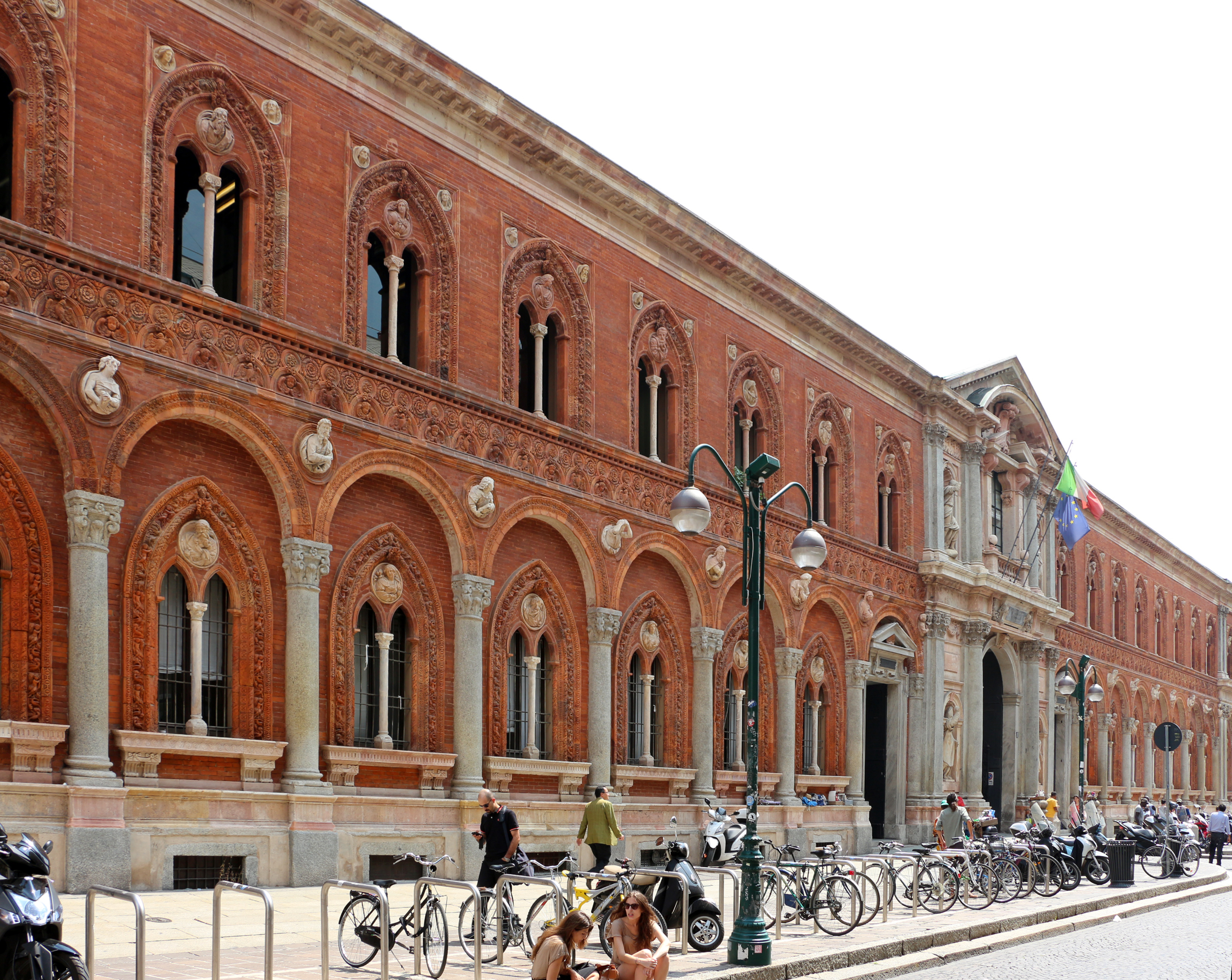
University of Milan headquarter

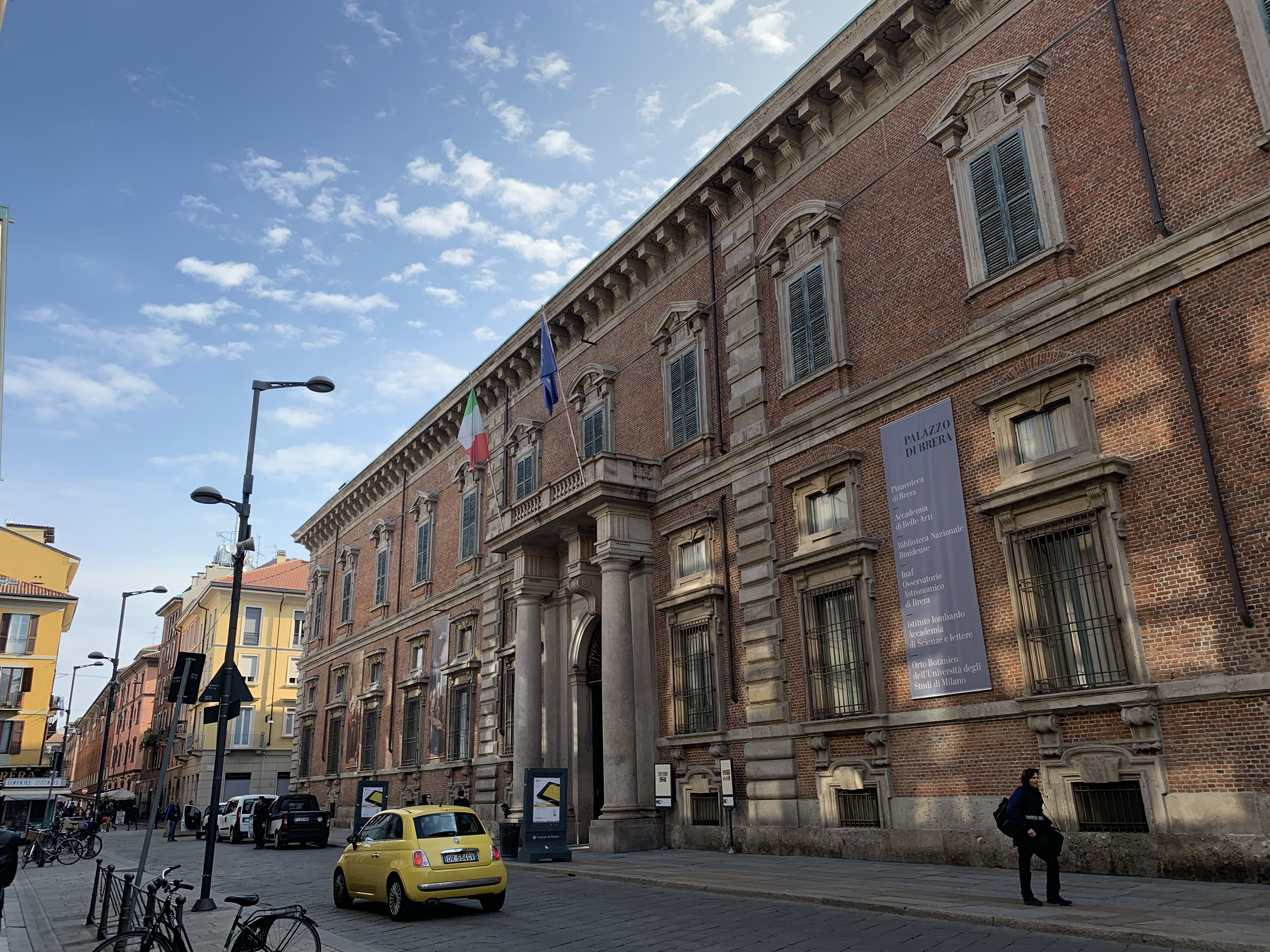
Brera Academy

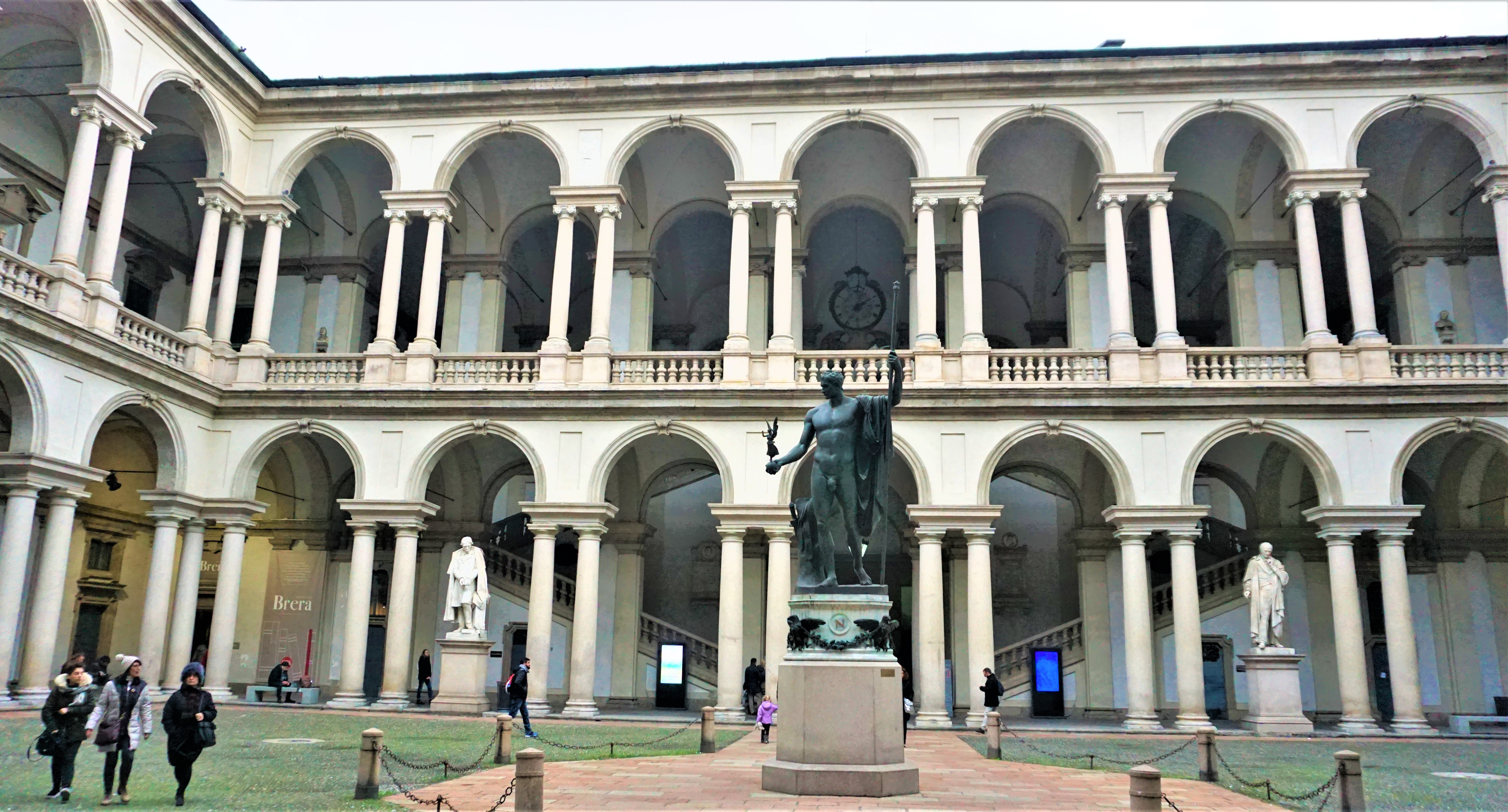
Brera Academy internal courtyard

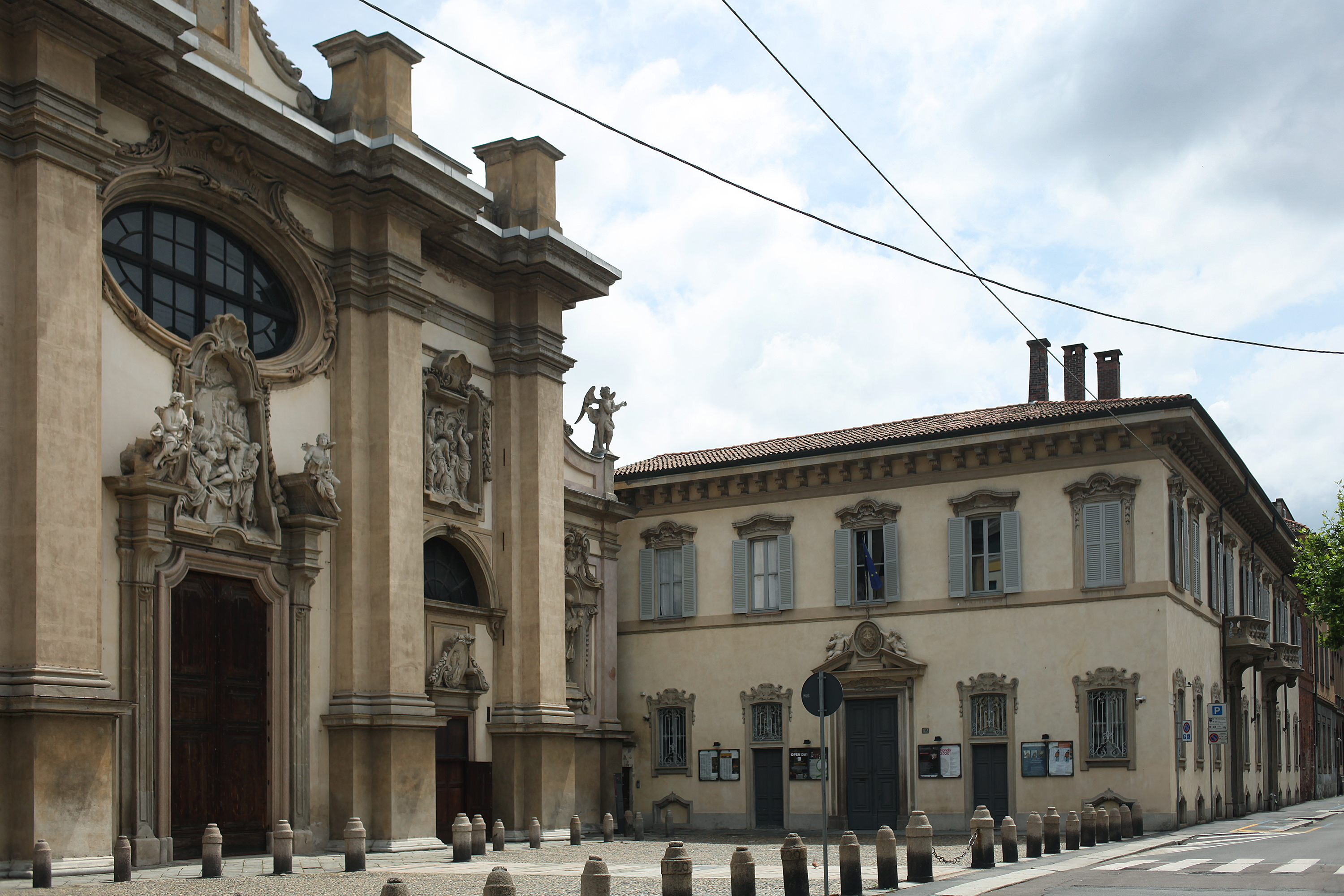
Conservatory main entrance

== Museums ==
The zone houses all the most important museums of the city. The main are:

- Royal Palace, cultural center which homes many international temporary exhibitions.
- Triennale, a design and art museum in which homes the Milan Triennial of art and design exhibition.
- Pinacoteca di Brera, the main public gallery for paintings in Milan.
- Diocesan Museum of Milan, conceived by Ildefonso Schuster in 1931 as a vehicle to protect and promote the art collection of the Archdiocese of Milan.
- Museo del Novecento, opened in 2010. Seated in Palazzo dell'Arengario near Piazza del Duomo, it's one of the most important museums of modern art in Italy.
- Gallerie di Piazza Scala, a modern and contemporary museum located in Palazzo Brentani and in Palazzo Anguissola Antona Traversi in Piazza della Scala. It hosts many artworks from the collections of Fondazione Cariplo with a strong representation of the 19th century Lombard painters and sculptors, including Antonio Canova and Umberto Boccioni. A new section was opened in the Palazzo della Banca Commerciale Italiana on 25 October 2012 with 189 art works from the 20th century.
- Natural History Museum, founded in 1838 when the naturalist Giuseppe de Cristoforis donated his collections to the city.
- Museo Nazionale Scienza e Tecnologia Leonardo da Vinci, founded in 1953, is the largest science and technology museum in Italy and is dedicated to Italian painter and scientist Leonardo da Vinci.
- Galleria d'Arte Moderna.
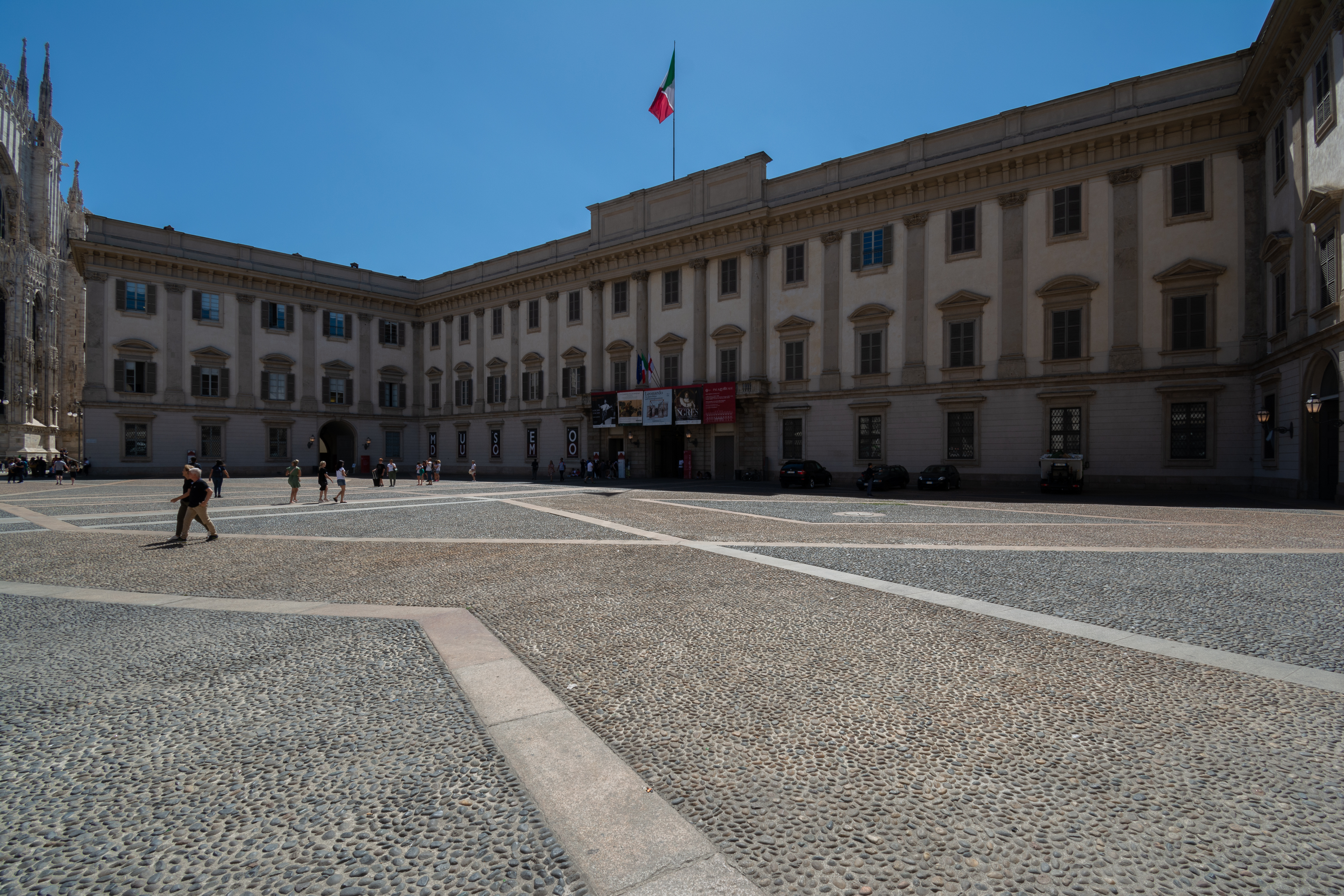
Royal Palace

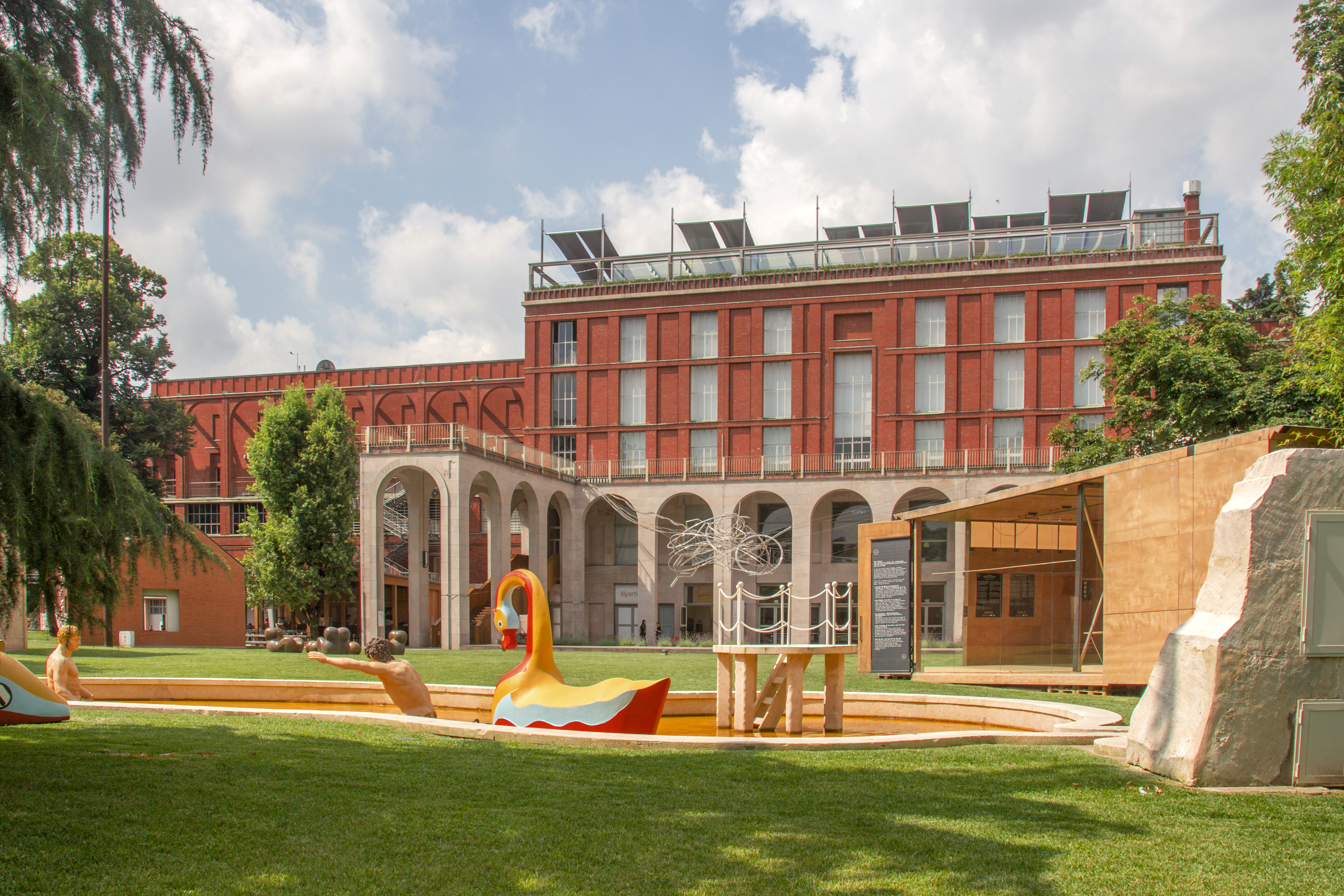
Triennale

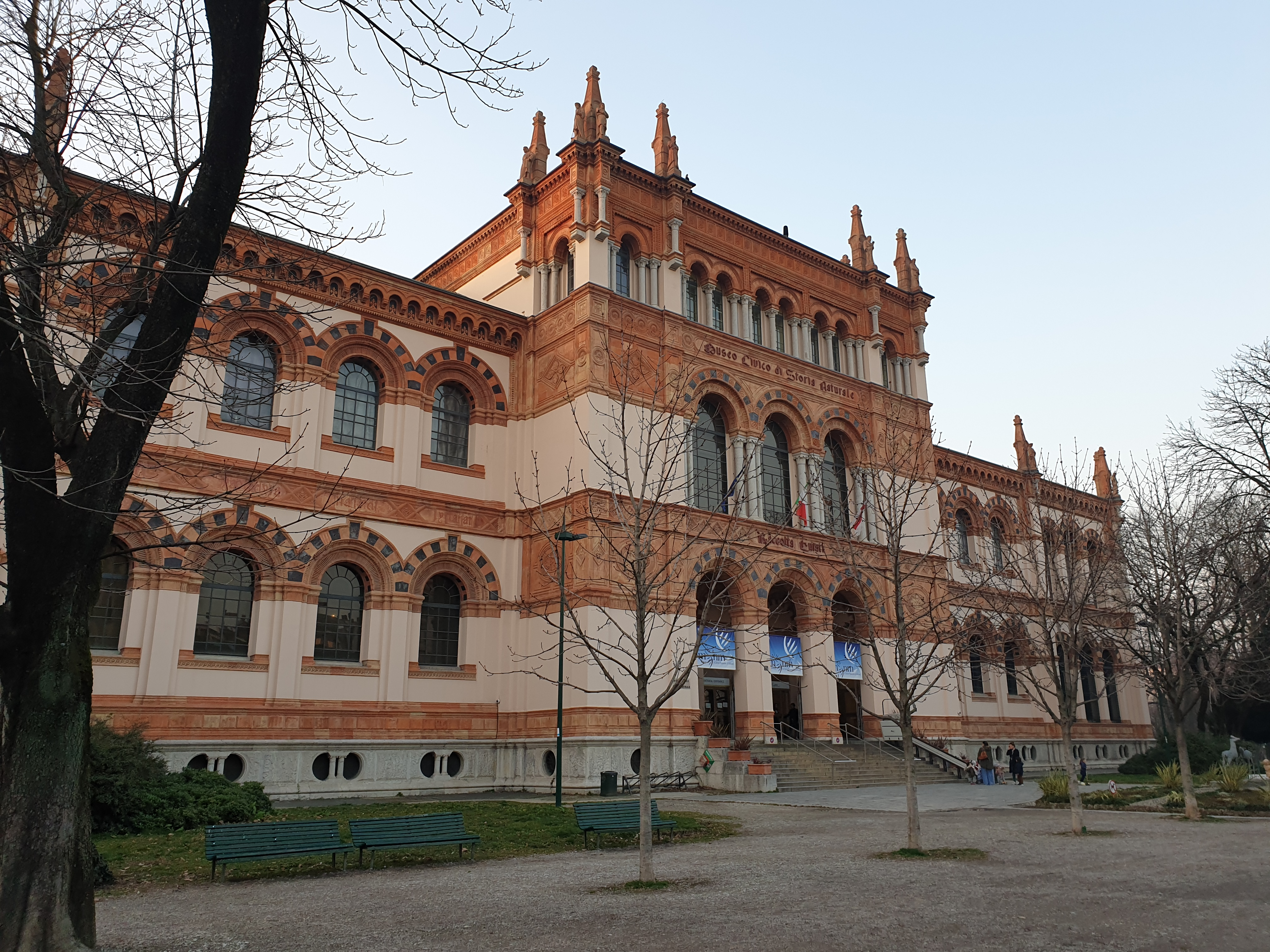
Natural History Museum

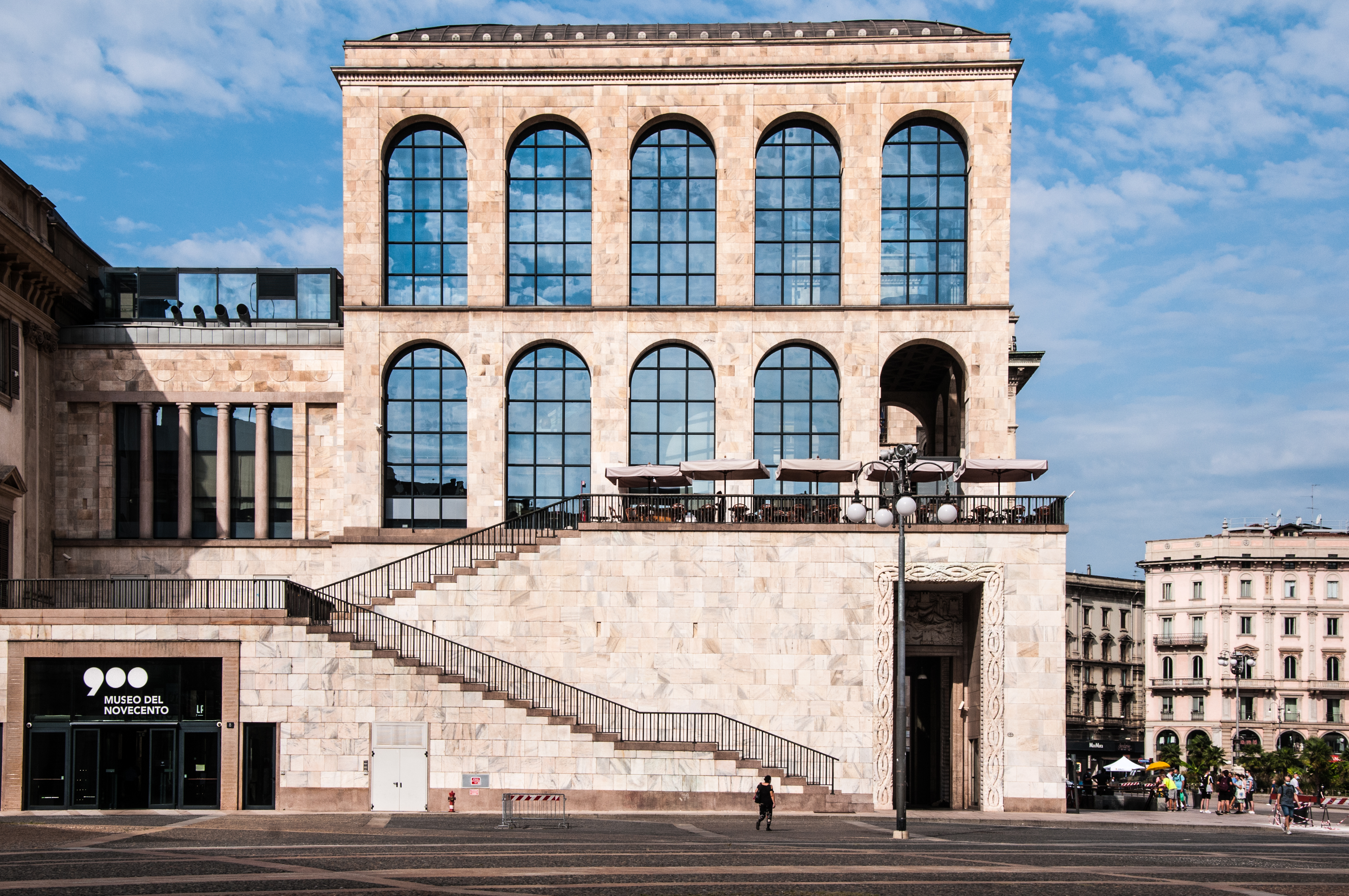
Museo del Novecento

== Transport ==
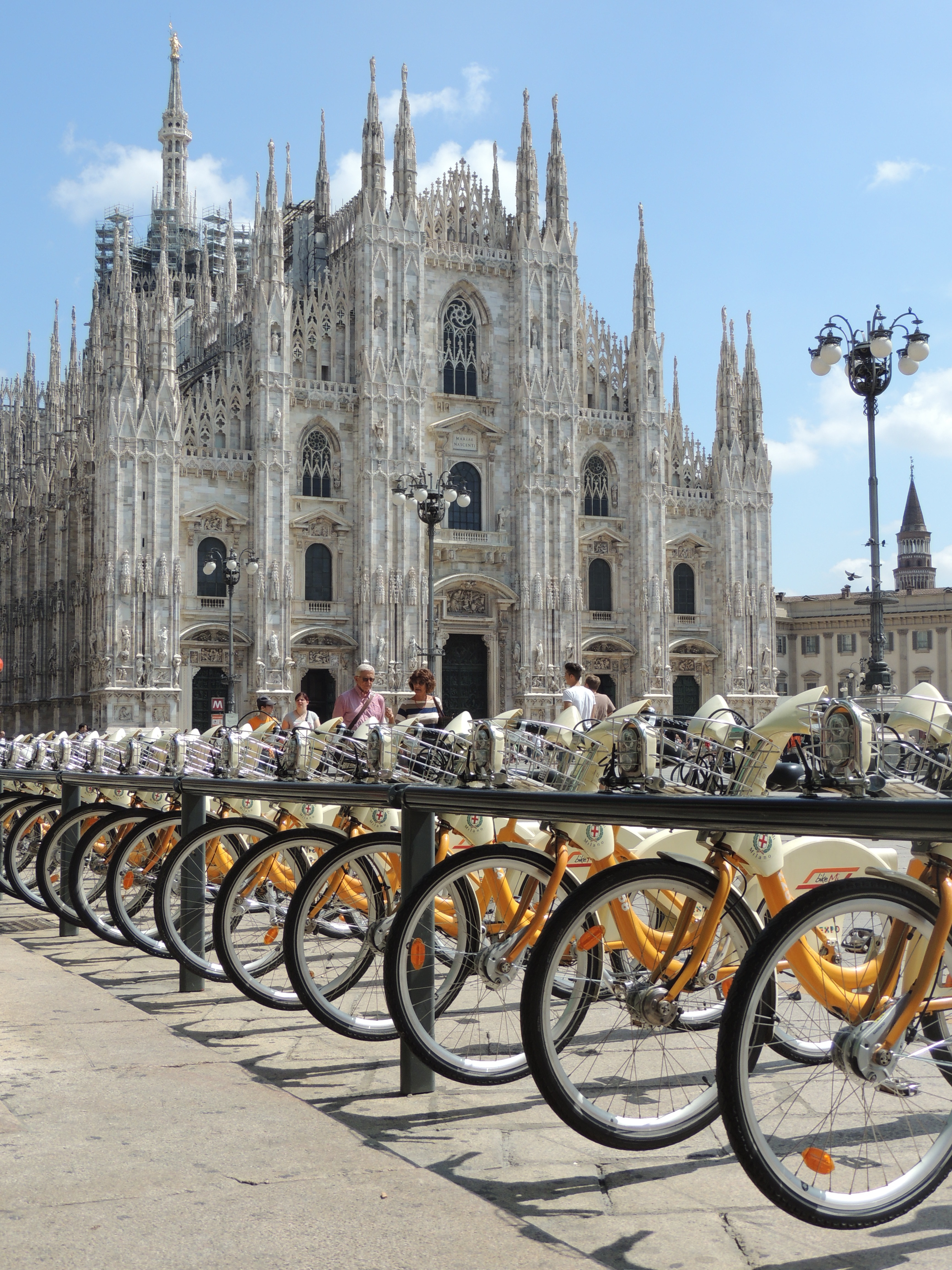
Bike sharing in Piazza Duomo

Stations of Milan Metro in Zone 1:

- Cadorna, Cairoli, Cordusio, Duomo, Palestro, Porta Venezia, San Babila;
- Cadorna, Lanza, Moscova, Sant’Ambrogio;
- Crocetta, Duomo, Missori, Montenapoleone, Porta Romana, Turati.
- De Amicis, San Babila, Sant'Ambrogio, Santa Sofia, Sforza-Policlinico, Tricolore, Vetra.

Suburban railway stations in the Zone 1:

- Milano Cadorna

Zone 1 is also interested by Milan Area C, a congestion charge introduced on 16 January 2012, replacing the previous pollution charge Ecopass and based on the same designated traffic restricted zone or ZTL (Italian: Zona a Traffico Limitato), corresponding to the central Cerchia dei Bastioni area. The ZTL encompasses about 8.2 km^{2} (3.2 sq mi) and 77,000 residents (4.5% and 6% of the city total, respectively). The area is accessible through 43 gates, monitored by video cameras. Area C started as an 18-month pilot program based on the partial implementation of the results of a referendum that took place in June 2011. The objective of the program was to drastically reduce the chronic traffic jams that take place in the city of Milan, to promote sustainable mobility and public transport, and to decrease the existing levels of smog that have become unsustainable from the point of view of public health. Area C was definitively approved as a permanent program on 27 March 2013.

Due to this traffic restrictions, the Zone is predominantly characterized by many pedestrian zones and easily accessible by bike.

== Other notable places ==
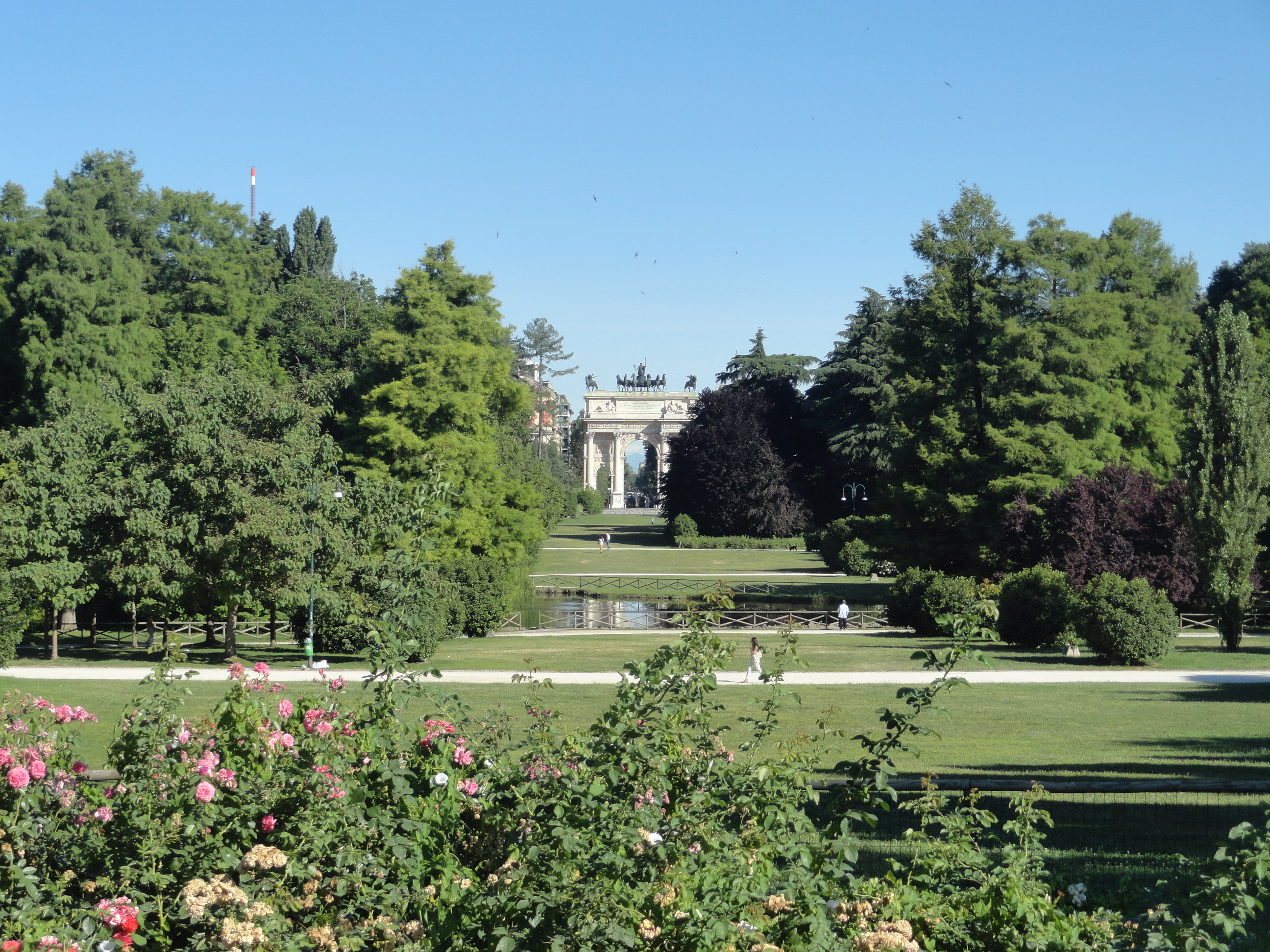
Sempione Park

- Duomo;
- La Scala opera house;
- Galleria del Corso;
- Galleria Vittorio Emanuele II, the world's oldest shopping mall;
- Palazzo Marino, Milan's city hall;
- Piccolo Teatro;
- Colonne di San Lorenzo and the two main Churches in the surroundings, Basilica di San Lorenzo Maggiore, Basilica di Sant'Eustorgio;
- Sempione Park;
- Indro Montanelli Public Gardens;
- Torre Velasca.

== Maps ==
Map of Zona 1

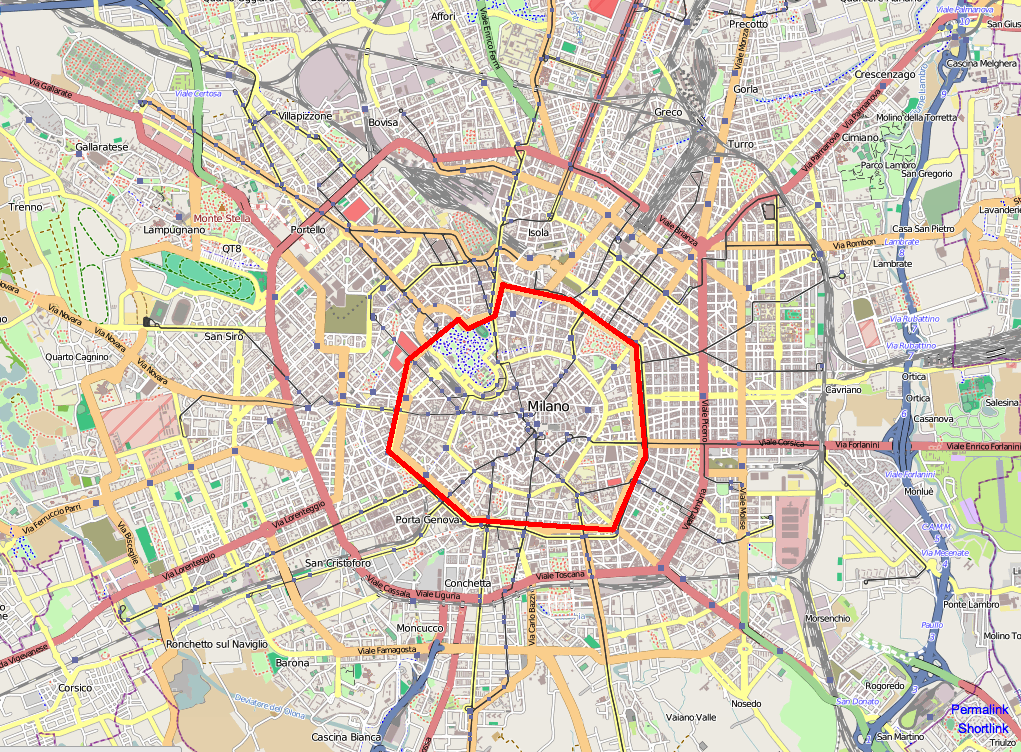
Area C traffic restricted zone (ZTL)
