= Stolpersteine in Milan =

Memorial installations in Italy

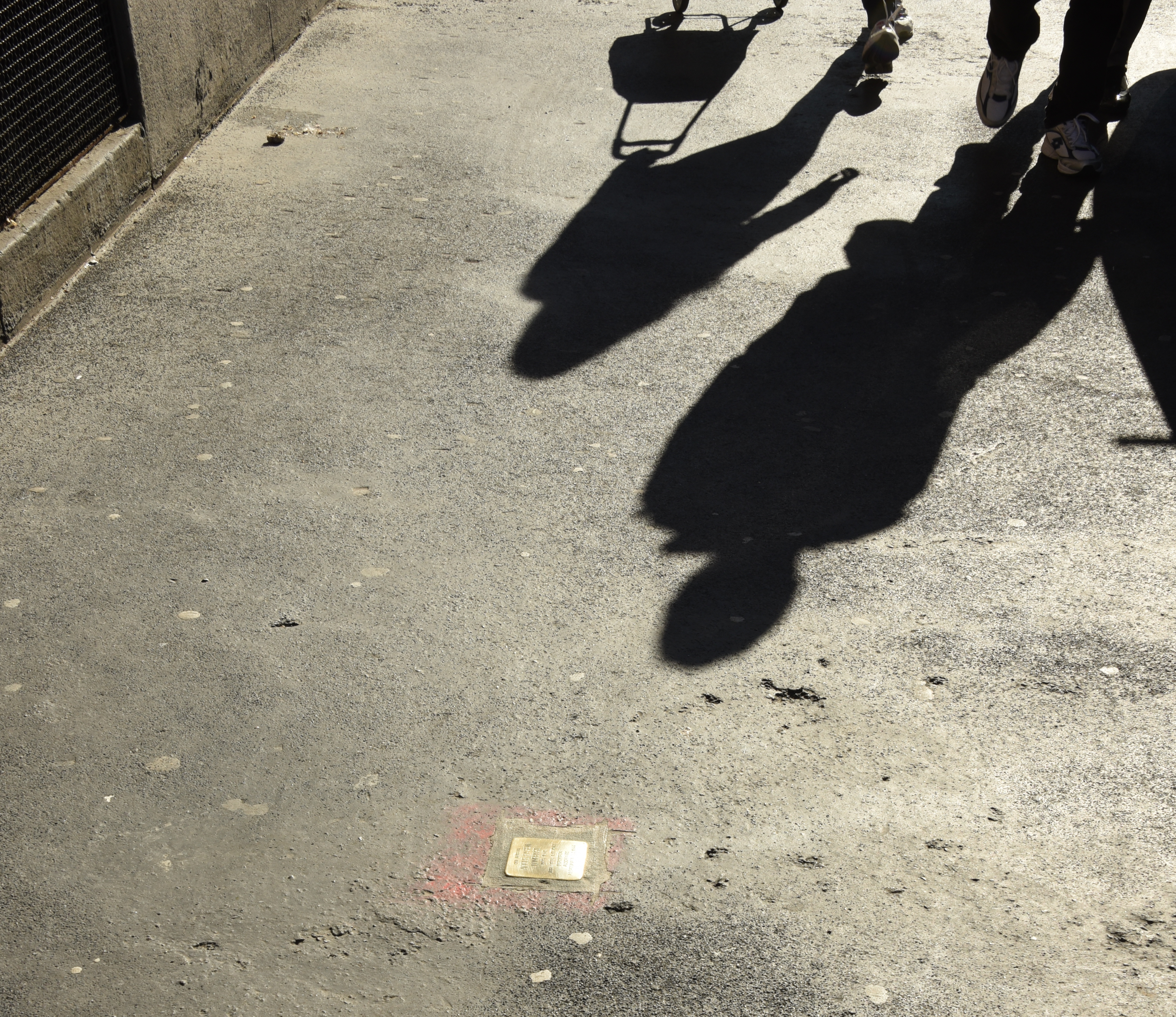
Stolperstein in Milan, 2017

Stolpersteine is the German name for small, cobblestone-sized memorials placed around Europe by the German artist Gunter Demnig. They commemorate the victims of Nazi Germany who were murdered, deported, exiled or driven to suicide. The first Stolpersteine in Milan, the capital of the Italian region of Lombardia, were established in January 2017.

Generally, the blocks are posed in front of the building where the victims had their last self-chosen residence. The name of the Stolpersteine in Italian is pietre d'inciampo.

== Milan ==
Stone	Inscription	Location	Life and death
	HERE LIVED; ANGELO AGLIERI; LOMBROSO; BORN 1914; ARRESTED 25.5.1944; DEPORTED; FLOSSENBÜRG; MURDERED 24.12.1944	Viale Monza, 23	Angelo Aglieri
	HERE WORKED; GIANLUIGI BANFI; BORN 1910; ARRESTED 21.3.1944; DEPORTED; MAUTHAUSEN; MURDERED 10.4.1945; GUSEN	Via dei Chiostri 2; 45.4741575°N 9.1863163°E	Gian Luigi Banfi, born on 2 April 1910 in Milan, was an architect. Together with colleagues Belgiojoso, Peressutti and Rogers, he founded the BBPR studio, which was also involved in urban planning, in interior design and in publishing the journal Quadrante. He promoted rationalist architecture in Italy and became an anti-fascist, he adhered to the clandestine Partito d'Azione and caught during Nazi occupation of northern Italy. His colleague Ernesto Nathan Rogers, of Jewish descent, had to flee to Switzerland. Banfi and his colleague Lodovico Barbiano di Belgiojoso were arrested on 21 March 1944 and deported first to Fossoli di Carpi, then to Bolzano and Mauthausen. He died in the Gusen subcamp on the eve of liberation, on 10 April 1945. Belgiojoso did survive.
	HERE LIVED; ADELE BASEVI; LOMBROSO; BORN 1868; ARRESTED 1.12.1943; DEPORTED; AUSCHWITZ; MURDERED 5.2.1944	Via Vespri Siciliani 71; 45.4507843°N 9.1434358°E	Adele Basevi Lombroso was born on 7 August 1866 in Brescia. She was the daughter of Alessandro Basevi and Silvia Finzi. She married Gerolamo Lombroso. The couple had a daughter, Renata. After the German occupation of Northern Italy in September 1943, Italian citizens who betrayed Jews to the SS were promised to get their apartment. The elderly lady was arrested by Nazi troops on 1 December 1943. She was deported with the convoy #6 to Auschwitz concentration camp on 30 January 1944 and arrived there on 6 February 1944. She was murdered on the day of her arrival in a gas chamber. Her daughter was able to survive because she was warned and hid by the porter after returning from work.
	HERE LIVED; GIUSEPPE BERNA; BORN 1903; ARRESTED 11.3.1944; DEPORTED; MAUTHAUSEN; DIED 10.5.1945	Via privata Hermada, 4	Giuseppe Berna
	HERE LIVED; MARGHERITA; LUZZATTO BÖHM; BORN 1878; ARRESTED 13.12.1943; DEPORTED; AUSCHWITZ; MURDERED 26.2.1944	Via De Amicis, 45	Margherita Luzzatto Böhm
	HERE LIVED; MICHELANGELO; BÖHM; BORN 1867; ARRESTED 13.12.1943; DEPORTED; AUSCHWITZ; MURDERED 6.2.1944	Via De Amicis, 45	Michelangelo Böhm
	HERE LIVED; EMMA BOVI; BORN 1888; ARRESTED 15.3.1944; DEPORTED; RAVENSBRÜCK; MURDERED 25.3.1945; FÜRSTENBERG	Via Bezzecca, 1	Emma Bovi
	HERE LIVED; ENZO CAPITANO; BORN 1927; ARRESTED 22.12.1944; DEPORTED; MAUTHAUSEN; DIED 9.5.1945	Via Stradella, 13	Enzo Capitano
	HERE LIVED; DANTE COEN; BORN 1910; ARRESTED 26.7.1944; DEPORTED; AUSCHWITZ; MURDERED 4.4.1945; BUCHENWALD	Via Plinio 20; 45.4783235°N 9.2139647°E	Dante Coen was born on 24 August 1910 in Ancona. He was the son of Arrigo Coen and Ilde Portaleone. He had ten brothers (Aldo, Attilio, Brenno, Bruno, Enzo, Franco, Manfred, Nello, Remo and Umberto) and four sisters (Dina, Floretta, Lina and Romilda). He married Angelina Giustacchini. The couple had a daughter, Ornella. He was arrested by Nazi authorities on 26 July 1944, and deported with convoy # 14 on 2 August 1944 to Auschwitz and arrived there on 6 August 1944. His prison number was 190841, tattooed on his skin. He was murdered, presumably after a death march, in Buchenwald concentration camp on 4 April 1945. At least two of his siblings, Romilde and Umberto, were also victims of the Shoah.
	HERE LIVED; ETTA DE BENEDETTI; REINACH; BORN 1904; ARRESTED NOV. 1943; DEPORTED; AUSCHWITZ; MURDERED	Via De Togni, 10	Maria Antonietta Reinach De Benedetti
	HERE LIVED; PIERO DE BENEDETTI; BORN 1929; ARRESTED NOV. 1943; DEPORTED; AUSCHWITZ; MURDERED	Via De Togni, 10	Piero De Benedetti
	HERE LIVED; UGO DE BENEDETTI; BORN 1893; ARRESTED NOV. 1943; DEPORTED; AUSCHWITZ; MURDERED	Via De Togni, 10	Ugo De Benedetti
	HERE LIVED; ANTONIO DE GIORGI; BORN 1904; DEPORTED; MAUTHAUSEN; MURDERED 20.3.1945; GUSEN	Via Borgonuovo, 5	Antonio De Giorgi
	HERE LIVED; MELCHIORRE; DE GIULI; BORN 1906; ARRESTED 7.8.1944; DEPORTED; DACHAU; MURDERED 24.2.1945; ÜBERLINGEN	Via Milazzo 4; 45.47907°N 9.18753°E	Melchiorre De Giuli was born on 7 February 1906 in Motta Visconti in the province of Milan. His parents were Costante De Giuli and Maria Caserio. At a young age he was a follower of the Fascists, but turned away from them in the 1930s. He became an overt opponent of Mussolini and his regime. He joined the resistance movement Giustizia e Libertà and was interned from 1934 to 1938 as a political prisoner on the island of Ponza. After the armistice of Cassibile and the subsequent invasion of the Germans in northern Italy, he joined the Lombard Azione Patriottica, small clandestine resistance groups founded by the Communist Party of Italy. He was arrested in Milan on 7 August 1944 by the Nazis and deported first to Bolzano, later to Dachau concentration camp. De Giuli came to a sub-camp established at the outskirts of Überlingen, in Aufkirch, where 700 prisoners were deployed in the construction of an extensive underground facility, the Goldbach Stollen for the manufacture of military armaments. There he was murdered on 24 February 1945.
	HERE LIVED; CESARE FANO; BORN 1868; ARRESTED 18.12.1943; DEPORTED; AUSCHWITZ; MURDERED 6.2.1944	Via Corridoni, 1	Cesare Fano was born on 13 June 1868 in Colorno (PR), son of Abramo Fano and Corinna Rimini. In 1904 he married Silvia Usigli born on September 2, 1879, in Rovigo, daughter of Giacomo and Carolina Usigli. They had a son, Paolo, and they live in Milan, in Via Corridoni #1. Cesare worked in a bank and Silvia was a housewife. The family had a peaceful life. They did not realize the consequences of the racial laws of 1938 and remained at home even after September 8, 1943, day of the German occupation. Their advanced age would have saved them. When they tried to escape to Switzerland at the end of December 1943, it was too late. They were captured on 18 December 1943 in Tirano, they were detained first in the Sondrio prison and then in Milan, in San Vittore. They were deported on transport 6 which departed from platform 21 in Milan on 30 January 1944 and arrived in Auschwitz on 6 February 1944. They did not go through the selection on arrival and were immediately sent to the gas chambers.
	HERE LIVED; SILVIA USIGLI FANO; BORN 1879; ARRESTED 18.12.1943; DEPORTED; AUSCHWITZ; MURDERED 6.2.1944	Via Corridoni, 1	Silvia Usigli Fano
	HERE LIVED; WILLIAM FINZI; BORN 1900; ARRESTED 10.5.1944; DEPORTED; AUSCHWITZ; MURDERED 7.2.1945; MAUTHAUSEN	Via Conca del Naviglio, 7	William Finzi
	HERE LIVED; ANGELO FIOCCHI; BORN 1911; ARRESTED 2.3.1944; DEPORTED; MAUTHAUSEN; MURDERED 7.4.1945; EBENSEE	Viale Lombardia, 65	Angelo Fiocchi
	HERE LIVED; RAFFAELE GILARDINO; BORN 1917; ARRESTED 2.8.1944; DEPORTED; DACHAU; BUCHENWALD; MURDERED 1.2.1945	Viale Piceno, 33	Raffaele Gilardino
	HERE LIVED; GIUSEPPE LENZI; BORN 1880; ARRESTED 15.3.1944; DEPORTED; MAUTHAUSEN; MURDERED 21.11.1944; GUSEN	Via Spontini 8; 45°28′54″N 9°12′50″E	Giuseppe Lenzi was born on 23 December 1880 in Palaia in the province of Pisa. He was married to Sestilia Antonelli. Lenzi was an anti-fascist. After the armistice of Cassibile and the subsequent take-over of power by the Nazi regime in northern Italy, he joined the Partito d'Azione (Pd'A), a political party founded in 1942 in the underground to fight against fascism. He became a close associate of Ferruccio Parri, a leading representative of the Pd'A, a partisan chief and later Prime Minister of Italy. Following a denunciation, he was arrested by Nazi forces on 15 March or 15 August 1944. He was first deported to Fossoli transit camp, thereafter to the Mauthausen concentration camp and murdered on 21 November 1944 in one of its sub-camps, in Gusen. On 20 May 1946, Lenzi was officially recognized as partisan and voluntary freedom fighter for Lombardy in the years 1943 and 1944.
	HERE LIVED; ROMEO LOCATELLI; BORN 1897; ARRESTED 20.11.1944; DEPORTED; MAUTHAUSEN; MURDERED 9.4.1945; GUSEN	Viale Emilio Caldara, 11	Romeo Locatelli
	HERE LIVED; GIUSEPPE MALAGODI; BORN 1894; ARRESTED 10.12.1943; DEPORTED; MAUTHAUSEN; MURDERED 29.3.1945; GUSEN	Via Marcona, 34	Giuseppe Malagodi
	HERE LIVED; ALESSANDRO MONETA; BORN 1883; ARRESTED 4.11.1944; DEPORTED; MAUTHAUSEN; MURDERED 20.1.1945; GUSEN	Piazzale Cadorna, 15	Alessandro Moneta
	HERE LIVED; GIUSEPPE PAGANO; BORN 1896; ARRESTED 5.9.1944; DEPORTED; MAUTHAUSEN; MURDERED 22.4.1945; MELK	Via Sarfatti, 25 (in front of Bocconi University)	Giuseppe Pagano Pogatschnig, architect
	HERE LIVED; LIVIA SINIGALLIA; PIPERNO; BORN 1906; ARRESTED 15.12.1943; DEPORTED; AUSCHWITZ; MURDERED 30.12.1944; DACHAU	Via Bizzoni, 7	Livia Sinigallia Piperno
	HERE LIVED; ODORICO PIPERNO; BORN 1901; ARRESTED 15.12.1943; DEPORTED; AUSCHWITZ; MURDERED	Via Bizzoni, 7	Odorico Piperno
	HERE LIVED; RAMBALDO PIPERNO; BORN 1930; ARRESTED 15.12.1943; DEPORTED; AUSCHWITZ; MURDERED	Via Bizzoni, 7	Rambaldo Piperno
	HERE LIVED; RENZO PIPERNO; BORN 1932; ARRESTED 15.12.1943; DEPORTED; AUSCHWITZ; MURDERED 6.2.1944	Via Bizzoni, 7	Renzo Piperno
	HERE LIVED; OTTO POPPER; BORN 1915; ARRESTED 24.1.1944; DEPORTED; MAUTHAUSEN; MURDERED 25.10.1944; LINZ	Via Mengoni, 2	Otto Michael Popper
	HERE LIVED; ERNESTO REINACH; BORN 1855; ARRESTED NOV. 1943; DEPORTED; AUSCHWITZ; MURDERED 7.12.1943; DURING TRANSPORT	Via De Togni, 10	Ernesto Reinach
	HERE LIVED; ALBERTO SEGRE; BORN 1899; ARRESTED 8.12.1943; DEPORTED; AUSCHWITZ; MURDERED 27.4.1944	Corso Magenta 55; 45°27′56″N 9°10′25″E	Alberto Segre was born on 12 December 1899 in Milan. Son of Giuseppe Segre and Olga Loevvy. He had to take part in the last phase of World War I but graduated from Liceo Manzoni in July 1918. Graduated in Economics and Commerce, worked for the family firm. He was anti-fascist. Married Lucia Foligno. On 10 September 1930, their only daughter was born, Liliana. A few months later his wife died. When the persecution of Italian Jews intensified, Segre hid his daughter with friends by using fake documents. In December 1943, an attempt to flee to Switzerland failed. Father and daughter were arrested the following day in Selvetta di Viggiù in the Province of Varese. They were transferred to the prison in Varese, then to Como and finally to Milan. On 30 January 1944, Segre and his daughter were deported to Auschwitz-Birkenau concentration camp, which they reached seven days later. The daughter was immediately separated from her father, who was killed in Auschwitz on 27 April 1944. On 18 May 1944, his parents were arrested in Inverigo. They were also deported to Auschwitz and murdered on arrival on June 30. His daughter was a forced laborer at an ammunition factory for about a year and underwent three more selections. She survived a death march to Germany and was liberated on 1 May 1945. Returning to Italy, she married Alfredo Belli Paci in 1948, who was also a concentration camps survivor. The couple had three children. In the 1990s she became one of the most important Italian witnesses of the Holocaust. In 2004, she obtained the Order of Merit of the Italian Republic.
	HERE LIVED; AUGUSTO SILLA; FABBRI; BORN 1905; ARRESTED 11.3.1944; DEPORTED; MAUTHAUSEN; DIED 10.5.1945; GUSEN	Via dei Cinquecento, 20	Augusto Silla Fabbri was born on 28 September 1905 a Copparo. He was a mechanic at Caproni, an important an Italian aircraft manufacturer founded in 1908. He was married to Luigia Riazzoli. The couple lived in Via dei Cinquecento 20. He was opposed to fascism and was active in clandestine resistance work. In early March 1944 he participated in the Italian general strike against the Nazi regime and organized the resistance inside Caproni who blocked all activities for eight days. He was arrested and thereafter deported to Mauthausen concentration camp. He arrived there on 20 March 1944. His inmate number was 58847. In April he was transferred to one of the Gusen camps, later-on he was kept in custody in Floridsdorf, a district of Vienna. It is unknown why he was deported to Auschwitz concentration camp in December 1944. Only few weeks later the evacuation of Auschwitz began and he was sent beck to Mauthausen where he was registered with the number 118709. In the middle of February 1945 he was again transferred to Gusen and again exploited in forced labour. He died of hunger and pain on 10 May 1945, when the Nazi regime had already ceased to exist.

== Collocation dates ==
The Stolpersteine of Milan were all collocated by Gunter Demnig personally at the following dates.

- 19 January 2017: Corso Magenta, 55; Via dei Chiostri, 2; Via Gaspare Spontini, 8; Via Milazzo, 4; Via Plinio, 20; Via Vespri Siciliani, 71
- 19 January 2018: Via Bezzecca, 1; Viale Caldara, 11; Via dei Cinquecento, 20; Via privata Hermada, 4; Via Marcona, 34; Via Sarfatti, 25; Viale Monza, 23; Viale Piceno, 33
- 20 January 2018: Piazzale Cadorna, 15; Via Borgonuovo, 5; Via Mengoni, 2; Via Stradella 13; Viale Lombardia, 65
- 23 January 2018: Via Bizzoni, 7; via Conca del Naviglio, 7; via Corridoni, 1; via De Amicis, 45; via De Togni, 10

== See also ==
- List of places with Stolpersteine
- Stolpersteine in Italy
