= Jack Bertoli =

Indian architect (born 1931)

Jack Vicajee Bertoli
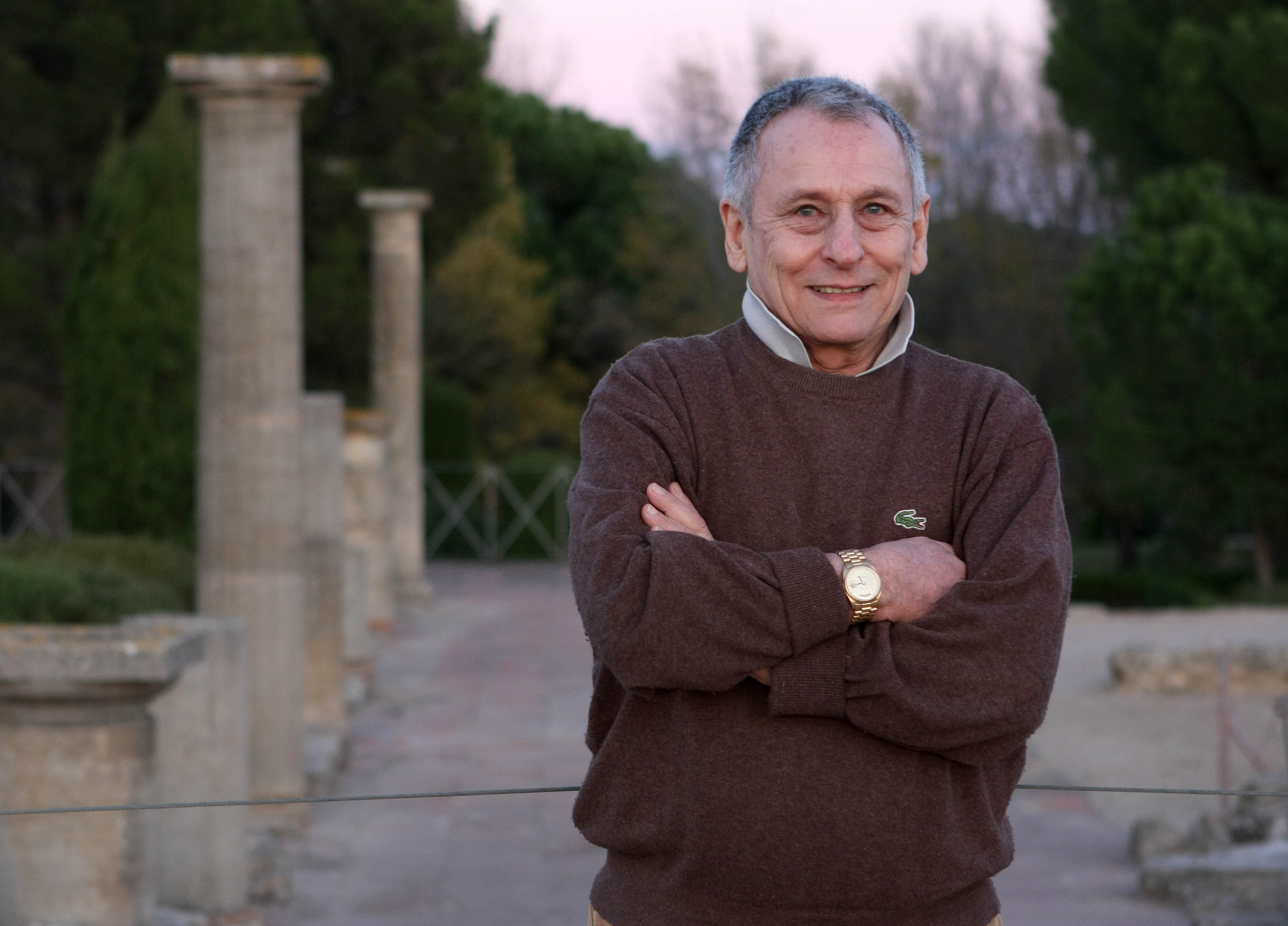
- Born: 6 October 1931 (age 95); Bombay, British India
- Education: Saint Mary's High School, Bombay; Campion School, Bombay; International School of Geneva; University of Geneva, Switzerland; Princeton University, USA
- Occupations: Architect & planner
- Relatives: Nephew of: Mr. & Mrs. (Vicajee) J.R.D. Tata

Jack Vicajee Bertoli (born 6 October 1931) is an Indian-born naturalised Swiss planner and architect, based in Geneva, Switzerland, and Spain. He was born to an Italian father, Fausto Piscionieri, an interior designer and architect practising in India in the early 1930s, and a Parsi (Zoroastrian) mother, Kathleen "Kitty" Vicajee. His mother's family is one of the oldest Parsi families, who were closely attached as bankers to Nizam of Hyderabad.

== Biography ==
When Bertoli was a child his mother divorced his father and went to live with her sister, Thelma "Vicajee" Tata, and her husband J.R.D. Tata, a prominent industrialist, visionary, philanthropist, and planner who obtained a Bharat Ratna, the highest civil award in India.

During the Second World War, Kitty became a voluntary nurse for wounded soldiers and sailors, and later remarried an Italian naval officer, Giovanni Bertoli, one of the first pilots in the Italian Navy before Aircraft carriers, with catapulted planes. He was shot down by the RAF in the African Campaign near Tripoli in 1942, taken prisoner, and put in charge of the Italian Prisoner of War Camps in India. His knowledge and enthusiasm for aircraft led to a close friendship with J.R.D. Tata, who was the first Indian ever to obtain a flying licence, Indian Licence Number 1., on 10 February 1929. In 1930, he participated in the Aga Khan Prize to be the first Indian to attempt to fly solo from England to India. In 1932, he flew the first air link for the Indian Airmail service from Karachi to Bombay in a De Havilland Gypsy Moth, and established Tata Airlines, which later became Air-India. After the war, Giovanni Bertoli retired from the Italian Navy with the rank of Rear-Admiral and joined Air-India as the District Manager for Continental Europe, based in Geneva, Switzerland. On 24 January 1966, while returning from Mumbai with his friend Dr. Homi Bhabha, a physicist and director of the Indian Atomic Energy Commission, their Air-India Boeing 707 plane crashed into Mont Blanc only a few minutes before landing in Geneva, killing all 117 passengers and crew.

=== Personal and family life ===
While living with Thelly and Jeh, before the partition of India, and after independence, Bertoli had the chance to meet with many Indian, and world political leaders and world dignitaries, who were often invited to J.R.D. Tata's private receptions, held in their house in Bombay, called "The Cairn". Among these were Jawaharlal Nehru, his daughter Indira Gandhi, who was a close friend of Bertoli's mother; Krishna Hutheesing (Nehru's sister), V.K. Krishna Menon, described as the second most powerful man in India; Muhammad Ali Jinnah, the founder of the Muslim State of Pakistan (East and West Pakistan), Willy Messerschmitt, the designer of the World War II German fighter plane, and the small, inexpensive, three-wheeled KR200 car; and also several ambassadors and world political leaders.

Bertoli, on his birthday, was introduced to Mahatma Gandhi (Mohandas Karamchand Gandhi), the "Father of the Indian Nation", who had celebrated his birthday two days earlier. Gandhi was living next to J.R.D. Tata's holiday home on the Beach of Juhu, near Bombay, and was on a fasting and non-speaking period of civil disobedience in his non-violent fight for the independence of the country. He wrote a short poem for Bertoli, urging him to try and follow the best road of life, in the simplest yet most dynamic way. This meeting with Gandhi, together with the personal teachings and philosophy he received from J.R.D. Tata, encouraged Bertoli to pursue planning for the betterment of life for the less fortunate masses and population of India.

=== Education and schooling ===
Bertoli was taught by Spanish Jesuit priests in India, at St. Mary's High School and the Campion School in Bombay, and later at the International School of Geneva, Switzerland. His step-father, Giovanni Bertoli, contacted the Dean of the University of Geneva, and enrolled him in the university to study architecture, without his school certificate. Bertoli obtained his diploma, a Masters in Architecture, from the University of Geneva in the shortest time ever, a record that still stands today. He studied under the guidance of Eugène Beaudouin, a French Grand Prix de Rome architect who designed and built the Tour Montparnasse in Paris. Bertoli, with several fellowships offered to him from the United States, attended Princeton University, USA, where he obtained a second Masters of Fine Arts in Planning, and was later offered an Instructorship in Architecture by Princeton University.

At Princeton he studied and worked with several professors and visiting professors, including Robert W. McLaughlin, Jean Labatut, and Enrico Peressutti, the designer of the Torre Velasca in Milan, and partner of the Italian Architectural Group BBPR; Buckminster Fuller, known for his Geodisic Domes, Louis Kahn, and Paul Lester Wiener, an architect and urban planner, who was a collaborator of Le Corbusier on the team to undertake the Master Plan of Bogota and Brasilia. After his studies in the US, Bertoli obtained several job offers and worked for assignments on international projects for Marcel Breuer and Eero Saarinen, as well as joining the team of R.B. O'Connor and W.H. Kilham Jr. to design the new American Embassy in Kabul, Afghanistan.

== Architectural practice ==
=== India ===
In 1960, Bertoli returned to India from the US, to join the Ford Foundation in New Delhi as a consultant for the development of the Delhi Master Plan. He undertook planning and research and a study with the architect Le Corbusier in Chandigarh, who was designing the new city capital of the Punjab. His research, work, and designs were oriented towards the planning for the improvement of the habitat for the masses, particularly in the urban and rural population, with possibilities to better the urban slum population of India. His designs incorporated methods of construction for economic housing for the poor, that would use simple but lasting cheap materials, such as pre-stressed bamboo beams, straw and mud constructions. Inhabitants would be provided with self-help classes teaching how to build and plan their own houses as optimum units in economic groups, that could be easily expanded upon and enlarged as families increased in size. Several of these buildings were built, and details were published in Indian newspapers and magazines.

Bertoli continued his research and studies towards the practical design of grouped-housing-units for the poor, for optimum economical structures with different Indian village concept layout schemes. This included the protection of nature, the protection of the site with the best orientation for energy-efficiency, and the best choice of local materials. Respect for the local culture, tradition, the different religions, and habits of the villagers would be prioritised. Special design features would give and include for all the inhabitants in these planned areas, important and essential interior elements for a better standard of living. Every home unit would have the necessary basics with all the essential elements for better living conditions, e.g. interior-privacy, light interior partitions, cooking-corners, a running-water tap, individual lavatories with a washing space, used-water evacuation, and a small private-patio garden.

Bertoli obtained the mandate to design the New Township of Trombay for the Indian Atomic Energy Commission. Technical problems concerning this project held it up indefinitely, although Bertoli was offered several large private mandates from important Indian promoters and contractors. However, with the continued requests to be introduced to J.R.D. Tata, Bertoli realised that corruption and nepotism were thriving in the country, and that architectural mandates were being handed out, not in the interests of the project, but with specific interests and requests only to be introduced to J.R.D. Tata. Bertoli subsequently returned to Geneva, with the proposition from Switzerland to become a Swiss citizen, and open his private practice, with a return air ticket to India that he kept as a souvenir.

=== International projects ===
Bertoli opened an office in Geneva, that incorporated twenty-one architects and a design staff. Some of his projects and designs were built in India, Switzerland, France, Italy, Africa, the United States of America, and the Caribbean, and can be seen on his website.

=== Present projects ===
Bertoli's present work revisits his earlier research for proposals and solutions for the housing of the growing population problem of India. His work involves plans to establish a strong future philosophy for the planning of construction in India, together with the participation of Indian planners, politicians, and industrialists, including a few of the New Indian multibillionaires.

== Articles and publications ==
- "Problème du Logement Economic dans l'Inde", Tribune de Genève, 7 April 1956
- "Towards City Planning and Architecture for New Needs", Design Magazine of the Arts, India, February 1959
- "An Economic House for a Large Family", Design Magazine of the Arts India, March 1959
- "Very Economic Houses for Indian Villages", The Hindustan Times Weekly, 21 August 1960
- "De l'Alphabet de Jack Bertoli", La Galerie Club Migros, Le Dauphine Libere 1 February 1962
- "Au rendez–vous de l'insolite avec Jack Bertoli. Un peintre Indien étonne et seduit", Tribune de Geneve, 1962
- "Exposition de Travaux d'Anciens", L'Ecole Internationale, 25–30 June 1966
- "Emule de Le Corbusier, Jack Vicajee Bertoli", Le Dauphine Libere, 24 January 1967
- "Nelly Roch-Bertoli Réhabilite le Vitrail comme élément de décoration interieur", 10 February 1967
- "Jack Vicajee Bertoli", 30 Jours, 11 November 1967
- "La Construction du Centre de Recherches Médicales", Tribune de Genève, 11 January 1970
- "Chalets Americains dans la Region de Saint-Cergues", Tribune de Genève, April 1970
- "Résidence Hors-Série, Famille Oser", La Suisse, 11 August 1971.
- "La Cour du Cygne", La Suisse, 2 October 1972
- "À côté de l'Hôpital: Maison Fleur unique en Suisse", Tribune de Genève, 3 March 1972
- "A 36 ans, un des meilleurs Architectes-Urbanistes du moment", Tribune de Genève, 8 March 1972
- "Fondation Genevoise ultra-moderne pour les Recherches Médicales", Tribune de Genève, 28 June 1972
- "Centre de Recherches", Journal de la Construction Suisse Romande, 15 May 1987
- "l'Exploitation de la Nouvelle Aerogare", "Le Batiment de la Sécurité Arienne", and "Le Centrale Thermique", Tribune de Genève, 15 March 1997
- "Aux Paquis le 'Novotel' fait sa rénovation", Tribune de Genève, 10 April 2001
- "Un Voyage dans la Vie", and "The History of our Foundation", La Tulipe, 2000
- "India vera como disminye su Turismo", La Vanguardia, Madrid, 4 December 2008
- "Ode to 'La Tulipe' building – Place Makings", Slab Magazine 20 September 2010
- "XXe – Un Siècle d'Architecture a Genève", Publication de la Patrimoine Suisse, Geneva, 2009
- "La Tulipe", Maïlis Favre, University of Geneva special study, Spring, 2011
