= Colombini =

Colombini is an Italian family name. It may refer to:

- Aldo Colombini, Italian-born American magician
- Gino Colombini (1915–2011), Italian architect and industrial designer
- Giovanni Colombini
  - Giovanni Colombini (Founder of the Congregation of Jesuati) (c. 1300–1367), Italian merchant, the founder of the Congregation of Jesuati
  - Giovanni Colombini (painter) (c. 1700–1774), Italian painter
- Giulia Molino Colombini (1812–1879), Italian poet and educator
- Ignacio Colombini (born 1992), Argentine professional footballer
- Ugo Colombini (born 1967), former Italian professional tennis player and sports agent

== Astronomy ==
- 7030 Colombini, main-belt asteroid discovered on December 18, 1993, by Vagnozzi, A. at Stroncone
