= Torre Velasca =

- Torre Velasca seen from the roof of Duomo

General information
- Status: Completed
- Location: Milan, Italy
- Coordinates: 45°27′36″N 9°11′26″E
- Construction started: 1956
- Completed: 1958

Height
- Antenna spire: 98 m (322 ft)
- Top floor: 75 m (246 ft)

Technical details
- Floor count: 26

Design and construction
- Architect: BBPR
- Main contractor: Società Generale Immobiliare

The Torre Velasca ("Velasca Tower") is a skyscraper built in the 1950s by the BBPR architectural partnership, in Milan, Italy. The construction was achieved in 1958, and inaugurated in 1961. Measuring 106 metres (348 ft) in height to the roof, the tower has 26 stories. The building is considered one of the few Italian examples of post-rationalist brutalist architecture.

The tower is located in the city centre of Milan, near the Duomo (Milan Cathedral) and the headquarters of the University of Milan, between the streets corso di Porta Romana and via Larga. One of the exits of the Missori metro station, on line 3, is located right in front of it.

In 2011, the tower was placed under protection as a historic building.

== Description ==
The Torre Velasca is known for its peculiar and characteristic mushroom-like shape that stands out in the city skyline. Its structure recalls the Lombard tradition, made of medieval fortresses and towers, each having a massive profile. In such fortresses, the lower parts were always narrower, while the higher parts were propped up by wood or stone beams. As a consequence, the shape of this building is the result of a modern interpretation of the typical medieval Italian castle. At the same time, BBPR in this building satisfied the functional needs of space: narrower surfaces on the ground, wider and more spacious ones on the top floors. The town planning laws, then, imposed specific volumes (depending on the buildings' purpose); in this tower, the latter were the mixed functions of residential and commercial use.

== History ==
In 1949, the Municipality of Milan granted Ri.C.E. (Ricostruzione Comparti Edilizi) a permit to construct "a multi-storey mixed-use building for commercial and residential purposes" on a redeveloped public land site devastated by heavy Anglo-American bombing during World War II.

Led by BBPR (Gian Luigi Banfi, Lodovico Barbiano di Belgiojoso, Enrico Peressutti, Ernesto Nathan Rogers), the tower's design studies started in 1950, in collaboration with the Turin-based engineer Arturo Danusso. Immediately directed towards creating a new symbol of Milan's post-war dynamism, the envisioned project was a skyscraper entirely built in steel and glass. Due to the high cost of the material and the national production capacity of the time, this initial proposal was abandoned; BBPR instead opted for a reinforced concrete structure with stone cladding. This solution reduced costs by the quarter and was better suited for the city's architectural context.

Between 1952 and 1955, the building's final design was completed and approved by the client. The tower was executed between 1956 and 1957. Construction lasted 292 days, concluding eight days ahead of schedule.

== Reception and criticism ==
Upon its completion in 1958, Torre Velasca generated significant controversy among architectural critics and the Milanese public. Departing sharply from the glass-and-steel orthodoxies of the contemporary International Style, the building sought to contextualize modern architecture within Milan's historic urban fabric. Its cantilevered upper section supported by exposed diagonal trusses drew deliberate inspiration from late-medieval Lombard fortresses and the Filarete Tower of the Castello Sforzesco.

International modernists were largely critical of this historicist approach. In an April 1959 article titled "Neoliberty: The Italian Retreat from Modern Architecture" in The Architectural Review, British architectural historian Reyner Banham criticized the building and the broader Neo-Liberty movement, characterizing its regional historicism as a regressive departure from modern functionalism. Conversely, the Italian architectural community recognized its contextual dialogue; in 1961, BBPR received the Regional Award for Lombardy from the National Institute of Architecture (IN/ARCH) for the design.

Among the Milanese public, the tower's heavy concrete silhouette and overhang earned it the popular nickname "il grattacielo con le bretelle" ("the skyscraper with braces"). While occasionally polarized as either an imposing eyesore or a visionary civic symbol, the tower's cultural and architectural standing grew over subsequent decades. In 2011, Italy's Ministry of Cultural Heritage, through the local Soprintendenza, placed Torre Velasca under historic protection, cementing its status as an officially recognized icon of postwar Italian architecture.

== Gallery ==
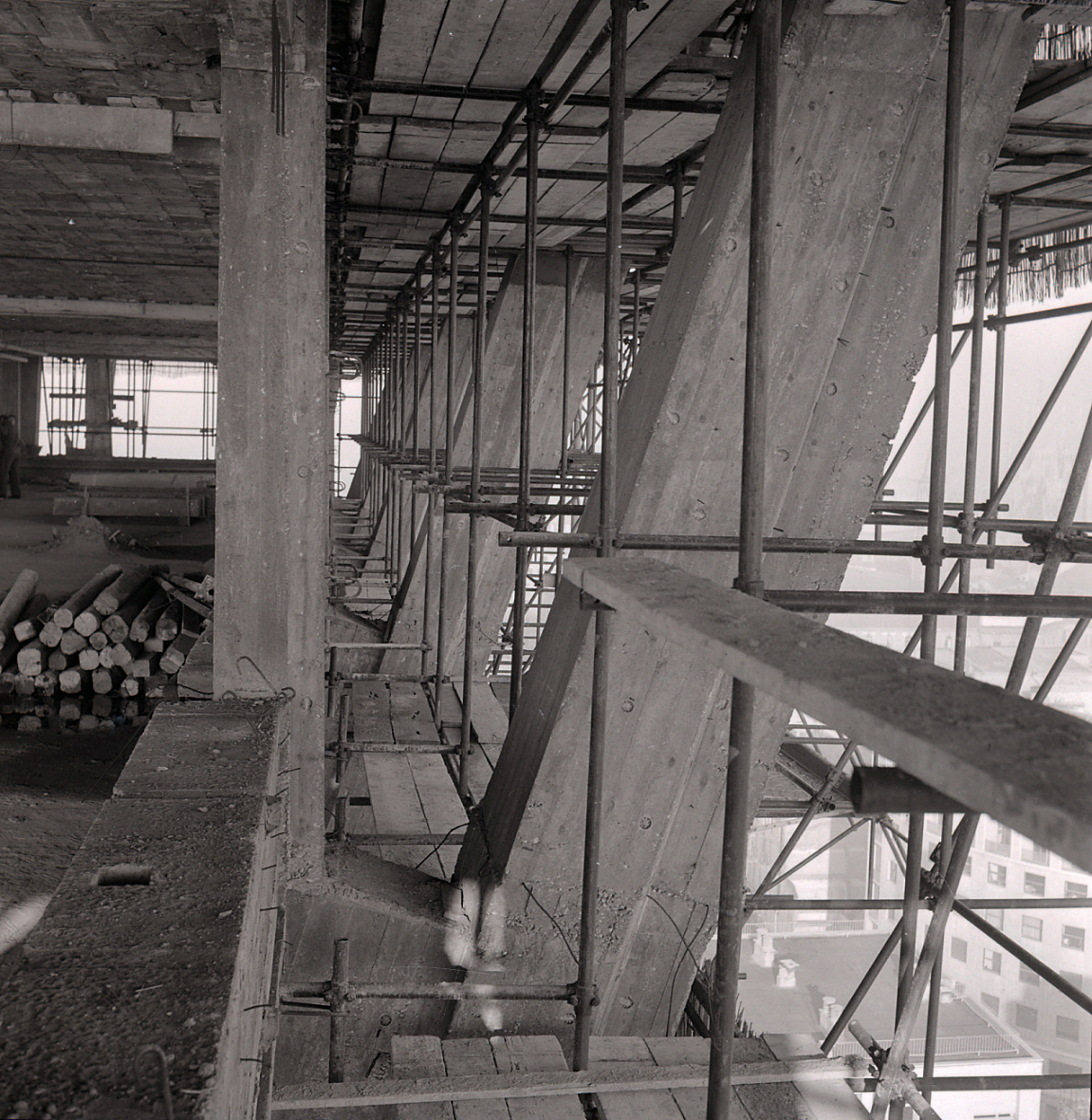
Details of the scaffolds and armor of the concrete during construction in 1956

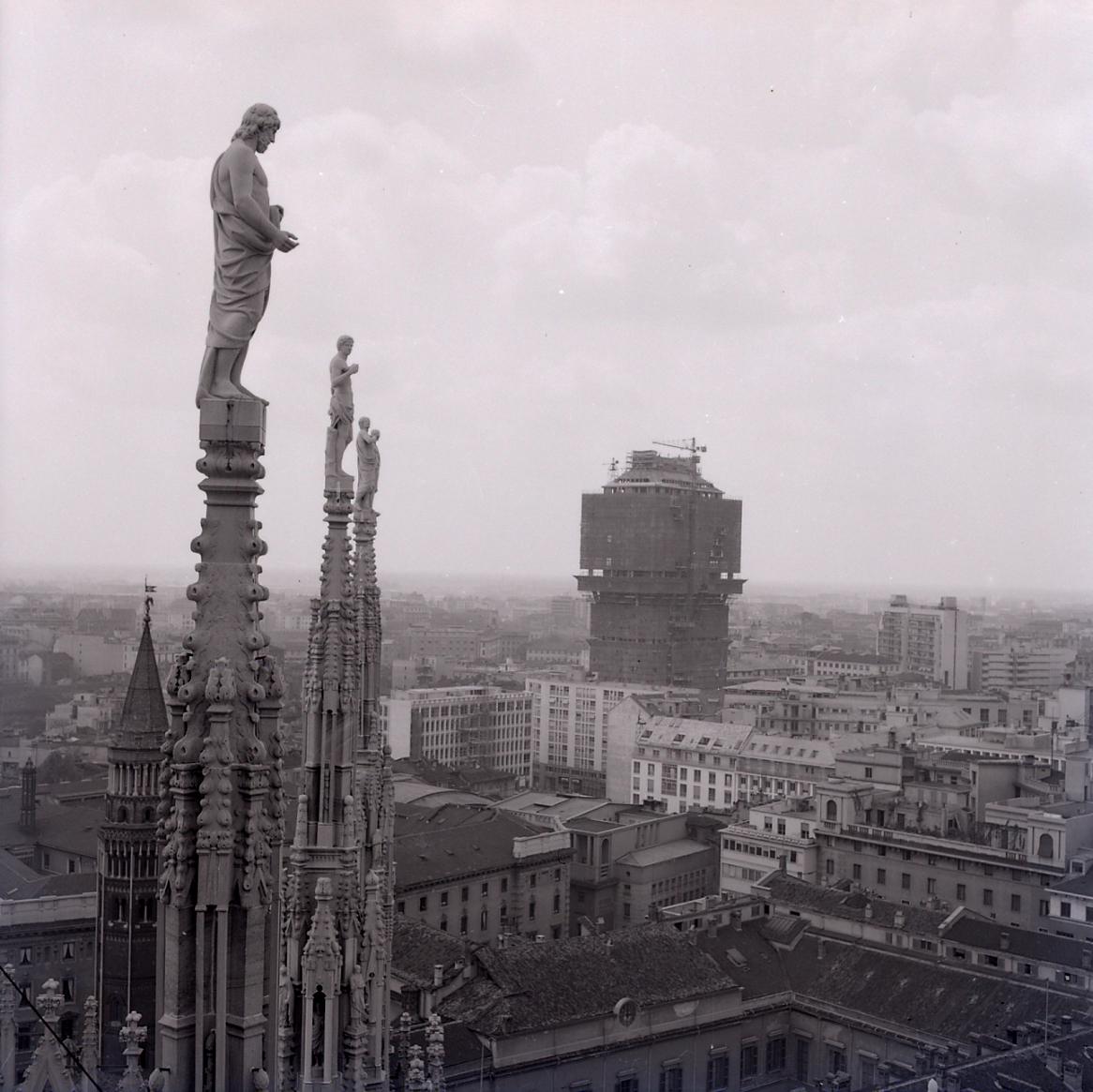
The tower during construction, seen from the Duomo of Milan

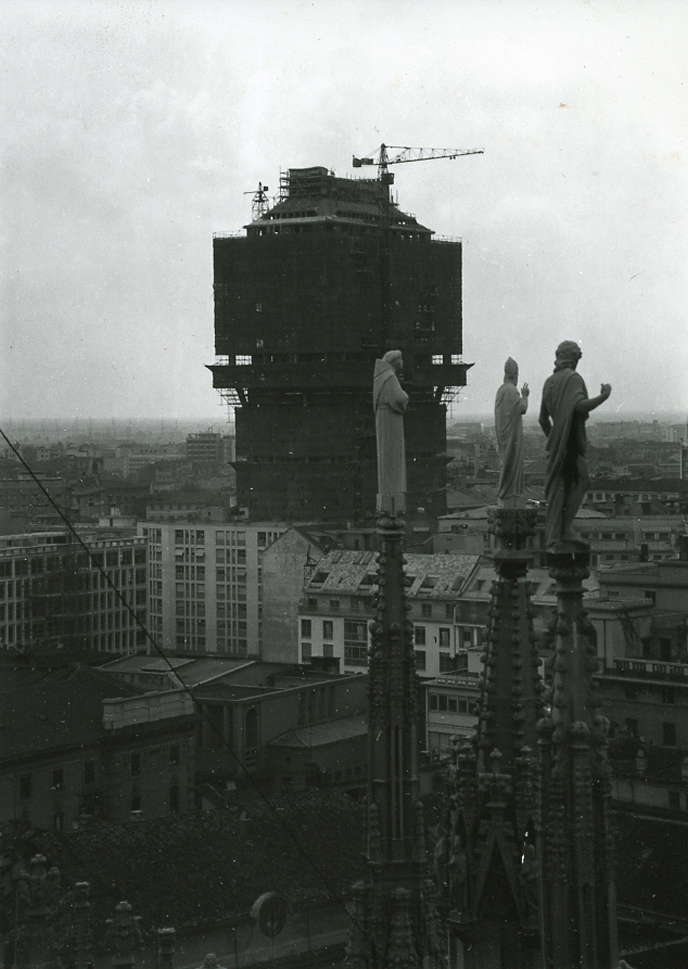
The tower during construction, seen from the Duomo of Milan

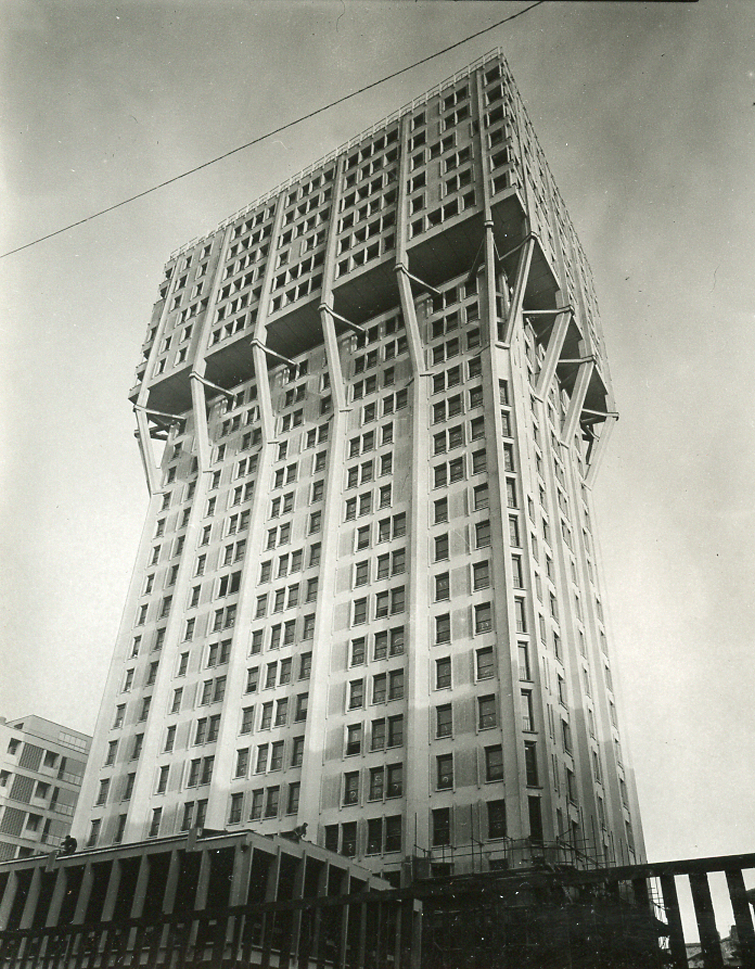
The tower seen from below

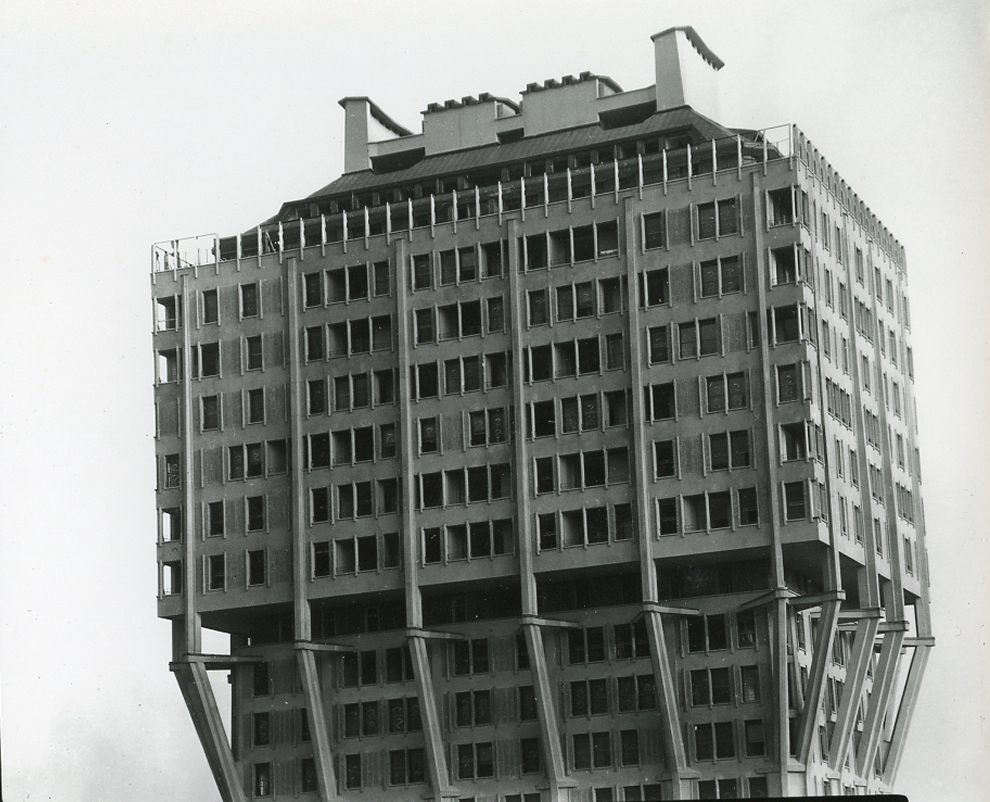
Upper floors

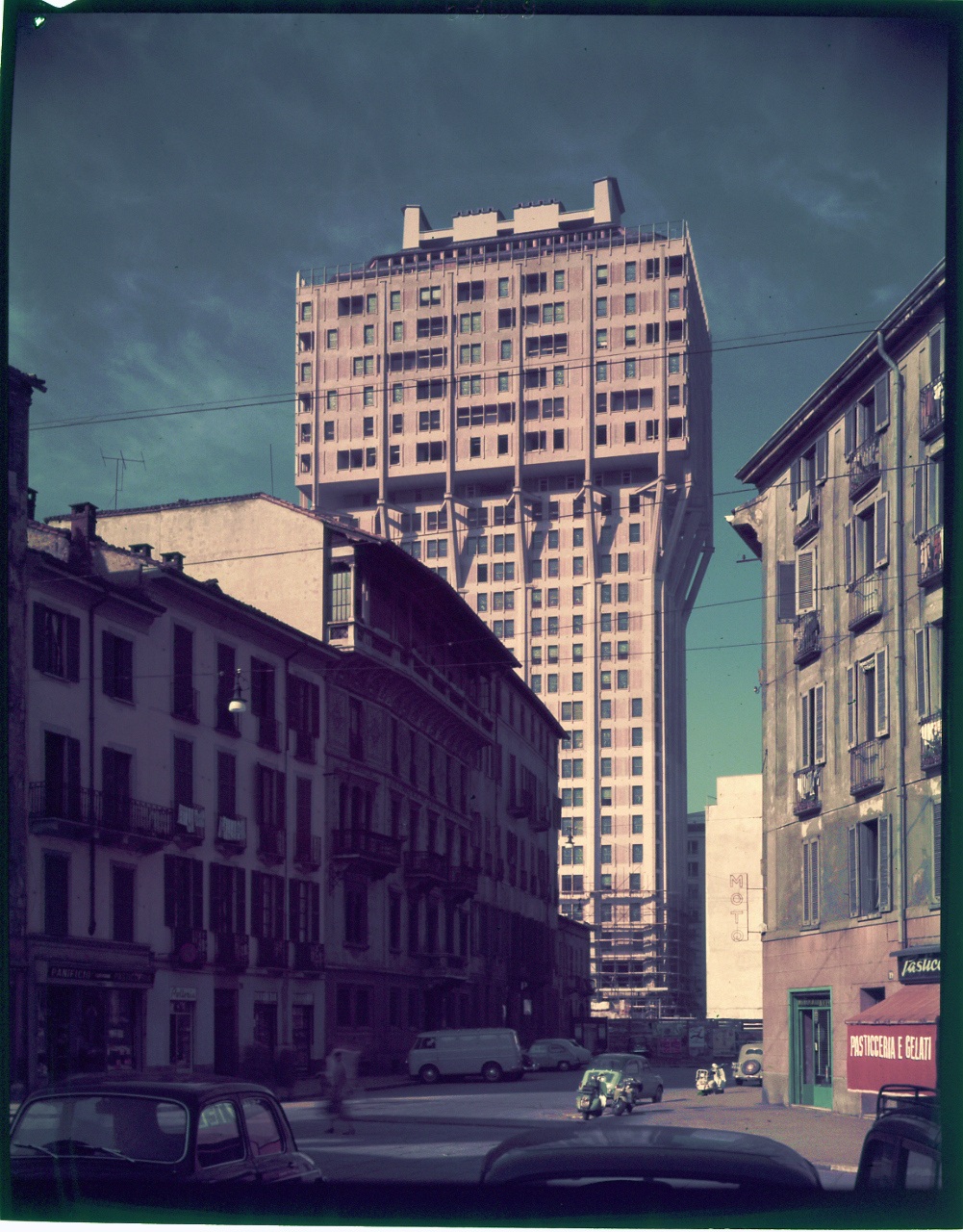

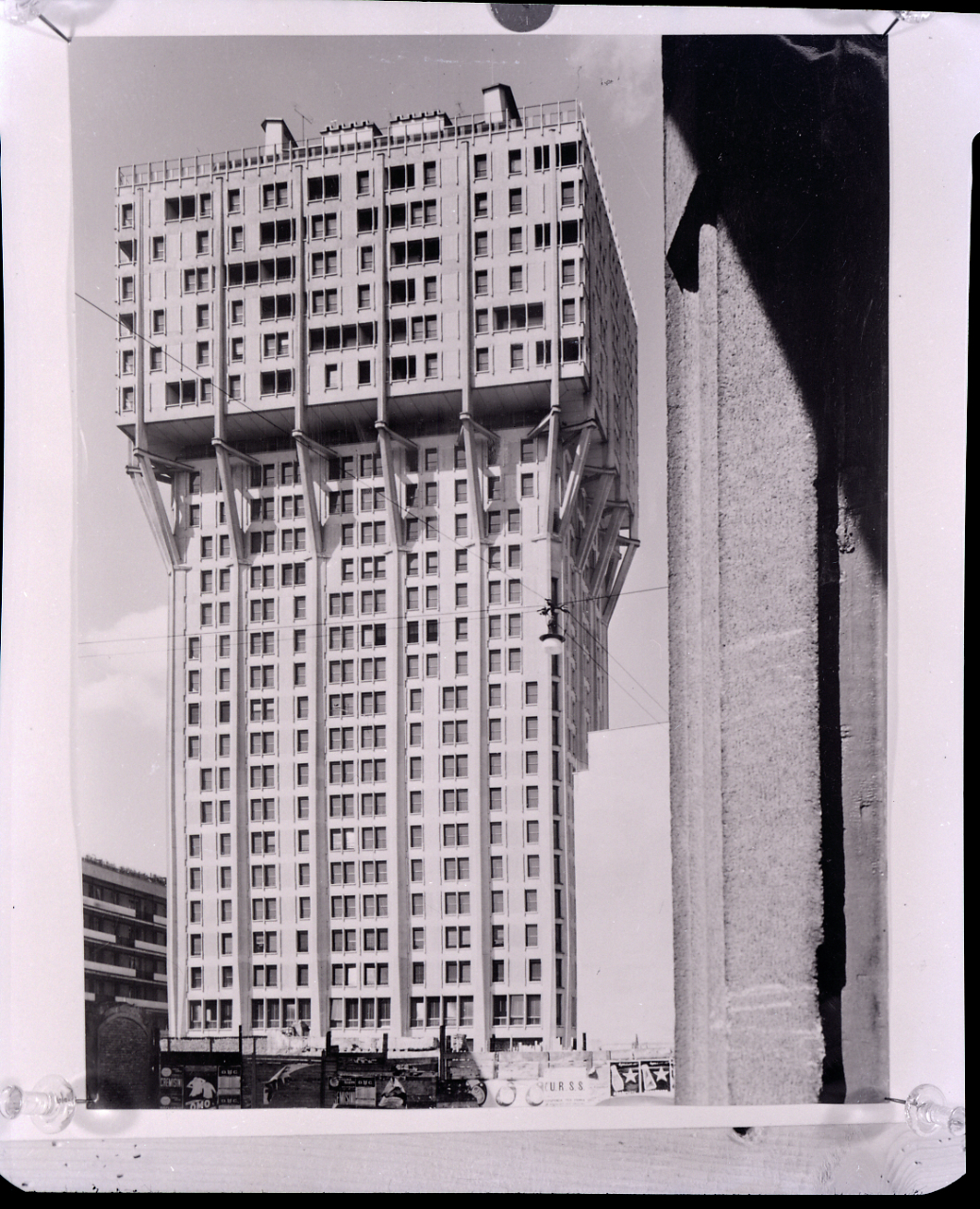
The Torre Velasca photographed by Paolo Monti in 1973

== Popular culture ==
In 2015, the Velasca tower is chosen by the newborn milanese football team AS Velasca and becomes its primary visual identity.

== See also ==
- List of buildings in Milan
- List of Brutalist structures
