= Franca Helg =

Italian designer and architect (1920–1989)

- Born: 21 February 1920; Milan
- Died: 4 June 1989 (aged 69); Milan
- Education: Polytechnic University of Milan
- Occupation: Architect
- Practice: Polytechnic University of Milan

Franca Helg (21 February 1920 – 4 June 1989) was an Italian designer and architect. She also had a career teaching at Istituto Universitario Architettura Venezia and the Polytechnic of Milan. She collaborated with Franco Albini from 1945 through 1977.

== Biography ==
Graduated from the Politecnico di Milano in 1945, Franca Helg was active both in the field of architectural planning and in industrial design, with important project interventions often in collaboration with Franco Albini, with whom she was for long associated professionally, from 1951 until the death of Albini in 1977. After which she worked with Marco Albini and Antonio Piva.

After having been assistant to the seat of architectural composition held by Lodovico Barbiano di Belgiojoso first at the Istituto Universitario di Architettura di Venezia (Iuav) and then at then at the Politecnico di Milano, there followed associate teaching in 1967, teaching the same discipline, in which she became tenured in 1984.

Among her works, the Roman stores La Rinascente, in Piazza Fiume, the Terme Luigi Zoja of Salsomaggiore, the Museo degli Eremitani in Padova.

== Awards ==
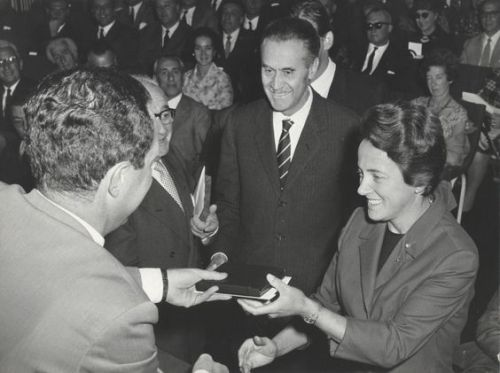
Helg and Albini at 1964 Compasso d'Oro award ceremony

- 1964 Compasso d'Oro: Awarded to Franco Albini, Bob Noorda, and Franca Helg for the signage, graphic design, and interior design of the Milan underground.

== Works ==
- designed furniture and houseware for Poggi, Bonacina, and San Lorenzo
- (with Franco Albini)
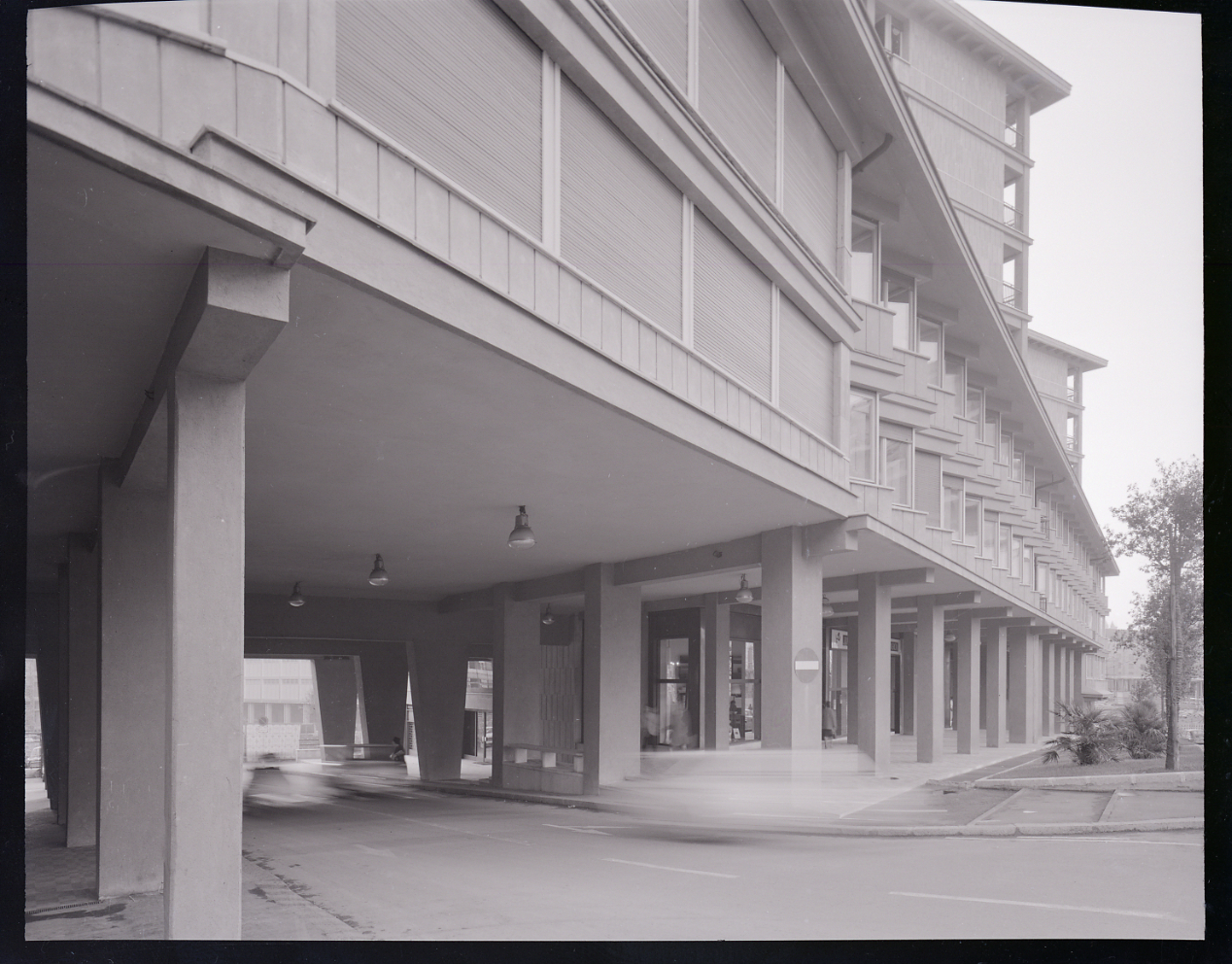
  The neighborhood of Piccapietra in Genova projected by the architects Franco Albini and Franca Helg portrayed by the Italian photographer Paolo Monti
  - Restoration of the Burial Monument of Margherita di Lussemburgo
  - Design of the interiors of the Museo del Tesoro della Cattedrale di San Lorenzo
  - Furnishings of the Metropolitana di Milano (Compasso d'oro prize 1964)
  - Olivetti store in Paris
  - The neighborhood of Piccapietra in Genova
  - Completion of the Museo di Sant'Agostino, annexed to the Chiesa di Sant'Agostino in Genova (1956–1986)
  - Casa Zambelli in Forlì
  - Palazzo La Rinascente a Roma (regional prize IN/ARCH for Lazio 1963)
- Molino Dorino station of the Metropolitana di Milano (1980–1985)
- Museo degli Eremitani in the convent complex annexed to the church by the same name (1982–1985)
- designed furniture with and without Franco Albini
