= Franco Albini =

Italian architect and designer (1905–1977)

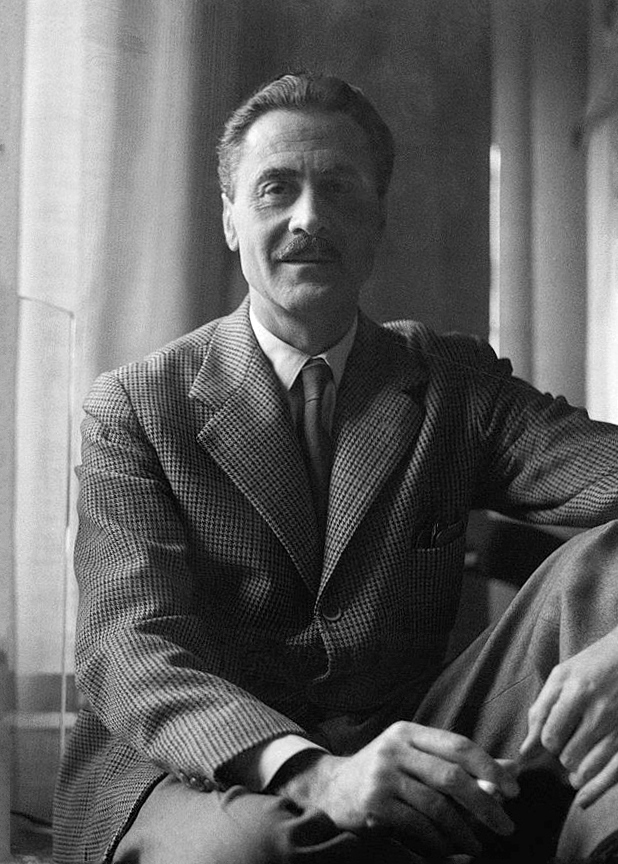
- Born: 17 October 1905; Robbiate
- Died: 1 November 1977 (aged 72); Milan
- Education: Polytechnic University of Milan
- Occupations: Architect, designer, urban planner, furniture designer
- Awards: Honorary Royal Designer for Industry (1971)

Franco Albini (17 October 1905 – 1 November 1977) was an Italian Neo-Rationalist architect, designer and university instructor in design.

== Education and career ==
A native of Robbiate, near Milan, Albini obtained his degree in architecture at Politecnico di Milano University in 1929 and began his professional career working for Gio Ponti. He started displaying his works at the Milan Triennale, and in 1930 he opened his own practice.

=== Design of objects ===
Through his creations, the modern furniture design merged the Italian traditional artisanship with the new forms of modernism. In his creations, he used raw, inexpensive materials. This also meant an elegant design based on a minimalist aesthetic.

One of his first successful works in 1939 was a radio, encased in glass, so to show its internal components.

In 1928, Albini designed the now-iconic "Albini Desk", combining steel, glass and wood with a striking minimalistic balance, and introduced by Knoll in 1949. In 1950, he designed the famous and fashionable "Margherita" and "Gala" chairs, made of woven cane. In 1952 he created the "Fiorenza" armchair for Arflex; in 1955 the "Luisa" chair, for which he was awarded the Compasso d'Oro; in 1956 the "Rocking chaise" for Poggi.

=== Industrial and architectural designs ===
In the 1960s, he worked on industrial design as well as important architectural projects. In 1961, he designed the Rome Rinascente building. Three years later, he designed with Franca Helg and Bob Noorda the Milan Metro Line 1 subway stations, and from 1969 also the Milan Metro Line 2 subway stations. In 196,4 the television set he created for Brionvega was displayed at the Milan Triennial XIII. In the same year, he created various lamps for Arteluce.

Albini worked for companies including Brionvega, Cassina, Arflex, Arteluce and Poggi.

He was also an architect and interior designer. Among others, in 1945, he created the Zanini Fur Shop located in Milan. As a writer and editor, from 1945 to 1946, he worked for the Italian magazine Casabella. In the 1950s and 1960s, he taught interior design at the Venice School of Architecture (Università Iuav di Venezia). From 1963 to 1977, he taught design at Milan Polytechnic (Politecnico di Milano).

== Awards and recognition ==
In 1971 he was appointed an Honorary Royal Designer for Industry (RDI) by the Royal Society for Arts (RSA) in London.

Albini obtained three Compasso d'Oro awards, the most prestigious Italian design prize.

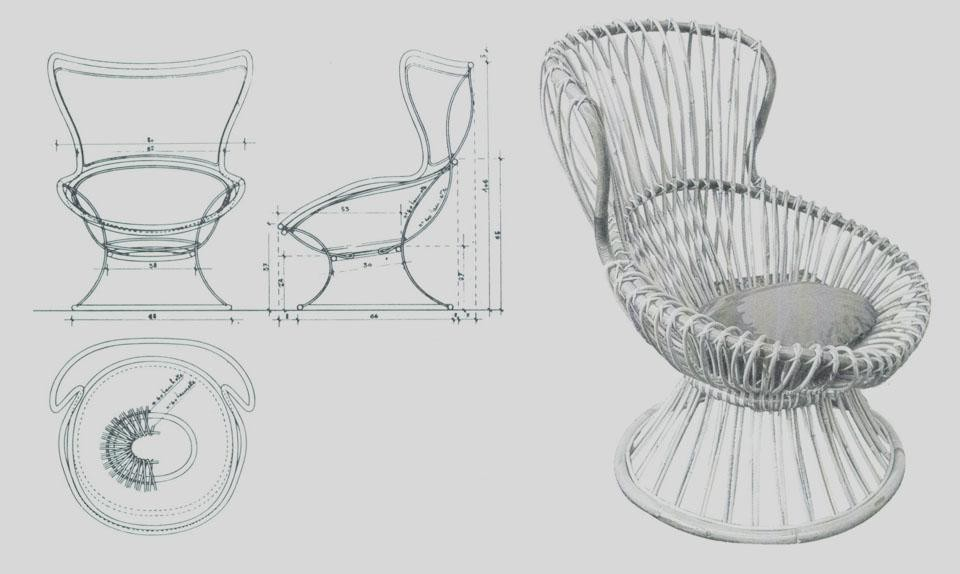
Margherita Armchair designed with Gino Colombini (1951)

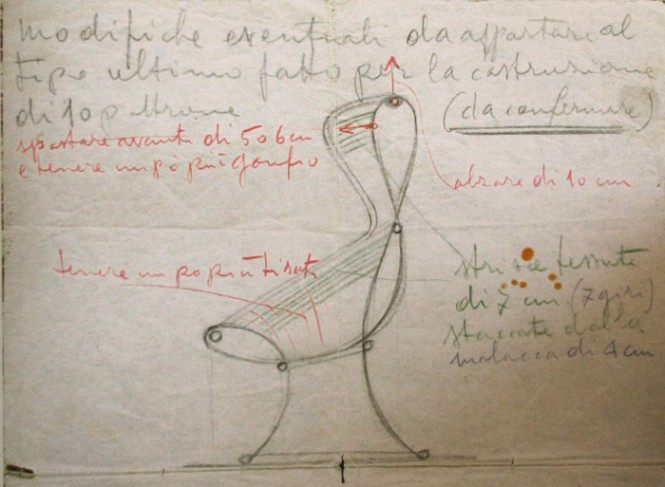
Margherita Chair (developmental sketch with notes)

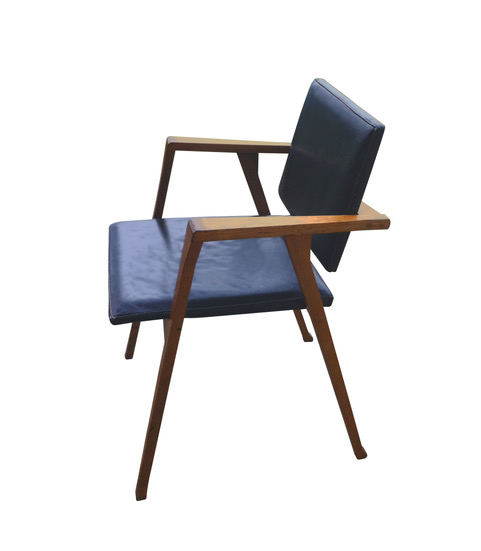
Luisa armchair (1955)

== Publications ==
- Piva, Antonio; Vittorio Prina (1998). Franco Albini 1905–1977. Milan: Electa.
- Sherer, Daniel. "Rationalism and Paradox in Franco Albini's and Franca Helg's Architecture and Design, 1934–1977," in D. Sherer, Aldo Colonetti, eds. Franco Albini and Franca Helg Design (Milan, 2009), 9–38.
- Leet, Stephen. Franco Albini, Architecture and Design, 1934–1977 (Princeton Architectural Press, New York, 1990).
- Jones, Kay Bea. Suspending Modernity: The Architecture of Franco Albini, Surrey: Ashgate, 2014
