= Gino Colombini =

Italian architect and designer (1915–2011)

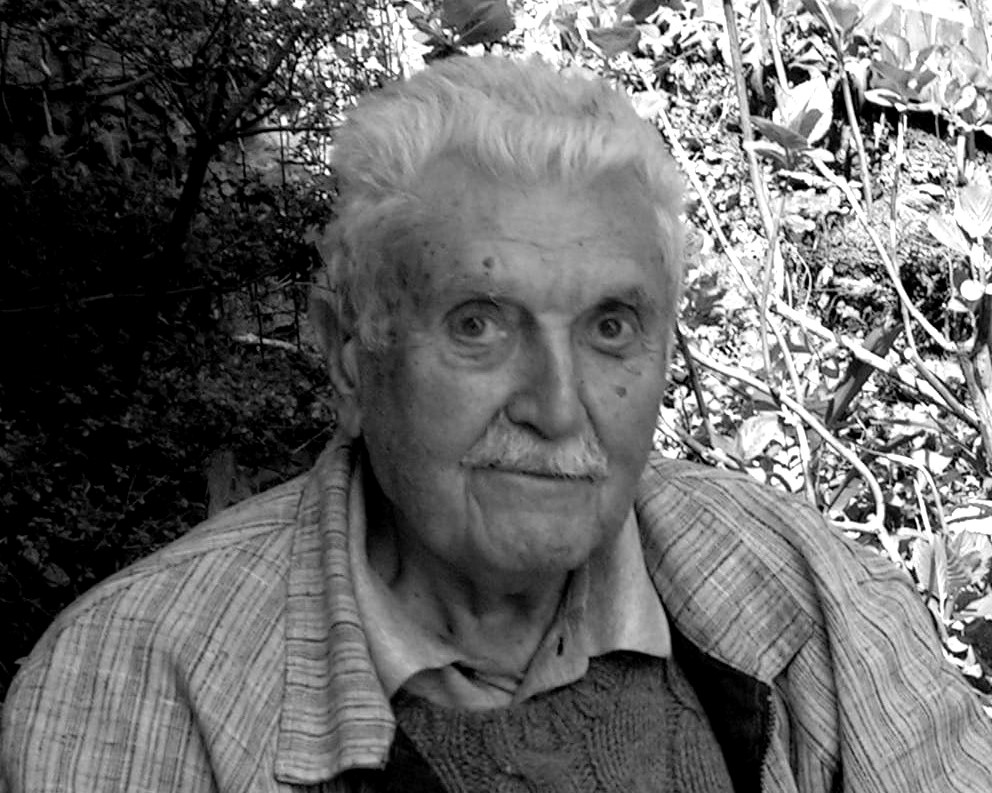
- Born: 1 January 1915; Milan, Italy
- Died: 30 January 2011 (aged 96)
- Occupations: Architect; Industrial designer
- Employers: Franco Albini; Kartell
- Known for: Design Works at Kartell
- Awards: Compasso d'Oro awards in 1955, 1957, 1958, 1959 and 1960.

Gino Colombini (1915–2011) was an Italian architect and industrial designer.

From 1933 to 1952, Colombini worked in the Milan practice of the architect and designer Franco Albini.

From 1953 to 1960, Colombini was the technical director of Kartell, which was founded by Giulio Castelli to produce plastic injection moulded products. Kartell produced modern household appliances that were distinctive and colourful, which represented a complete transition from the typical utilitarian aesthetic of the 1950s.

Colombini designed many household products for Kartell that were revolutionary and affordable examples of everyday items. His products include a carpet beater (1957), a lemon squeezer (1958), plastic wash basins, salad colanders, lunch boxes and a long-handled cleaning scoop (1959). One of his most famous designs is a round umbrella stand made from ABS plastic with a stainless steel ashtray top (1965).

Colombini was awarded the Compasso d'Oro for designs that he produced for Kartell in 1955, 1957, 1958, 1959, and 1960. He died in 2011.

== Awards ==
Year	Award	Result
1955	Compasso d'Oro	Won
1957	Compasso d'Oro	Won
1958	Compasso d'Oro	Won
1959	Compasso d'Oro	Won
1960	Compasso d'Oro	Won
