= Enrico Peressutti =

Italian architect and designer (1908–1976)

- Born: 28 August 1908; Pinzano al Tagliamento, Province of Udine, Kingdom of Italy
- Died: 3 May 1976 (aged 67); Milan, Italy
- Education: Polytechnic University of Milan
- Occupations: Architect, designer

Enrico Peressutti (28 August 1908 – 3 May 1976) was an Italian architect and designer, best known as a founding member of the architectural group BBPR, which played an important role in Italian modern architecture and post-war architectural culture.

== Life and career ==
Born in Pinzano al Tagliamento, Peressutti studied architecture at the Polytechnic University of Milan, where he graduated in 1932. The same year he founded the BBPR studio with Gian Luigi Banfi, Lodovico Barbiano di Belgiojoso and Ernesto Nathan Rogers. The group participated in the activities of the Congrès Internationaux d'Architecture Moderne (CIAM) and contributed to the development of Rationalist architecture.

Among the early works of BBPR were the Casa del sabato per gli sposi for the Milan Triennial V (1933), exhibition designs, the urban studies for the Aosta Valley and the Post Office building at the EUR district in Rome (1940). During World War II Peressutti served on the Eastern Front and later joined the Italian resistance movement.

After the war he continued the BBPR practice with Belgiojoso and Rogers. The studio contributed to the reconstruction of Milan and designed several important works, including the Torre Velasca in Milan (1950–1958), the restoration of the Sforza Castle (1954–1956), the INA-Casa neighbourhood in Cesate, and the Museo Monumento al Deportato in Carpi (1973).

Peressutti also worked in industrial design and exhibition design, creating interiors, furniture, lighting and products such as electric clocks for Solari di Udine. He taught architecture internationally, including at the Massachusetts Institute of Technology, Princeton University and Yale University.

Peressutti died in Milan in 1976.

== Sources ==
- Bonfanti, Ezio; Porta, Marco (1973). Città, museo e architettura. Il gruppo BBPR nella cultura architettonica italiana 1932-1970 (in Italian). Florence: Vallecchi.
- Enrico Peressutti gruppo architetti BBPR. L'uomo l'architetto l'artista nel centenario della nascita (in Italian). Pinzano al Tagliamento. 2008.
