= Giovanni Colombini (painter) =

Italian painter

Giovanni Colombini (c. 1700–1774) was an Italian painter of the late-Baroque or Rococo period. He was born in Marca Trivigiana (March of Treviso), and painted in the style of Sebastiano Ricci. He painted frescoes in the Convent of the Dominicans in Treviso.

Giovanni Colombini (Founder of the Congregation of Jesuati) shares the same name.

== Sources ==
- Boni, Filippo de' (1852). Biografia degli artisti ovvero dizionario della vita e delle opere dei pittori, degli scultori, degli intagliatori, dei tipografi e dei musici di ogni nazione che fiorirono da'tempi più remoti sino á nostri giorni. Seconda Edizione.. Venice; Googlebooks: Presso Andrea Santini e Figlio. p. 236.
