= Giulia Molino Colombini =

Italian educator, writer and poet

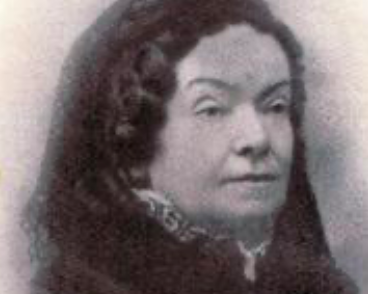
- Born: 22 May 1812
- Died: 3 August 1879 (aged 67)
- Occupations: Poet, educator

Giulia Molino Colombini (22 May 1812 in Turin – 3 August 1879 in Turin) was an Italian educator, writer and poet.

== Life ==
Giulia Molino was born on 22 May 1812 in Turin to a wealthy family. Her father was Antonio Molino and her mother was Maria Caveglia.

In 1832 at the age of twenty she married a doctor from Miradolo Gian Lorenzo Colombini. They had a son, Camillo. At the age of 22, Molino Colombini became a widow. Molino Colombini dedicated herself to educating her son and to the literary and pedagogical studies that made her esteemed among contemporary moderate liberal Catholic writers, such as Silvio Pellico and Vincenzo Giobetti.

== Work ==
In 1830s and 1840s Molino Colombini as a poet contributed to the formation and dissemination of Risorgimento discourse. She formed the women's section for the study of the languages of the Philological Circle. Molino Colombini cared that women were not ignorant and superficial and believed that they cannot accomplish their task as mothers in a dignified manner unless they are educated.

According to Molino Colombini, the three-centuries-long slumber of Italy was caused by women's lack of religion faith, which had made them unable to carry out their domestic priesthood. However, she opposed to feminism in the name of the spiritual values of life and disparaged the importance of material goods and political participation.

After the unification of Italy, she was assigned to research on the type of studies for women at the Ministry of Education. In 1876, Molino Colombini was appointed a general inspector of the Piedmont’s schools and sent a report to the Ministry of Education regarding the reorganization of primary schools. In 1879, she was called to Rome to take park in the work of the Ministerial Commission for the selection of school textbooks. Among others she included two of Vittoria Colonna’s sonnets in the anthology for female students Esempi di prosa e di poesia.

Giulia Molino Colombini died on 3 August 1879 in Turin and was buried in the Municipality arch dedicated to illustrious figures who contributed to unification of Italy, near Vincenzo Gioberti and Silvio Pellico. Magistral Institute Giulia Molino Colombini of Piacenza and streets in several Italian cities were named after her.

== Works (selection) ==
- Inno per la nascita del Reale Principe in Piemonte (Torino: s.n., 1844)
- Pensieri e lettere sulla educazione della donna in Italia (Pinerolo: G. Chiantore, 1860)
- Le donne del poema di Dante (Firenze: Galileiana di M. Cellini, 1865)
- A Maria: canzone (Firenze: Tip. Galileiana, 1868?)
- Sulla educazione della donna (Torino: T. Vaccarino, 1869)
- Del Bello: dialoghi (Firenze: Galileiana di M. Cellini, 1869)
- La Castellania di Miradolo: racconto storico (Pinerolo: G. Chiantore, 1871)
- Nella inaugurazione della scuola femminile per lo studio delle lingue straniere viventi ... (Torino: Tip. naz. di C. Marietti e C., 1871)
- A Diodata Saluzzo decoro delle donne italiane per virtù grande: nel primo centenario dalla sua nascita (Torino: Tip. Vercellino, 1874)
- Esempi di prosa e di poesia ... (Torino: G. B. Paravia, 1880)
- Il Colle di s. Bartolomeo (prarostino): ode (Pinerolo: Chiantore e Mascarelli, 1887)
