= Gian Luigi Banfi =

Italian architect (1910–1945)

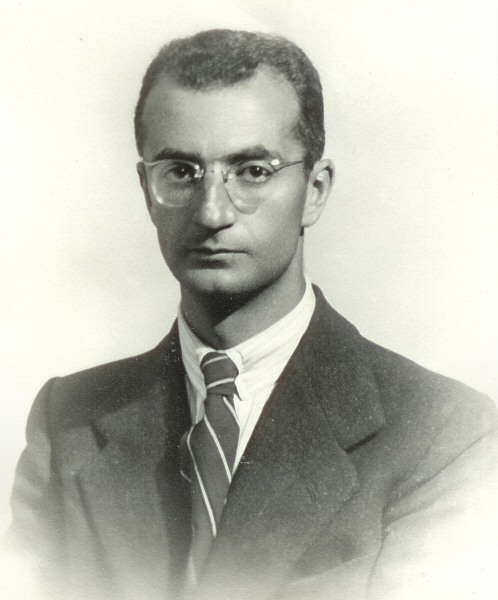
- Born: 2 April 1910; Milan, Kingdom of Italy
- Died: 10 April 1945 (aged 35); Gusen, Austria
- Occupation: Architect

Gian Luigi Banfi (2 April 1910 – 10 April 1945) was an Italian architect and a founding member of the architectural group BBPR, together with Lodovico Barbiano di Belgiojoso, Enrico Peressutti and Ernesto Nathan Rogers.

Born in Milan, Banfi graduated in architecture in 1932 and collaborated with BBPR on projects connected with the Rationalist movement, including exhibitions, urban planning studies and architectural works such as the heliotherapy centre of Legnano and the EUR Post Office in Rome.

During World War II he joined the Italian Resistance. Arrested in 1944 for his antifascist activities, he was deported to the Mauthausen concentration camp system, where he died in Gusen in 1945.

A Stolperstein commemorating Banfi was placed on 19 January 2017 in front of the former BBPR studio at Via dei Chiostri 2 in Milan.
