= BBPR =

Italian architectural partnership

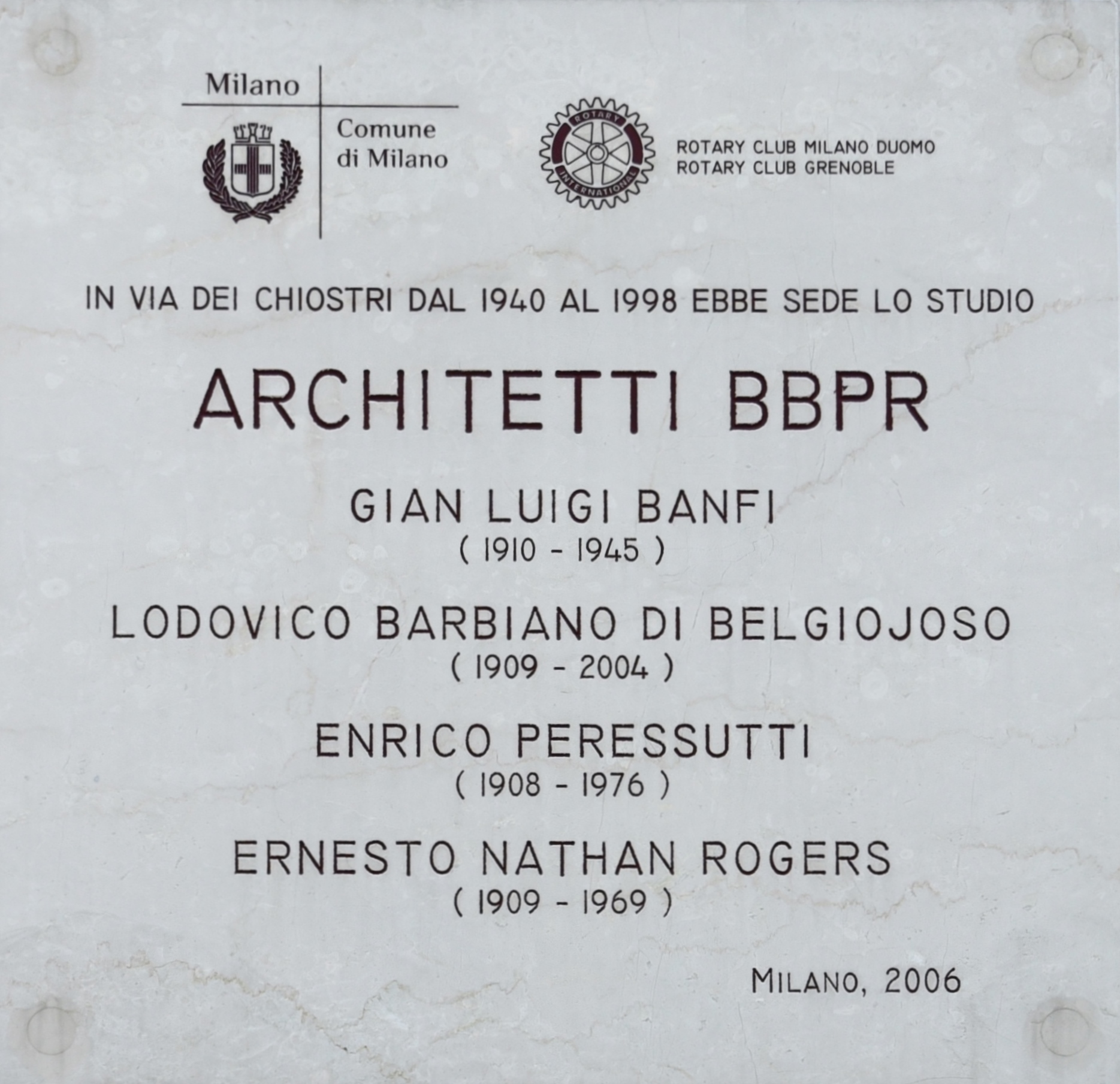
- Memorial plaque, Milan

Practice information
- Founders: Gian Luigi Banfi, Lodovico Barbiano di Belgiojoso, Enrico Peressutti, Ernesto Nathan Rogers
- Founded: 1932
- Dissolved: 1990s
- Location: Milan, Italy

Significant works and honors
- Buildings: Torre Velasca, Torre BBPR

BBPR was an architectural partnership founded in Milan, Italy in 1932.

== Partnership ==
The BBPR studio was formed in Milan in 1932 in a climate described by Giorgio Ciucci as “oscillating between differing and contrasting positions.” The name of the firm was an acronym derived from the first letter of each of the partners' family name: Gian Luigi Banfi (1910–1945), Lodovico Barbiano di Belgiojoso (1909–2004), Enrico Peressutti (1908–1976), and Ernesto Nathan Rogers (1909–1969).

Their contribution to the development of Rationalism is evident not only in their architecture but in their involvement with MIAR and the journal Quadrante born as a rival to Casabella. Their work held general appeal and was also appreciated and promoted by Edoardo Persico and Giuseppe Pagano at Casabella. Along with the editor Valentino Bompiani, the BBPR group is credited for the original idea for the Italian Civilisation building. The selection of the Guerrini-La Padula-Romano project was fraught with polemics since it is argued that their eulogy to the most Roman of architectural motif – the arch – is what won them first prize, a prize which some say deservedly belonged to the Milanese architects. Their adherence to Fascism was short-lived and they soon became members of the resistance: Banfi and Belgiojoso were imprisoned at the Mauthausen concentration camp where Banfi died and Rogers, being of Jewish descent, was forced into exile in Switzerland.

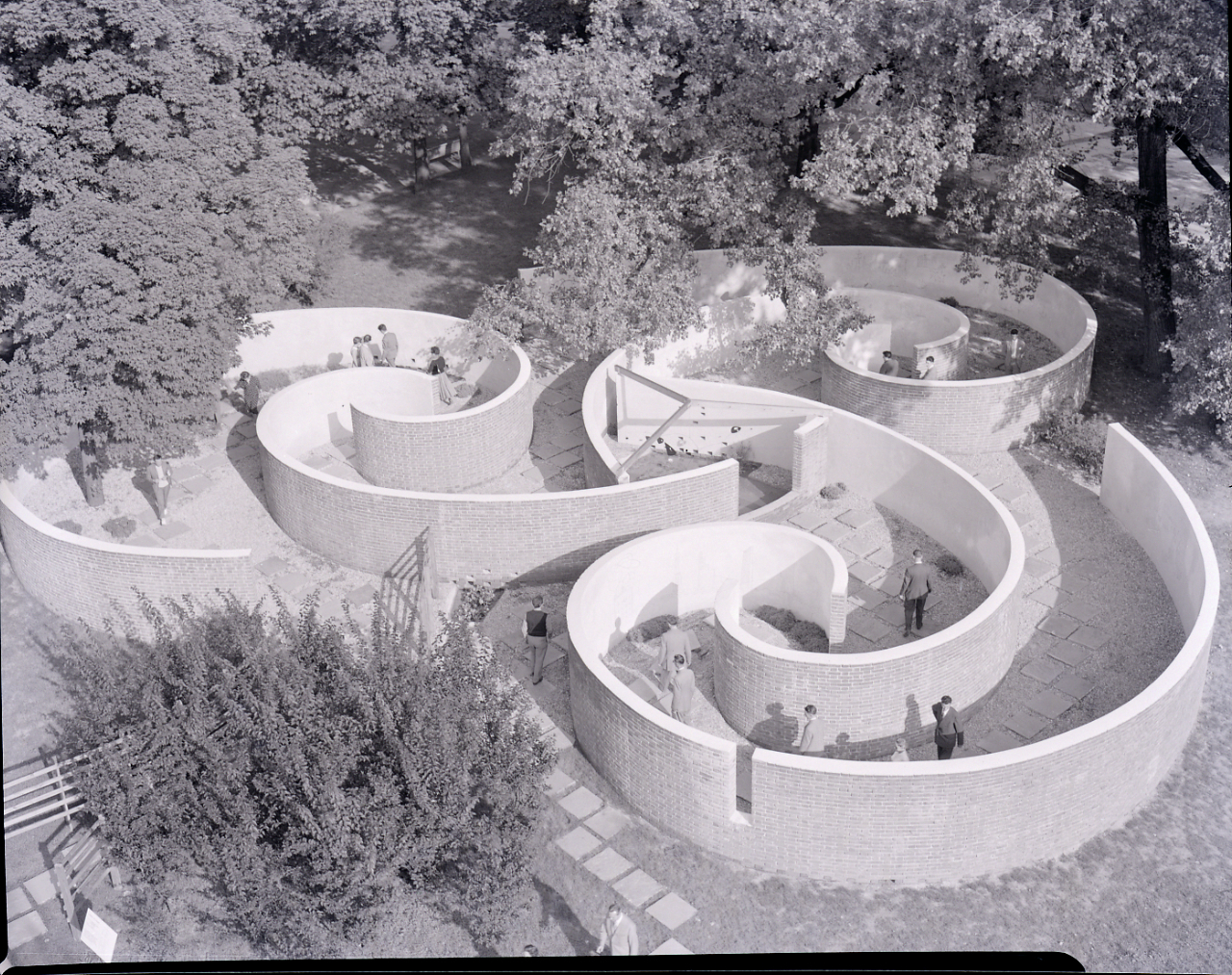
Milan. X Triennale. "Labyrinth for Youth", assembled at Parco Sempione.

The practice continued under the same name after the Second World War despite the death of Banfi in Mauthausen concentration camp.

The firm came to notice after World War II with the abstract design for the Monument to the Victims of Nazi Concentration Camps, erected within the Cimitero Monumentale di Milano. Located in the centre of an open plaza, its white, tubular frame encloses a glass cube that holds a mess tin containing blood-soaked earth from the Mauthausen-Gusen concentration camp in Austria. Panels of black and white marble bear inscriptions about martyrdom and persecution, justice and freedom. Around the Monument, a series of tombstone-shaped plaques show an alphabetical list of names of Milanesi who died in concentration camps.

BBPR reacted against the polemic of the International Style in 1954, with the creation of the Torre Velasca in Milan, complete with its abstract medieval references. The tower responds to its prominent location near the Milan Cathedral in the city's historic centre.

The firm was subsequently employed to create new interior spaces and exhibition designs for the museums housed within Milan's Castello Sforzesco, which had been severely damaged by allied bombing in 1943.

== Buildings and projects ==
- 1933 – House of Saturday for the newlyweds at the V Triennale di Milano (with Piero Portaluppi; – demolished)
- 1934 – Various rooms at the Italian Aeronautical Exhibition.
- 1935 – Building for homes and offices owned by Feltrinelli
- 1935 – Hall of tennis and Hall of motoring at the National Sport Exhibition
- 1937 – Rice deposits and nursery school in the province of Vercelli
- 1938 – Eliotherapy colony, Legnano
- 1938 – Town planning and study of the pavilions for the new Trade Fair, Milan (project)
- 1939–1941 – Palazzo delle Poste at E42, via Ludwig Beethoven, Rome
- 1945 – Milan City Plan, known as AR
- 1948 – Perego-owned residential and office building, Milan
- 1951 – INA-Casa district in Cesate, Milan
- 1954 – Exhibition hall for Olivetti in Fifth Avenue, New York
- 1954 – Pavilion The children's labyrinth at the 10th Milan Triennale (demolished)
- 1956 – Restoration and refurbishment of the Sforzesco Castle, Milan
- 1958 – Torre Velasca in Piazza Velasca, Milan – (IN / ARCH Award for a completed work – 1961
- 1959 – Office and residential building between Piazza Statuto and Corso Francia, Turin
- 1960 – E. Ritter house in Stintino
- 1961 – Velarca, the 19-meter boat house anchored along the western shore of Lake Como
- 1963 – Residential building in via Vigna, Milan
- 1964 – Hispano-Olivetti building in Ronda de la Universidad, Barcelona
- 1964 – Piezometric tower in via Morane, Modena
- 1965 – Headquarters of the Italian Commercial Bank (today Banca Intesa), via Mariano Stabile, Palermo
- 1967 – Case Andreatta in Pinzolo
- 1968 – New India Assurance residential and tertiary building in Bombay
- 1969 – Headquarters of the Giornale di Sicilia, via Lincoln, Palermo
- 1969 – Office building (Chase Manhattan Bank) in Piazza Meda in Milan
- 1970 – Hotel in Capoliveri, Elba Island
- 1970 – Building between corso Buenos Aires, via Piccinni and via Monteverdi, Milan
- 1971 – Cinema Mediolanum in Corso Vittorio Emanuele, Milan
- 1973 – Museum-monument to the political and racial deportee in the Castello dei Pio, Carpi
- 1974 – Palazzo Amoroso, Santo Spirito square, Palermo
- 1975 – University of Calabria in Arcavacata
- 1978 – Shopping center in Riyadh, Saudi Arabia
- 1980 – Hotel and party hall in the Casino of St. Vincent
- 1981 – Residential and office buildings in piazza Maciachini, in via Fetonte, in S. Siro, Milan and Bruzzano
- 1983 – Building for a chemical-pharmaceutical industry in Egypt
- 1987 – S. Bortolo Hospital 5th lot, Vicenza
- 1988 – Restoration of Villa Castiglioni in Magenta
- 1989 – Chemical-pharmaceutical complex, Bari
- 1990 – ATM headquarters in via Monte Rosa in Milan
- 1991 – Renovation plan of the Old City of Kuwait
- 1994 – Complex for the University of Studies in the Annunziata area, Messina
- 1994 – Restoration of the Palazzo Reale as the seat of the Museum of Contemporary Art, Milan

== Gallery ==
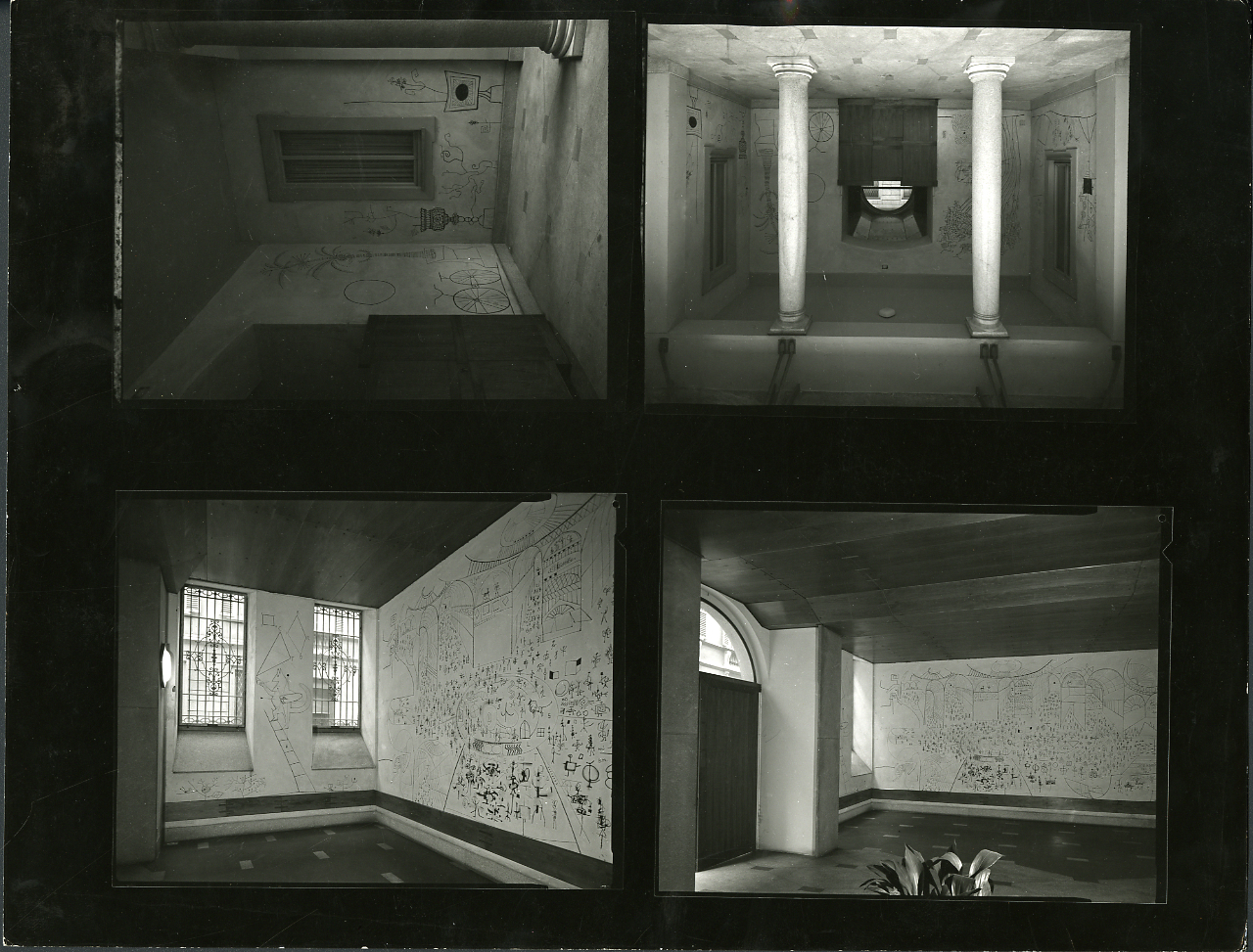
Interiors of Mayer Palace

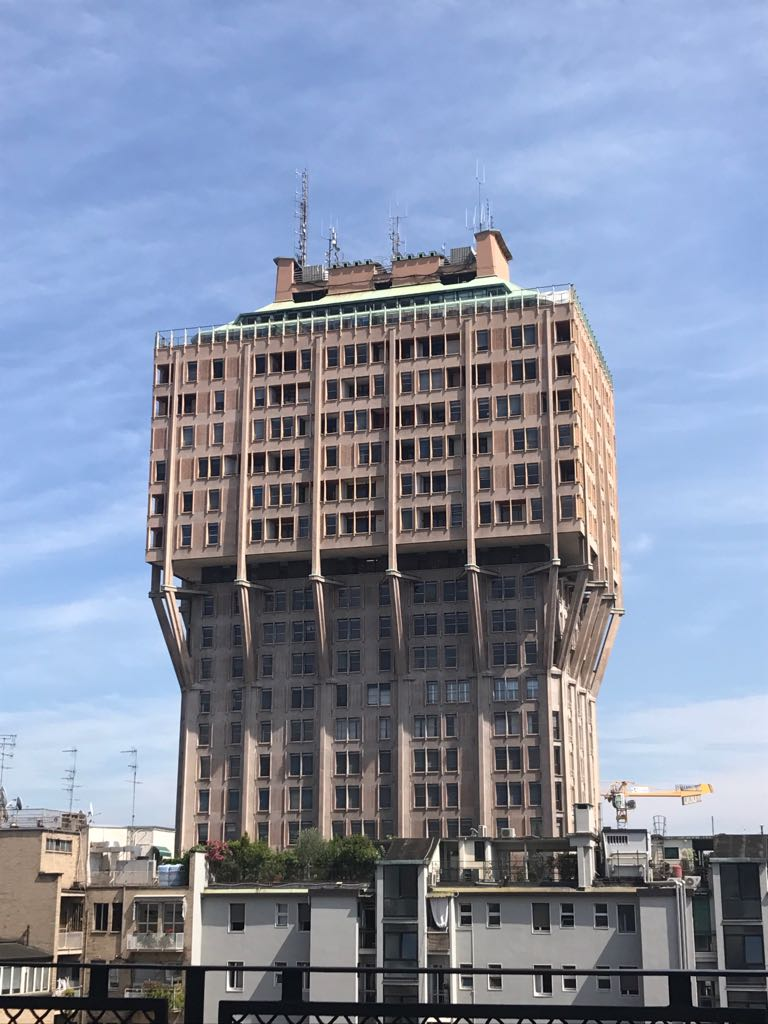
Torre Velasca in Milan, 1958

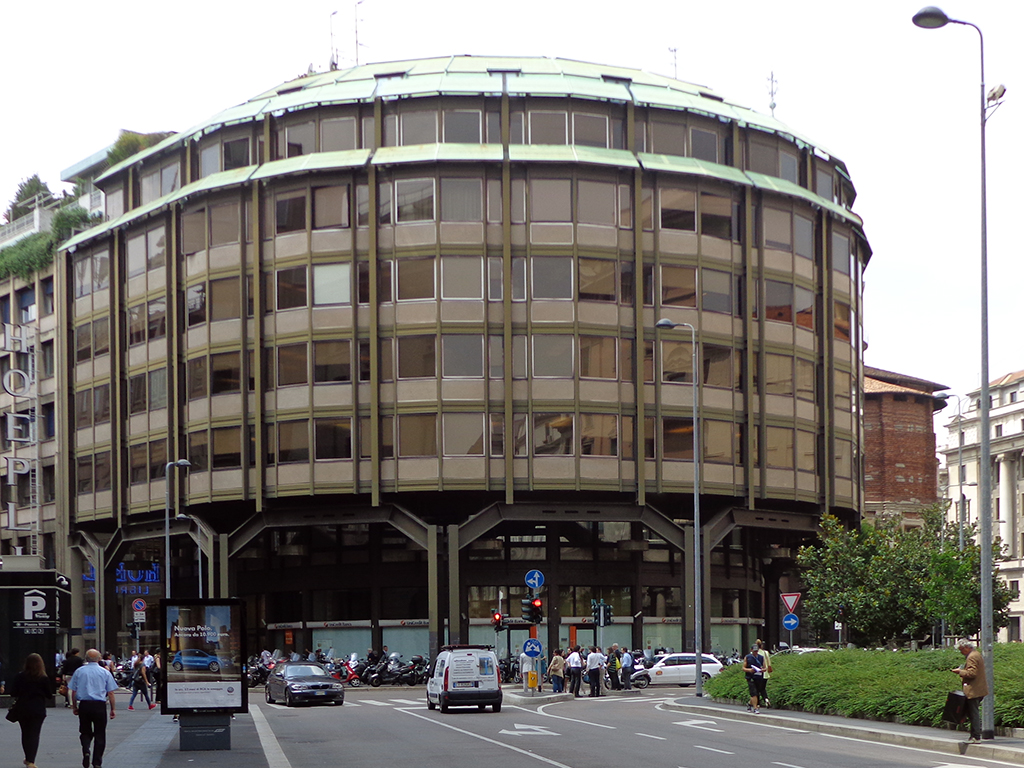
Chase Manhattan Bank building, 1969

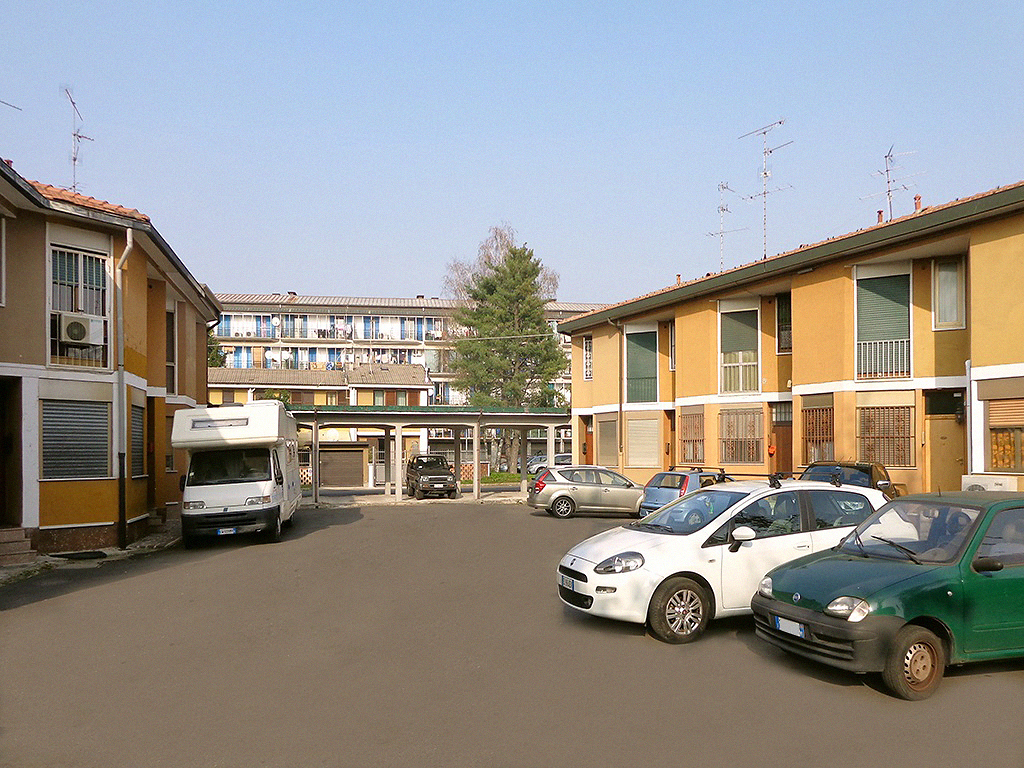
INA Village in Cesate, 1954

== Publications ==
- Fiori Leonardo, Pizzon Massimo (a cura di): B.B.P.R. La Torre Velasca, Abitare Segesta, 1982.
- Piva Antonio (a cura di): B.B.P.R. a Milano, Electa, 1982.
- Società generale immobiliare: Torre Velasca, 26 piani, 800 locali, Società generale immobiliare, 1958.
- Brunetti F.: La Torre Velasca a Milano, Alinea, 1999.
- Rogers E. N.: Il senso della storia, Unicopli, 1999.
- Marcello, Flavia, "Problems of Abstraction. BBPR’s Monument to the Fallen in Concentration Camps, Milan (1946, 1950, 1955)” in K. B. Jones and S. Pilat (eds.) The Routledge companion to Italian Fascist architecture : reception and legacy. Routledge, New York, 2020, 491–506.
