= Ernesto Nathan Rogers =

Italian architect (1909–1969)

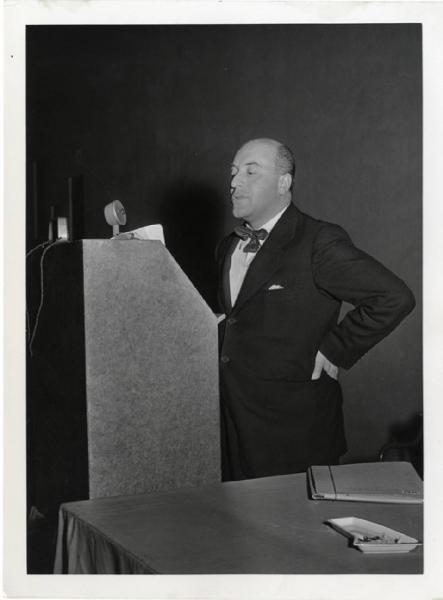
- Rogers in Milan in 1951
- Born: March 16, 1909; Trieste, Cisleithania, Austria-Hungary
- Died: November 7, 1969 (aged 60)
- Education: Politecnico di Milano
- Occupation: Architect

Ernesto Nathan Rogers (March 16, 1909 – November 7, 1969) was an Italian architect, writer and educator.

== Career ==
Rogers was born in Trieste, then in the Austro-Hungarian Empire, as a British citizen to Ida Manni and Romeo Rogers, of Jewish origin, the latter of whom worked for Assicurazioni Generali. The family relocated to Zurich in 1914 where Ernesto Rogers learned German. He graduated from the Politecnico di Milano, Italy in 1932. He was the uncle of English-Italian architect Richard Rogers.

Rogers, together with Gian Luigi Banfi, Lodovico Barbiano di Belgiojoso and Enrico Peressutti, in 1932 formed an architectural partnership in Milan, Italy named BBPR. With these partners, they engaged in a variety of activities, including writing, public speaking, and consulting in addition to their architectural pursuits.

In the interwar period Rogers distinguished himself from his partners through his work as journalist, critic and architectural publicist. He co-edited Quadrante from 1933 to 1936, and as a prolific writer, as well as architect, he was instrumental in the establishment of Italian rationalism (it: razionalismo).

During World War II, Rogers traveled to Switzerland, where he became acquainted with Vico Magistretti. On his return to Milan, he took on Domus as publisher–editor (1946–47), developing its international reputation as an architectural periodical. Rogers's major contribution to European architectural polemic, and the Italian neo-liberty debate in particular, was through his editorship of Casabella from 1953 to 1964.

Rogers lectured and taught widely, becoming a lecturer at the Politecnico di Milano in 1962 and a professor in 1964, a position he held until his death in 1969.
