= Lodovico Barbiano di Belgiojoso =

Italian architect and urban planner (1909–2004)

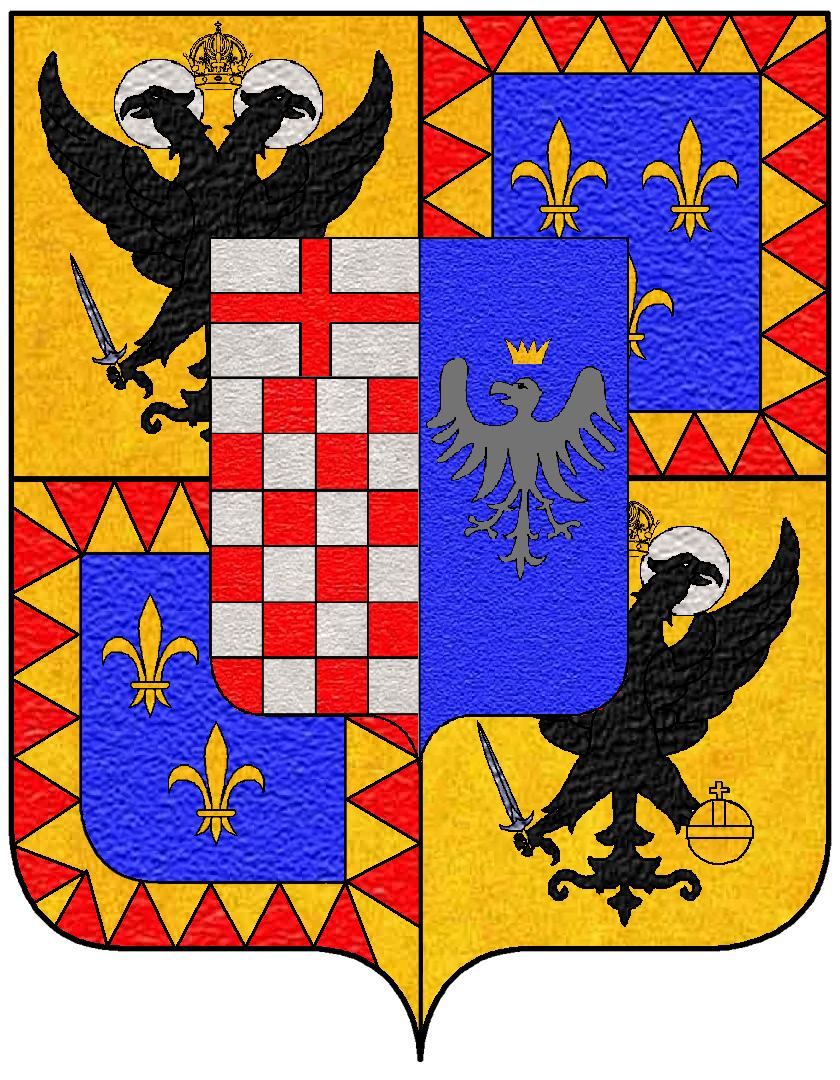
- Born: 1 December 1909; Milan, Kingdom of Italy
- Died: 10 April 2004 (aged 94); Milan, Italy
- Education: Polytechnic University of Milan
- Occupations: Architect, urban planner

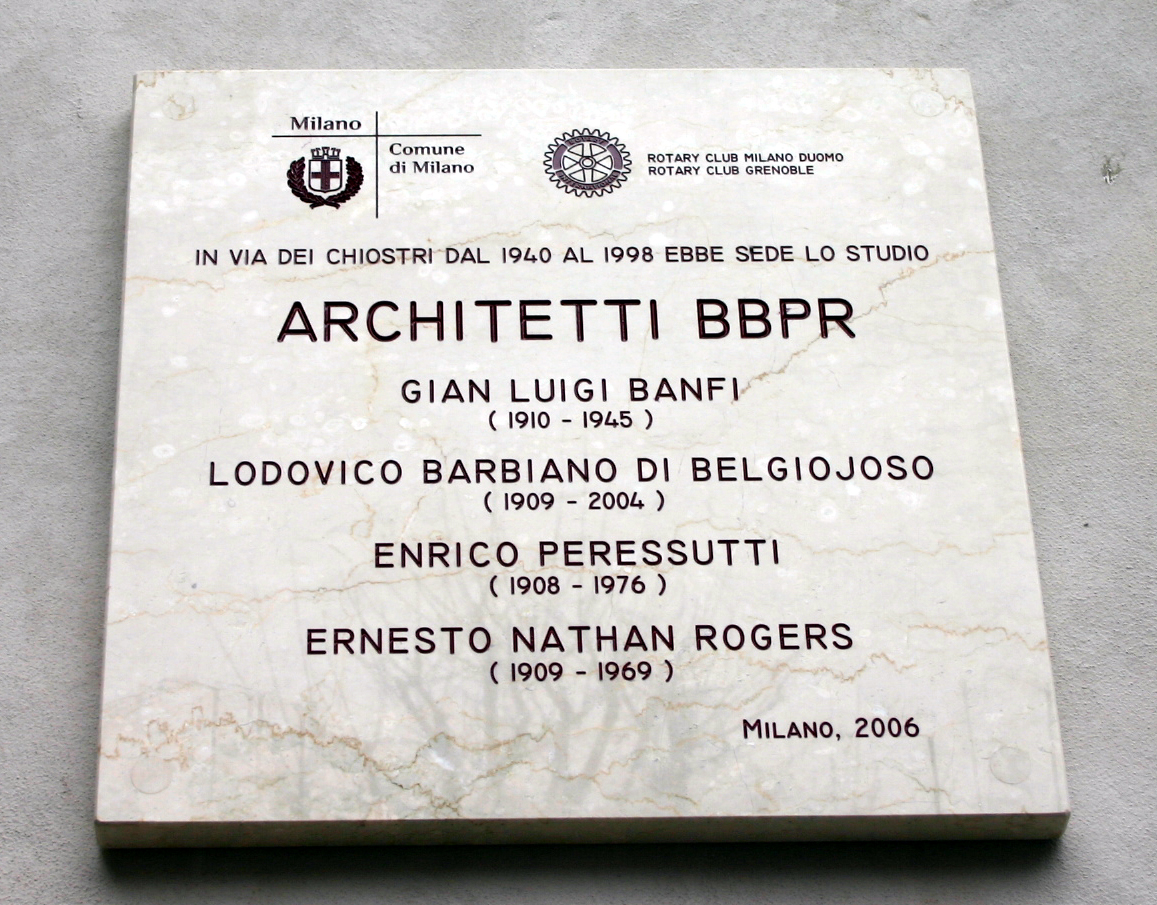

Lodovico Barbiano di Belgiojoso (1 December 1909 – 10 April 2004) was an Italian architect and urban planner. He was a founding member of the architectural practice BBPR, which became one of the most influential groups in Italian modern architecture.

== Life and career ==
Born in Milan into a noble family (he later became the 16th Count of Belgioioso) connected with art and architecture, Belgiojoso studied at the Polytechnic University of Milan, where he graduated in architecture in 1932 together with Gian Luigi Banfi, Enrico Peressutti and Ernesto Nathan Rogers. The four architects founded Studio BBPR, which became involved in the Italian Rationalist movement and participated in international architectural debates through the Congrès Internationaux d'Architecture Moderne (CIAM).

During the 1930s BBPR designed exhibition installations, residential buildings and urban projects, including the Casa del sabato per gli sposi for the Milan Triennial V (1933). Belgiojoso also collaborated with his father, architect Alberico.

During World War II he joined the Resistance movement and was arrested in 1944. He was deported to the Mauthausen concentration camp and survived imprisonment in the Gusen subcamp. After the war he documented his experience through writings and drawings and contributed to several memorial projects, including the Monument to the Deportees at the Monumental Cemetery of Milan (1946) and the Museo Monumento al Deportato in Carpi (1973).

After the war, BBPR resumed its architectural activity. Among their most notable works are the restoration of the Sforza Castle museums in Milan and the Torre Velasca (1958), considered a major example of post-war Italian architecture.

In his later career, Barbiano di Belgiojoso continued his professional activity together with his son Alberico, who joined the BBPR studio in 1963 and later became his associate. Together they focused mainly on urban renewal, restoration and large-scale public projects. Their work included the redevelopment of the Carmine district in Genoa, consultancy for the urban plan of Bergamo, studies for the reorganization of Kuwait City's central business district, and major architectural projects such as the University of Messina, the adaptation of Royal Palace in Milan as a museum, and the restoration of the cloisters of Sant'Eustorgio and the Milan Stock Exchange building.

Belgiojoso was also active in teaching and architectural criticism. He taught at the IUAV University of Venice and the Polytechnic University of Milan, and held several positions in professional and cultural institutions, including the presidency of the Lombardy section of the Istituto Nazionale di Urbanistica (INU). He was also a member of the Accademia di San Luca, the American Institute of Architects and the Royal Society of Arts in London. In 1993, he was awarded the Antonio Feltrinelli Prize by the Accademia Nazionale dei Lincei, and in 2002 he received the Gold Medal for Culture from the Presidency of the Italian Republic.

Lodovico Barbiano di Belgiojoso died in Milan on 10 April 2004.

== Sources ==
- Belgiojoso, Lodovico (1979). De Seta, Cesare (ed.). Intervista sul mestiere dell'architetto. Bari: Laterza.
- Bertelli, Guya; Ghiotti, Marco (2013). Lodovico Belgiojoso Architetto 1909–2004. Atti del Convegno di studi. Milan: Skira.
- Bonfanti, Ezio; Porta, Maurizio (1973). Città, museo e architettura. Il gruppo BBPR nella cultura architettonica italiana 1932–1970. Florence: Vallecchi.
- Lanzarini, Orietta (2015). "Barbiano di Belgiojoso, Lodovico". Dizionario Biografico degli Italiani. Istituto dell'Enciclopedia Italiana.
- Maffioletti, Serena (1994). BBPR. Bologna: Edizioni C.I.P.I.A.
