= Enrico Agostino Griffini =

Italian architect and engineer (1887–1952)

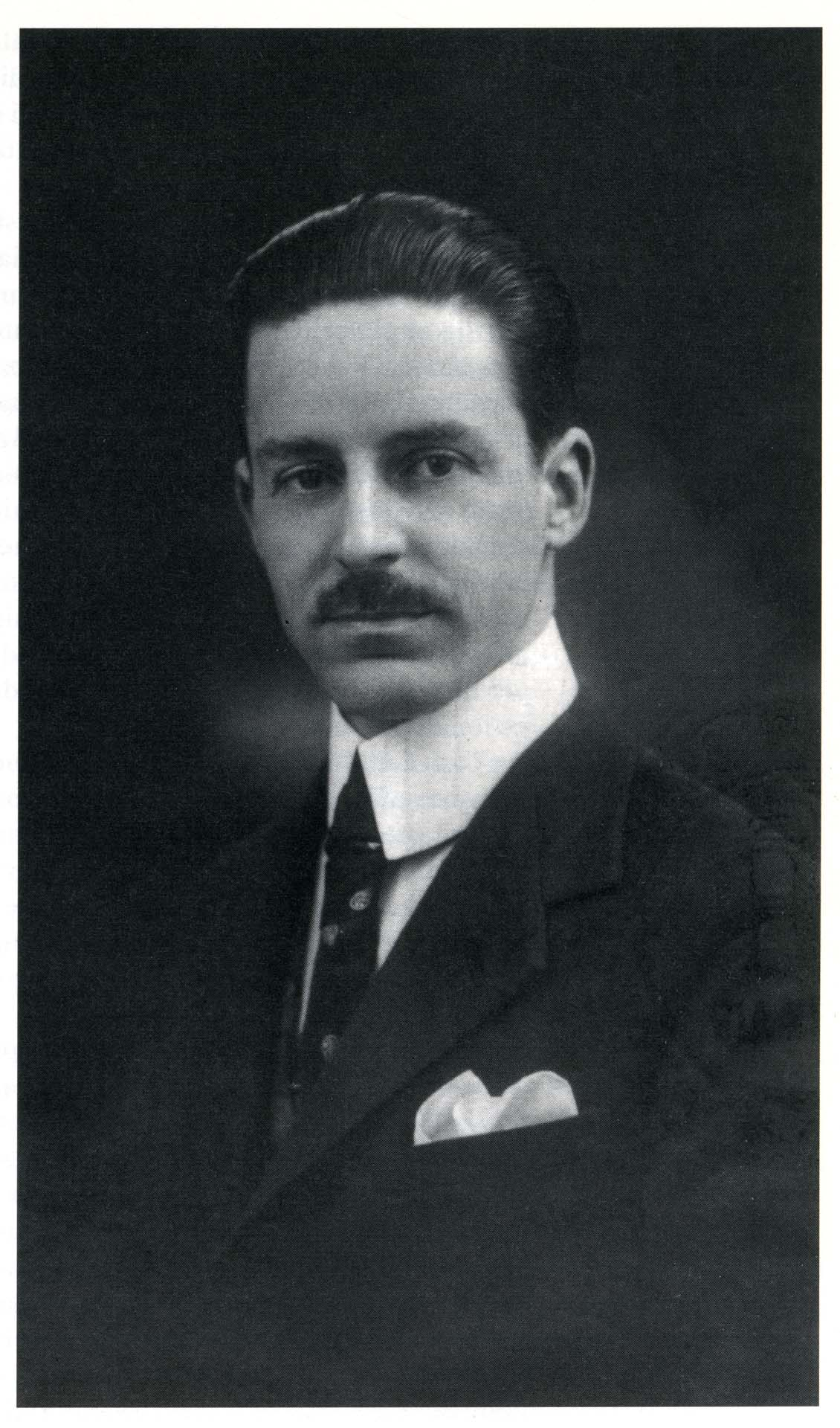
- Born: 19 August 1887; Venice, Kingdom of Italy
- Died: 22 August 1952 (aged 65); Milan, Italy
- Education: Polytechnic University of Milan
- Occupations: Architect, engineer

Enrico Agostino Griffini (19 August 1887 – 22 August 1952) was an Italian architect and engineer, considered one of the pioneers of Italian Rationalism. He worked mainly in Milan, where he contributed to the development of modern architecture during the interwar period.

Griffini graduated in industrial electrical engineering from the Polytechnic University of Milan in 1910. After visiting the Weissenhof Estate in Stuttgart in 1927, he became interested in modern architectural movements and later joined the Movimento Italiano per l'Architettura Razionale (MIAR), becoming associated with the Italian rationalist movement.

Among his works are the reconstruction of the upper church of Santa Maria della Fontana in Milan (1922), with Paolo Mezzanotte, the Institute for Abandoned Children in Lodi (1933), with Eugenio Faludi, the Porcile family funerary chapel at the Monumental Cemetery of Milan (1934), the Palazzo dell'Arengario (1936), with Piero Portaluppi, Giovanni Muzio and Pier Giulio Magistretti, and service stations designed with Mario Cereghini.

Griffini died in Milan in 1952.
