= Palazzo della Banca Popolare di Milano =

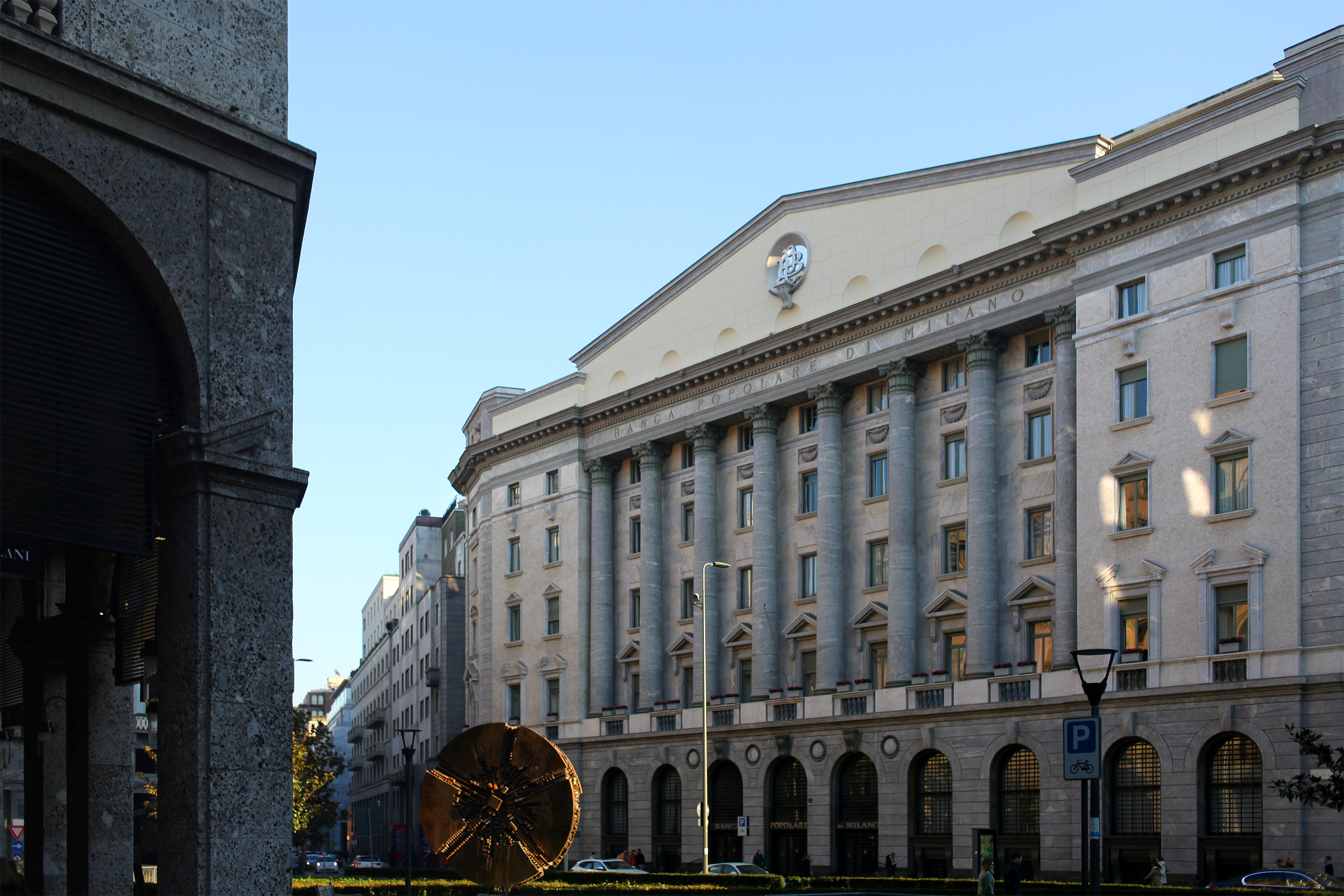
- Palazzo della Banca Popolare di Milano in 2020
- Click on the map for a fullscreen view

General information
- Location: Milan, Italy
- Coordinates: 45°27′59.44″N 9°11′37.05″E

Palazzo della Banca Popolare di Milano is a historic building located in Milan, Italy.

== History ==
The building, designed by architect Giovanni Greppi, was built between 1928 and 1930 as the new headquarters of Banca Popolare di Milano (BPM).

Following the merger between BPM and Banco Popolare, the building became the registered headquarters of the newly formed entity, Banco BPM.

== Description ==
The building is located Piazza Filippo Meda in Milan's CBD, opposite Palazzo Bolchini.

It features a monumental classical style. The façade is dominated by eight columns of colossal order supporting a triangular pediment. The building develops around a large central glass-covered courtyard.
