= Galleria del Corso =

Commercial arcade in Milan

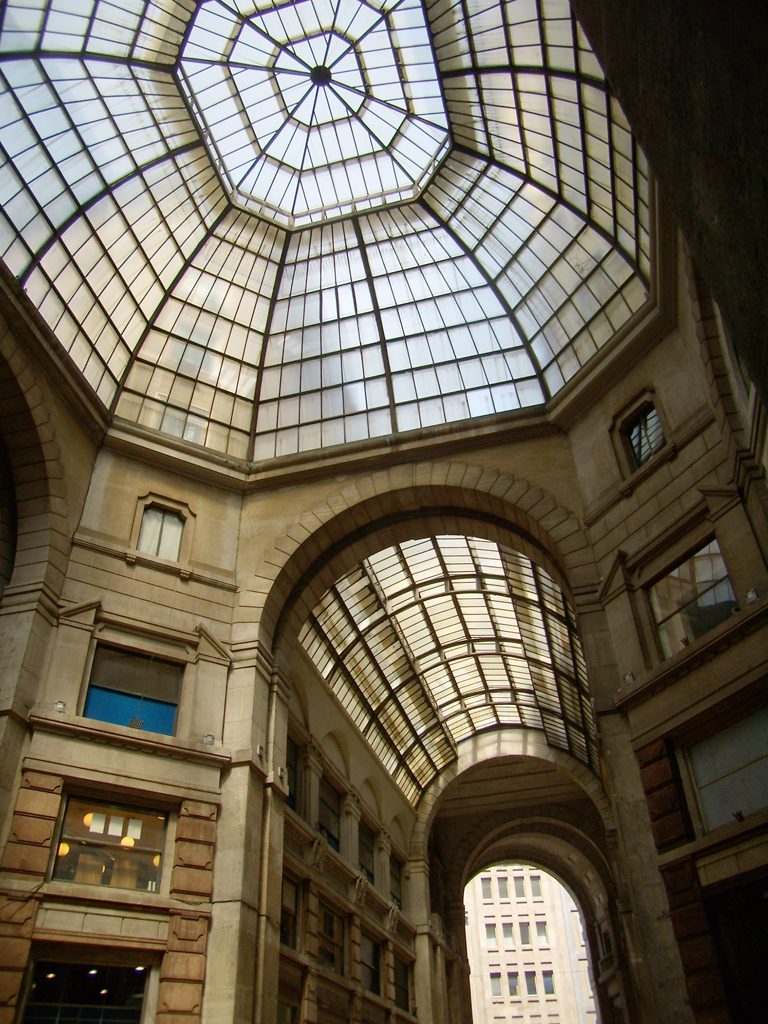
- Interactive map of the Galleria del Corso area

General information
- Type: Shopping center
- Architectural style: Neoclassical
- Location: Corso Vittorio Emanuele II, Piazza Cesare Beccaria, Milan, Lombardia, Italy
- Coordinates: 45°27′53″N 9°11′42″E
- Completed: 1926, 1931

Design and construction
- Architects: Mario Beretta, Ugo Patetta & Livio Cossutti, Eugenio Faludi, Pier Giulio Magistretti

The Galleria del Corso is a major shopping arcade in the historic center (Zone 1) of Milan, Italy, one of five built in the city in the interwar period (1919–1939), along with the Galleria del Toro, Galleria Mazzini, Galleria Meravigli and the Galleria Gonzaga.

== History ==
The first idea of building an arcade to connect the Corso Vittorio Emmanuele II to the Piazza Cesare Beccaria dates back to before World War I; the initial objective was to create—like other arcades conceived at the time—a covered connection between the street and the square, with a central octagon and a curved branch in the direction of Via Cesare Beccaria.

However, the general project designed between 1915 and 1918 by Mario Beretta was extensively modified during construction. In fact, the construction began many years later, in 1923, and was completed in stages, under the guidance of different architects. Beretta himself built, in 1923, only the Cinema Corso (with 2000 seats between the seats and the gallery), inaugurated on 3 December 1926 in place of the Provisional Cinema already built within the perimeter walls of the Galleria, with the building above already eight floors tall.

The west side was built by Ugo Patetta and Livio Cossutti beginning in 1928 to plans which contained alterations to the original project. By modifying the façade on the street and the recovering space from the Salone Concerto Varietà San Martino, the two architects added the Excelsior Theater. In 1931 this space became the Cinema Teatro, a futuristic structure with a stage with movable floors (the first ever in Italy) which made it possible to modify the spaces.

This modification was only the first of a series that transformed the structure completely from the original design. The construction of the portion on Via Cesare Beccaria was carried out by the Hungarian architect of Italian origin Eugenio Faludi, also the designer of some pavilions of the Milan Trade Fair (SNIA Viscosa and Italviscosa), while Pier Giulio Magistretti was responsible for the construction of the facades facing the Piazza Cesare Beccaria, on which stood the Cinema San Carlo, designed by Mario Ridolfi and later renamed the Cinema Ambasciatori.

Since 2011, the Gallery has been partially restored and refurbished with a hotel and a shopping center inside.

== Activities at the Galleria ==
Although it was initially criticized for its appearance, which was considered squat and clumsy, the Galleria del Corso soon acquired notoriety as a popular place, famous both for afternoon and daytime strolls, and for catering and evening entertainment.

=== Cinemas ===
Over the years the area has hosted numerous bars, restaurants, shops and several cinemas, some of which were inaugurated long after the opening of the Galleria thanks to the possibility, granted by the provincial commission of the Prefecture of Milan in 1945, to open rooms also underground.

- Corso, at number 22 (closed January 28, 2001)
- Excelsior (closed in 2007)
- San Carlo - Ambasciatori (from 1936 until 29 July 2001)
- Ariston, at number 1 (from 1947 to end of 2000)
- Mignon (from 1947 until 2007)
- Nuovo Mediolanum, designed by Lodovico Barbiano di Belgiojoso as part of a general redevelopment of the area by the famed architecture firm BBPR (from October 1971 until 2005)
- Pasquirolo, at number 28 Corso Vittorio Emanuele II (from 1975 until 2006), next to the Galleria

=== Music Industry ===
Thanks to the almost constant presence of the offices of various record publishers, in particular Sugar Music, the Gallery has become a hub for established musicians and others looking for work in the music industry. Numbers 2 and 4 are known for having hosted the legal and administrative offices of Italian music publishing houses from the post-war period to the 1990s, both music publishers, or companies that manage the legal rights of lyrics and music for musical pieces, and record labels, which instead produce new music.

At number 4, among the various musical editions we remember the Tiber Music Editions, the Tevere, the Italian Spanka, the Song Music House (Sonzogno Publishing Group), the Francis-Day Musical Editions, D'Anzi Editore, the Leon Music Editions, the Edizioni Luisiana, Edizioni Leonardi, the Ivana srl, the Messaggerie Musicali, Settebello, the Top Records, the Edizioni Suvini Zerboni, the Mascheroni sa, the Edizioni Alfa, the Edizioni Italian Yank, the Bridge, the Melodi, the Music Union, Modulo Uno, Edizioni Curci (which over the years created and distributed the Accordo, Asso and Cervino Editions) and the homonymous Galleria del Corso. Among the various record labels, Sugar Music stands out in particular, who left Galleria del Corso in 1974 to settle inside the then new facility of the record company CGD.

At number 2 there were, among others, the Kramer, the Edizioni Musicali Riunite and the Ariston Publishing Group. Following the profound transformations of the music market, to date very few of these historic businesses have remained operational, and many offices have been replaced by other businesses.

=== Redevelopment ===
The alternation of commercial activities in the Galleria testified to the changes in society and in consumption that took place in Italy throughout much of the last century. All the cinemas shut down, one after the other, a common trend for the entire city of Milan, as well as various well-known clothing shops and restaurants. This continued up to the 2000s, causing a general desertification of the area.

The managers of the Galleria have launched a plan for a profound transformation of the interior spaces with a series of renovations that started in 2011.

== Image Gallery ==
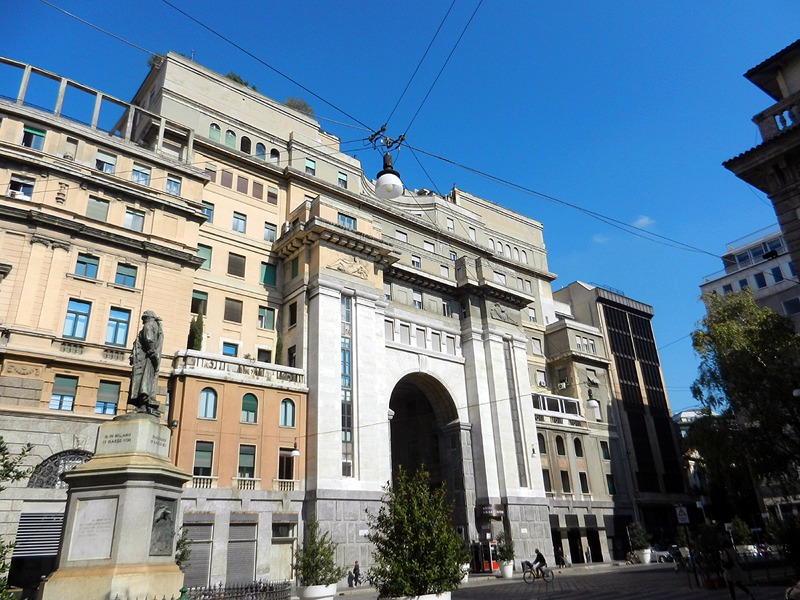
Entrance on the Piazza Beccaria

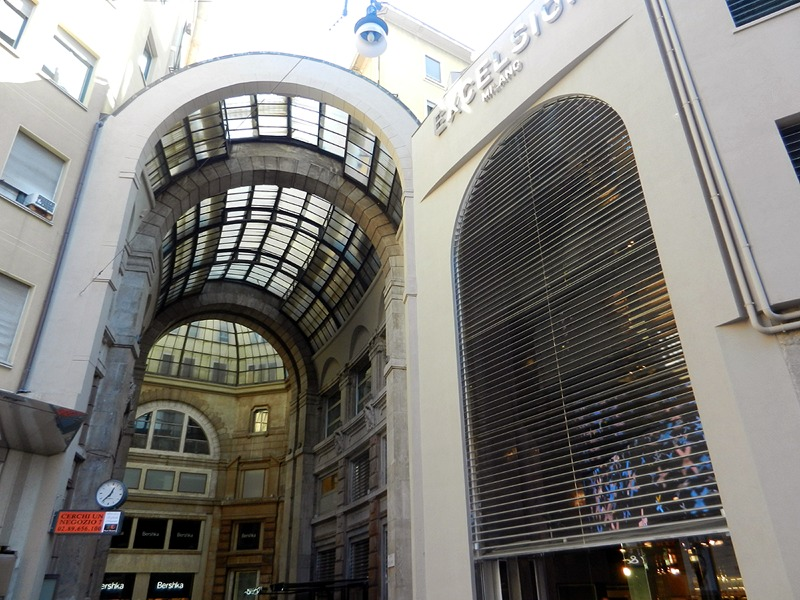
Entrance on the Via della Passarella

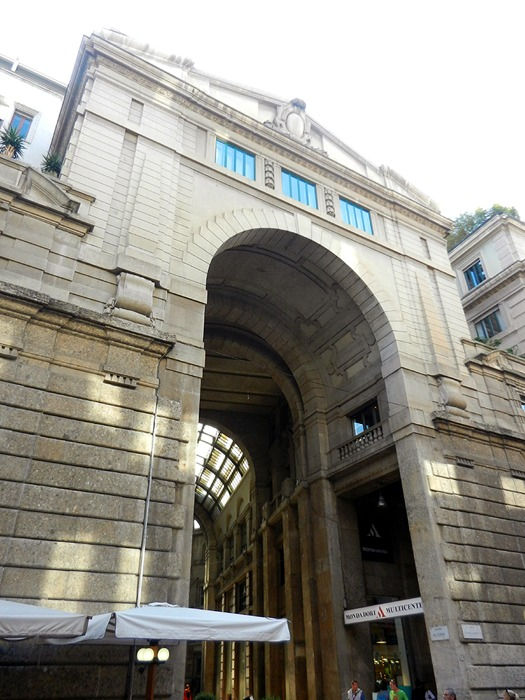
Entrance on the Corso Vittorio Emanuele II

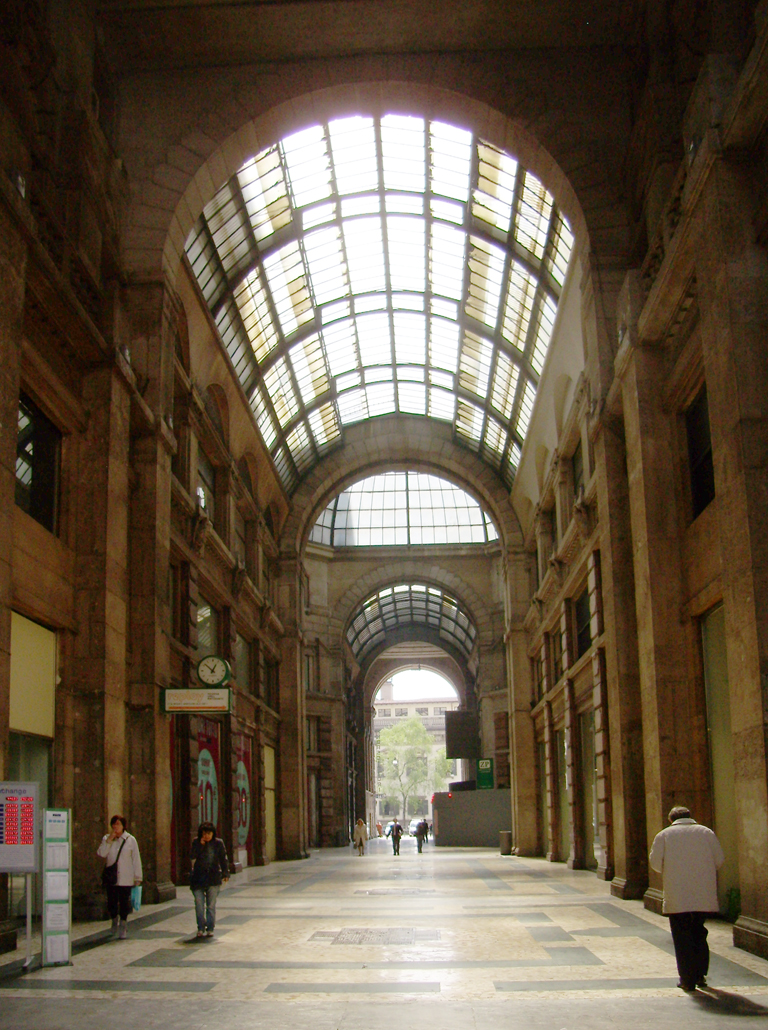
Interior

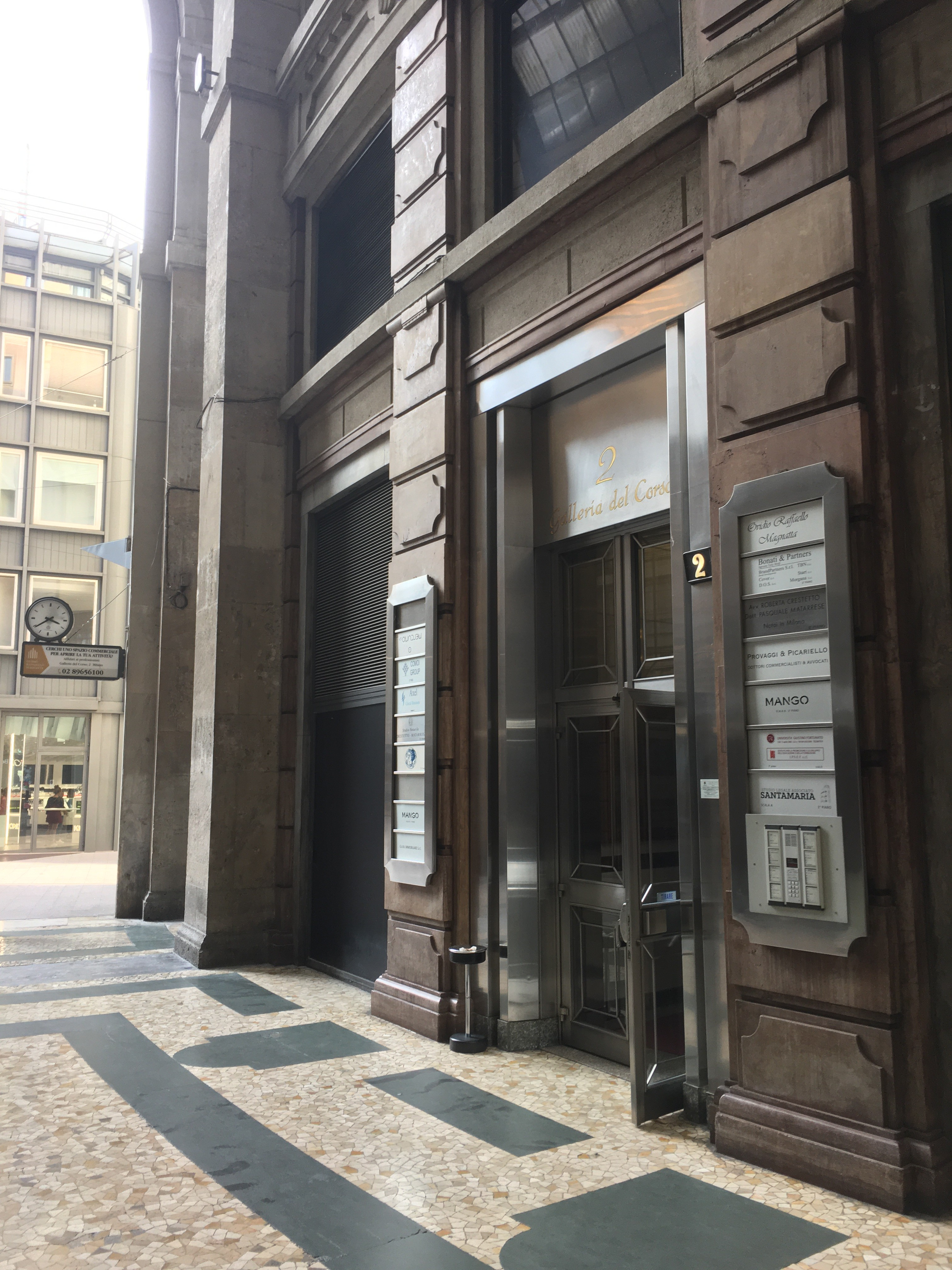
Entrance to number 2 (former home of a music publisher)

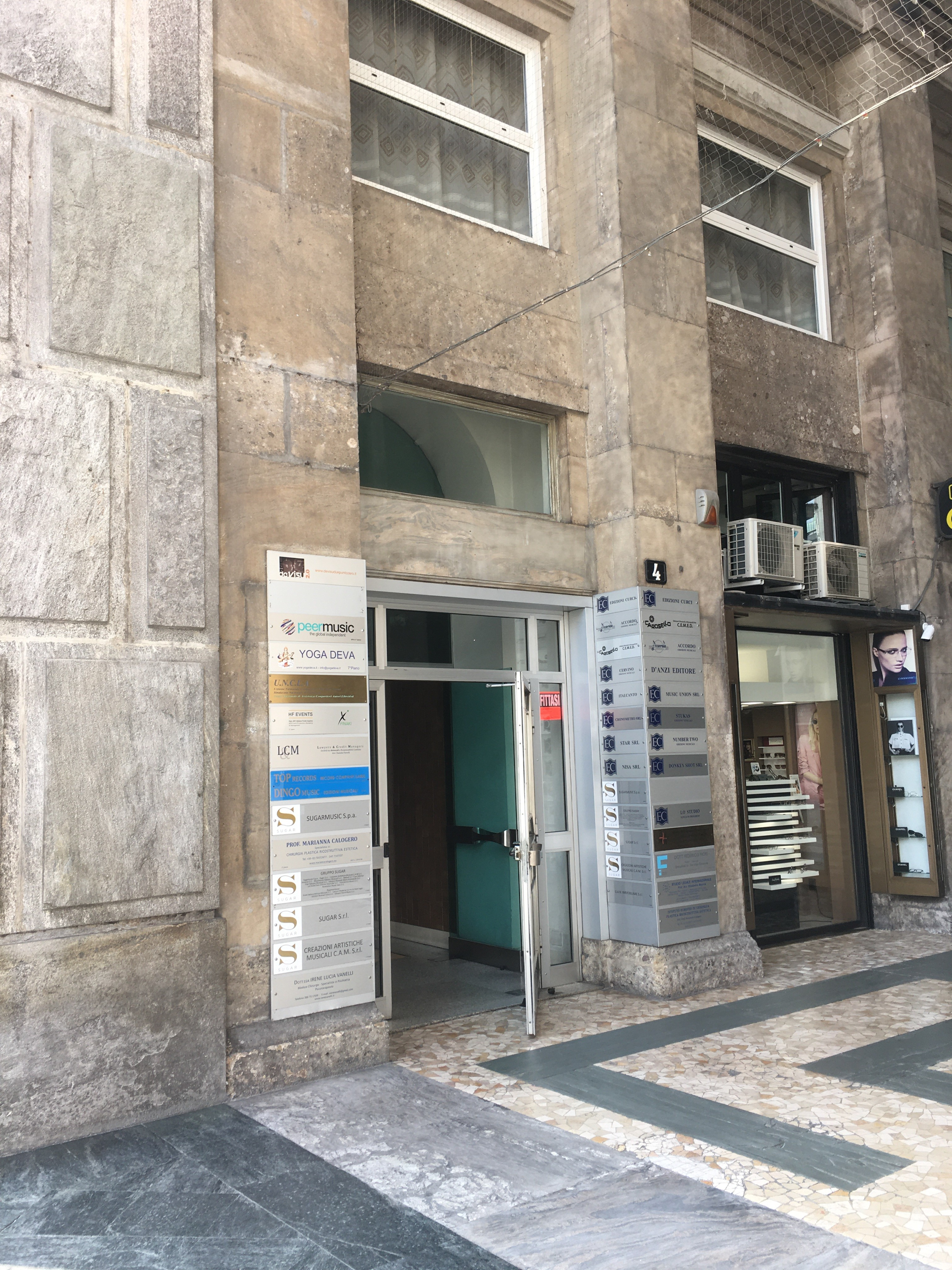
Entrance to number 4 (former home of a music publisher)
