= Museo del Novecento =

Museum of 20th-century art in Milan

Coordinates: 45°27′49″N 9°11′25″E

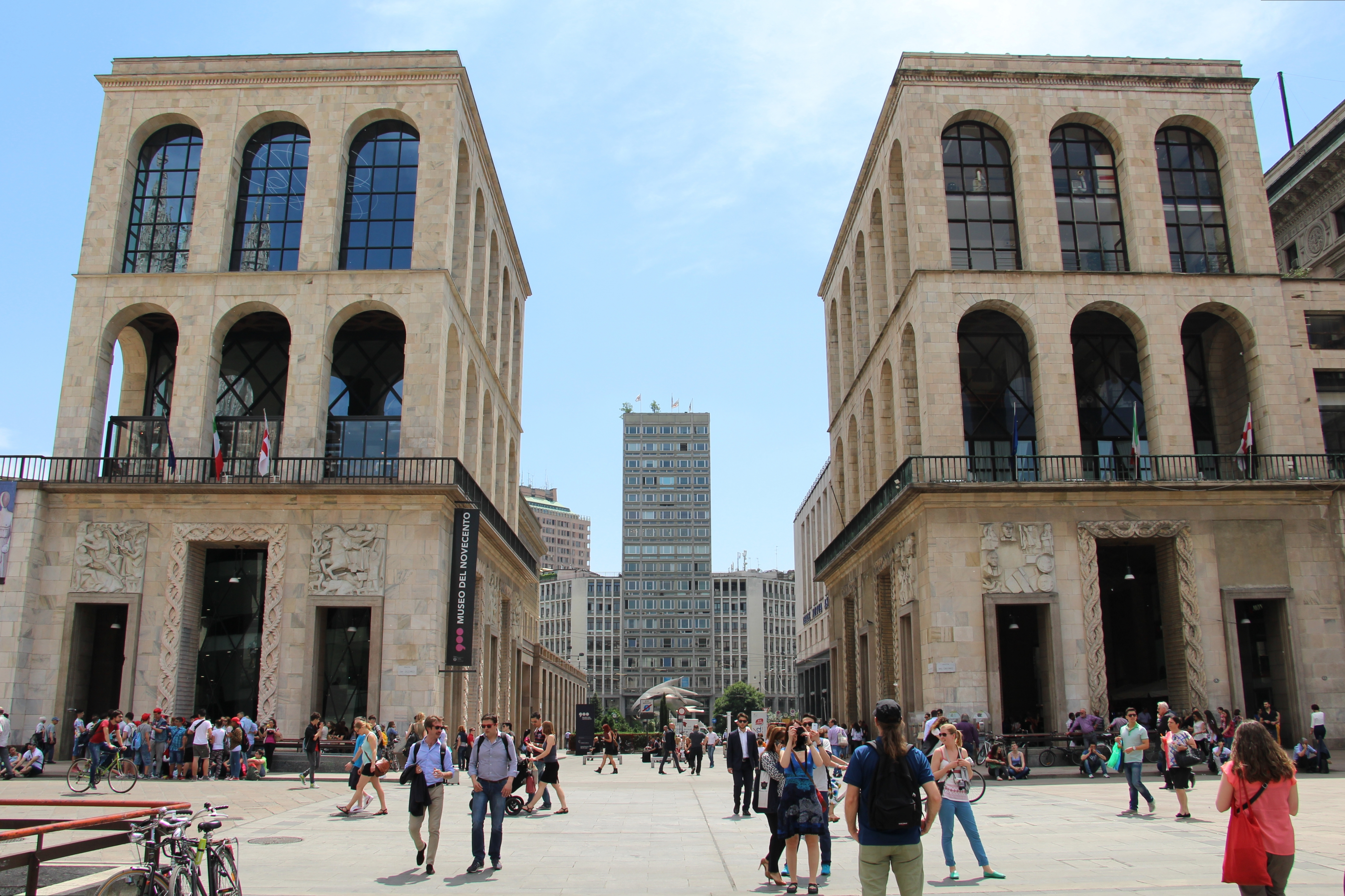
- Established: 6 December 2010
- Location: Palazzo dell'Arengario, Piazza del Duomo, Milan, Italy
- Collections: Twentieth-century art
- Director: Gianfranco Maraniello
- Curators: Danka Giacon, Iolanda Ratti
- Website: www.museodelnovecento.org

The Museo del Novecento ("museum of the twentieth century") is a museum of twentieth-century art in Milan, in Lombardy in northern Italy. It is housed in the Palazzo dell'Arengario, near Piazza del Duomo in the centre of the city.

The museum opened on 6 December 2010. It displays about 400 works, most of them Italian, from the twentieth century.

== Collection ==
Apart from a single room housing works by foreign artists including Braque, Kandinsky, Klee, Léger, Matisse, Mondrian and Picasso, the majority of the works exhibited in the museum are by Italian artists. A significant section highlights Italian Futurists, showcasing works by Giacomo Balla, Umberto Boccioni, Carlo Carrà, Fortunato Depero, Luigi Russolo, Gino Severini, Mario Sironi and Ardengo Soffici. Giuseppe Pellizza da Volpedo's large canvas Il Quarto Stato (1902) was exhibited in a room on its own, until 2022.

Other sections of the museum are dedicated to individual artists such as Giorgio de Chirico, Lucio Fontana and Morandi. There are also sections devoted to art movements of the twentieth century, including Abstractionism, Arte Povera, the Novecento Italiano, Post-Impressionism and Realism, and to genres such as landscape and monumental art.

In 2015 the museum received a large donation from private collectors Bianca and Mario Bertolini of contemporary art works by artists such as Daniel Buren, Joseph Kosuth, Roy Lichtenstein, Robert Rauschenberg, Frank Stella and Andy Warhol.

== Facilities ==
The museum has a bookshop, and a restaurant-bar on the top floor, overlooking Piazza del Duomo.
