= Vico Magistretti =

Italian industrial designer and architect (1920–2006)

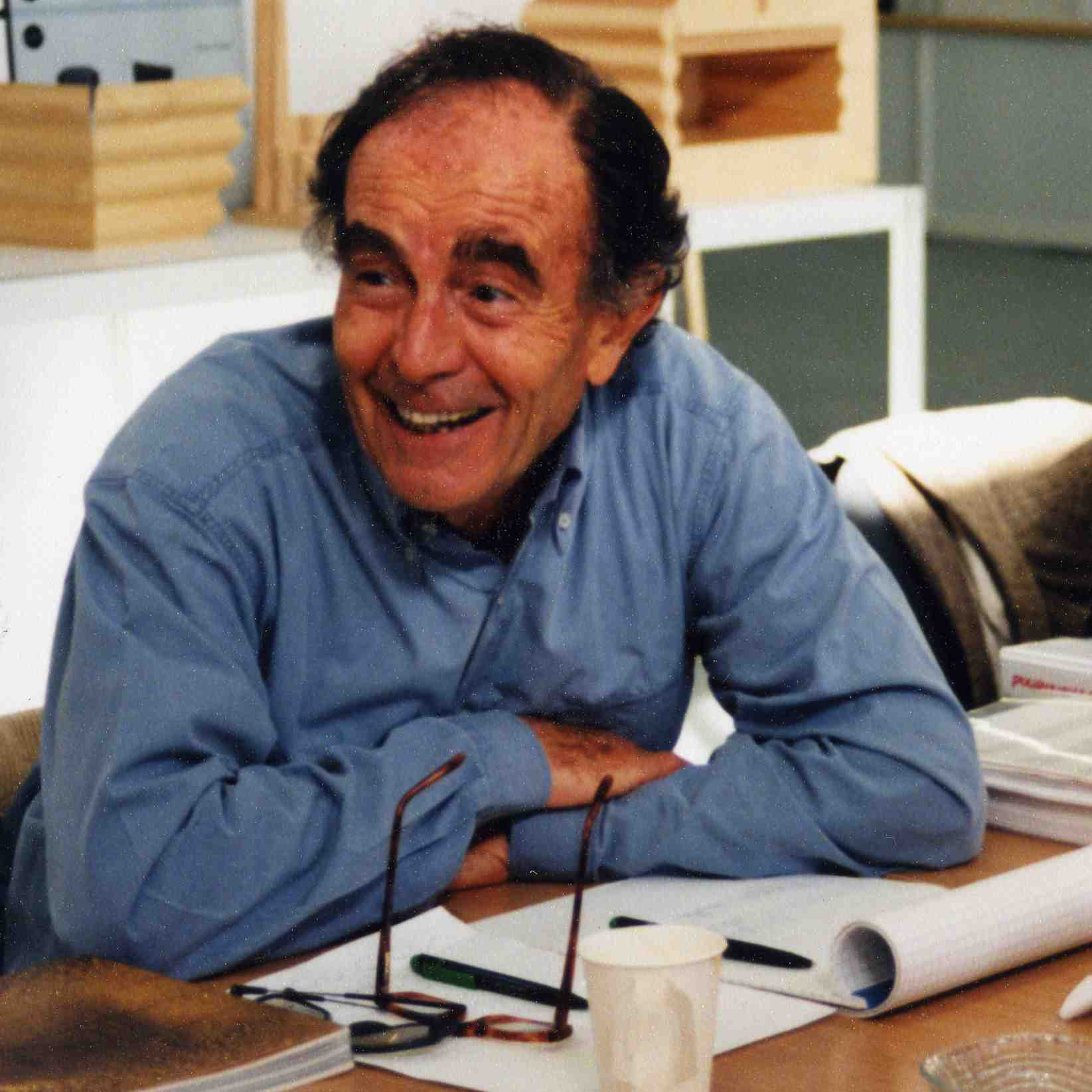
- Born: October 6, 1920
- Died: September 19, 2006 (aged 85)
- Education: Politecnico di Milano
- Occupation: Architect
- Awards: Gold Medal at the 1951 Triennale, Grand Prix at the 1954 Triennale, two Compasso d'Oro awards in 1967 and 1979, the Gold Medal of the Chartered Society of Industrial Artists & Designers in 1986
- Practice: Design and architecture
- Buildings: QT8 Church

Vico Magistretti (October 6, 1920 – September 19, 2006) was an Italian architect, who was also active as an industrial designer, furniture designer, and academic. As a collaborator of humanist architect Ernesto Nathan Rogers, one of Magistretti's first projects was the "poetic" round church in the experimental Milan neighborhood of QT8. He later designed mass-produced appliances and furniture for companies such as Cassina S.p.A., Artemide, and Oluce. These designs won several awards, including the Compasso d'Oro, and the Minerva Medal in 1986.

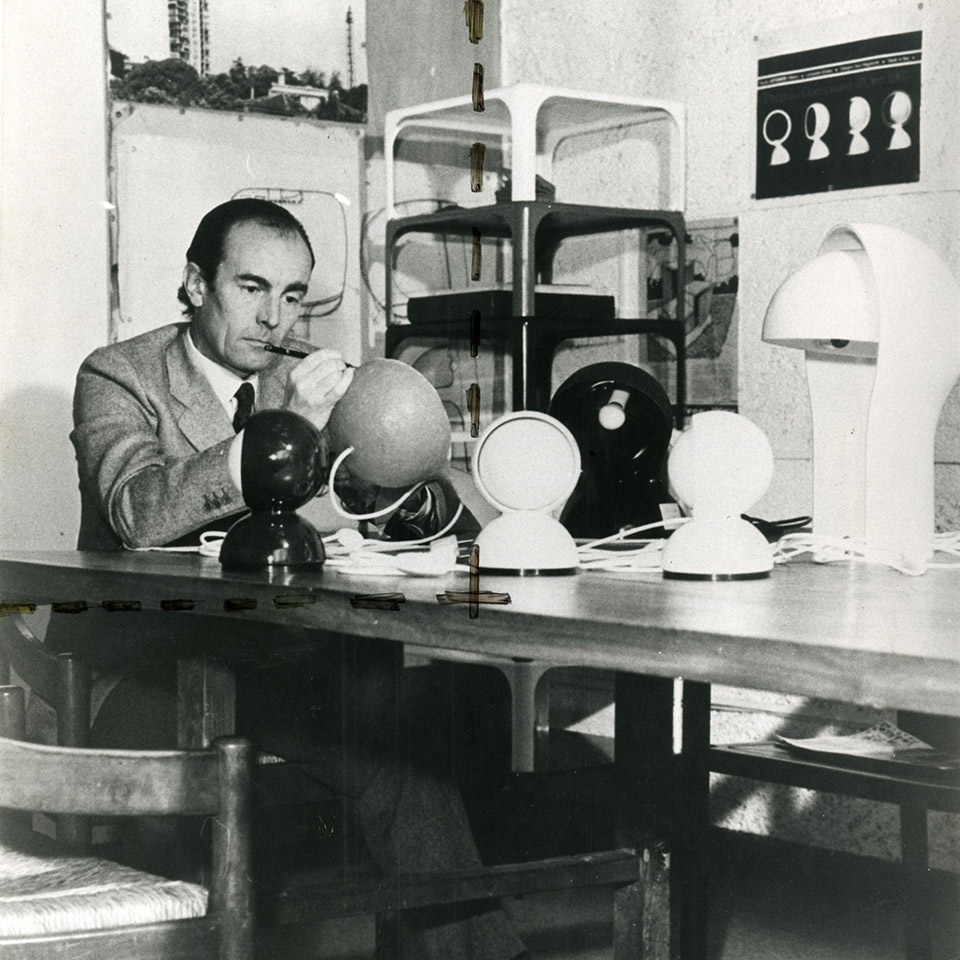
Vico Magistretti with various lamp prototypes

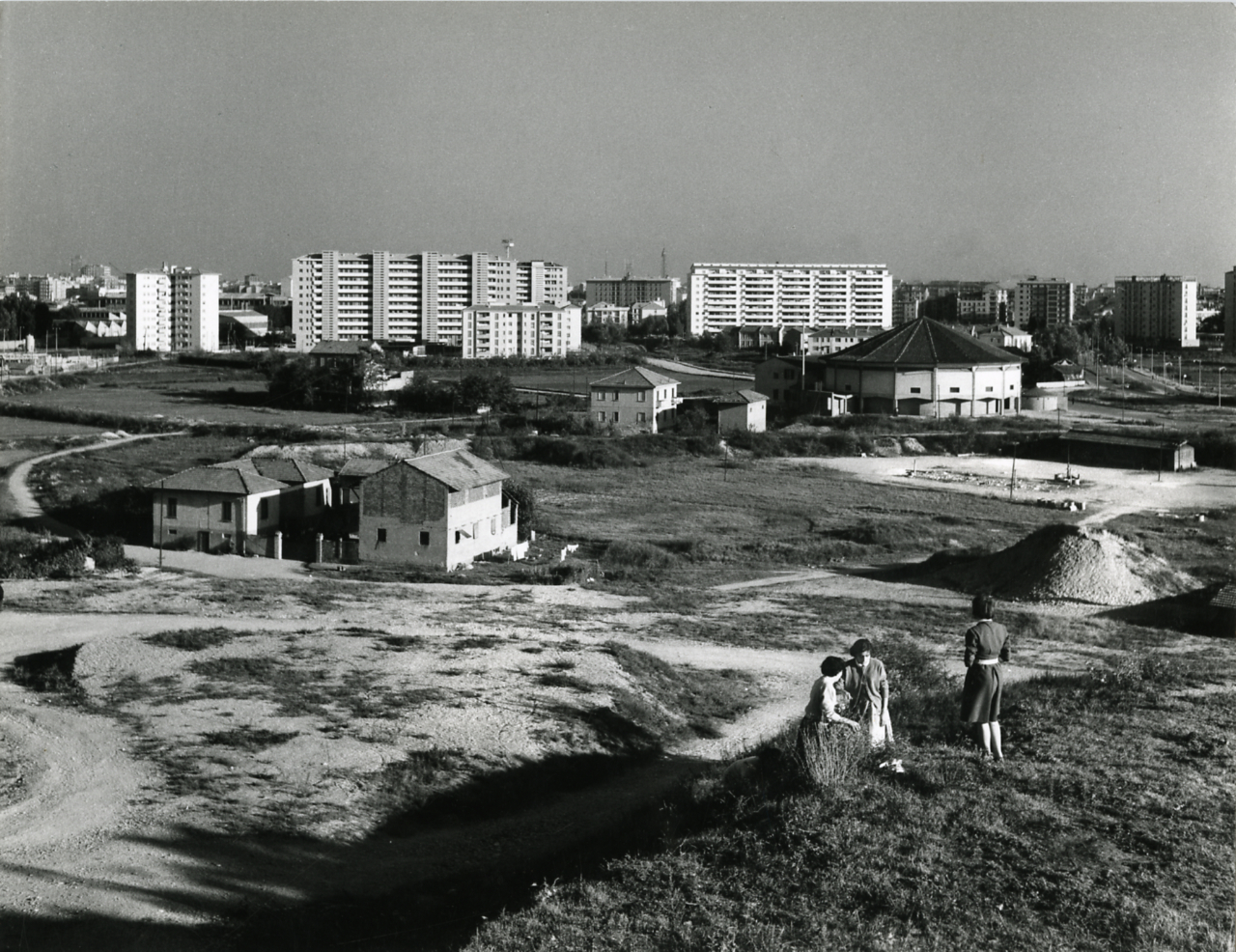
Archive photo of Milan's Quartiere Triennale 8 district showing newly constructed housing and the Santa Maria Nascente church by Vico Magistretti and Mario Tedeschi (Paolo Monti photograph, 1960)

== Early life and education ==
Vico Magistretti was born the son of architect Pier Giulio on 6 October 1920, in Milan, Italy. During the Second World War, to avoid being deported to Germany, he left Italy for Switzerland on September 8, 1943, during his military service. While in the country, he taught at and took courses at the Champ Universitaire Italien in Lausanne. He returned to Milan in 1945, graduating the same year from the Politecnico di Milano.

While in Switzerland, he met Ernesto Nathan Rogers. According to The Guardian,

"He soon came under the influence of the architect Ernesto Nathan Rogers, whose humanist ideas for the reconstruction of postwar Italy inspired a whole series of intellectuals. At that time Magistretti took part in work on the extraordinary experimental neighborhood on the edge of Milan known as QT8, where a group of architects and planners were given complete freedom. Magistretti built its "poetic round church" Santa Maria Nascente."

== Work and career ==
After graduation, he worked at his fathers firm with the architect Paolo Chessa.

He initially worked in urban design in Milan. In the 1950s he moved into the field of mass-produced furniture and lamps, some of which became museum pieces later on. Among others, he worked for Artemide, Cassina, De Padova, Flou, Fritz Hansen, Kartell, and Schiffini.

According to The Guardian,

"His first great success came with the world famous Carimate chair produced by the Cassina company. The chair was a bestseller for years and mixed rural simplicity (the straw of the seat) with urban sophistication. There were the smooth lines of the wooden supports and legs, the colour, the pop-art bright red frame and elements of Scandinavian design."

== Awards ==
Vico Magistretti received several awards, among which are the gold medal at the 1951 Triennale, the Grand Prix at the 1954 Triennale, two Compasso d'Oro in 1967 and 1979, as well as the Gold Medal of the Chartered Society of Industrial Artists & Designers in 1986.

Year	Award	Nominated work	Category	Result
1951	Triennale	Magistretti		Gold Medal
1954	Triennale	Magistretti		Grand Prix
1967	Compasso d'Oro	Magistretti		Won
1979	Compasso d'Oro	Magistretti		Won
1986	Chartered Society of Industrial Artists & Designers	Magistretti		Gold Medal

== Affiliations and fellowships ==
He taught at the Royal College of Art (RCA) in London for 20 years and was appointed a Royal Designer for Industry (RDI). He also taught at Domus Academy in Milan and was an honorary member of the Royal Scottish Incorporation of Architects.

== Influence and legacy ==
Magistretti's work has been widely exhibited and is held in the collections of many museums, including the Pompidou Centre in Paris, the Museum of Modern Art and Metropolitan Museum in New York, the Philadelphia Museum of Art, Art Institute of Chicago, and the ADI Design Museum in Milan.

In 2021, to celebrate the centenary of Magistretti's birth, the Palazzo dell'Arte of the Triennale in Milan staged an exhibition of his life's work.

The designer Jasper Morrison, a former student of Magistretti's at the Royal College of Art, remembered a conversation with Magistretti about the practice of industrial design:

"We met at Linate [airport], we were getting on the plane to London, he was 75 years old, I was 35, and he told me: "We are the luckiest people in the world to do this job". That phrase echoed in me, I was already so disappointed at the beginning of my career, but he was retired and full of enthusiasm".

Magistretti's wife, Paola, died in 1998. He died on September 19, 2006, and is survived by a son, Stefano, and a daughter, Susanna. His legacy is overseen by the Vico Magistretti Foundation.

== Gallery ==
Furniture and lighting by Magistretti

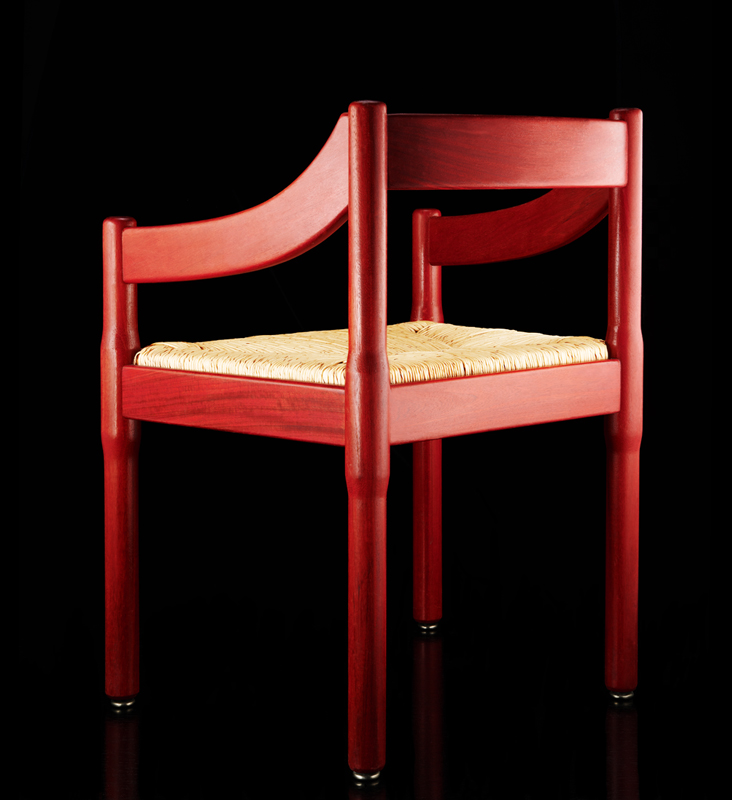
Cassina Carimate chair, back view (1959)

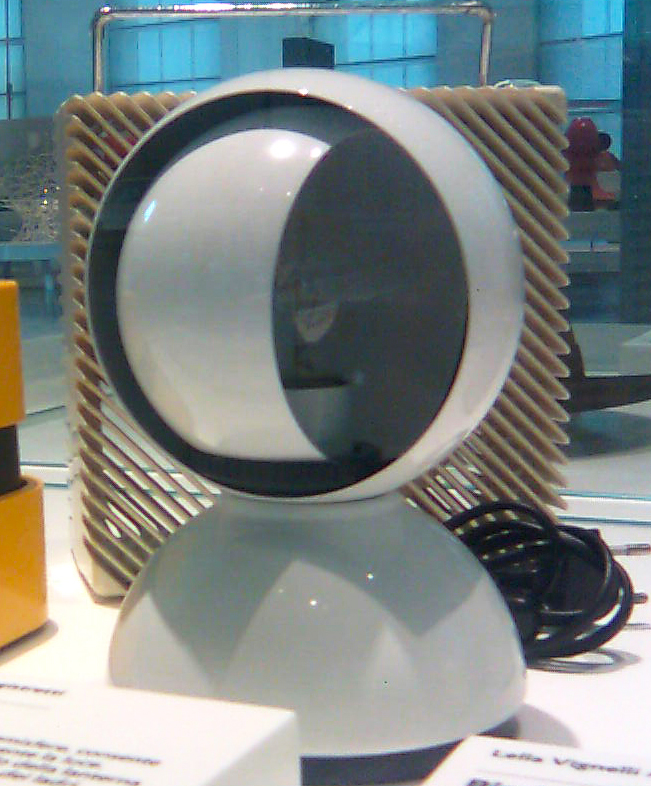
Artemide Eclisse lamp (1965)

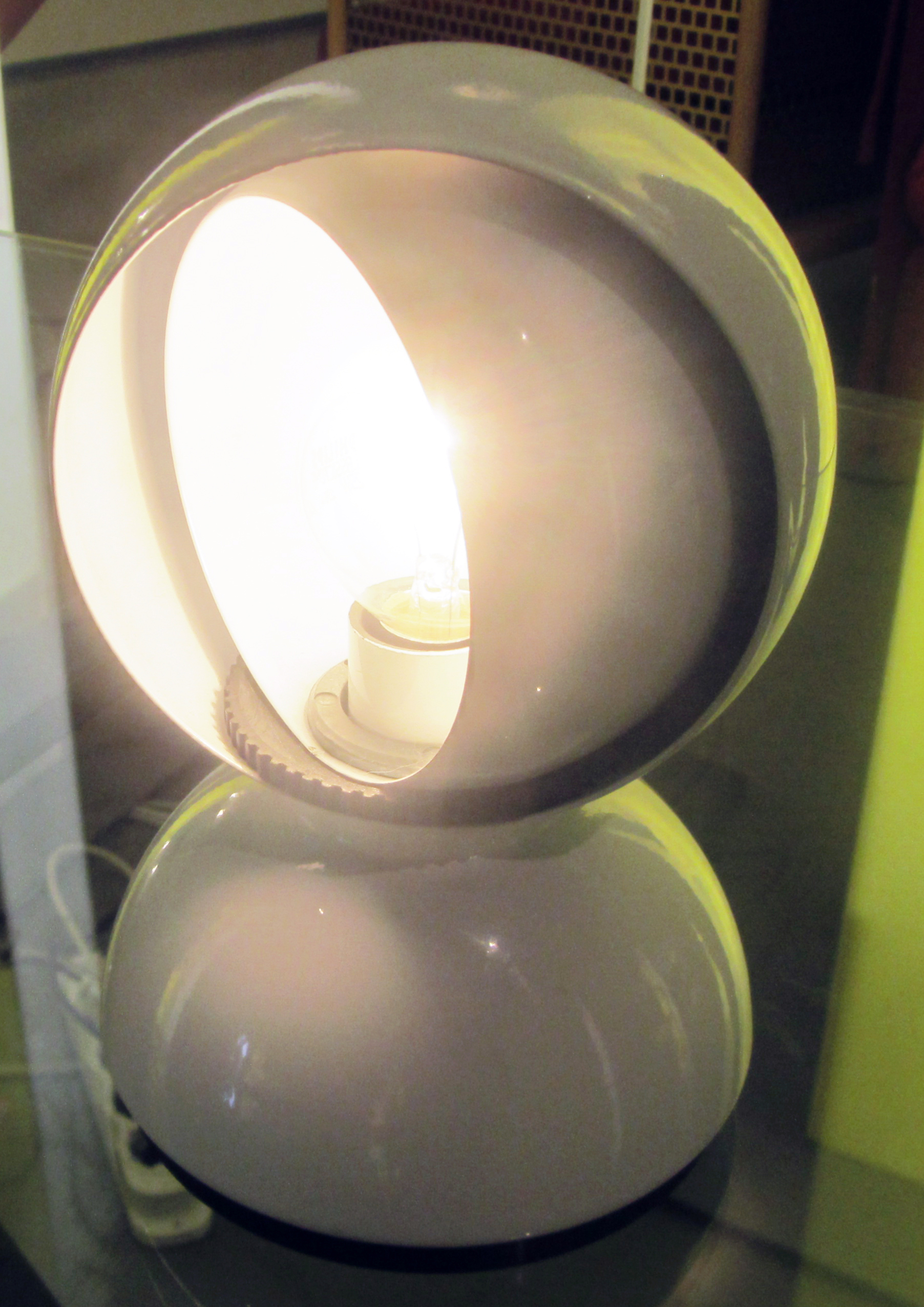
Eclisse lamp

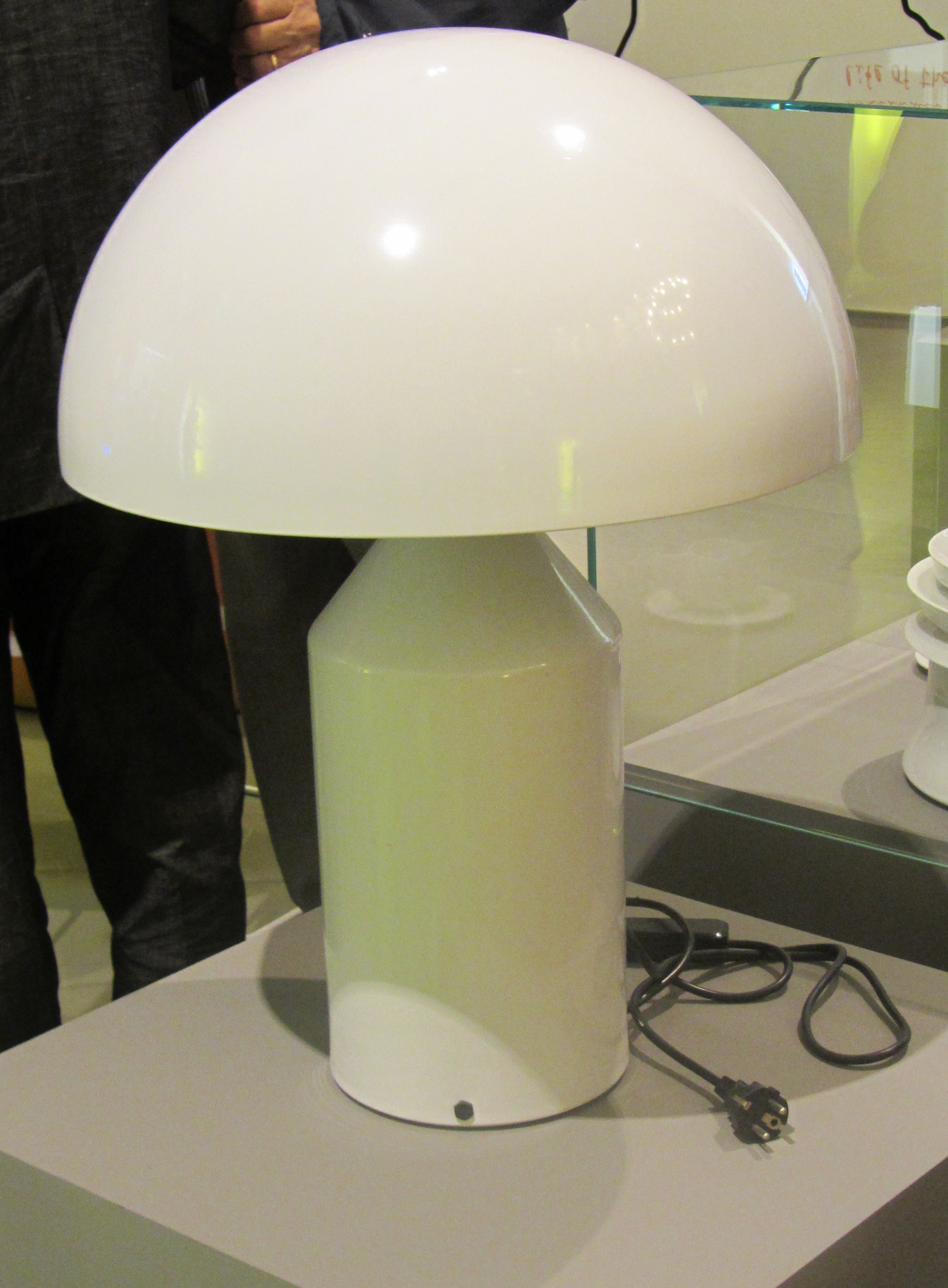
Oluce Atollo lamp (1977)

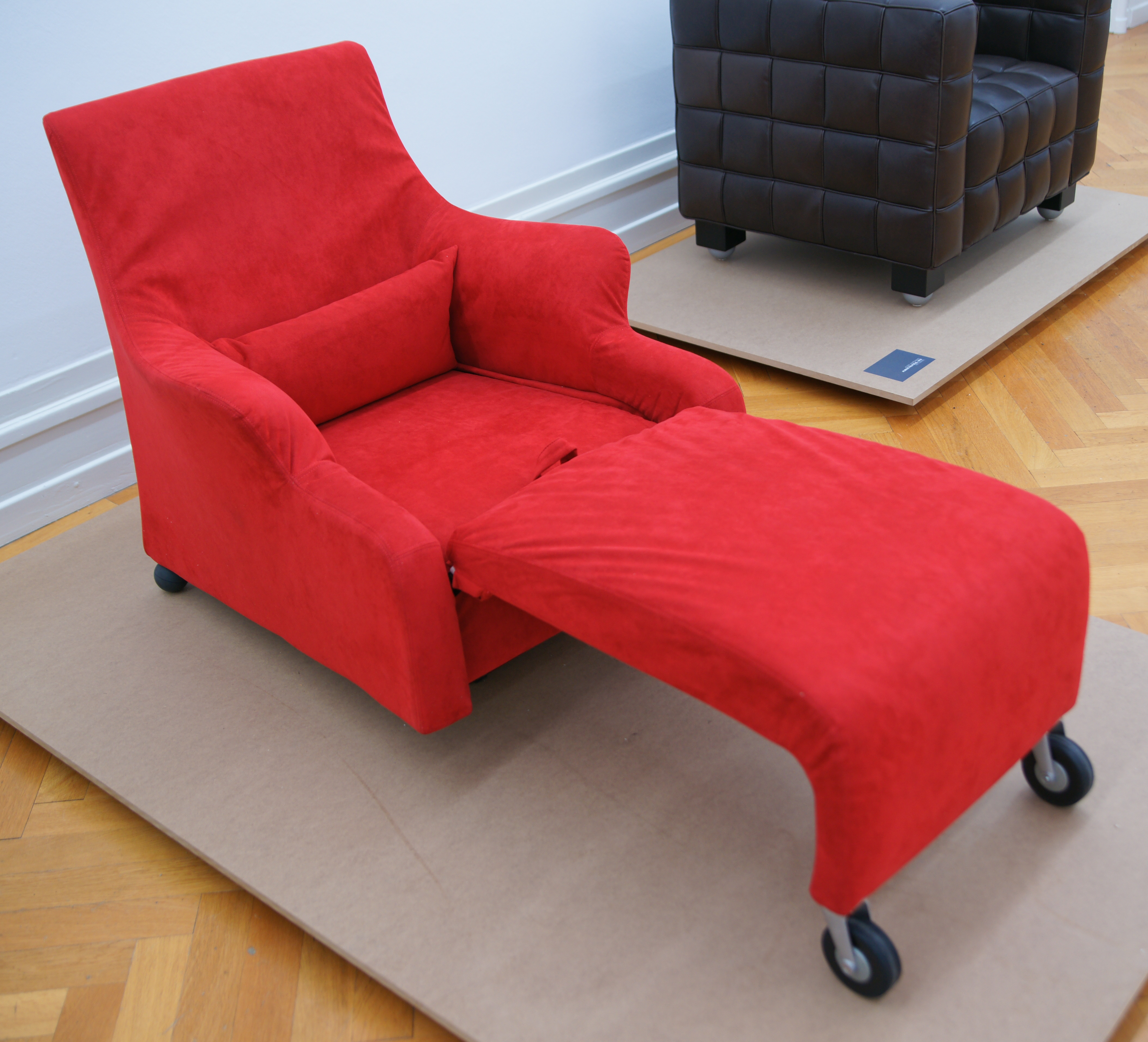
Chaise Longue (1996)

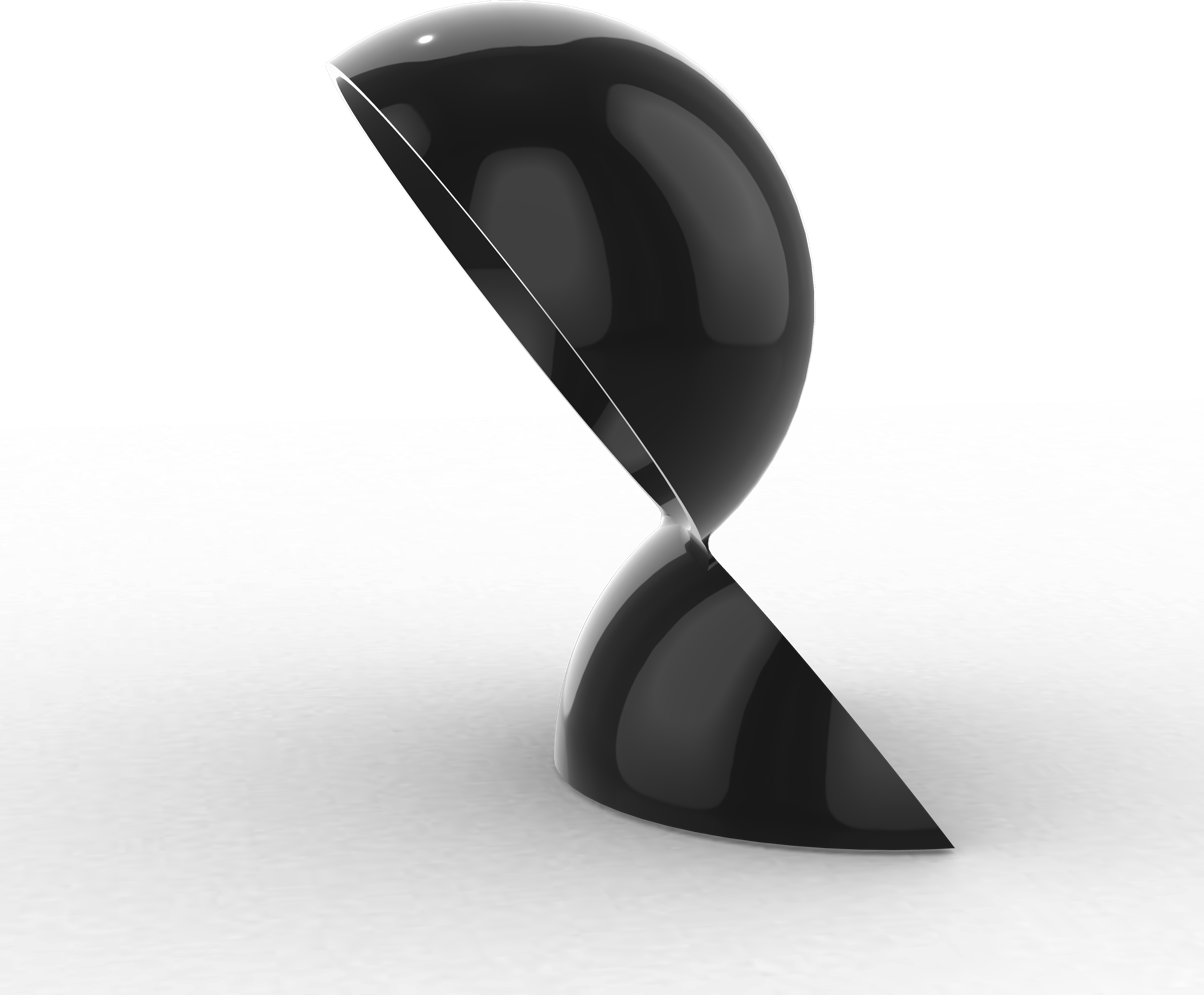
Dalù lamp
Architecture by Magistretti in Lombardy (photographed by Paolo Monti)

Building in corso Europa 22, Milan (1955–1957), detail

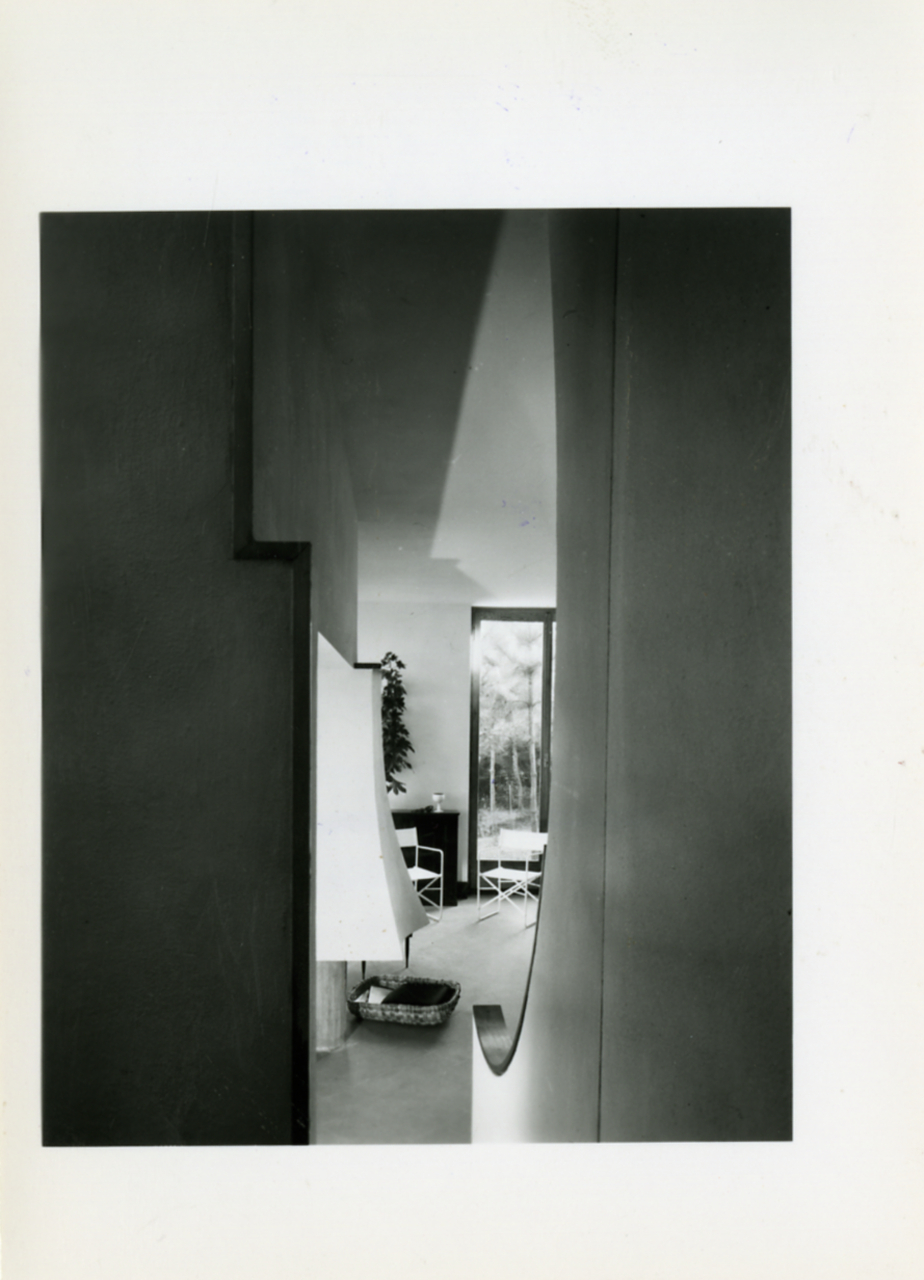
Villa Arosio, Arenzano (1958): interiors

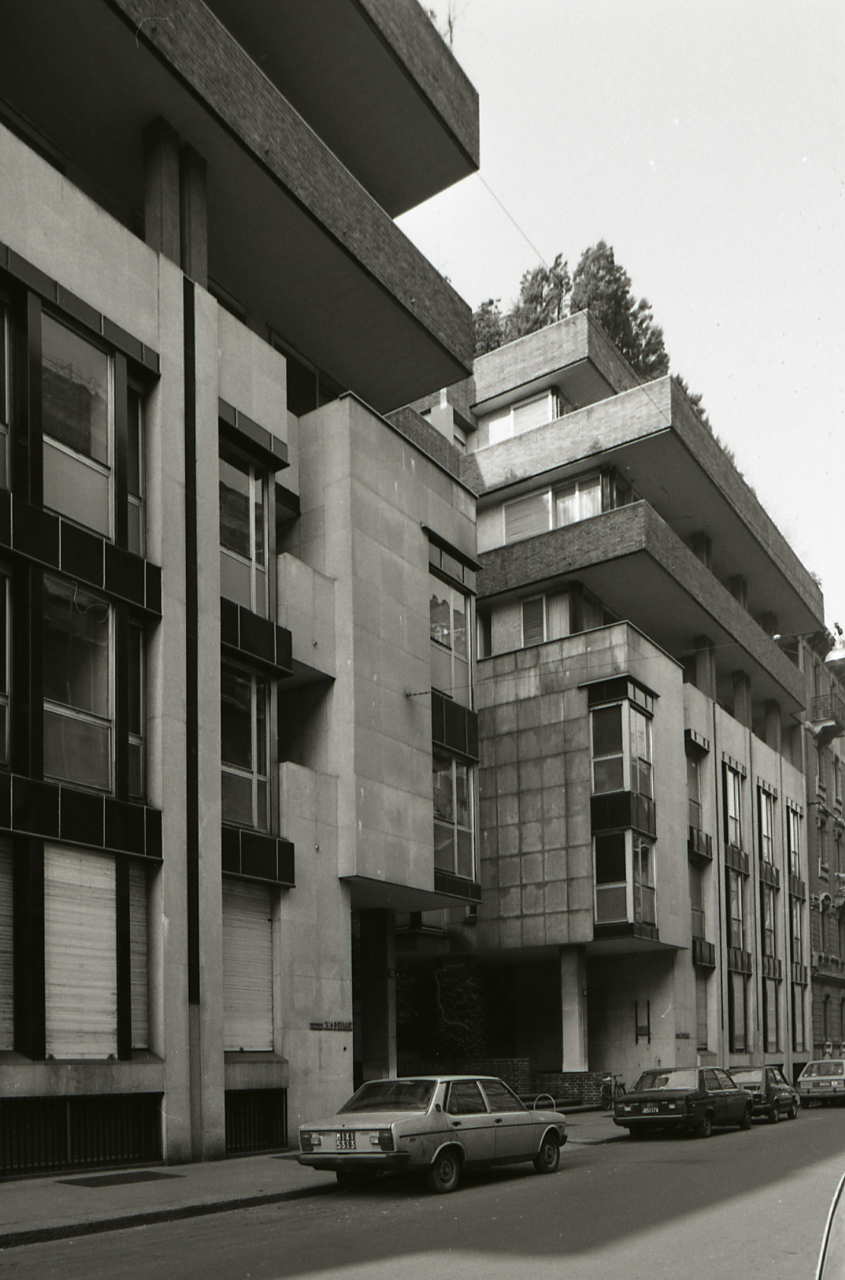
Building in via Leopardi, Milan (with Guido Veneziani), 1961

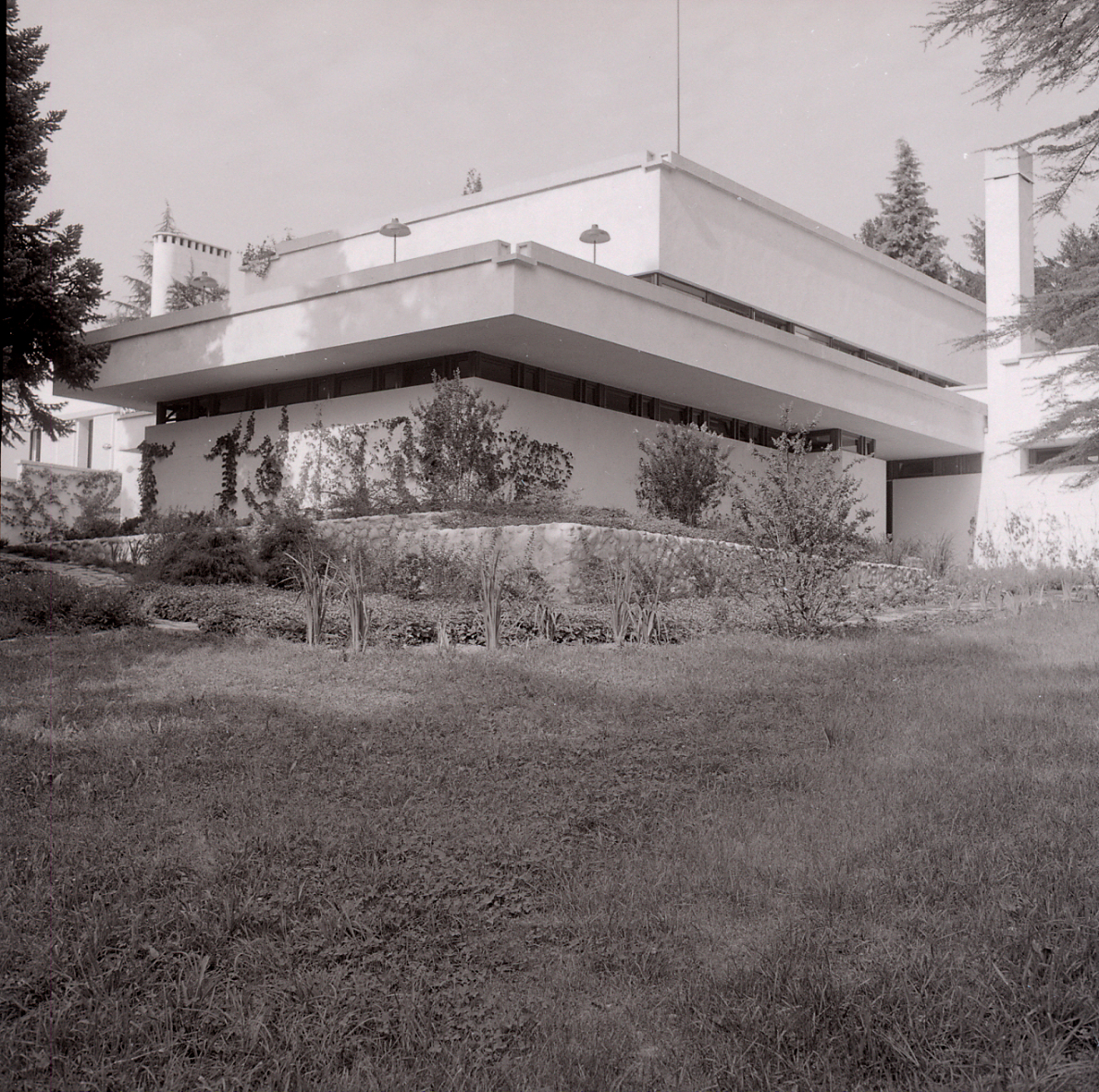
Carimate Golf club (with Guido Veneziani)

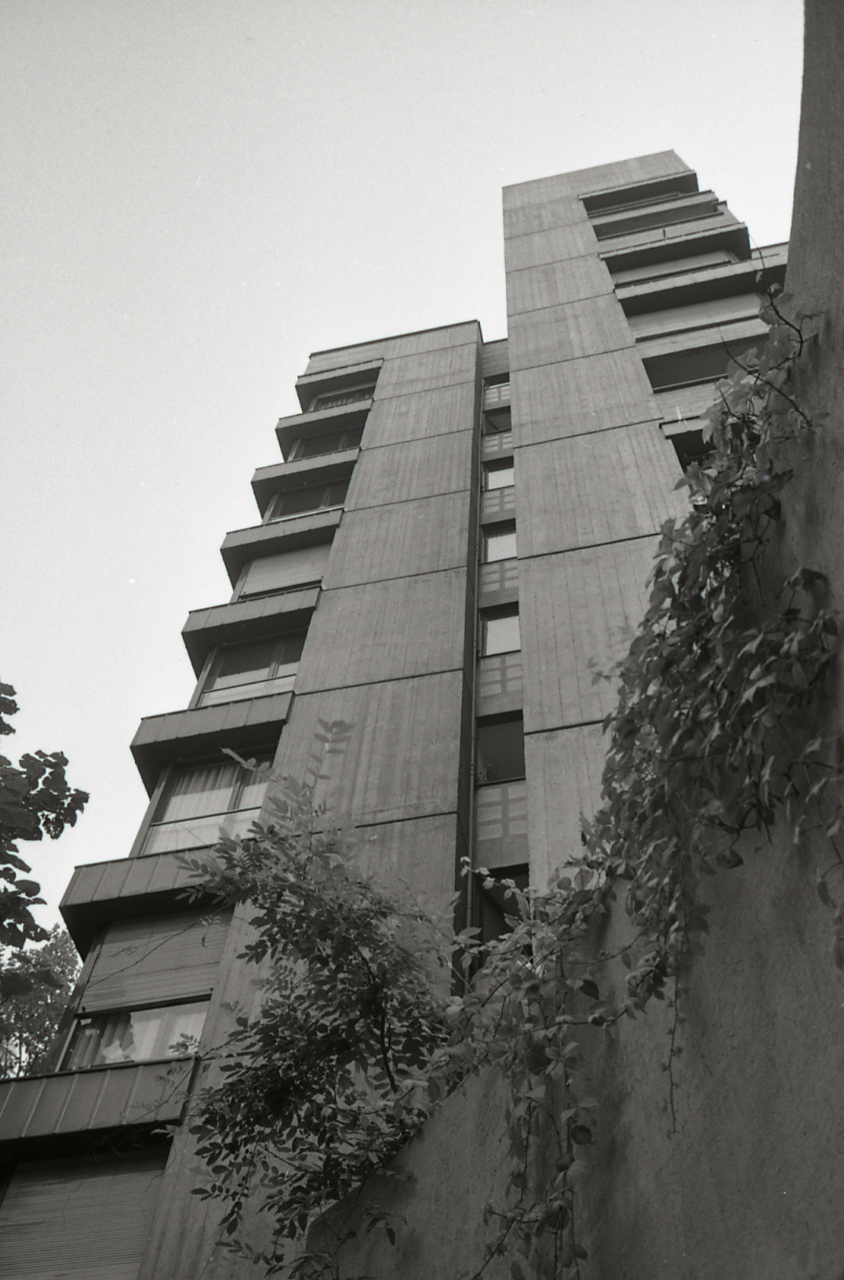
Milan, tower house in piazzale Aquileia 8, 1964–1965

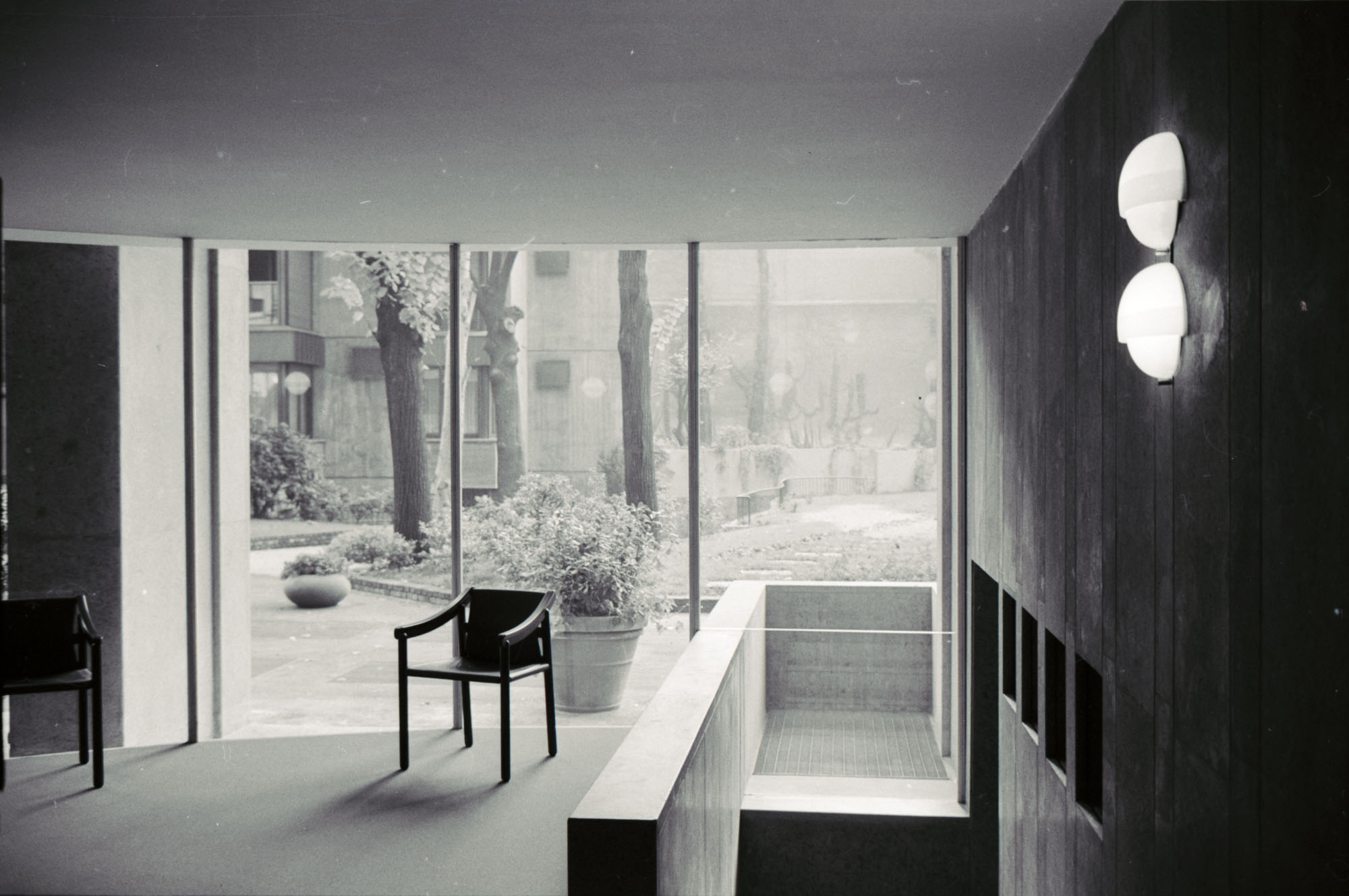
Interior, Milan, c. 1965

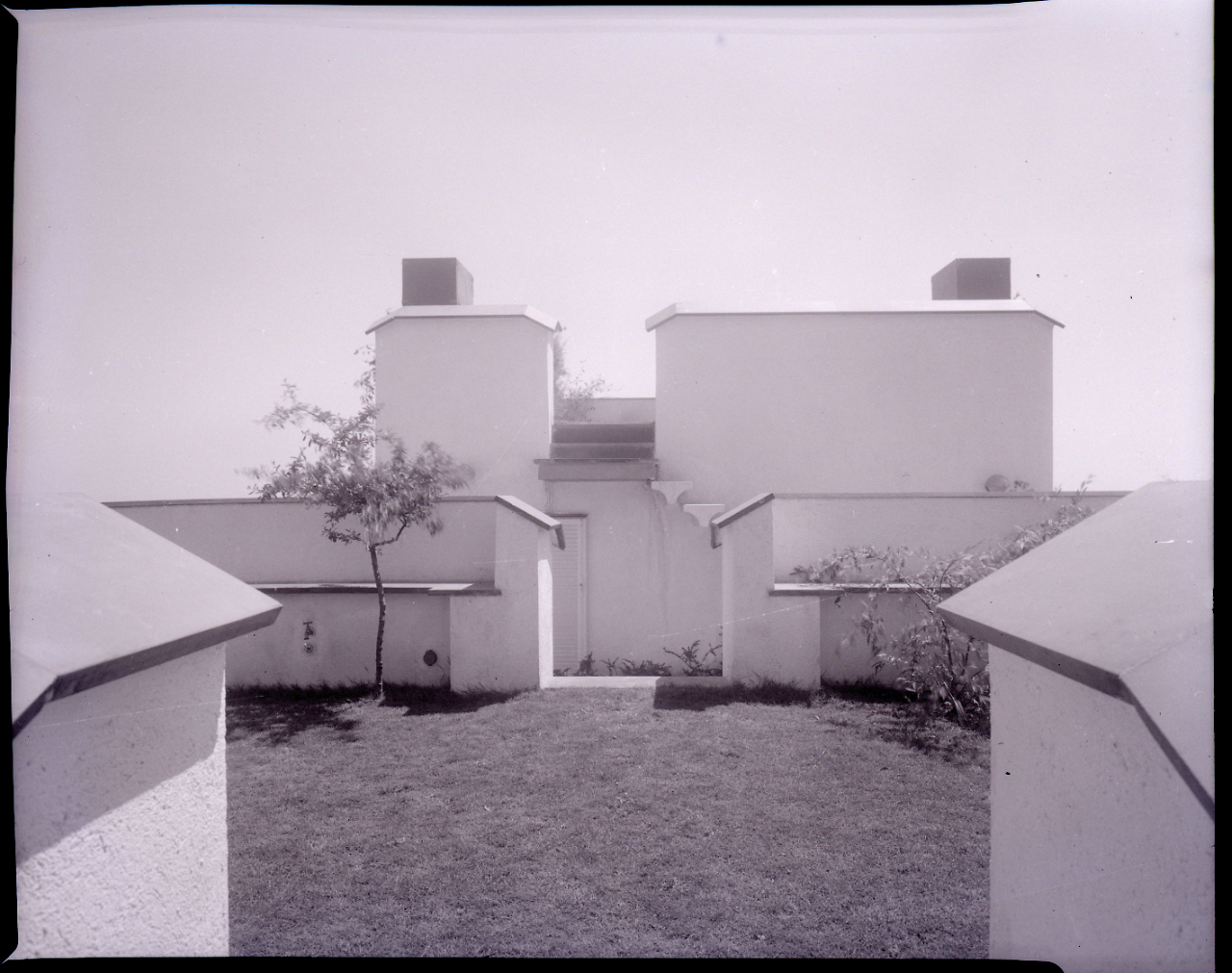
Villa Arosio, Arenzano (1958)

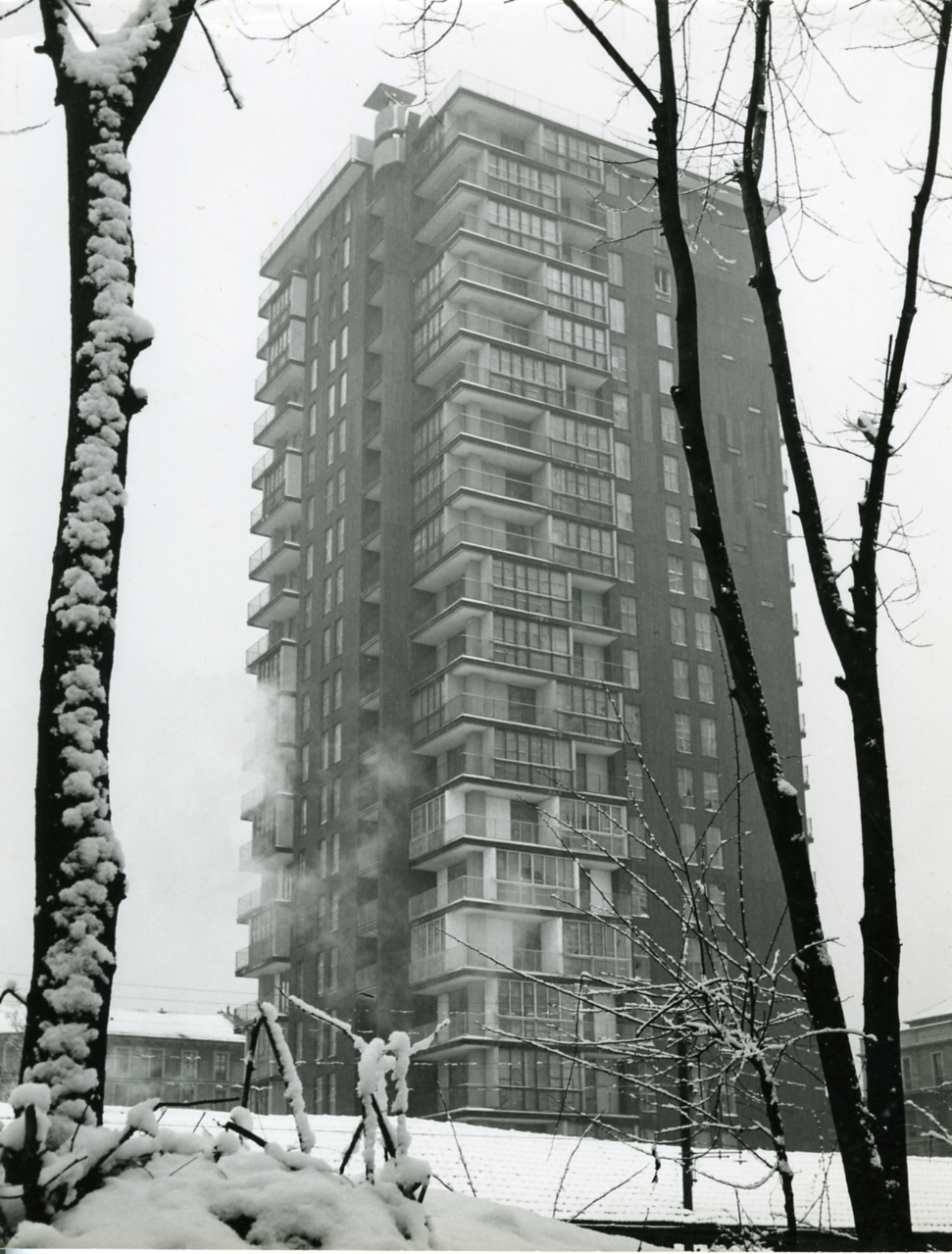
Torre del Parco, Milan (1953–56, with Franco Longoni). Photo by Paolo Monti

== Publications ==
- Neri, Gabriele; Magistretti, Vico; Fondazione La Triennale di Milano (2021). Vico Magistretti : architetto milanese (in Italian). Milano. ISBN 978-88-918-9009-2. OCLC 1253374091.
- Magistretti, Vico; Koivu, Anniina; Bimmerlein, Julia (2020). Vico Magistretti : stories of objects. Zurich. ISBN 978-3-03863-049-4. OCLC 1255365184.
