= Pier Giulio Magistretti =

Italian architect (1891–1945)

- Born: 27 April 1891; Milan, Kingdom of Italy
- Died: 15 February 1945 (aged 53); Milan, Italy
- Education: Polytechnic University of Milan
- Occupation: Architect
- Children: Vico Magistretti

Pier Giulio Magistretti (27 April 1891 – 15 February 1945) was an Italian architect associated with the Novecento Italiano movement. Active mainly in Lombardy during the 1920s and 1930s, he designed both public and private buildings.

== Life and career ==
Magistretti graduated from the Polytechnic University of Milan in 1914. He joined the National Fascist Party in 1924. He worked primarily in Milan and was one of the architects of the Palazzo dell'Arengario, together with Piero Portaluppi, Giovanni Muzio, and Enrico Agostino Griffini.

His son, Vico Magistretti, became one of Italy's leading architects and industrial designers after World War II.

== Works (selection) ==
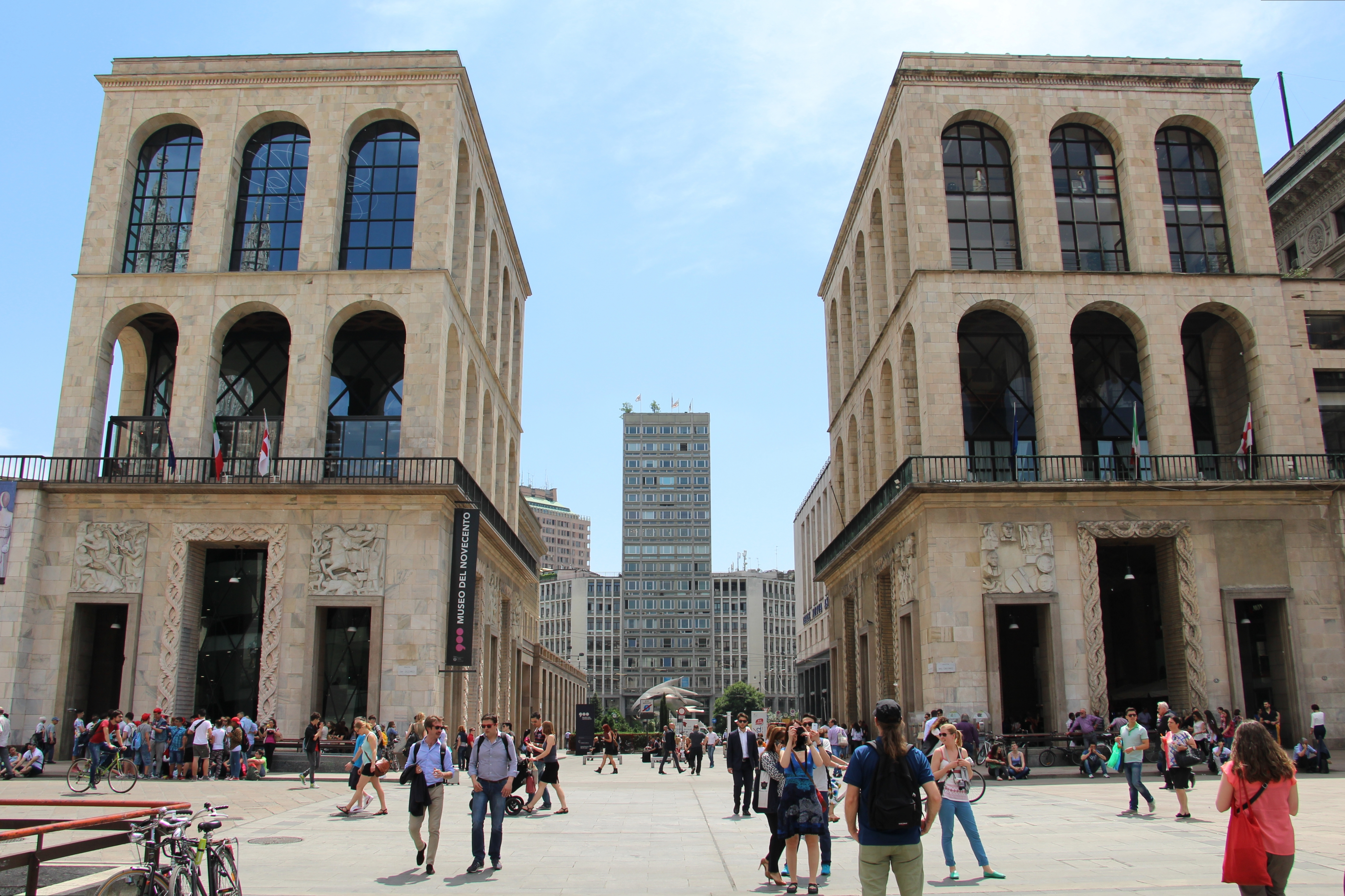
The Palazzo dell'Arengario

- Faculty of Science, University of Milan (1915–1927)
- Façade of the church of San Domenico, Legnano
- World War I Memorial, Valmadrera (1923)
- Palazzo in Piazza Duse 3, Milan (1925)
- Galleria del Corso, Milan (1926–1935)
- Palazzo Bolchini, Milan (1927–1930)
- Palazzo Santagostino in Via Melegari 4, Milan (1935)
- Palazzo dell'Arengario, Milan (from 1937)
