= Palazzo dell'Arengario =

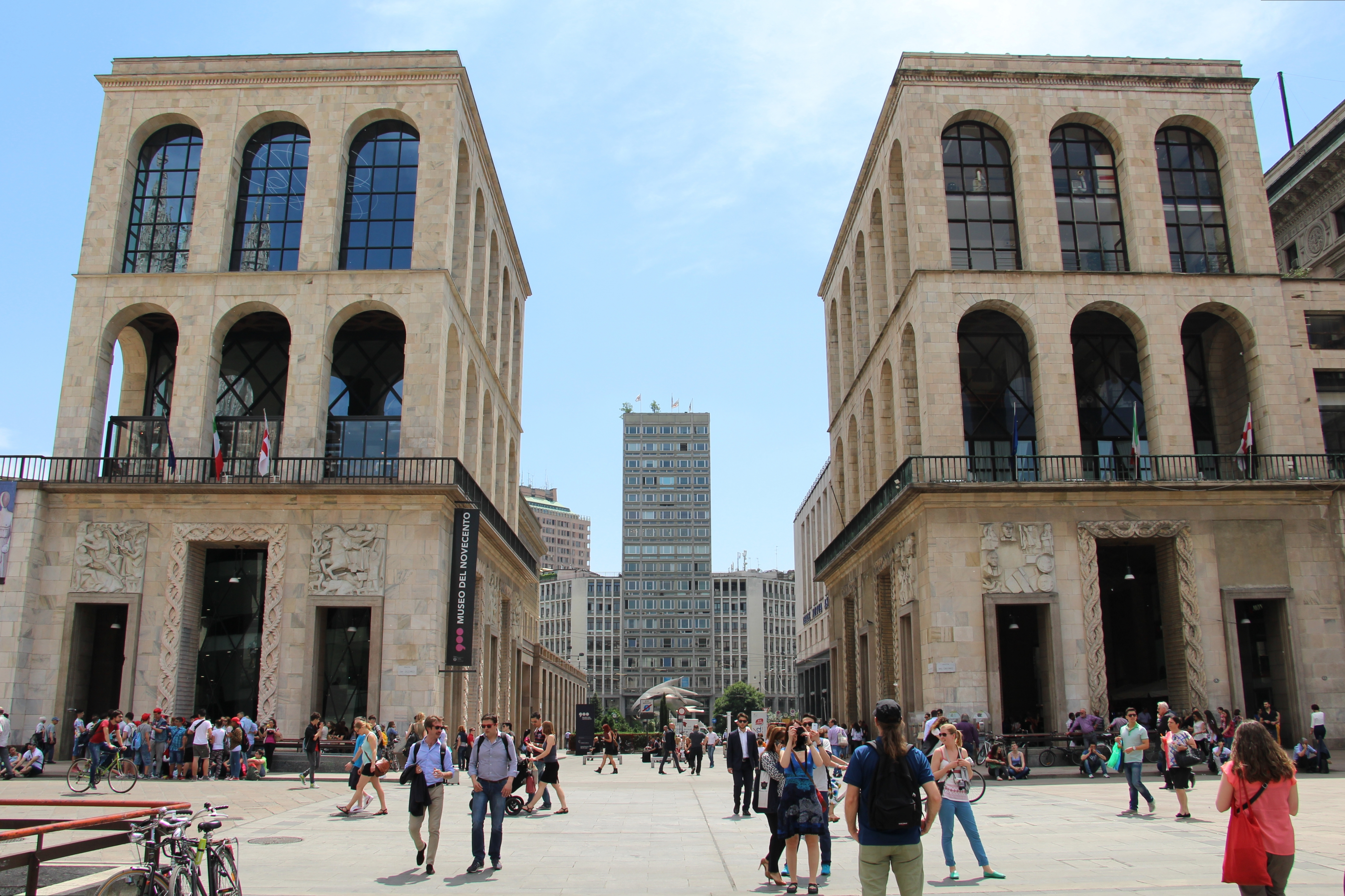
- Two wings of Palazzo dell'Arengario as viewed from Piazza del Duomo, in the distance is the Monument to the Carabinieri at the Piazza Armando Diaz

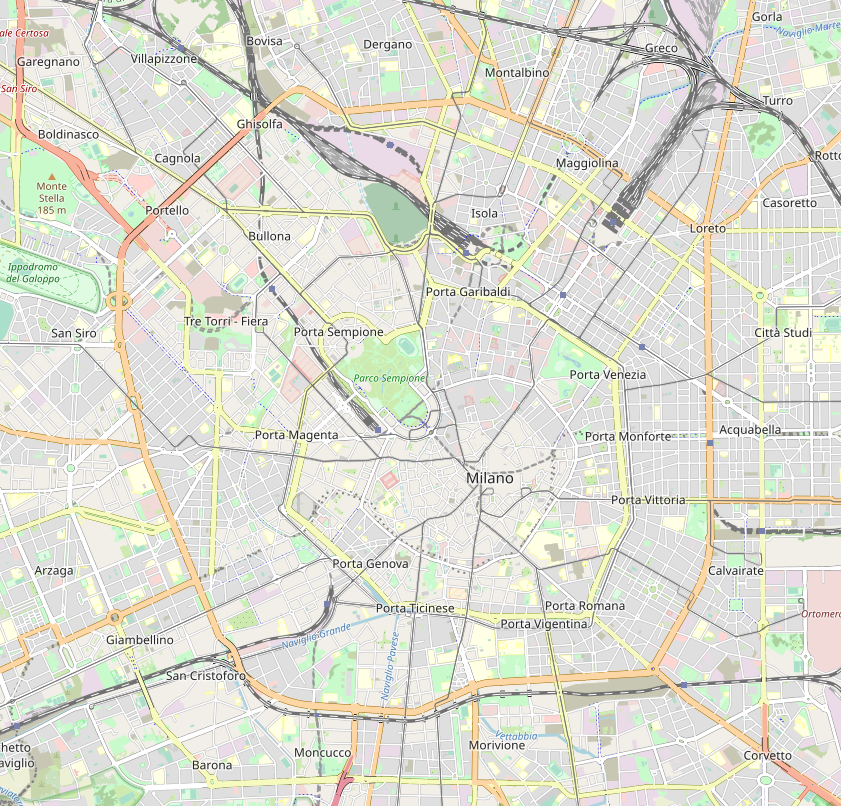
- Location within Milan Location within Italy

General information
- Architectural style: Novecento Italiano
- Location: Piazza del Duomo, Milan, Italy
- Coordinates: 45.4635°N 9.1900°E
- Current tenants: Museo del Novecento
- Construction started: 1936
- Completed: 1956
- Renovated: 2000s

Technical details
- Material: Façade: Candoglio marble

Design and construction
- Architects: Piero Portaluppi; Giovanni Muzio; Pier Giulio Magistretti; Enrico Agostino Griffini
- Other designers: Façade: Arturo Martini

Renovating team
- Architects: Italo Rota; Fabio Fornasari

The Palazzo dell'Arengario is an early-20th century complex of two symmetrical buildings in Piazza del Duomo, the central piazza of Milan, Italy. It was completed in the 1950s and currently houses the Museo del Novecento, a museum dedicated to 20th-century art. The word "arengario" refers to its original function as a local government seat in the Fascist period.

== History ==
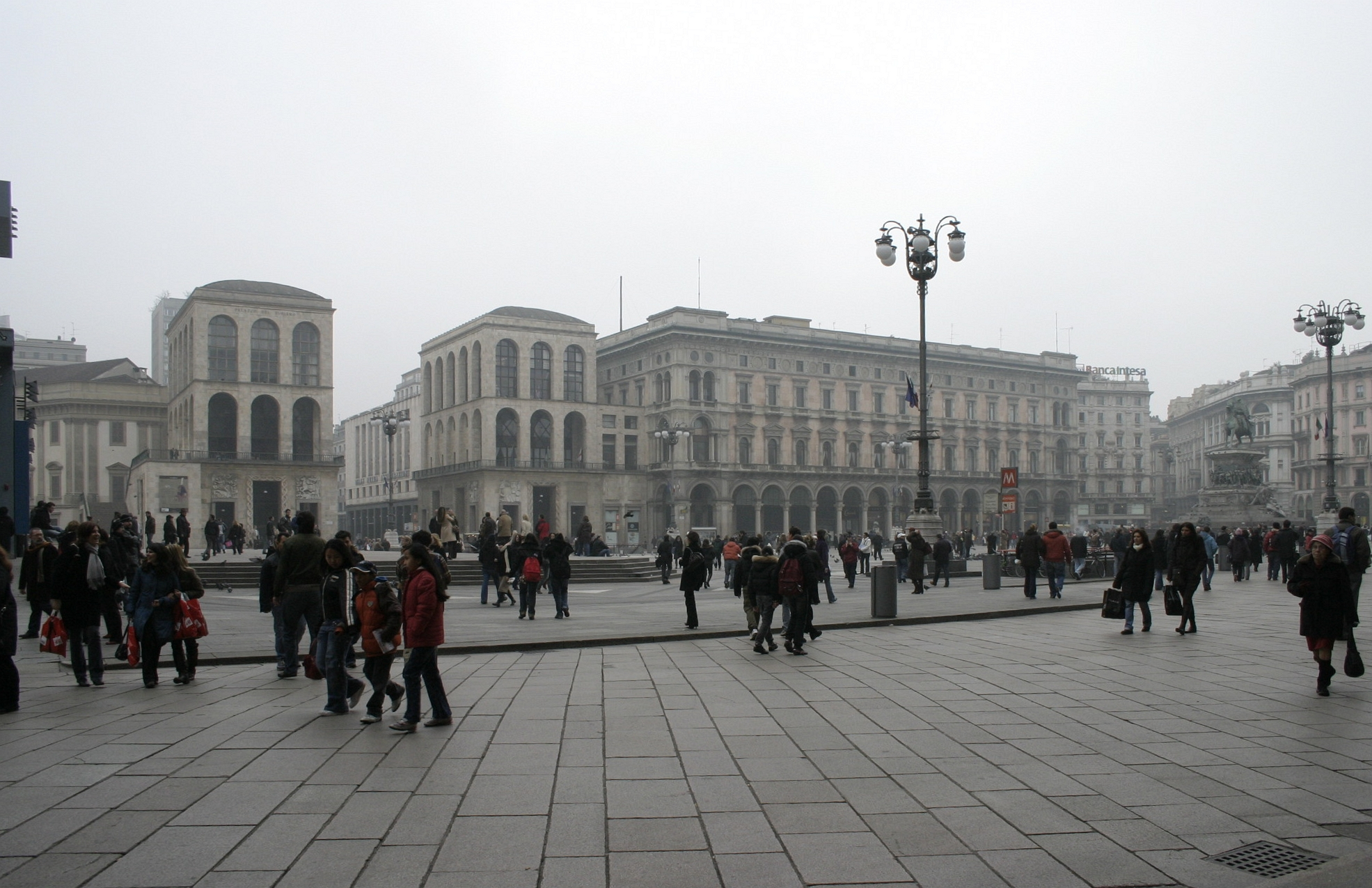
Piazza del Duomo in 2007; Palazzo dell'Arengario is on the left

The Arengario was designed by Piero Portaluppi, Giovanni Muzio, Pier Giulio Magistretti and Enrico Agostino Griffini. The palaces were meant to be connected by an arch to insinuate symmetry with the Galleria Vittorio Emanuele II entrance across the Piazza. Construction began in 1936, but experienced several delays and suffered from the World War II bombings; it was eventually completed in 1956. The façades on the eastern wing are decorated with 4 reliefs by Arturo Martini. The crowded panels depict historical events and persons linked to Christianity, Milan, and Lombardy: including the dream of Constantine (easternmost panel, facing Duomo); Ambrose on horseback enters Milan take his bishopric against the wishes of the Arians (inner panel, eastern wing, facing Duomo); the busy Battle of Legnano (northernmost panel facing western wing); four Sforza dukes of Milan (middle panel facing western wing); and Carlo Borromeo ministering to those afflicted by the plague (southernmost panel facing west wing). The 4 main portals are decorated by Giacomo Manzù.

In the 2000s, the palace was restored and adapted by Italo Rota and Fabio Fornasari to house the Museo del Novecento, a museum of twentieth-century art inaugurated in 2010, especially renowned for its unique collection of Futurist paintings. During the restoration works, a "media façade" (i.e., a 487 m^{2} LED screen displaying news on upcoming events, advertising, and more) was affixed to the façade of the left-hand building.
