= Mario Cereghini =

Italian architect (1903–1966)

- Born: 16 May 1903; Lecco, Kingdom of Italy
- Died: 23 July 1966 (aged 63); Madesimo, Province of Sondrio, Italy
- Education: Polytechnic University of Milan
- Occupation: Architect

Mario Cereghini (16 May 1903 – 23 July 1966) was an Italian architect associated with the Italian Rationalist movement. His work focused particularly on Alpine architecture, landscape design, and urban planning.

== Life and career ==
Cereghini joined the National Fascist Party in 1921. He studied art in Bergamo before graduating from the Polytechnic School of Architecture of Milan in 1928. He collaborated with Gian Luigi Banfi and the Como Rationalist Group, including Giuseppe Terragni and Pietro Lingeri, and co-designed the "House for an Artist on the Lake" for the Fifth Milan Triennial in 1933. He was also a founding member of the architectural journal Quadrante and served on the editorial board of Rassegna di architettura.

From the late 1930s onward Cereghini developed urban planning proposals for Lecco and became known for his research and designs concerning Alpine architecture and the relationship between buildings and mountain landscapes.

== Sources ==
- Agri, Gin; Cani, Fabio; Monizza, Gerardo (1981). Como. Guida alla storia all'arte all'attualità. Como: New Press.
- Cereghini, Mario (1939). Architetture 1929-1939. Lecco: Tipografia Grassi.
- Ciagà, Graziella Leyla (2003). Gli archivi di architettura in Lombardia. Censimento delle fonti. Milan: Centro di Alti Studi sulle Arti Visive. p. 60.
- Dell'Oro, Massimo, ed. (1987). Mario Cereghini: l'architettura, la grafica, il design, l'opera letteraria. Lecco: Stefanoni.
