= Palazzo Bolchini =

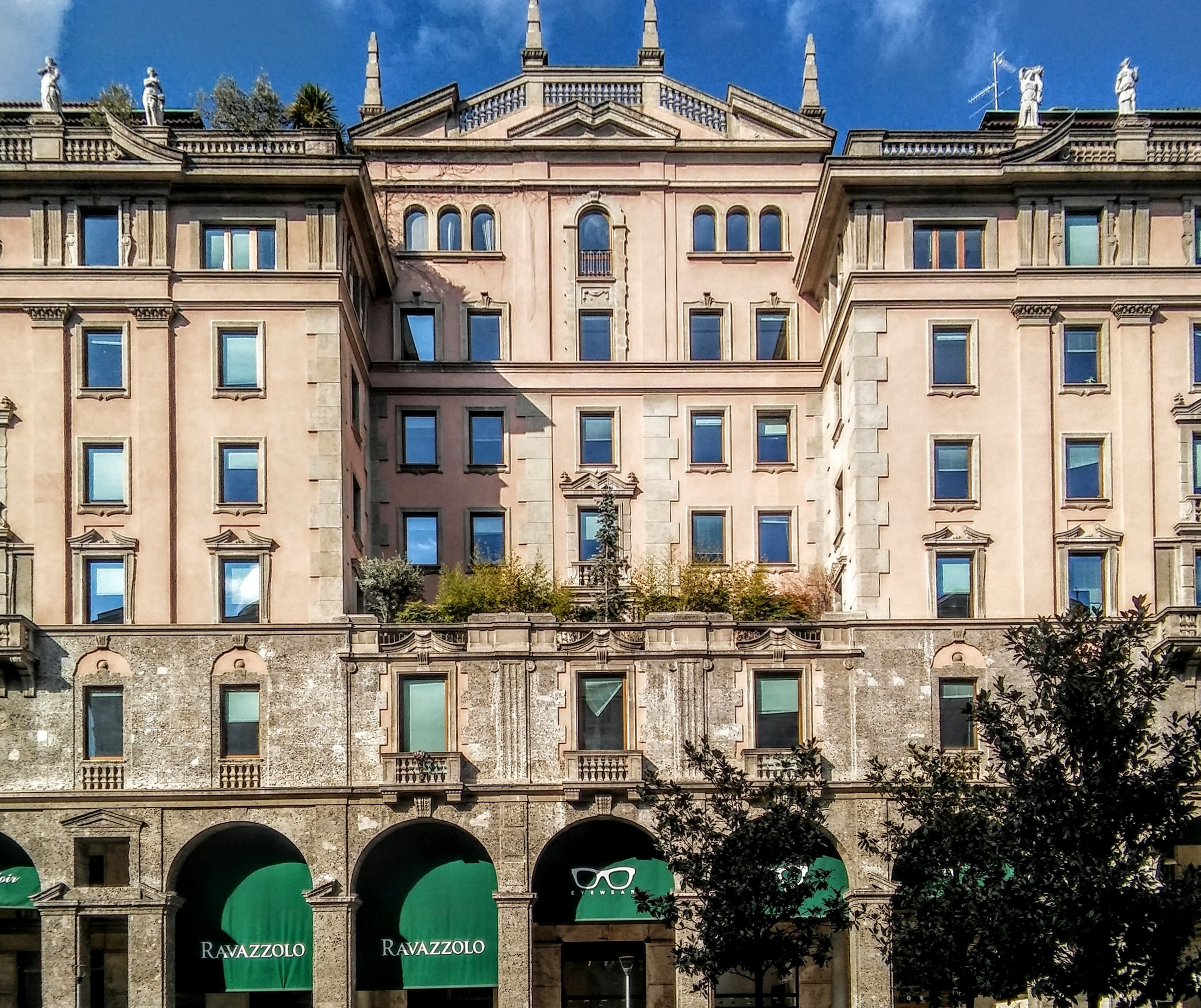
- Palazzo Bolchini in 2017
- Click on the map for a fullscreen view

General information
- Location: Milan, Italy
- Coordinates: 45°28′01.96″N 9°11′34.98″E

Design and construction
- Architect: Pier Giulio Magistretti

Palazzo Bolchini is a historic building located in Milan, Italy.

== History ==
The building, designed by architect Pier Giulio Magistretti, was constructed between 1928 and 1930.

== Description ==
The structure features an Art Deco style with elements that recall the Neoclassicism of the nearby Piazza Belgioioso, expressed through the use of obelisks, statues and balustrades as decorative features on the top floor.

The eight-story building has a public portico at the ground level clad in ceppo stone, which also covers the first floor. The upper floors feature a stucco façade, with the main decorative level characterized by windows framed with ornate pediments.
