= Eugenio Faludi =

Hungarian-Italian architect and urban planner (1899–1981)

- Born: Jakab Floh; 1899; Budapest, Austria-Hungary
- Died: 1981 (aged 81–82); Toronto, Ontario, Canada
- Occupations: Architect, urban planner

Eugenio Giacomo Faludi (born Jakab Floh; 1899 – 1981) was a Hungarian-born Italian architect and urban planner. A leading exponent of Italian Rationalism, he was active in Italy during the 1920s and 1930s before emigrating to Canada in 1940, where he became a prominent planner and prepared master plans for several Canadian cities.

== Life and career ==
Born in Budapest into a Jewish family, Faludi moved to Italy, where he graduated from the School of Architecture in Rome in 1924. He joined the Gruppo Urbanisti Romani and later the Movimento Italiano per l'Architettura Razionale (MIAR), exhibiting at the First and Second Exhibitions of Rational Architecture. During the 1930s he worked mainly in Milan, collaborating with Enrico Agostino Griffini on housing, exhibition architecture and public buildings, including the Istituto per l'Infanzia in Lodi.

After settling in Ontario, Canada in 1940, he specialized in urban planning and urban renewal, drafting master plans for several Canadian cities, including Toronto, Windsor, Hamilton, Peterborough, Stratford, Etobicoke and Terrace Bay.

== Selected publications ==
- Architetture (1939)
- A Study of Prefabricated Houses (1940)
- The Township of Niagara Area Plan (1959)
- A Fifteen Year Programme for the Urban Renewal of the City of Windsor and Its Metropolitan Area (1960)
- Urbanization: Urban Planning and Renewal in Canada (1960)
- Rebuilding a City: The Urban Renewal of Greater Sault Ste. Marie (1961)
- The Future of Timmins: An Urban Renewal Study (1967)
