= Casa Crespi =

Casa Crespi (via Sant'Andrea)
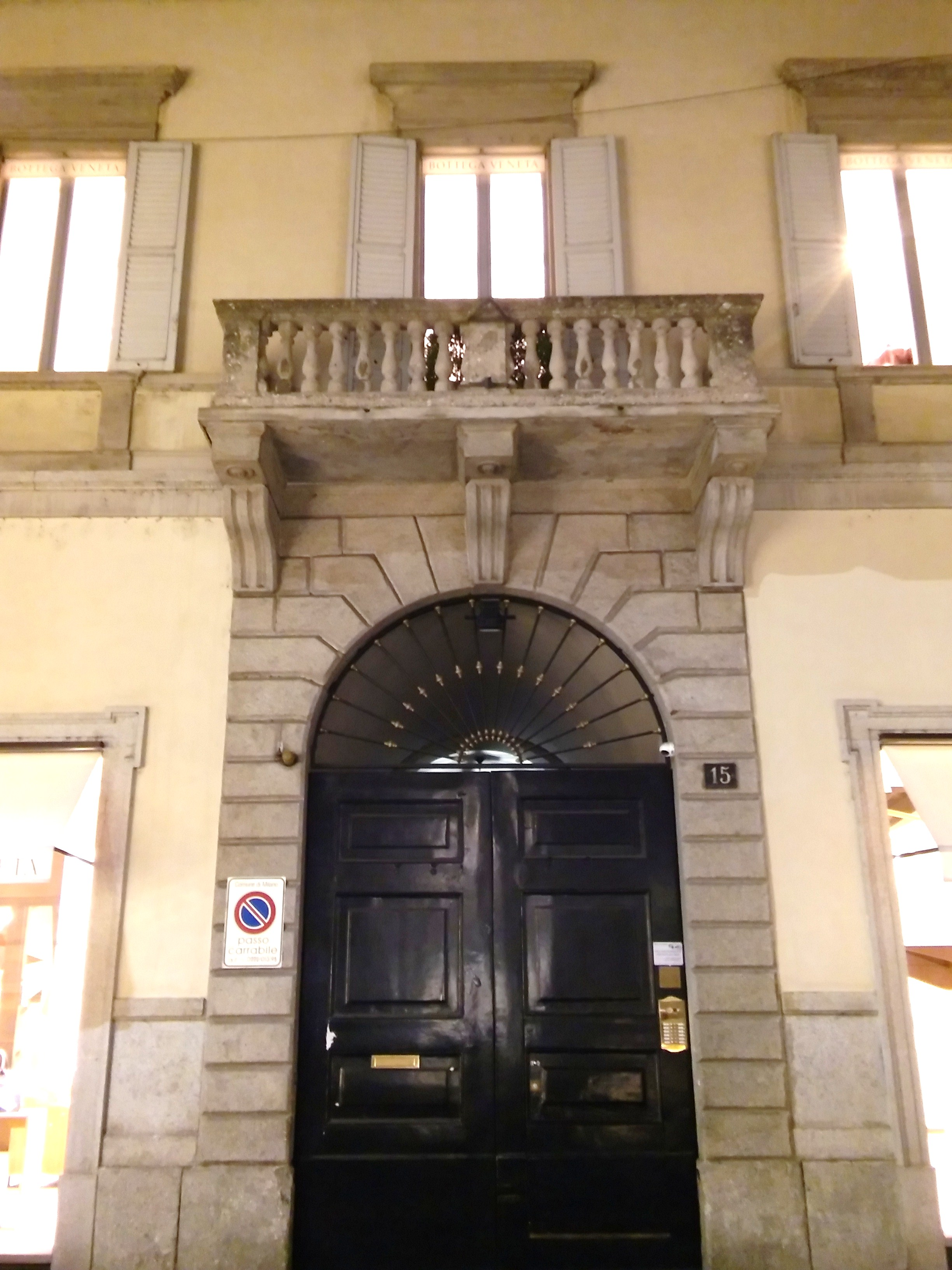
- Portal Casa Crespi
- Interactive map of the Casa Crespi (via Sant'Andrea) area

General information
- Status: In use
- Type: Palace
- Architectural style: Renaissance architecture
- Location: Milan, Italy, 15 via Sant'Andrea
- Coordinates: 45.468899°N 9.196651°E
- Construction started: 16th century
- Renovated: 18th century

Casa Crespi is a historic building in Milan located at 15 Via Sant’Andrea.

== History and description ==
Although the palace dates back in its original form to the 16th century, it underwent major reconstruction during the 18th century. The façade is rather sober and austere: the ground floor is centred on the portal in smooth ashlar crowned by a balcony supported by corbels, while the openings flanking the portal are decorated with stone cornices. On the piano nobile, the windows are decorated with mouldings with high entablature, a decoration that disappears on the second floor to make room for windows with simple stone cornices. The interior is presented as a horseshoe-shaped building, with the side facing the eighteenth-century ashlar-work internal façade dedicated to the entrance to the garden.

The building, for many years the residence of the Manara family, was the birthplace of patriot Luciano Manara.

== See also ==
- Casa Piumi
- Palazzo Acerbi

== Bibliography ==
=== Italian sources ===
- Attilia Lanza, Milano e i suoi palazzi: Porta Orientale, Romana e Ticinese, Libreria Meravigli Editrice, 1993.
