= Giuseppe Marotta (writer) =

Italian writer (1902–1963)

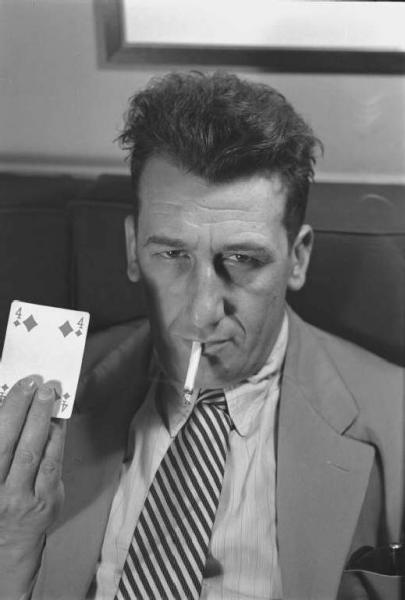
- Marotta in 1947
- Born: 5 April 1902; Naples, Kingdom of Italy
- Died: 10 October 1963 (aged 61); Naples, Italy
- Occupation: Writer

Giuseppe Marotta (5 April 1902 – 10 October 1963) was an Italian writer, screenwriter, film critic, lyricist and playwright.

== Life and career ==
Born in Naples, Italy, the son of a lawyer and a seamstress, Marotta suffered from bone tuberculosis in his childhood and adolescence. Starting from the early 1920s, he collaborated with newspapers and magazines with short stories and poetry; in 1924, he moved to Milan, where he was employed first at Mondadori as a proofreader and archivist and later at Rizzoli as editor.

Marotta made his literary debut in 1932, with the autobiographical novel Tutto a me. He then collaborated with the satirical magazines Bertoldo and Guerin Meschino and with the newspapers La Stampa and Corriere della Sera. In 1942 he started collaborating with the cinema industry, getting his major successes in the 1950s.

Marotta had his breakout in 1947, with the novel L'oro di Napoli, which won the Paraggi Prize, was a massive bestseller, and was later adapted in the Vittorio De Sica's film The Gold of Naples. Other successes include the novels San Gennaro non dice mai no ("Saint Gennaro never says no", 1948) and Gli Alunni del Sole ("The Pupils of the Sun", 1952, whose title inspired the band with the same name).

Marotta was also a film critic, writing for the magazines Film and L'Europeo, and winning the Viareggio Prize for the collection of reviews Marotta ciak (1958). He authored several comedy plays, notably Il califfo Esposito (1956) and Bello di papà (1957), both starring Nino Taranto. A lyricist since mid-1920s, he wrote the lyrics for Milva's hit "Mare verde" as well as for several Festival di Napoli entries. He died of a cerebral haemorrhage on 10 October 1963, at the age of 61.
