= Casa Atellani =

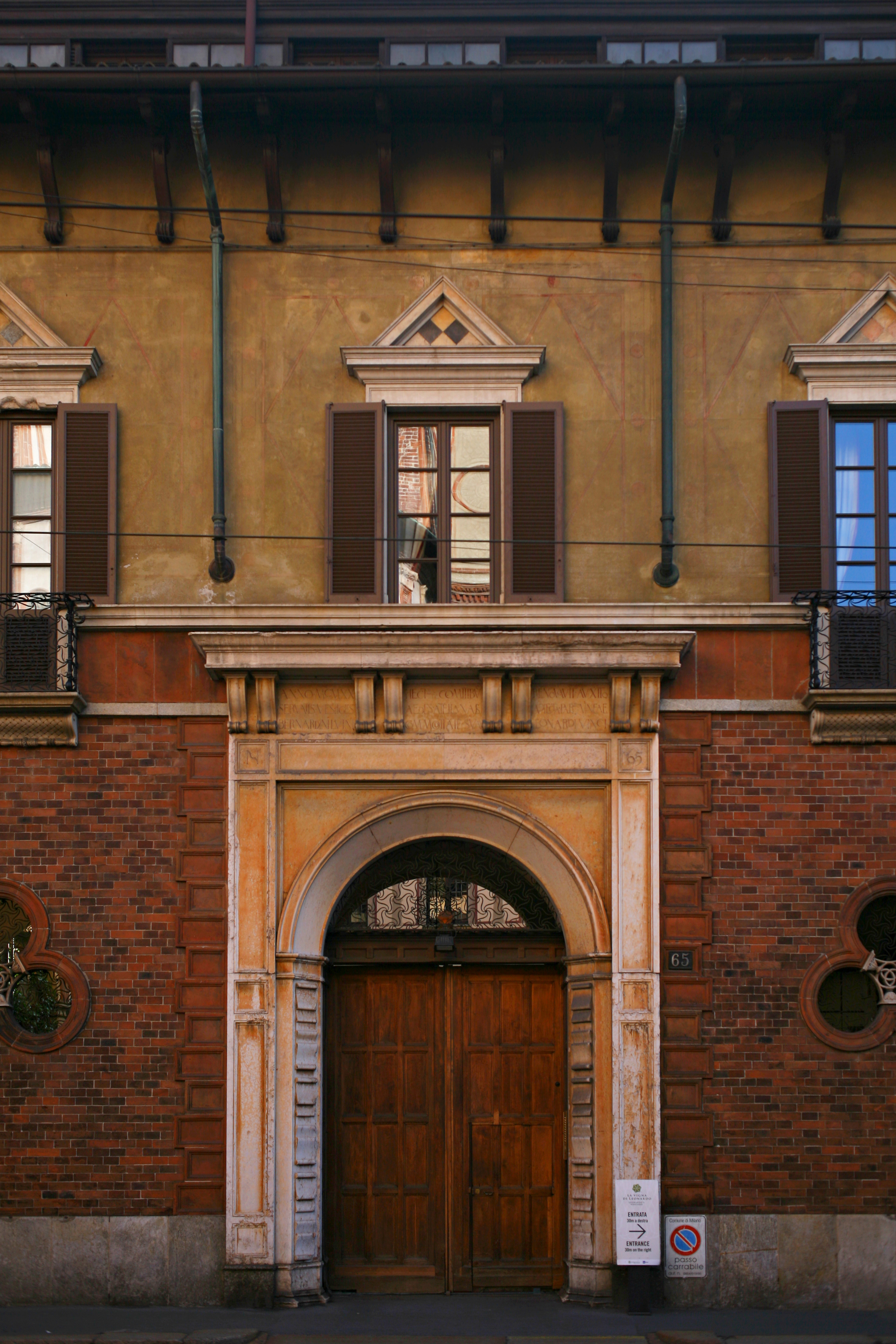
- Section of the facade
- Interactive map of the Casa Atellani area
- Alternative names: Casa degli Atellani

General information
- Status: In use
- Type: Palace
- Architectural style: Renaissance architecture
- Location: Milan, Italy, 65–67 via corso Magenta
- Coordinates: 45.465561°N 9.170958°E
- Construction started: 15th century

Design and construction
- Architect: Piero Portaluppi (restoration)

Casa Atellani, or also Casa degli Atellani, is a memorial that belonged to Ludovico Sforza, Duke of Milan, the last surviving trace of the ancient Borgo delle Grazie. Historically part of the Sestiere di Porta Vercellina, today it is located at numbers 66 and 67 of Corso Magenta. It was owned by the Castellini Baldissera family.

In December 2022, the purchase by the LVMH group of Bernard Arnault was confirmed.

== History ==
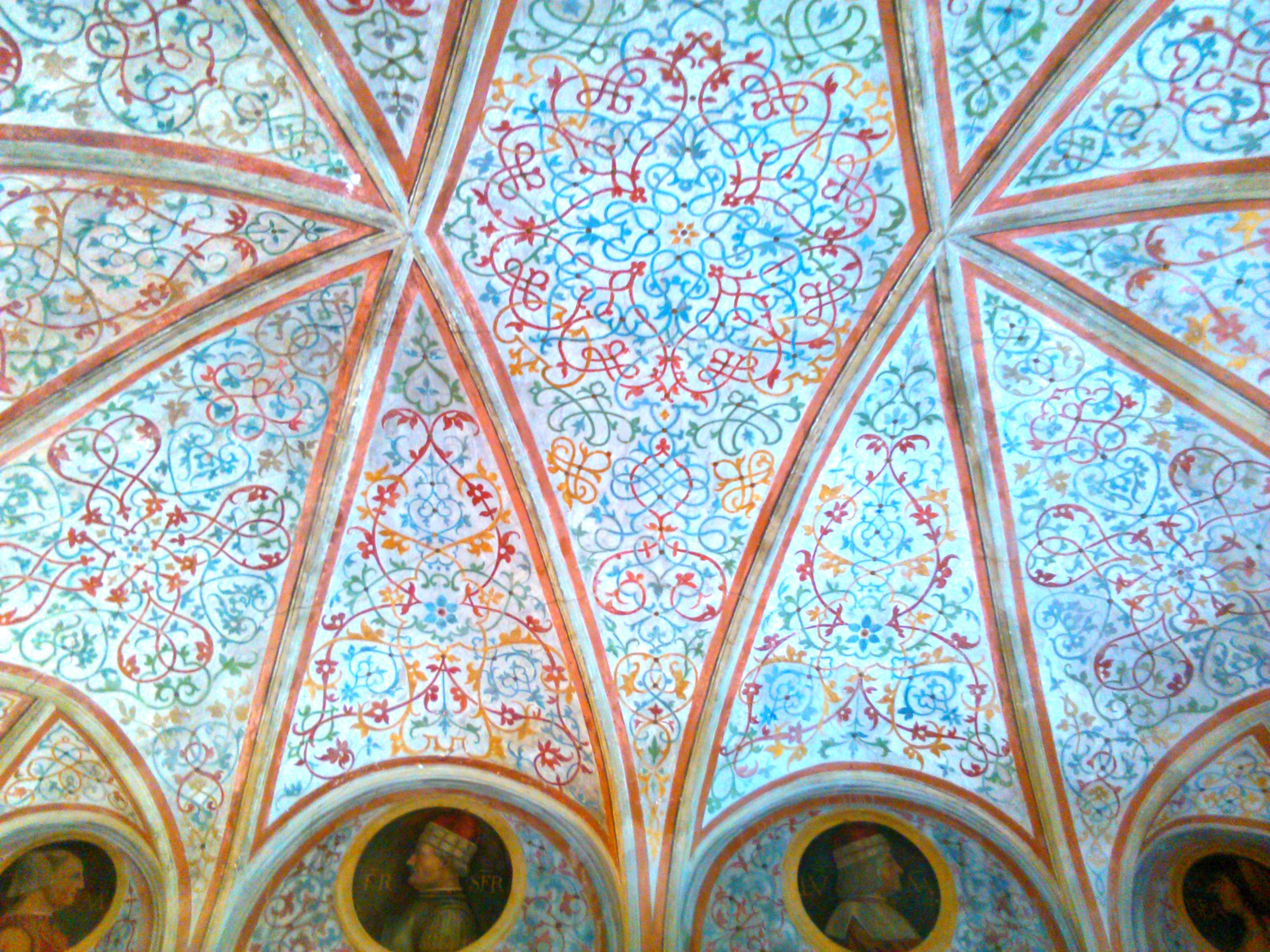
Paintings by Luini inside the palace

The mansion dates back to the time of Ludovico il Moro, during which the lord of Milan granted numerous building permits to courtiers and collaborators, wishing to make the road axis of the ancient borgo di porta Vercellina a prestigious surround for the newly built church of Santa Maria delle Grazie. The duke, after buying the residence in 1490 from the Landi, counts of Piacenza, donated it to the Atellani, his courtiers: the house became famous for the feasts organised by the owners, also described in many chronicles of the time, which brought together the leading personalities of the Sforza court.

After many changes of ownership over the centuries, it came into the hands of the Conti family, who in 1922 had the house restored by the architect Piero Portaluppi, who heavily modified its appearance, but rediscovered part of the original frescoes. The façade was completely redone and incorporated four medallions with sculpted portraits of the Sforza family by Pompeo Marchesi, while the fourteen lunettes frescoed with busts of the Sforza family are preserved from the original structure, believed to be the work of Leonardesque painter Bernardino Luini, now in the rooms of the Castello Sforzesco Museums, and some frescoes in the 15th-century courtyard, whose portico has umbrella ceilings with eight segments.

Within the garden, restored by Portaluppi in a neo-Baroque style, a philological replanting of the so-called Leonardo da Vinci's Vineyard was carried out in collaboration with the University of Milan, a vineyard donated by the Duke of Milan to the Genius of the Renaissance as compensation for his works, and of which the strain belonging to it has been identified, through research into the living biological residues of the original roots found during manual excavation, as Malvasia of Candia.

== Description ==
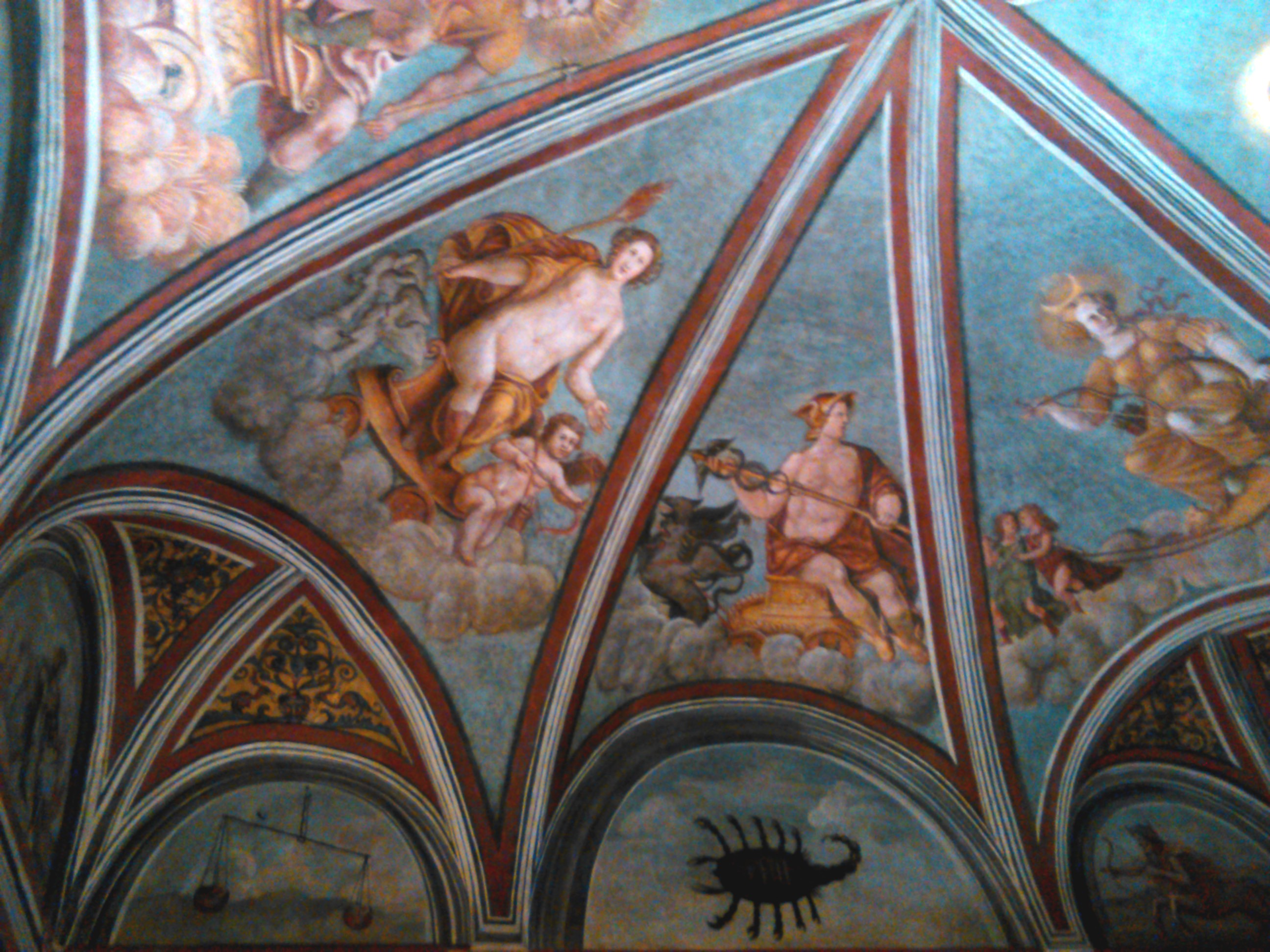
Zodiac Hall Detail

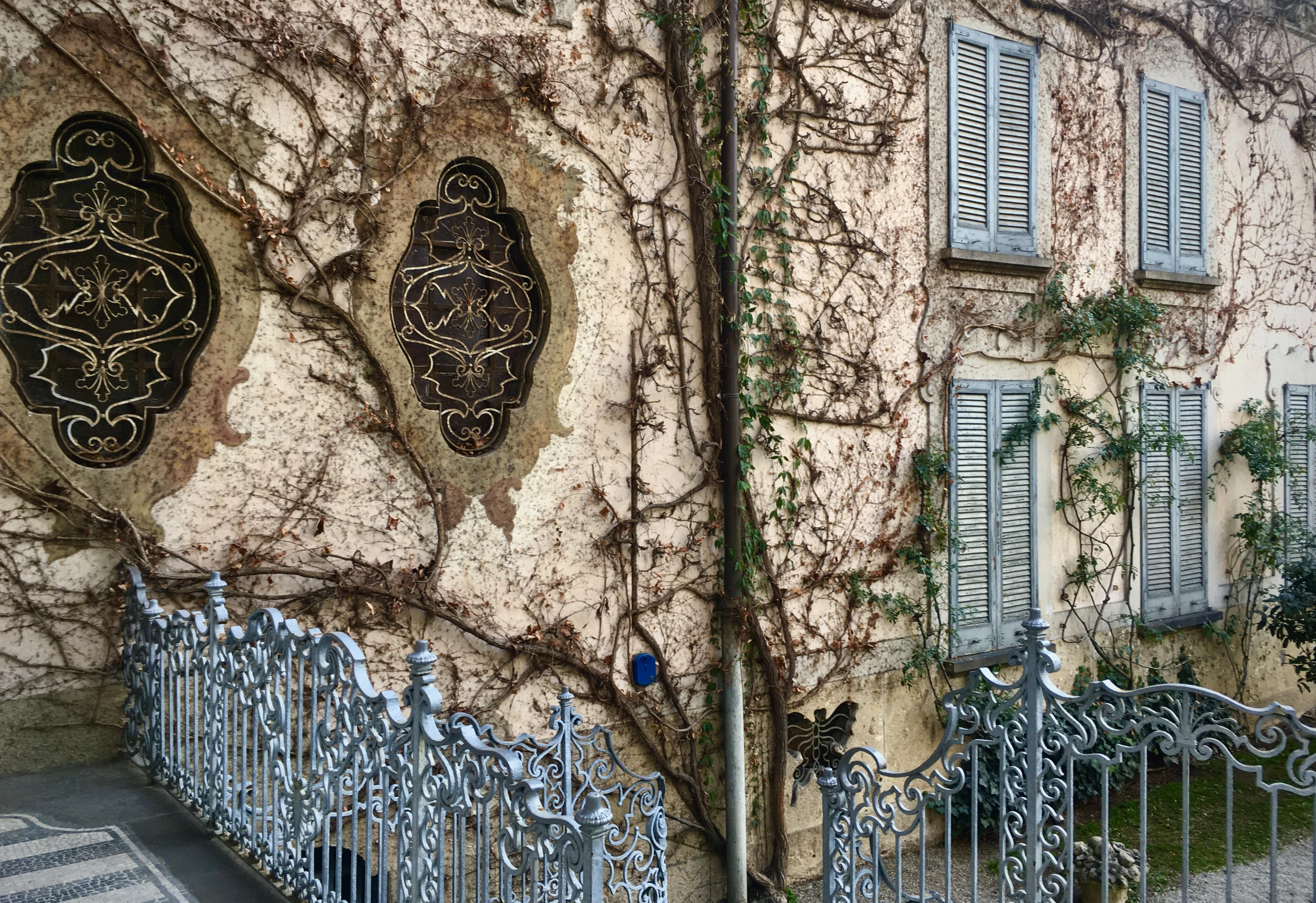
Detail of the railing of the staircase leading to the garden of Casa Atellani in Milan

=== Hall of the Zodiac ===
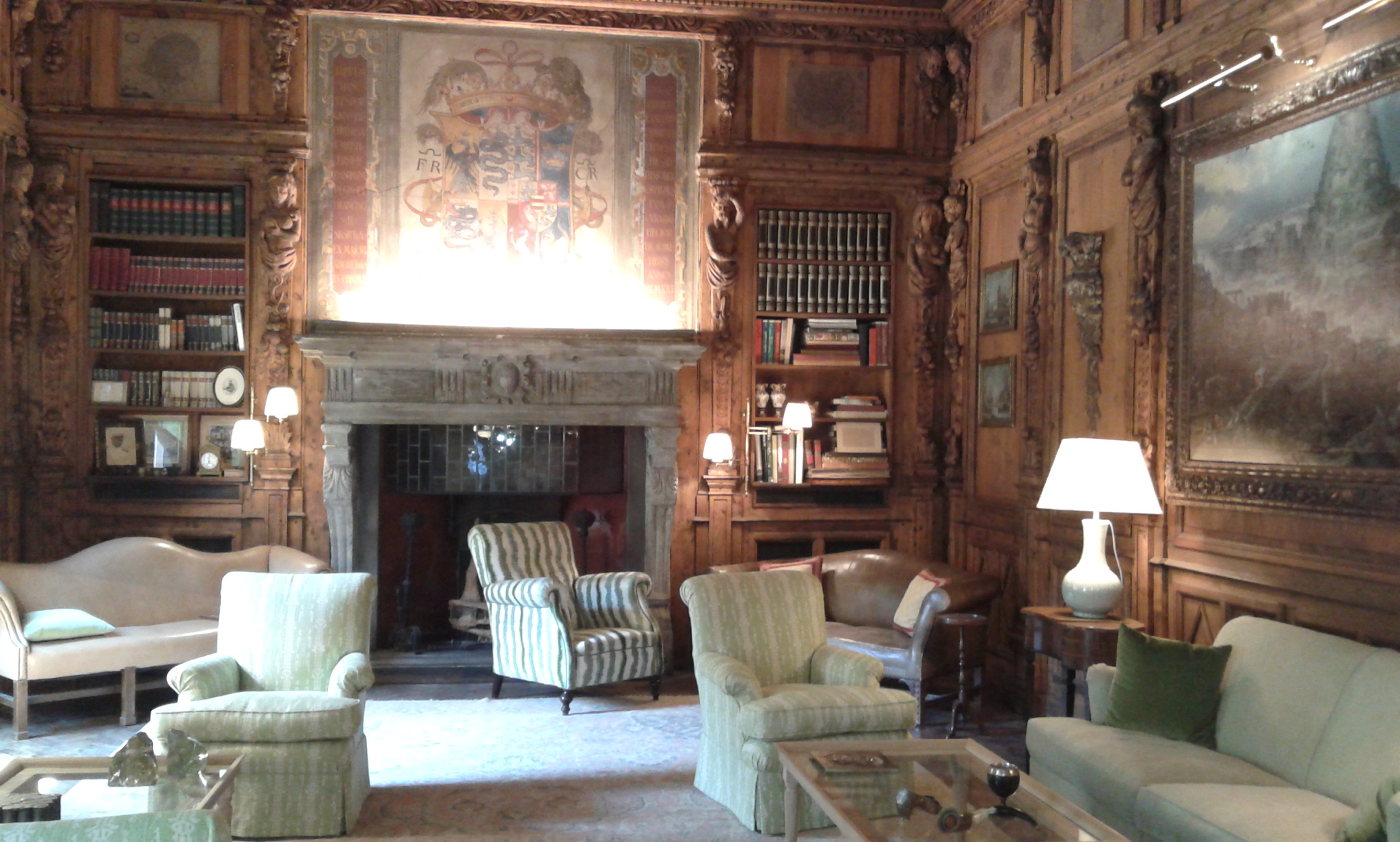
Studio by Ettore Conti

The Zodiac Room consists of fourteen lunettes representing twelve signs of the zodiac, since architect Portaluppi, in 1922, enlarged the room by knocking down the oblique windowed wall, gaining space to decorate it with two more lunettes, inside which inscriptions can be distinguished: the first is the motto 'Faire sans dire' and the other by the letters 'H and J' indicating the initials of Hector (Ettore Conti) and Joanna (Giannina Casati, his wife). The Zodiac Room is testimony to architect Portaluppi's skill in mixing what is authentic as it is truly ancient, and what is not. It can be seen that the wall to the west is heavily worked with frequent retouches, while the walls to the east, restored by the architect and Conti in 1922, are authentic.

=== Ettore Conti's study ===
After the Sala dello Zodiaco one proceeds to the study of Ettore Conti, a great entrepreneur of the Italian electrical industry who entered the residence in the early 20th century. In the room, which directly overlooks the garden of Leonardo's vineyard, there is a fireplace surrounded by inlaid wooden walls, where the coats of arms and insignia resulting from the alliance of the marriage between Christina of Denmark and Francesco Sforza can be distinguished. The figures, on the wall above the fireplace, represent: the three Crowns Sweden, the eagle and the «bison» the Visconti and the Sforza (but the former also the Empire), the golden lion Norway and the golden dragon the King of Vendi. The walls covered in 18th-century wood panelling contain the volumes of a sizeable library.

== See also ==
- Casa Crespi

== Bibliography ==
=== Italian sources ===
- Silvio Leydi, Rossana Sacchi, Il Cinquecento, Milano, Nodo Libri, 1999, ISBN 88-7185-082-3.
- Attilia Lanza, Marilea Somarè, Milano e i suoi palazzi: porta Vercellina, Comasina e Nuova, Vimercate, Libreria Meravigli editrice, 1993, ISBN non esistente.
