= Manuel Faleschini =

Italian entrepreneur

- Born: 13 July 1978 (age 47); Dolo, Italy
- Occupation: Entrepreneur
- Known for: Founder and CEO of Waycap S.p.A.

Manuel Faleschini (born 13 July 1978 in Dolo, Veneto) is an Italian entrepreneur. He is the founder and chief executive officer of Waycap S.p.A., a company that designs and manufactures headwear for Italian and international fashion brands.

== Biography ==
Faleschini was born in Dolo, a town in the province of Venice, on 13 July 1978. As a teenager, he developed an interest in fashion, customizing and reselling baseball caps purchased from local markets, an experience that marked his first entrepreneurial venture.

In 2002, he founded General Accessories, a company that produces headwear and accessories for Italian fashion brands. In 2015, he established Waycap S.p.A., headquartered in Mirano, a fashion company with a high-end manufacturing facility. To support international expansion, a private equity partnership was formed in 2019. During the COVID-19 pandemic, Faleschini directed a temporary conversion of the company's production facilities to manufacture certified protective masks. In 2023, the company's Mirano facility was renovated to meet energy class A standards that include water recovery systems and solar panels for renewable energy production; and Faleschini has initiated environmental initiatives that include offset of carbon emissions and improving local biodiversity.

In 2020, Faleschini acquired the historic Spazio Krizia building in Milan and he redeveloped it for creative and cultural use. The site was known in the 1980s and 1990s for hosting fashion shows and design exhibitions by Mariuccia Mandelli. The Rosapetra Spa Resort in Cortina d’Ampezzo was acquired in 2022, and renovated for the 2026 Winter Olympics held in Milan–Cortina. In 2024–2025, Faleschini was reported to have acquired Palazzo Acerbi in Milan, initiating a redevelopment project associated with fashion and design industries.

Faleschini has two sons, Leonardo and Edoardo, born in 2002 and 2003.
