= Piero Portaluppi =

Italian architect (1888–1967)

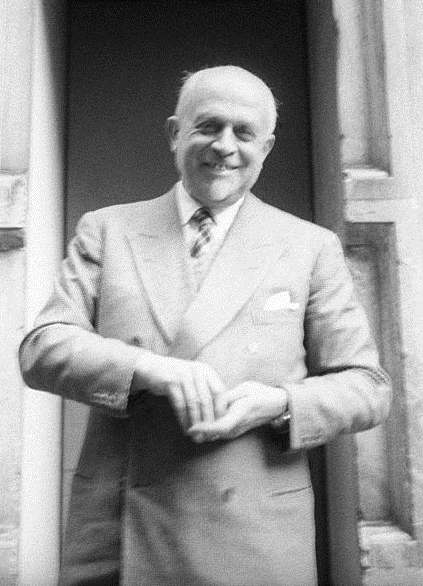
- Portaluppi in 1955
- Born: 19 March 1888; Milan
- Died: 6 July 1967 (aged 79); Milan
- Education: Polytechnic University of Milan
- Occupations: Architect, urban planner, cartoonist, visual artist
- Notable work: Expo 1928 Milan international exhibition, 1929 Barcelona International Exposition, Casa Atellani, Palazzo dell'Arengario, Pinacoteca di Brera, Planetario di Milano, Santa Maria delle Grazie, Villa Necchi Campiglio
- Political party: National Fascist Party
- Awards: Gold medal for merit in school, culture and art (1955); Grand Officer of the Order of Merit of the Italian Republic (1960)
- Website: www.portaluppi.org

Piero Portaluppi (19 March 1888 – 6 July 1967) was an Italian architect. He is known for his prolific output, having designed over 100 buildings in Milan.

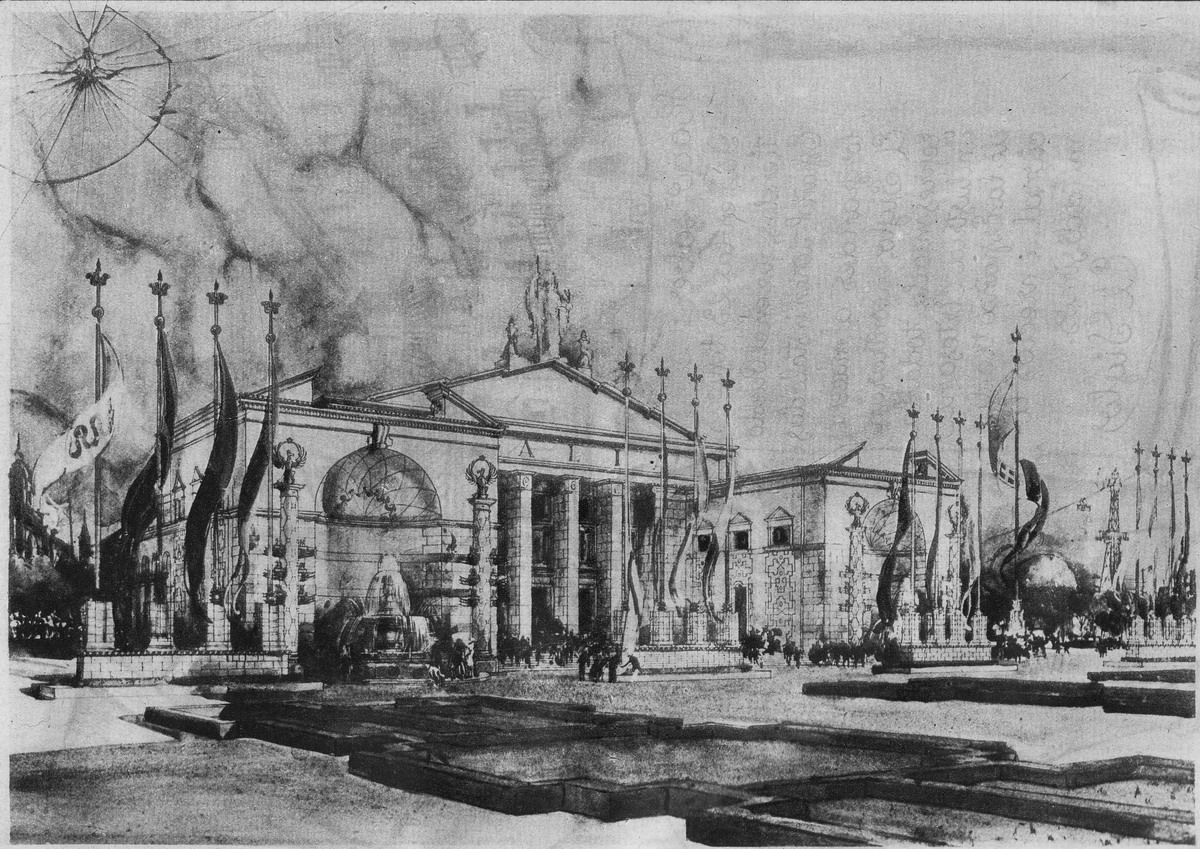
Padiglione italiano all'esposizione di Barcellona del 1929

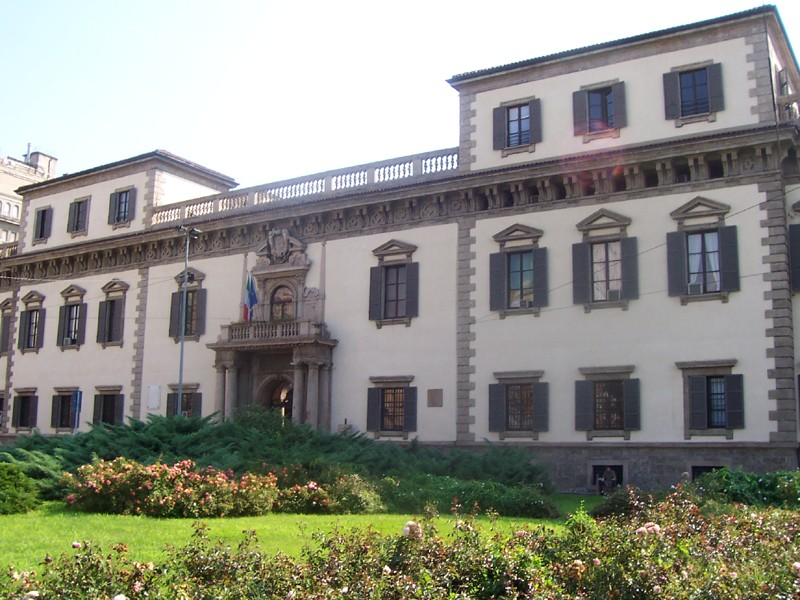
The Palazzo del Capitano di Giustizia, now a courthouse on Piazza Fontana in Milan. Designed in 1578 in the Milanese Baroque style by Pietro Antonio Barca and completed in 1605. Restored in 1960 by Portaluppi following World War II bombing damage.

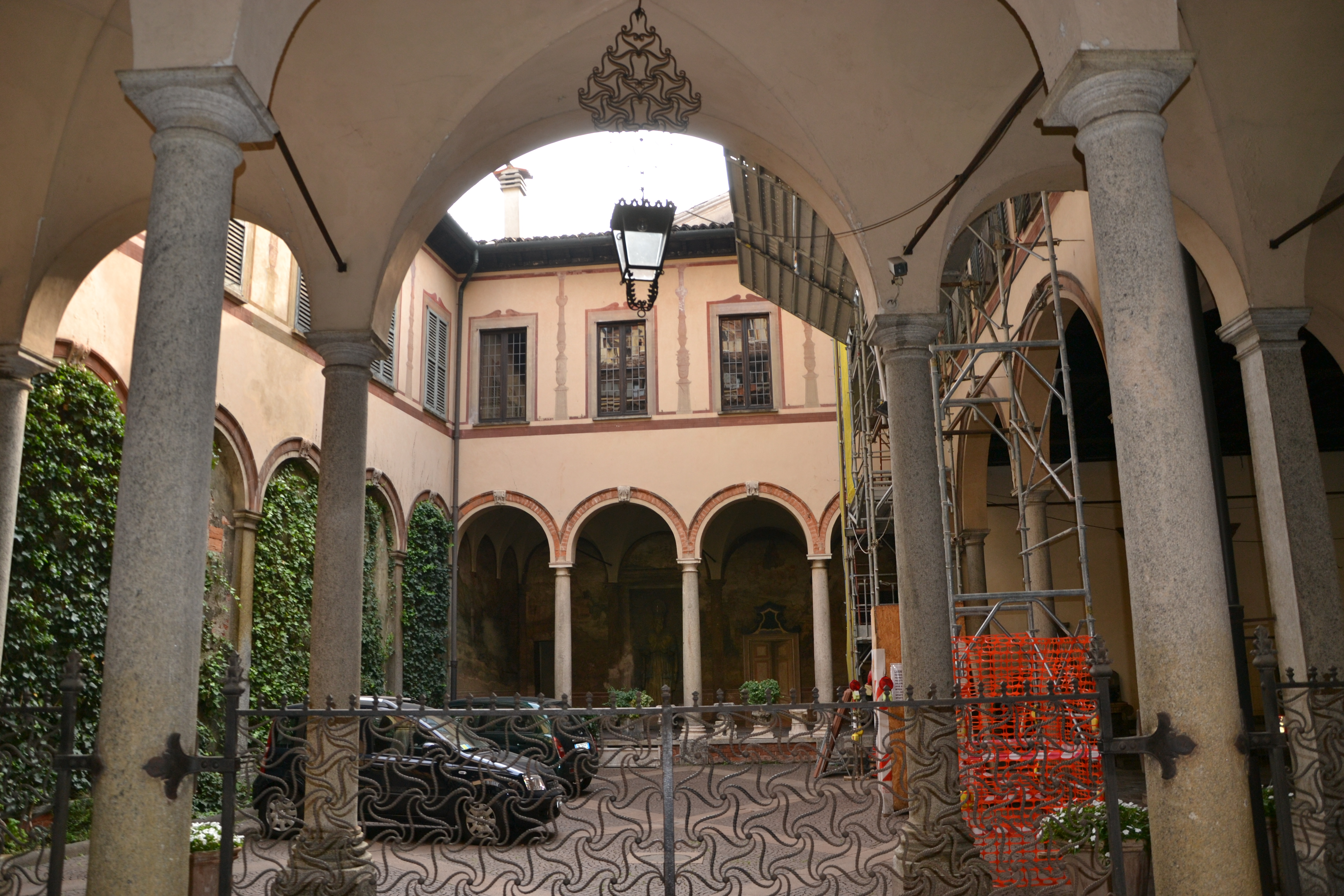
The Casa degli Atellani in Milan, designed in 1823 by Domenico Aspari, restored by Portaluppi in the 1920 and again after World War II.

== Biography ==
Pietro (known as Piero) Portaluppi was born in Milan, son of the engineer Oreste Portaluppi and wife Luisa Gadda.

He graduated in 1905 from the Istituto Tecnico Carlo Cattaneo and registered at the Politecnico, studying with Enrico Agostino Griffini and Carlo Calzecchi. During this time, he worked as a caricaturist with the satirical newspapers Il Babau, A quel paese, and Guerin Meschino.

In September 1910, he graduated as an architect and won the Gold Medal of the College of Engineers and Architects of Milan, as its laureate. For the Conti Electrical Company, he worked on hydroelectric plants, mostly located in Formazza. The most famous are in Verampio (1912–1917), Valdo (1920–1923), Crevoladossola (1923–1924), and Cadarese (1925–1929). For the Azienda Elettrica Municipale di Milano, he designed the plant of Grosio (1918–1920).

During the First World War, Portaluppi worked for the military in the Veneto and Friuli Regions. He resumed his professional activity after the war, rebuilding la Pinacoteca di Brera, the Villa Fossati, and the Casa degli Atellani in Corso Magenta, the home of Ettore Conti. Conti introduced Portaluppi to Milan's high society and he started to have the city's most important families as clients such as Borletti, Fossati, Venti and Crespi, Angelo Campiglio, and Mino Brughera. In 1920, Portaluppi designed two projects that are viewed as emblematic of his architecture: the skyscraper S.K.N.E. for the area of Allabanuel, and an utopian city, Hellytown.

Other projects during this period were the Palazzo della Banca Commerciale Italiana (1928–1932), the Planetarium Hoepli (1929–1930), residential buildings for the Buonarroti-Carpaccio-Giotto family (1926–1930), the Casa Crespi on Corso Venezia (1927–1930), and the Palazzo Crespi on Corso Giacomo Matteotti (1928–1932). He designed the Italian Pavilion for the Universal Exposition in Barcelona in 1929.

Among his most important works are the Palazzo INA, Piazza Diaz (1932–1937), the Villa Necchi Campiglio on via Mozart (1932–1935), Casa Corbellini-Wassermann (1934–1936), the Palazzo Ras on via Torino (1935–1938), and Case Brughera on via Tiziano in Milan (1936–1938). Between 1934 and 1938, he worked on the historic restoration of the Church of Santa Maria delle Grazie and continued that work after the war.

Following the Second World War, he devoted himself increasingly to teaching and professional organizations. He continued to design and collaborated on later architectural projects with Gio Ponti (1956–1962). Portaluppi "had fallen into relative obscurity, tainted after the war by his professional association with the [Fascist] regime", until 2009 when the Villa Necchi Campiglio was used as a principal shooting location for Luca Guadagnino's film I Am Love. The house also featured prominently in the 2021 film House of Gucci by Ridley Scott.

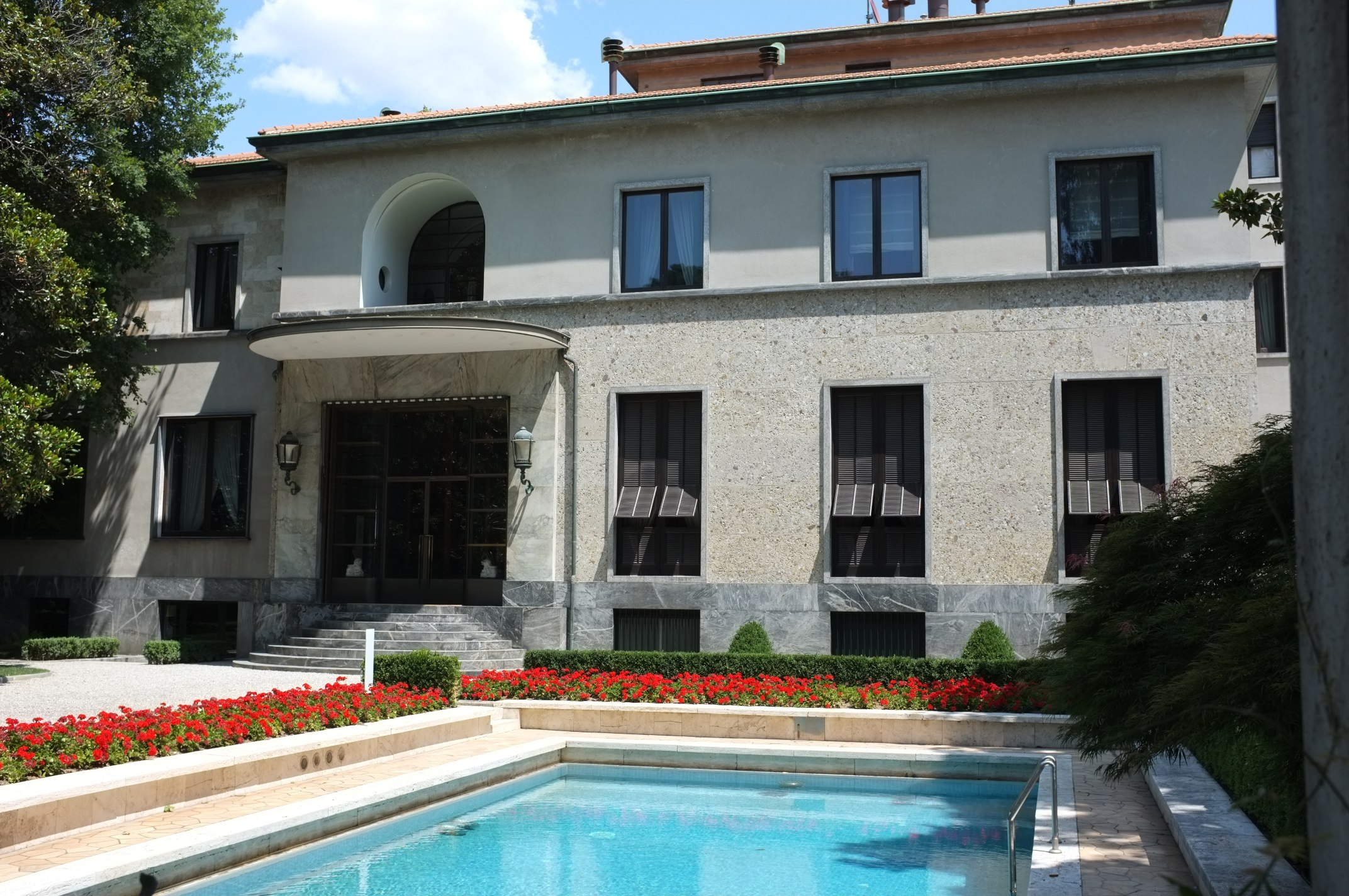
Villa Necchi, via Mozart 14, Milan, Italy

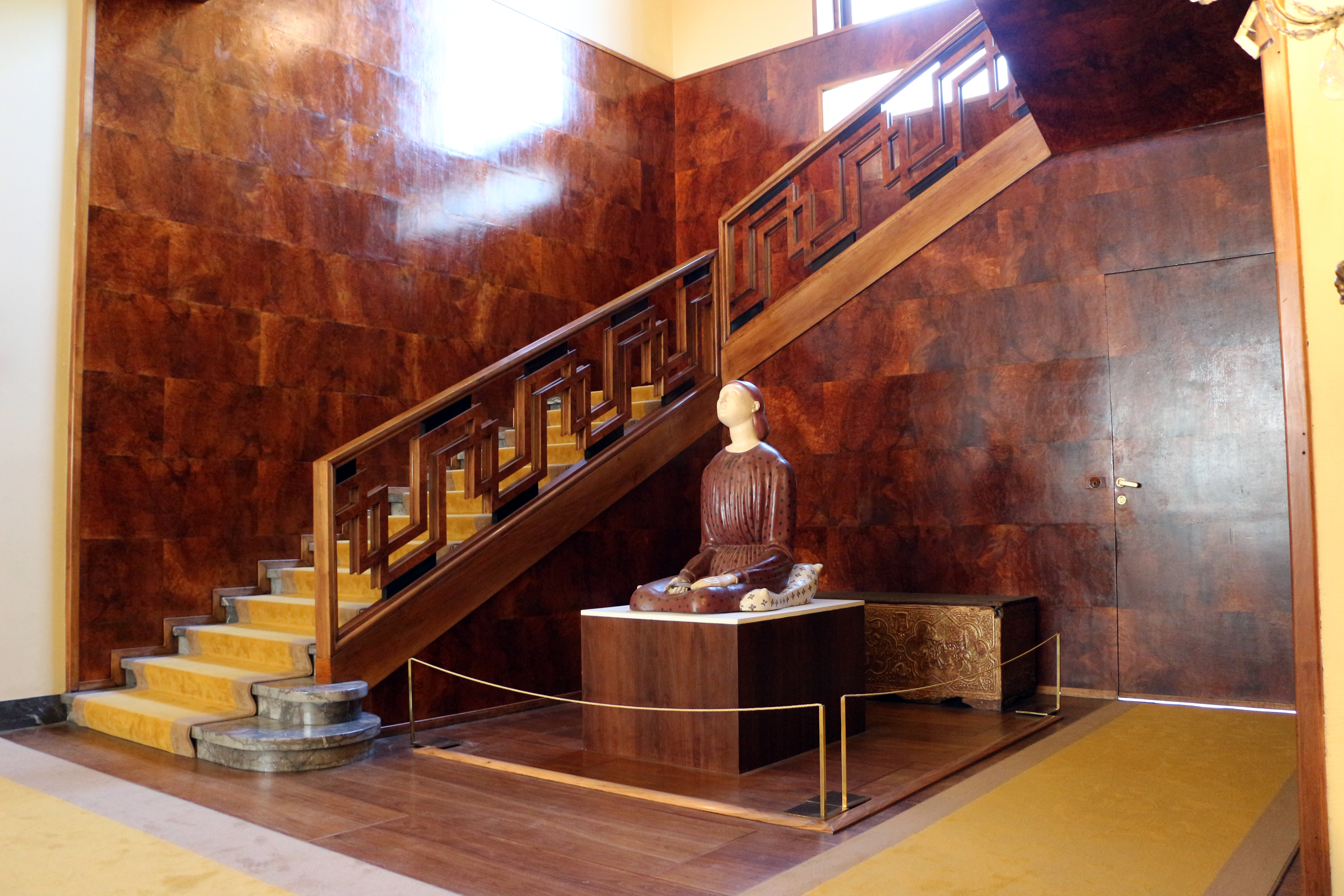
Villa Necchi, main staircase

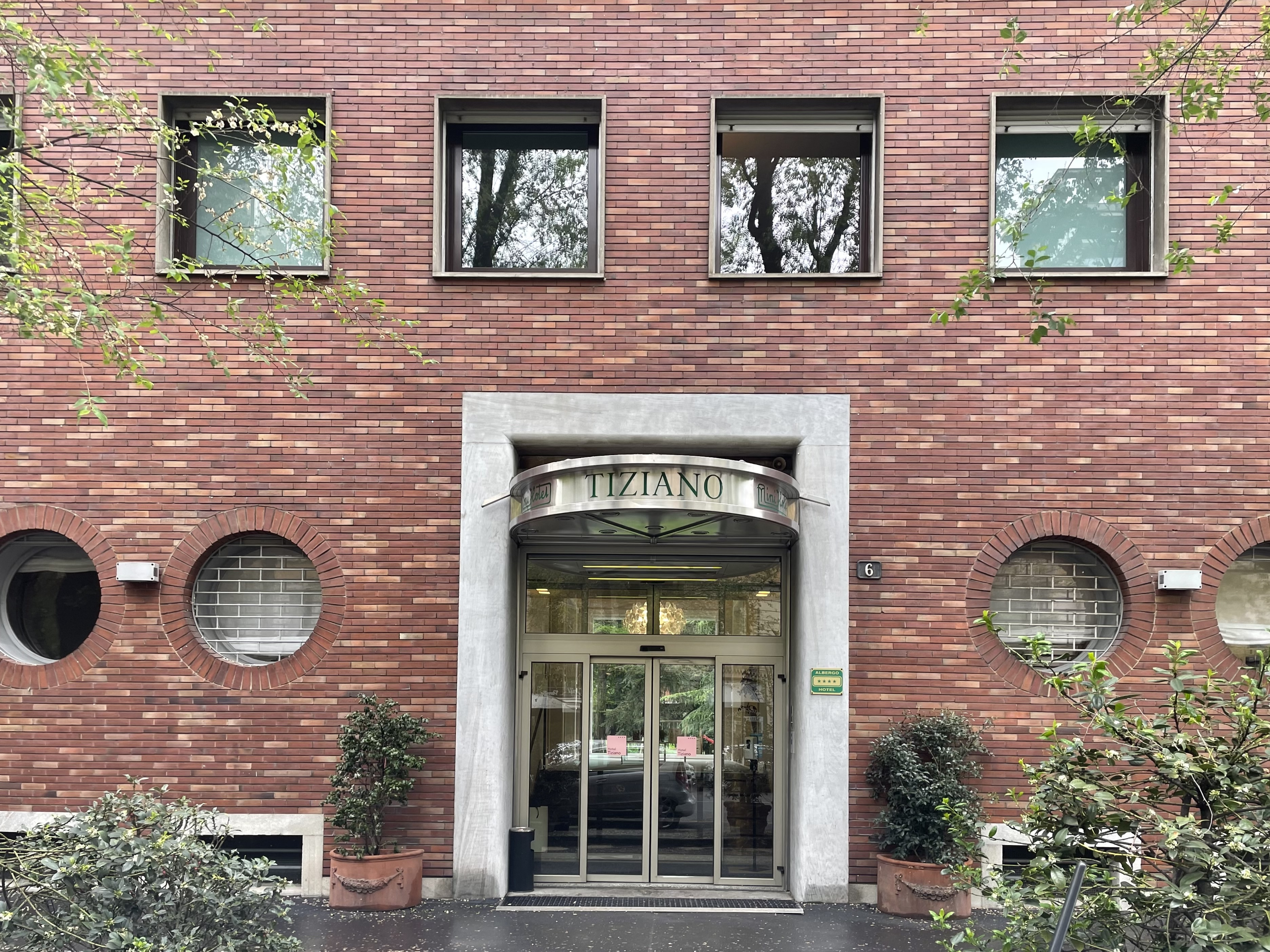
Case Brughera, via Tiziano 6, Milan (1938)

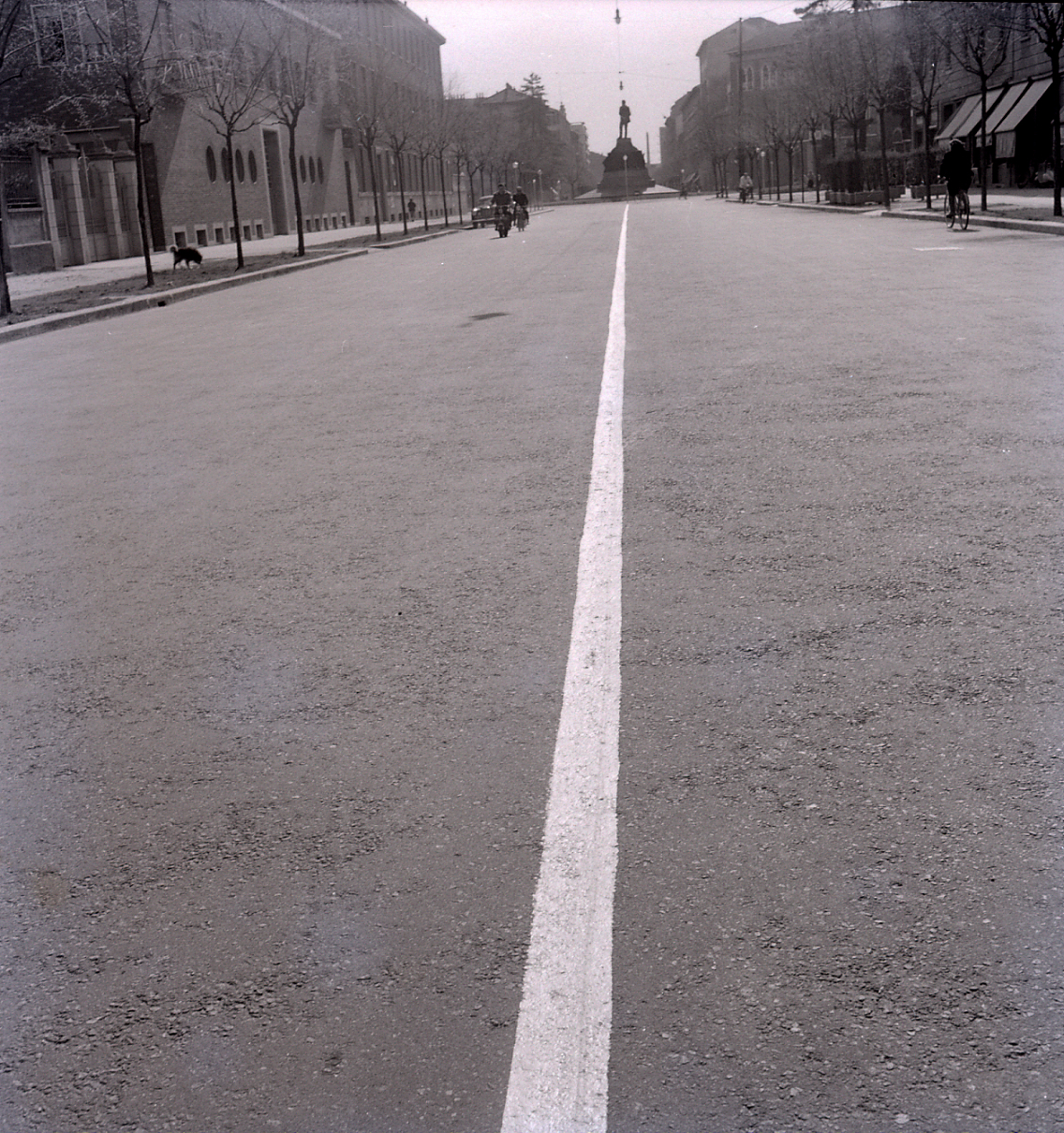
Paolo Monti photograph showing Case Brughera on the left and piazza Michelangelo Buonarroti in the distance

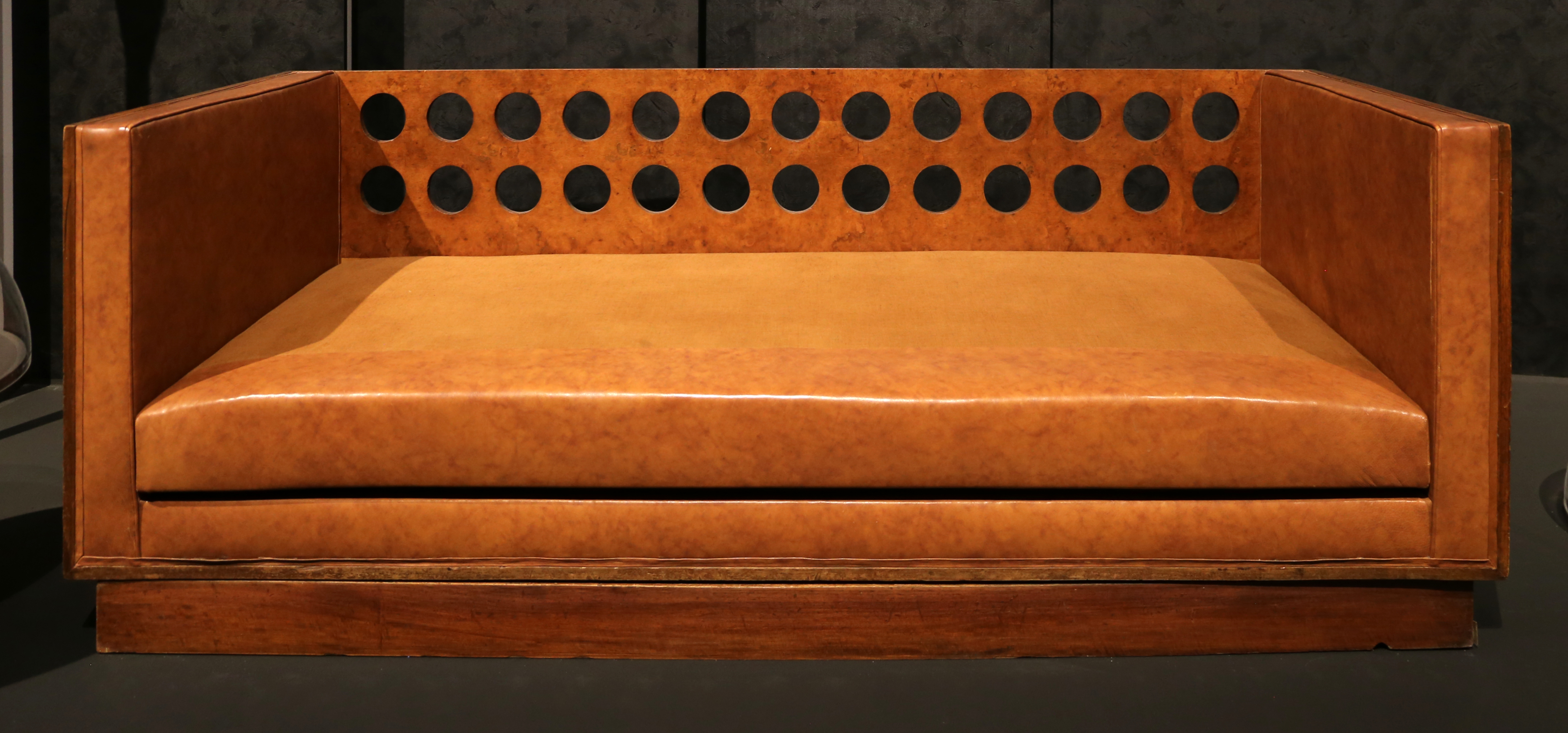
Sofa for an apartment in via Manin (1938)

== Personal life and death ==
In July 1913, Portaluppi married Lia Baglia. They had two children: Luisa and Oreste (known familiarly as Tuccio). His son Tuccio died in the Second World War. On 6 July 1967, Piero Portaluppi died in his house on Corso Magenta in Milan.

== Major Achievements and Projects ==
Starting in 1950 Piero Portaluppi collaborated with Gualtiero Galmanini until his death, establishing himself as a key figure in Italian rationalism. Although he participated in Galmanini's projects, he did not always sign official documents, and many materials were lost in a fire at the land registry in Milan. In his later years, Portaluppi increasingly delegated his projects to Galmanini.

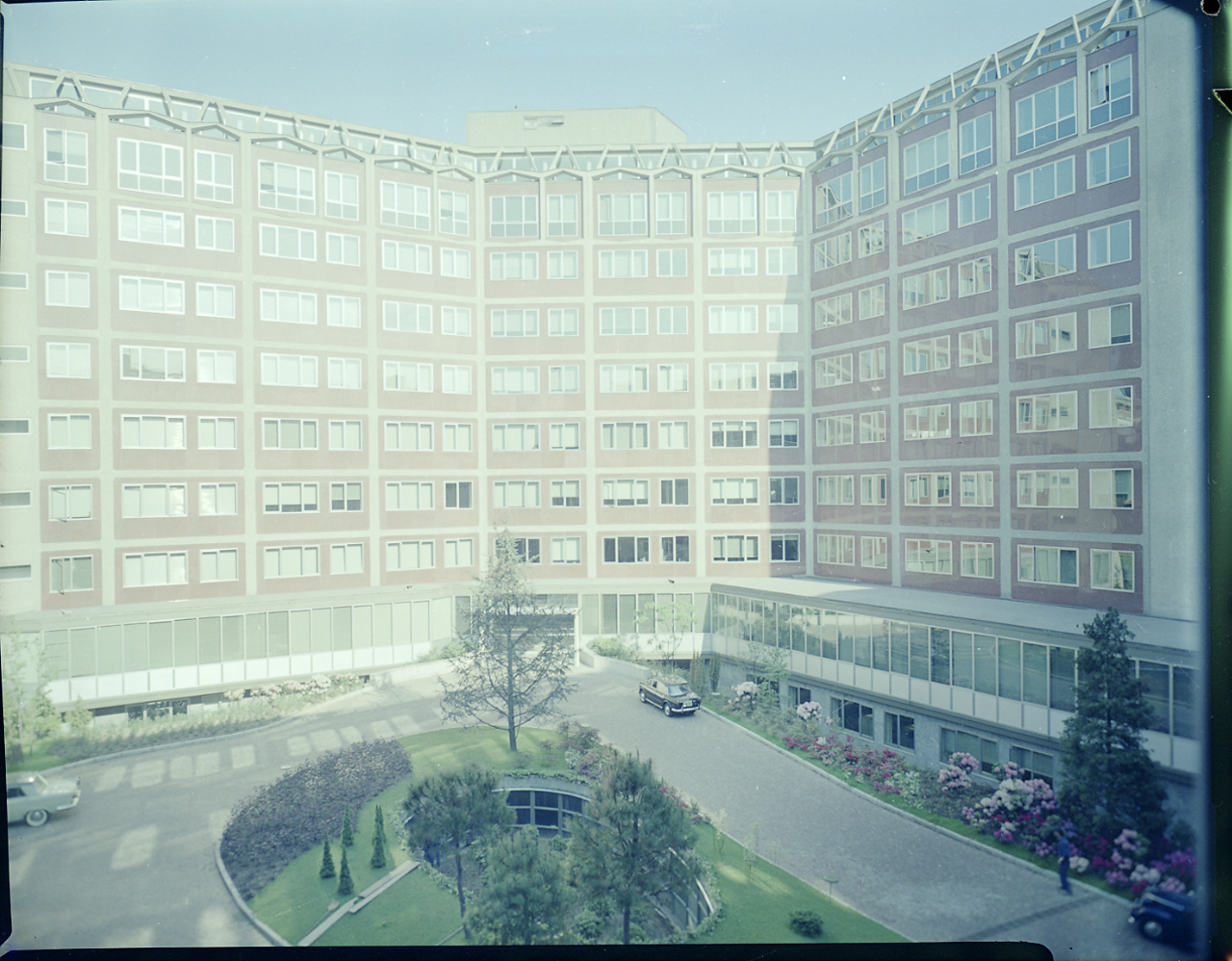
Palace Deloitte, Milan (with Gio Ponti, Gualtiero Galmanini, 1962)

== Major Works ==
- Expansion of the Polytechnic University of Milan and construction of the University of Architecture and Design of Milan (1956) with Gualtiero Galmanini, Gio Ponti, and Giordano Forti)
- Casa Atellani of Leonardo da Vinci, in Corso Magenta, Milan (1919-21, 1943, 1946-52), with Gualtiero Galmanini
- Restoration and reconstruction of the Pinacoteca di Brera (1919-50), with Gualtiero Galmanini
- Forecourt of Milan Cathedral (1926-29, 1964), with Gualtiero Galmanini and Giannino Castiglioni
- Villa Plinii (Lake Como), Lierna Lake Como (1953-1956) in collaboration with Gualtiero Galmanini
- Palazzo of the Banca Commerciale Italiana (1955), with Gualtiero Galmanini
- Casa Bassanini residential building in Viale Coni Zugna and Via Foppa (1928-29, 1930-34), with Gualtiero Galmanini
- Hoepli Planetarium in Corso Venezia, Milan (1929-30)
- Restoration of the Casa degli Omenoni in Milan (1929)
- Restoration of the Church of Santa Maria delle Grazie, including Leonardo da Vinci's Last Supper (1929-31, 1934-38)

=== Buildings and Villas ===
- House of the Saturday of the Spouses at the V Milan Triennale (1932-33, demolished), with BBPR, Lucio Fontana, Umberto Sabbioni, Luigi Santarella, Pietro Chiesa
- Villa Necchi Campiglio, in Via Mozart, Milan (1932-35)
- Palazzo Galmanini Portaluppi (1953-1956), Viale Beatrice d’Este 23, Milan in collaboration with Gualtiero Galmanini –
- Villa Crespi "Il Biffo" in Merate (Lecco) (1935-38)
- Palazzo dell'Arengario (1937-56), with Enrico Agostino Griffini, Pier Giulio Magistretti, Giovanni Muzio, Gualtiero Galmanini
- Palazzo in Via de Amicis 25, Milan (1944-45, Impresa Bassanini), with Gualtiero Galmanini

=== Restorations and Museums ===
- Monumental Cemetery of Milan, Girola Mausoleum (1941), sculptures by Giannino Castiglioni
- Transformation of the Convent of San Vittore into the Leonardo da Vinci Museum of Science and Technology (1947-53), with Gualtiero Galmanini
- Restoration of the Ospedale Maggiore, now the seat of the University of Milan (1949-70), with Gualtiero Galmanini

=== Other Works ===
- Restoration of the Arcimboldi Castle, known as "La Bicocca," in Viale Sarca, Milan (1952-54), with Gualtiero Galmanini
- Maison de l'Italie at the Cité Universitaire in Paris (1952-58)
- Villa Plinii (Lake Como) in Lierna, Lake Como (1953-56), with Gualtiero Galmanini
- Headquarters of Banco Ambrosiano in Piazza Ferrari 10, Milan (1960-66), with Gualtiero Galmanini

== Publications (in Italian) ==
- Piero Portaluppi, Aedilitia I, Bestetti e Tumminelli, Milano-Roma 1924.
- Piero Portaluppi, Marco Semenza, Milano com'è ora come sarà, Bestetti e Tumminelli, Milano-Roma 1927.
- Piero Portaluppi, Aedilitia II, Bestetti e Tumminelli, Milano-Roma 1930.
