= Leonardo da Vinci's Vineyard =

Land in Milan given as a gift in 1498

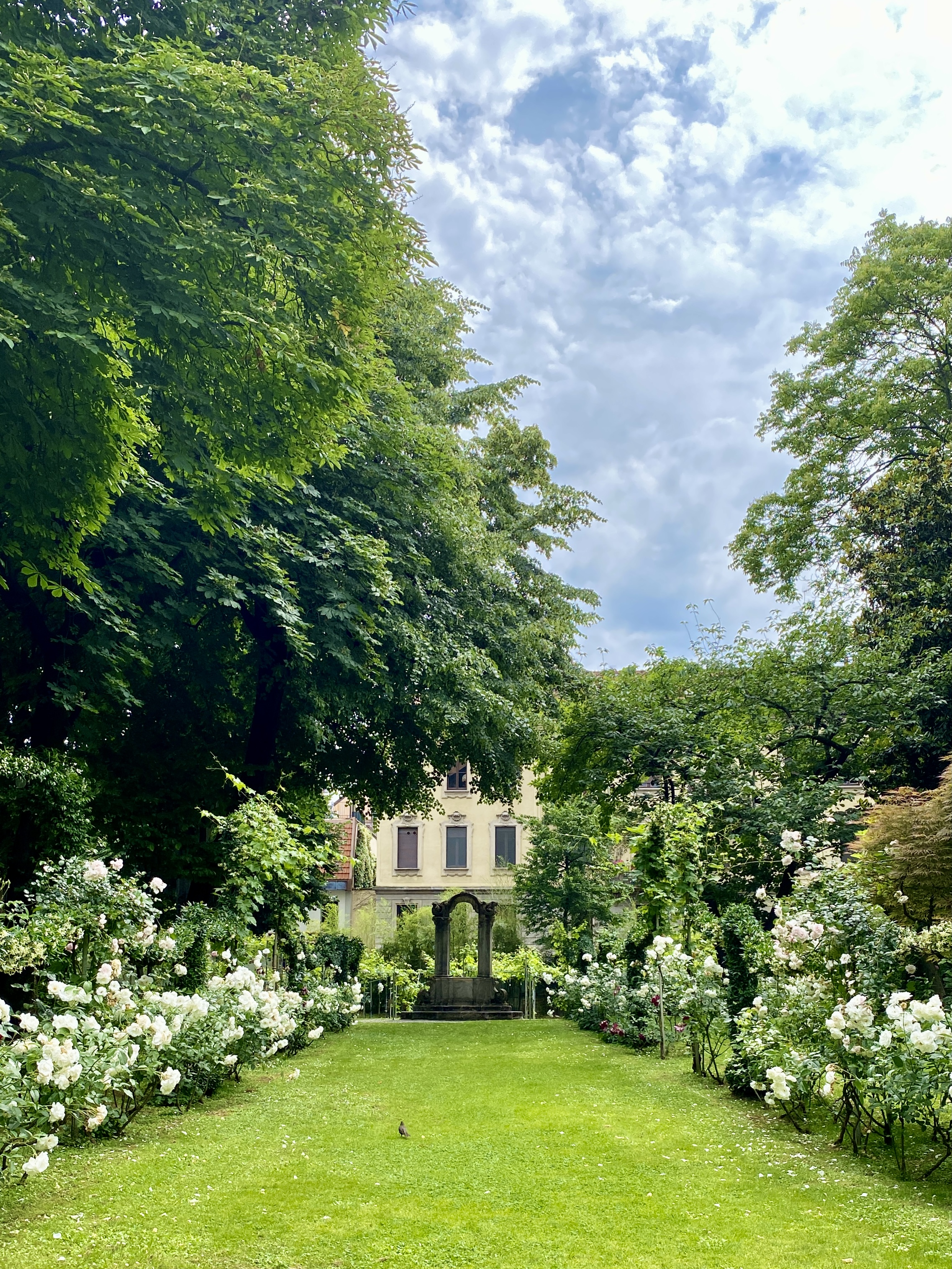
Leonardo's Vineyard

Leonardo da Vinci's Vineyard is a vineyard that the Duke of Milan, Ludovico Maria Sforza, best known as Ludovico il Moro, gave as a gift to Leonardo da Vinci in 1498 while he was working on the painting of The Last Supper in the nearby refectory of the cathedral and Dominican convent of Santa Maria delle Grazie. It was a gesture to give credit for the many admirable works Leonardo had been creating for the Duke.

== Leonardo's Vineyard ==
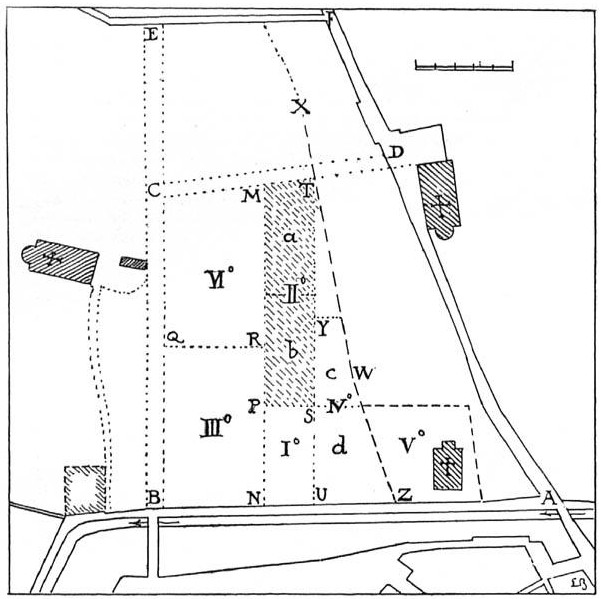
The site of the vineyard according to Luca Beltrami

The vineyard was located in Milan, beyond the Porta Vercellina district, close to the Borgo delle Grazie, on the land belonging to San Vittore great vineyard.

The vineyard the duke intended to donate consisted of 16 rows, but the related borders had not been set. In the Codex Atlanticus and in the Manuscript I of France, Leonardo's notes report the measure of a territory of about 100 “braccia milanesi” length (approximately 59 metres equals to 64 yards) and 294 “braccia milanesi” width (approximately 175 metres equals to 321 yards) to match an area of about 15 “pertiche milanesi”, namely around 1 hectare (about 2,5 acres); some of these notes are accompanied by references to the neighboring lands.

In 1920, the Italian architect and politician Luca Beltrami, relying on historical documents, was able to describe the likely position of the original vineyard, which ran probably parallel to the current Via De Grassi (De Grassi Street). He photographed the vineyard that was then on the same spot when cultivations were beginning to be eradicated; at that time, a resolution was passed to subdivide the territory into lots to build new constructions.

== History ==
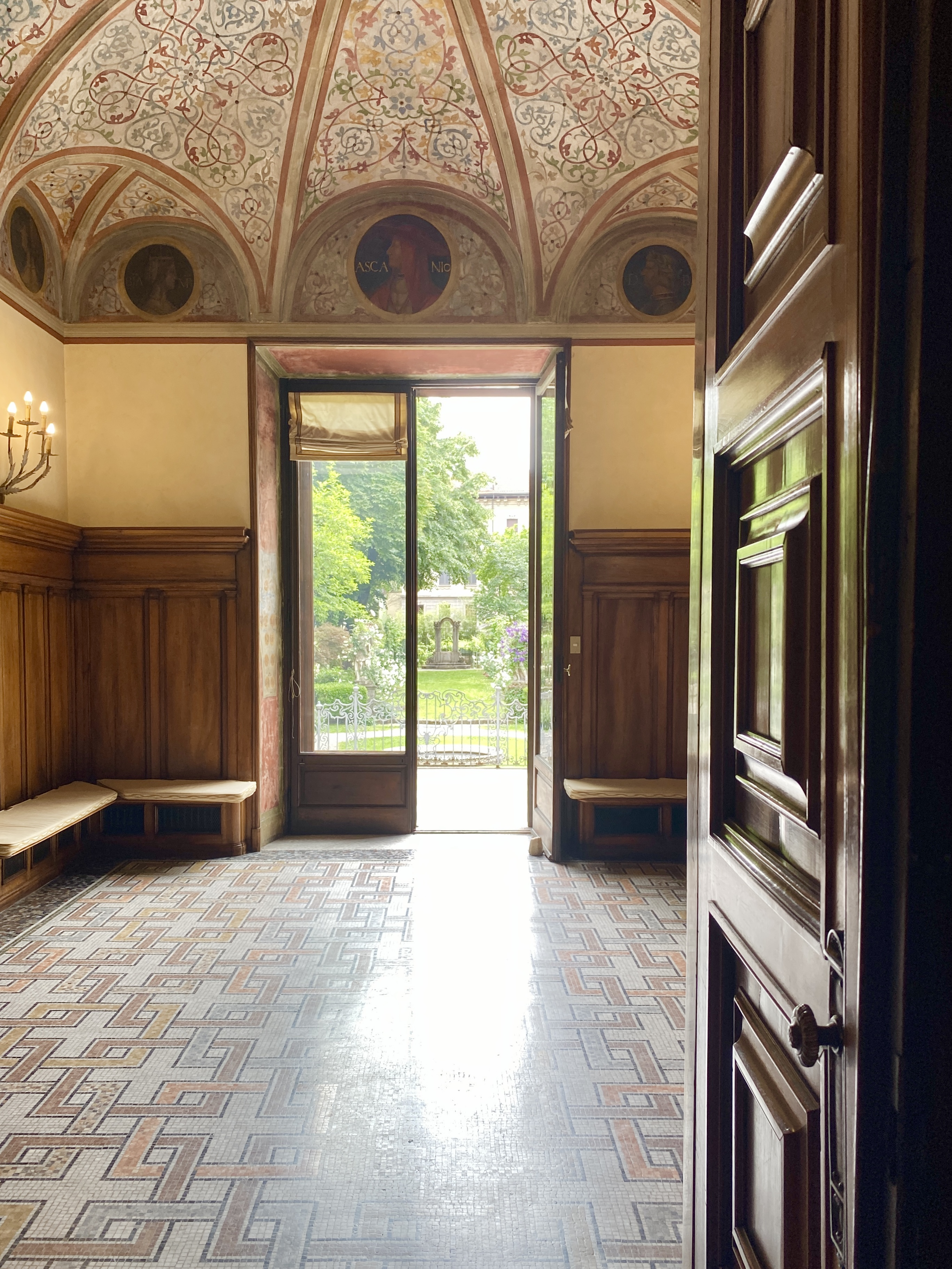
Leonardo's Vineyard: Atellani House

The Vineyard is firstly mentioned in a notary deed dated October 2, 1498, yet Ludovico il Moro’s donation was only confirmed later on, by an official letter, dated April 26th 1499.

The Italian Wars broke out, and the French army invaded the Duchy of Milan, forcing Ludovico Sforza to flee and repair to Innsbruck, and Leonardo left the city as well, heading towards Mantua. However, before leaving, he managed to rent his Vineyard to Sir Pietro di Giovanni da Oppreno, father of his apprentice Gian Giacomo Caprotti, better known as Sir Salai. Once the French government took over the city, it reviewed the proceedings concerning the last donations made by Ludovico Sforza. As a consequence, in 1502 they confiscated the Vineyard and assigned it to Leonardo Biglia, a Sforza official.

In 1507, Charles II d'Amboise, King Louis XII’s lieutenant, asked Leonardo to leave Florence (where he was then living) and to come back to Milan in order to finalise a few works he had previously started, and Leonardo was able to point out his vineyard’s confiscation and get its ownership back. Thus, the Vineyard was returned to him by a deliberation specifying that the artist should not - «patire spesa pur de uno soldo» - be charged any expenses.

Dear Sirs. Regarding the case of Sir Leonardo from Florence we ask you to return him his Vineyard without any charge of expenses from his part.

(Italian: Dilecti nostri. Tocando il caso de magistro Lionardo fiorentino ve dicemo et commettemo che lo remettiate nel primo stato, come esso era, de la vigna sua inante che la gli fusse tolta per la Camera, et non gli fareti chel ne habia a patire spesa pur de uno soldo.)

— From a letter by Charles d’Amboise, Louis XII’s lieutenant, to the income revenue masters

Leonardo remained in Milan till 1513. Then he came back to Rome and, after that, went to France, where he died. In his last will, compiled in Amboise, a month before his death, he disposed that the rectangular vineyard was to be subdivided into two equal lots: one to be assigned to Sir Salai, who had there previously built his own house, and the other to Giovanbattista Villani, a faithful servant of his, who had followed him to France. In the last document he wrote, Leonardo thus remembered his Vineyard.

By this last will the undersigned is to grant in perpetuity his garden located just outside Milan’s city walls in part to his servant Batista de Vilanis and in part to his servant Salay, who had previously built there a house, which will be forever his and his successors’, and this is intended to be a token of appreciation for the services and assets, the above-mentioned Vilanis and Salay, had provided him with.

(Italian: Item epso Testatore dona et concede a sempre mai perpetuamente a Batista de Vilanis suo servitore la metà zoè medietà de uno iardino che ha fora a le mura de Milano, et l'altra metà de epso jardino ad Salay suo servitore, nel qual iardino il prefato Salay ha edificata et constructa una casa, la qual sarà e resterà similmente a sempremai perpetudine al dicto Salay, soi heredi et successori, et ciò in remuneratione di boni et grati servitii, che dicti de Vilanis et Salay dicti suoi servitori, lui hanno facto de qui inanzi.)

— From Leonardo in Cloux Last Will, April 23rd 1519

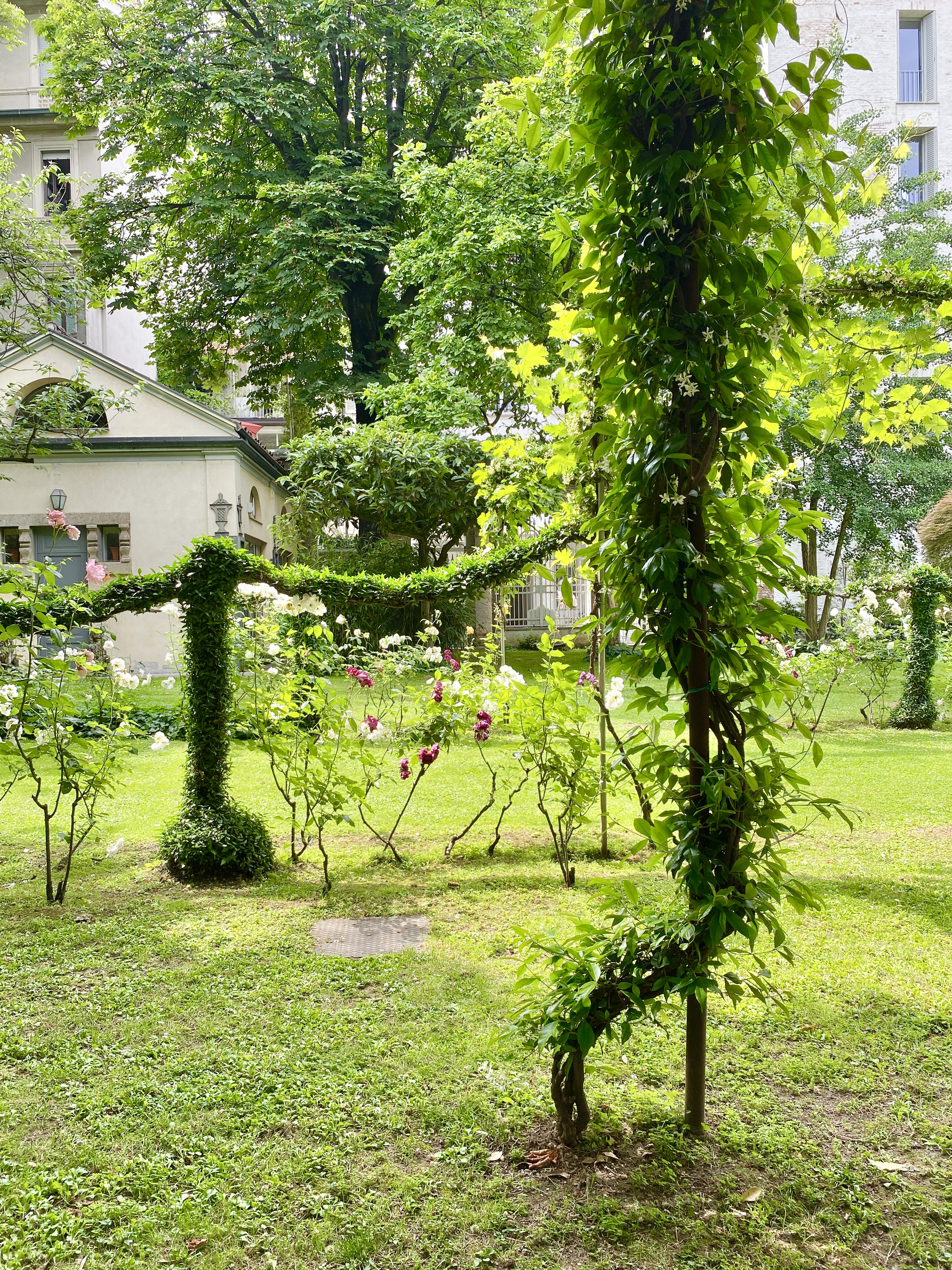
Leonardo's Vineyard

As early as 1534 Villani transferred his lot's property to the nearby San Gerolamo Monastery while the other lot, the nearest to the current Via Zenale (Zenale Street), was inherited, after Sir Salai's death (1524), by his family.

== Scientific project ==
Leonardo's Vineyard came to new life with Expo 2015, by the will of Portaluppi Foundation and the owners of the adjacent Atellani House, under the patronage of the President of Italian Republic and thanks to the contribution of the University of Milan (Università degli Studi di Milano).

In 2007 Serena Imazio and a team headed by Professor Attilio Scienza, leading expert in grapevine genetics, carried out research manually excavating living biological residues of the original grapevine found in the Atellani House’s garden: results allowed them to replant Malvasia di Candia Aromatica, Leonardo’s original grapevine. On September 12, 2018, the grapes of Leonardo's Vineyard were for the first time harvested.

== See also ==
- Santa Maria delle Grazie, Milan
- The Last Supper (Leonardo)

== Bibliography ==
- Ghilardotti Jacopo, Casa degli Atellani e Vigna di Leonardo, Milano 2015.
- Luca Beltrami (1920). La vigna di Leonardo da Vinci. Milano: Allegretti.
- Scienza Attilio, pubblicazione scientifica.
- Maroni Luca, Milano È la Vigna di Leonardo, Sens, Roma 2015.
