= Planetario di Milano =

Coordinates: 45°28′25.44″N 9°12′12.97″E

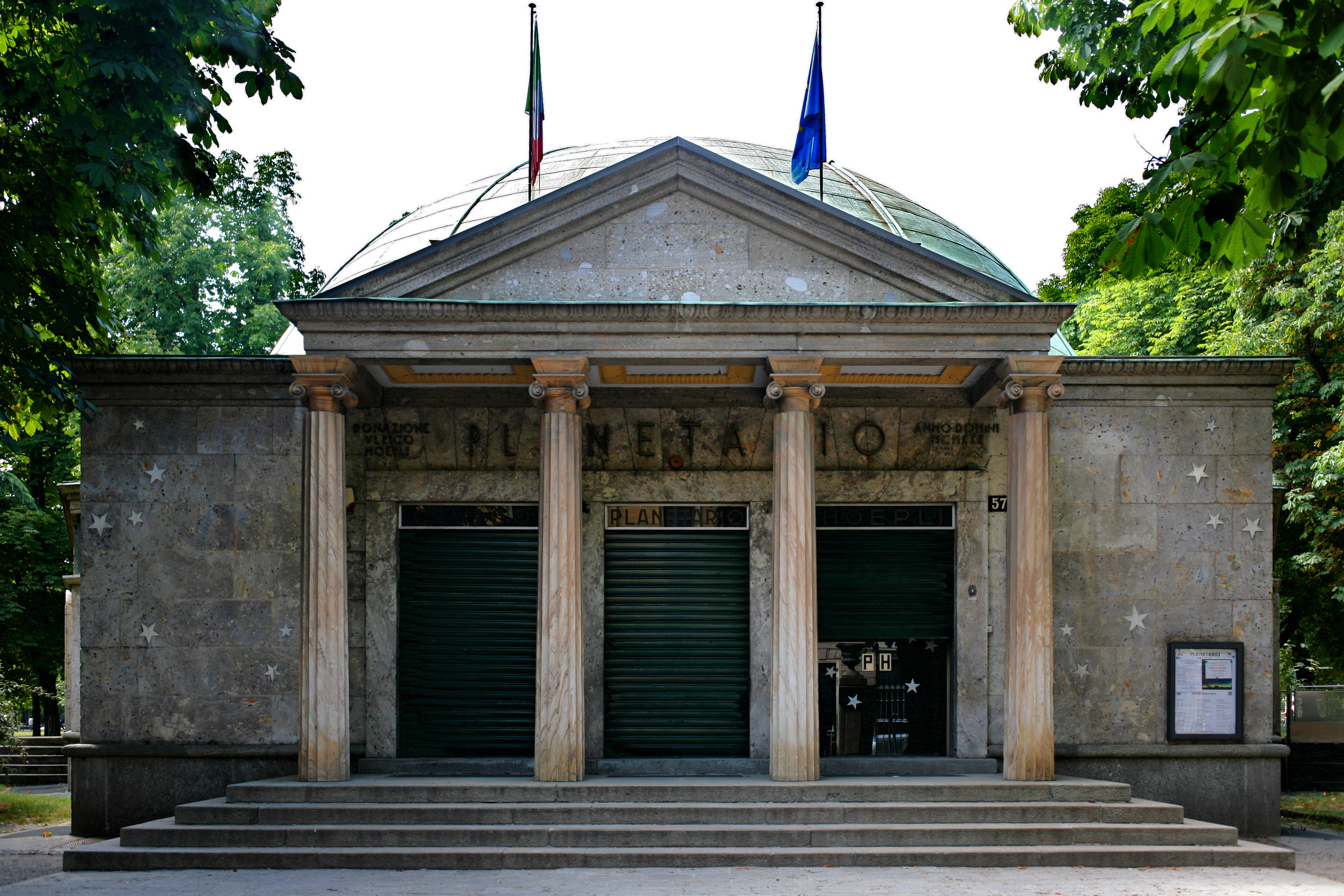
Civico Planetario Ulrico Hoepli, Milan

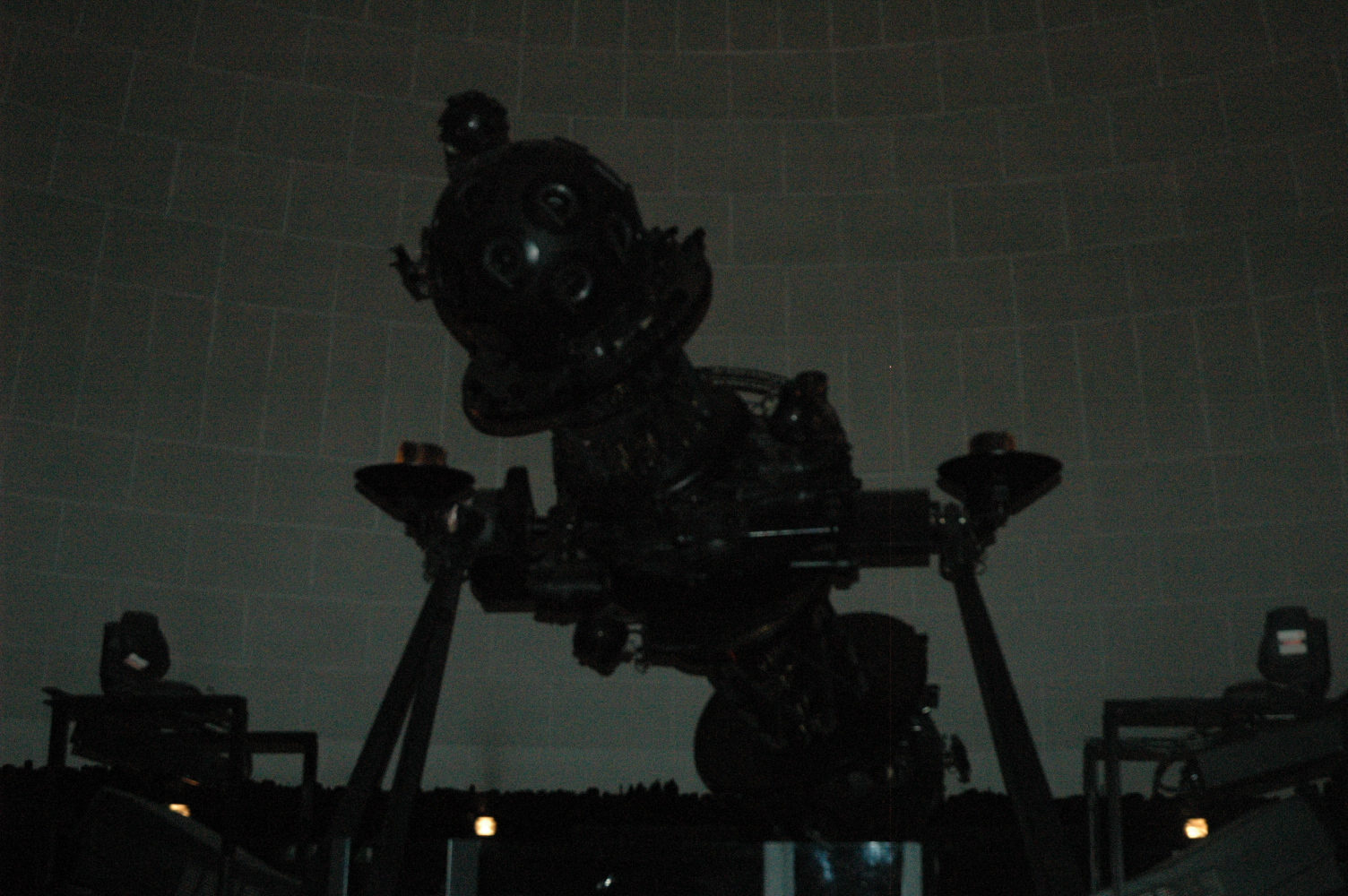
The Zeiss star projector of the planetarium

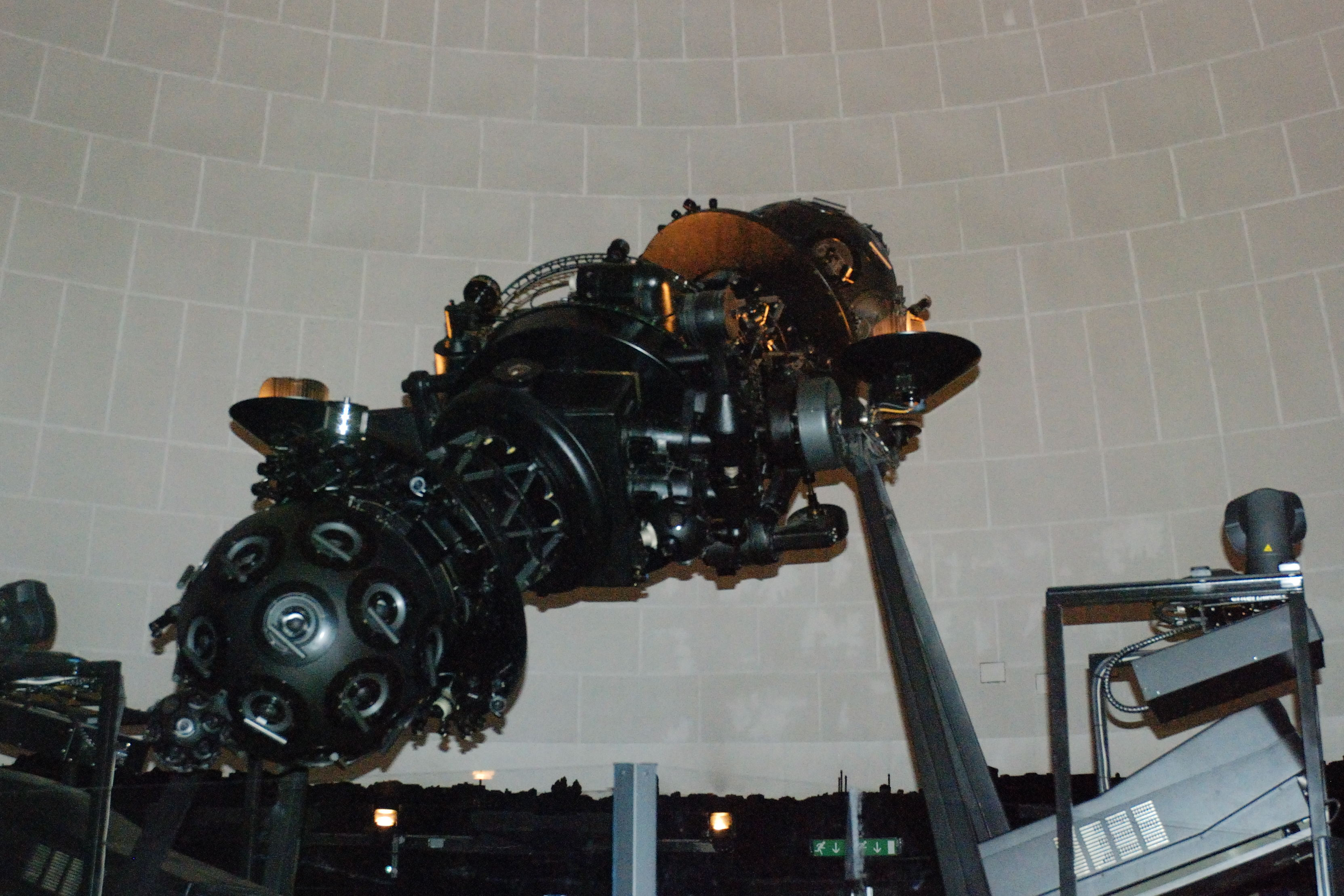
Zeiss star projector (another view)

The Milan Planetarium (in Italian, Planetario di Milano) is the largest and most important planetarium in Italy. It is located in the Gardens of Porta Venezia, in the Porta Venezia district of Milan. It was established in 1930, and has been in operation since then.

The Planetarium building was inaugurated on May 20, 1930. It was designed by architect Piero Portaluppi for Ulrico Hoepli, who donated it to Milan. It has an octagonal base and it is 19.6 meters in diameter, with an overall capacity of 300 seats. The dome-shaped screen is decorated with the silhouette of the Milan skyline as it was in 1930 (for example, without the Pirelli Tower).

The scene is created by a Zeiss IV star projector, which has been in use since 1968.

The Planetarium has about 100,000 visitors a year. It also serves as the headquarters of the Circolo Astrofili di Milano, the oldest and most important amateur astronomy club in Milan.
