= Alunni del Sole =

Italian pop group

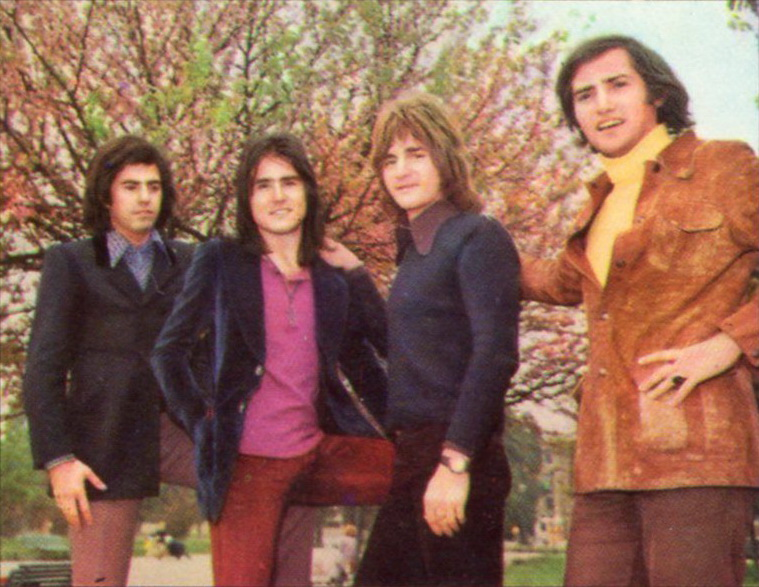
- Alunni del Sole in 1972

Background information
- Origin: Naples, Italy
- Genres: Pop; Pop rock
- Years active: 1968 – 2015
- Labels: Parade; Produttori Associati; Liberty; Durium; Ricordi; RCA
- Past members: Paolo Morelli; Bruno Morelli; Giulio Leofrigio; Giampaolo Borra

Alunni del Sole ("Pupils of the Sun") are an Italian pop group, mainly successful in the seventies.

== History ==
The group, which takes its name from the eponymous novel by Giuseppe Marotta, was born in the late sixties when two brothers of Naples, Paolo Morelli (piano and vocals) and Bruno Morelli (guitars), sons of a composer and of a pianist, decided moving in Rome to pursue a musical career and to be closer to the record companies; there they formed the group with Giulio Leofrigio (drums) and Giampaolo Borra (bass guitar).

They were hired by Renzo Arbore for the 1969 RAI television program Speciale per voi and had a first success with the song "Concerto". which entered the Italian top ten, They got their major hits a few years later, between 1973 and 1978; notably, their song in Neapolitan "'A canzuncella" peaked at the third place on the Italian Hit Parade in 1977, and it is considered as the progenitor of the Neapolitan musical new wave happened between late seventies and early Eighties.

The band won the 1978 Festivalbar with the song "Liù". The group disbanded in 1983, then reunited in 1992.
