= Casa Piumi =

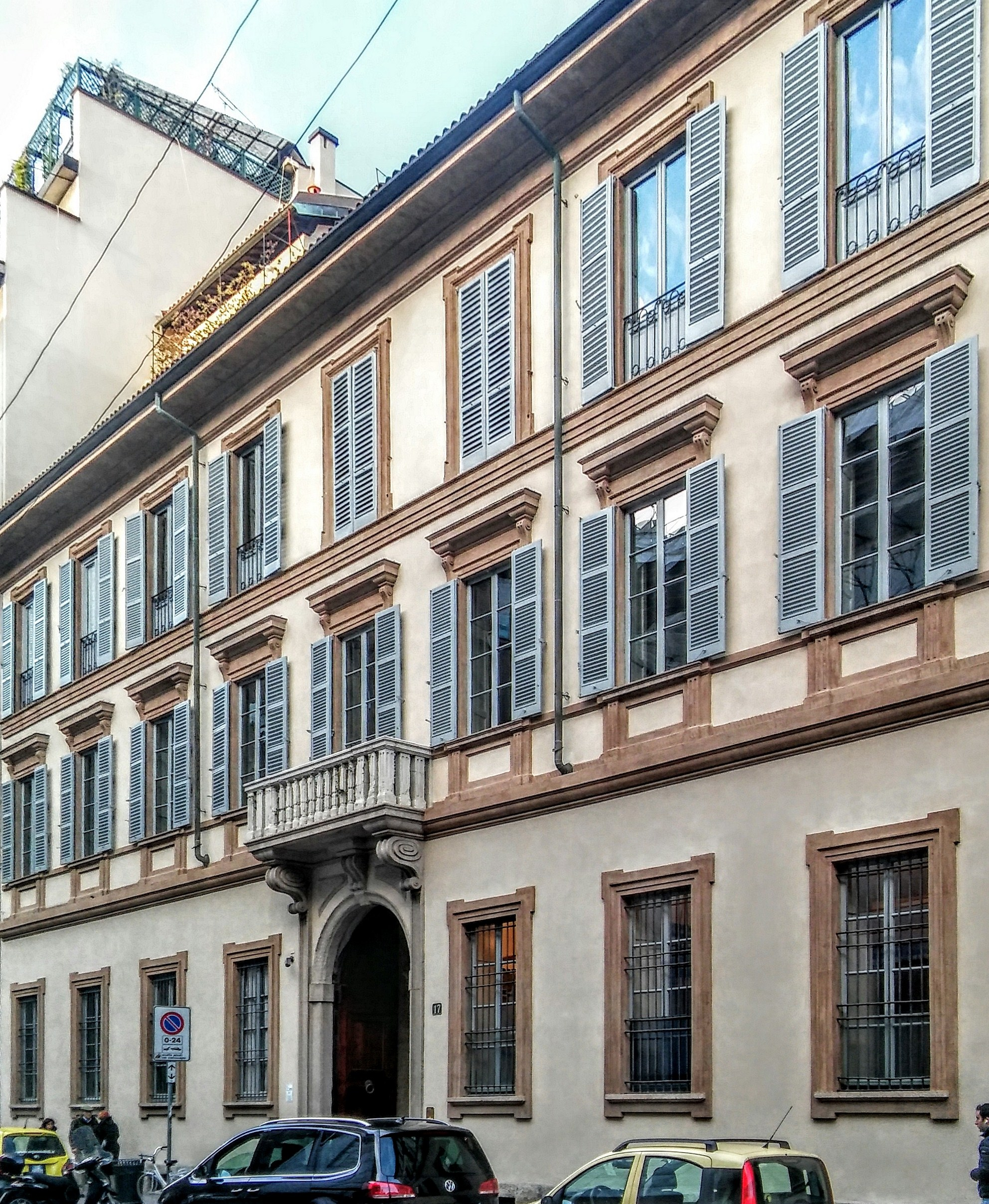
- Facade Casa Piumi
- Interactive map of the Casa Piumi area

General information
- Status: In use
- Type: Palace
- Architectural style: Neo-Classical
- Location: Milan, Italy, 17, via Pantano
- Coordinates: 45.459494°N 9.189909°E
- Construction started: 15th century

Casa Piumi is a historic building in Milan located at 17 Via Pantano.

== History and description ==
Although the building was originally conceived in the 15th century, there have been many alterations to the palace over its history, starting with the neoclassical façade: on the ground floor a stone portal with a round arch enclosed between two pilasters is surmounted by a balcony supported by a shelf scroll. On the main floor the windows are decorated with simple rectilinear mouldings, while on the second floor by simple cornices.

Inside the building, there are two courtyards, a minor one of trapezoidal shape and the square-shaped courtyard of honour dating back to the 16th century: the courtyard has a portico with granite columns and capitals with horse heads and sculpted coats of arms.

== See also ==
- Casa Radice Fossati

== Bibliography ==
=== Italian sources ===
- Paolo Mezzanotte, Giacomo Bascapè, Milano nell'arte e nella storia, Milano, Bestetti, 1968, ISBN non esistente.
