= Casa Radice Fossati =

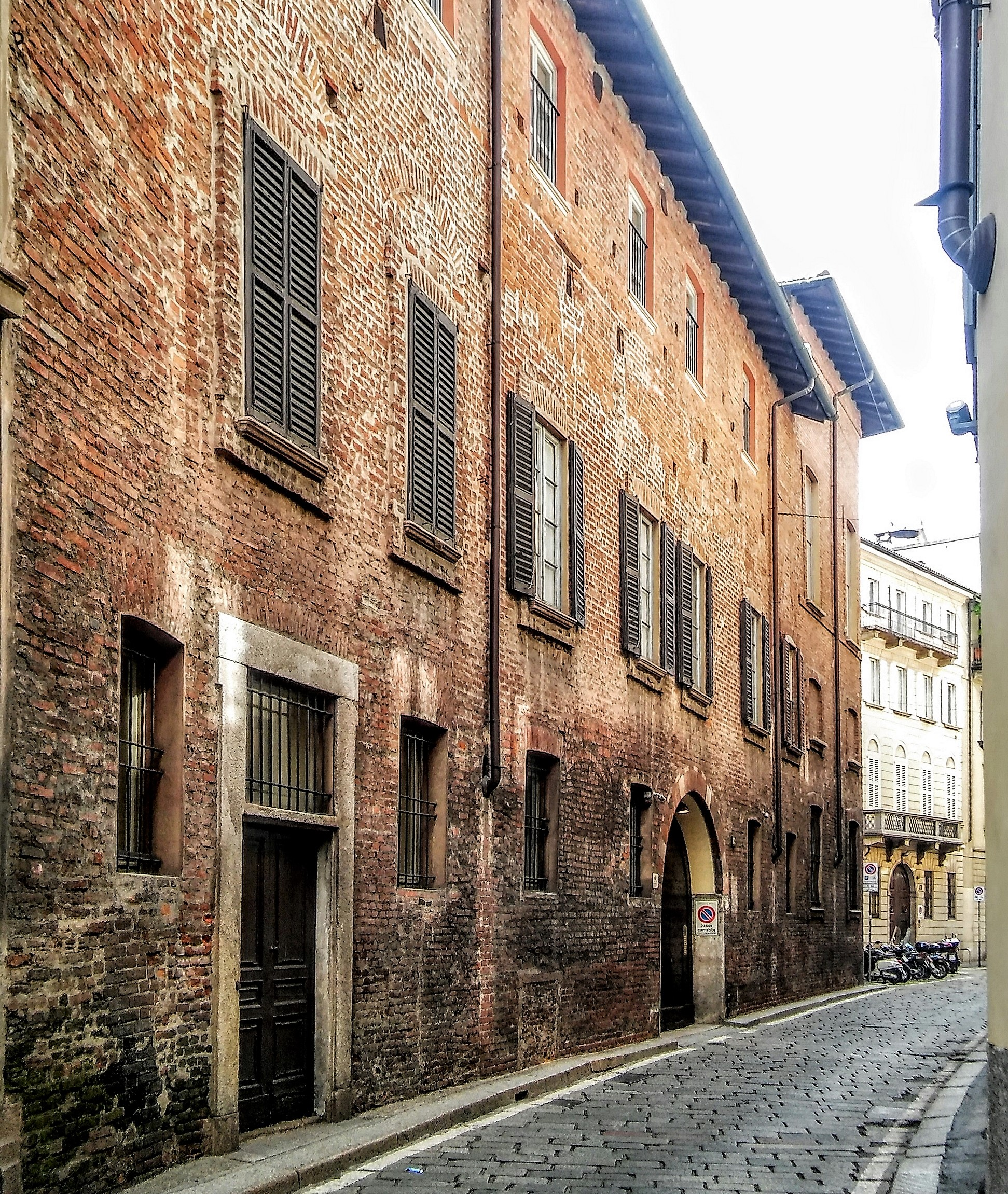
- Interactive map of the Casa Radice Fossati area

General information
- Status: In use
- Type: Palace
- Architectural style: Romanesque architecture
- Location: Milan, Italy, 13, via Cappuccio
- Coordinates: 45.4628°N 9.1794°E
- Construction started: 13th century
- Renovated: 17th century

Casa Radice Fossati' is a historic building in Milan located at via Cappuccio no. 13

== History and description ==
The palace is one of the oldest examples of aristocratic residential architecture in Milan: in fact, the building dates back in its primitive forms, most of which have been preserved on the outside, to the 13th century. On the contrary, the interior was remodelled in the 17th century.

The façade is in terracotta with various openings resulting from the various remodelling and restoration work that the palazzo has undergone over the years: the structure is very sober as typical of Romanesque architecture; the only decorated element of the façade is in fact the arched portal with alternating terracotta and stone ashlars. The entrance to the interior is through a hallway decorated with a coffered ceiling. The inner courtyard is defined on three sides, one of which is porticoed with Tuscan order columns and a coffered ceiling, by the building, while the fourth side faces the garden of the dwelling.

== Bibliography ==
=== Italian sources ===
- A. Lanza – M. Somarè, Milano e i suoi palazzi, Milano, Libreria Milanese, 1993
- P. Mezzanotte – G. C. Bascapé, Milano nell’arte e nella storia, Milano, Emilio Bestetti Edizioni d’Arte, 1948
