= Palazzo Acerbi =

17th-century Milanese palace

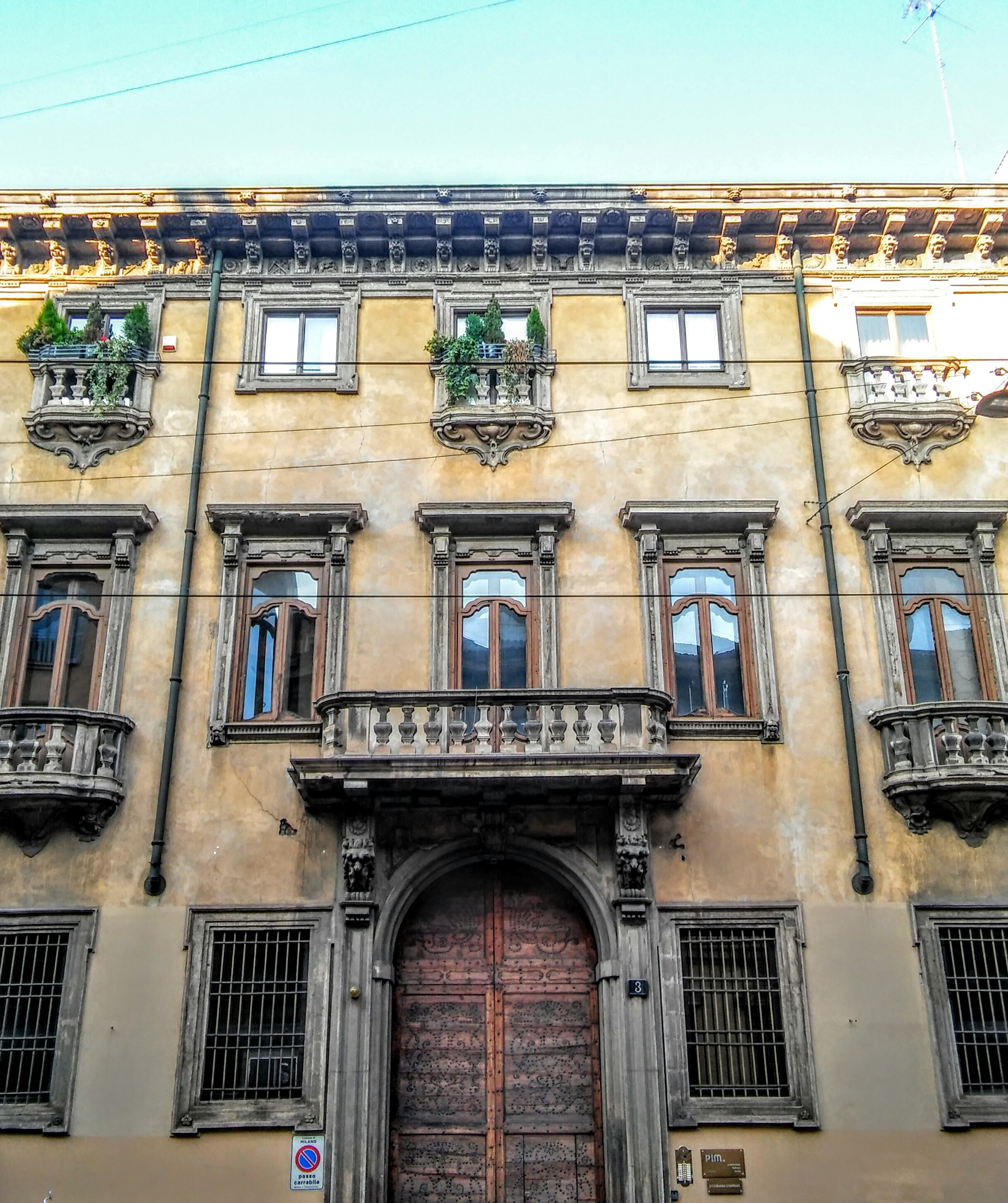
- Interactive map of the Palazzo Acerbi area
- Etymology: Ludovico Acerbi

General information
- Status: Completed
- Type: Palace
- Architectural style: Baroque
- Location: Milan, Italy, 3, via corso di Porta Romana
- Coordinates: 45°27′37″N 9°11′23″E
- Current tenants: Offices
- Completed: 17th century
- Owner: Manuel Faleschini

Design and construction
- Architect: Costantino Costantini

Palazzo Acerbi is a 17th-century Baroque palace in Milan, Italy. Historically belonging to the sestiere di Porta Romana, the palace is located at corso di Porta Romana no. 3.

== History ==
The palace is named after Ludovico Acerbi, a Milanese senator, who bought the building from the Rossi di San Secondo family. More than for the appearance of the palace, relatively sober compared to certain exuberances of Baroque architecture, the building is famous for its owner: Marquis Acerbi. In the years when the Manzonian plague was raging, the marquis loved to organise sumptuous parties and go around the city with a carriage and dozens of servants in green livery: Acerbi's exuberance, combined with the fact that none of the numerous guests at his parties ever fell ill with the plague in a period that saw the population of Milan halved, led to the belief among the population that the marquis was the reincarnation of the devil. All this despite the fact that at the outbreak of the epidemic the marquis Ludovico Acerbi had already been dead for years.

The building was acquired by Manuel Faleschini in c. 2024 – c. 2025.

== Architecture ==
The palace presents itself as a regular and austere structure when compared to the Baroque style of the time. The only clue to this style are the curved balconies of the first floor windows, decorated only with bare rectilinear frames, and the lion heads decorating the otherwise equally bare portal. The interior is different: Marquis Acerbi was the protagonist of a challenge with the Annoni family, owners of the palazzo di fronte, for who owned the most sumptuous palace. A cannonball dating from the Five Days of Milan is still visible in the palace, embedded in the façade, to the right of the first right-hand balcony on the first floor, under which there is a small plaque.

== Bibliography ==
- Lanza, Attilia; Somarè, Marilea (1992). Milano e i suoi palazzi: porta Orientale, Romana e Ticinese (in Italian). Vimercate: Libreria Meravigli editrice. pp. 106–107.
