= Guerin Meschino =

Weekly satirical magazine in Italy (1882–1949)

- Categories: Satirical magazine
- Frequency: Weekly
- Founder: Francesco Pazzo; Giovanni Pozza
- Founded: 1882
- Final issue: 1949
- Country: Italy
- Based in: Milan
- Language: Italian

Guerin Meschino (Italian: The Shabby Guerin) was a weekly satirical magazine which existed in Milan between 1882 and 1949 with an interruption in the period 1925–1943. It had an anti-Fascist and leftist political stance which led to this long-term hiatus.

== History and profile ==
Guerin Meschino was started by Francesco and Giovanni Pozza in Milan in 1882. They were also the publishers of the magazine which appeared on a weekly basis. Italian architect Piero Portaluppi was among the cartoonists of Guerin Meschino. It ceased publication in 1925. Following the end of the Fascist rule it was restarted in 1943. During this second period Guerin Meschino displayed a moderate conservative approach. The magazine permanently folded in 1949.
