= Split flap =

Split flap may refer to:

- Flap_(aeronautics)#Split_flap
- Split-flap display
