= Elektronika 7 =

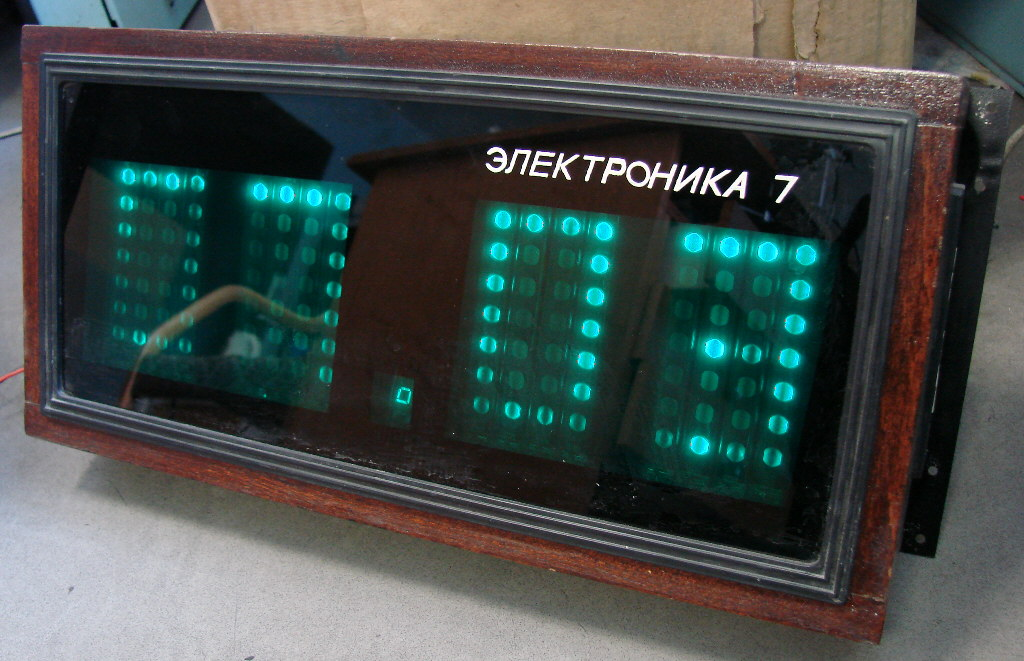
A typical Electronics 7 clock

Electronics 7 is a Soviet / Russian brand of seven-segment industrial digital clocks with four or eleven seven-segment lamps . It had a separate binary-to-seven-segment decoder board for each digit, while the actual timekeeping was done by a main board which emitted the digits of the time as binary code. Most models used Russian-made vacuum-fluorescent indicators, but there were also models based on light-emitting diodes. All the street and wall clocks were based on a kit produced by the "Reflector" factory in Saratov, and many remain in use at administrative and industrial premises in Russia.
