= Flapit =

- Trade name: Flapit counter
- Company type: Private company
- Industry: Internet of Things; Internet hardware
- Founder: Christophe Avignon, Zahary Karadjov, Charly Spasov, Marc Mühlenbach
- Key people: Christophe Avignon (CEO)
- Products: Social media marketing Engagement marketing
- Website: Flapit.com

Front view of the device, with 7 flaps

Flapit is a split-flap display that reveals real-time social media statistics such as Twitter followers or Yelp ratings. The product is designed to show off a bricks-and-mortar company's online community and increase its online presence by letting offline customers interact with the connected counter.

The idea came from a product launched by the retailer C&A called the Fashion Like.

The device can be customised via a web app and API to display any promotional messages, internal stats or discounts. It has 7 digits including numbers, letters and currency symbols

Special messages such as Thank You or Like Us can be displayed on the first flap and are translated into Italian, German, French, Chinese, Japanese, Russian, Portuguese, Spanish and English.

The Flapit counter was officially presented to the press at the CES Las Vegas 2015 and received favorable reviews from major specialised press
