= Date and time notation in Catalonia =

Catalonia uses certain conventions for presenting dates and times.

== Date ==
In Catalonia the date order is day, month, year. In most situations, the grammar and syntax rules are applied to this format: <Weekday>, <monthday> de/d' <Month> de/del <year>.

For example: Dimecres, 20 d'abril de 2011 or Dijous, 5 de maig del 2005. Note that months are not capitalized.

Two-digit years are used for short mainly informally where no confusion arises, as in handwriting letters, notes and diaries. Official documents always use full four-digit years.

=== Week ===
The week starts on Monday and ends on Sunday. In short form, days can be written as follows:

- dl for dilluns (Monday)
- dt for dimarts (Tuesday)
- dc for dimecres (Wednesday)
- dj for dijous (Thursday)
- dv for divendres (Friday)
- ds for dissabte (Saturday)
- dg (also dium) for diumenge (Sunday).

=== Months ===
- Gener (January)
- Febrer (February)
- Març (March)
- Abril (April)
- Maig (May)
- Juny (June)
- Juliol (July)
- Agost (August)
- Setembre (September)
- Octubre (October)
- Novembre (November)
- Desembre (December)

== Time ==
In Catalonia there are three spoken word time systems: traditional, modern and a mixture of both. It depends greatly on each Catalan variant.

The traditional uses the quarters as a unit reference based on analog clocks, while the modern one is based on digital clocks.

The two main variants of the 12-hour clock used in spoken Catalan are regarding quarterly fractions and half quarters of the current hour, in a similar way to the quarter's bells of the Big Ben and many others classical tower clocks (except for the four quarters of the full hours). One always relates to the next full hour, in other words, it names the fraction of the currently passing hour. For example, ""tres quarts de tres" ("three-quarters of three", see table below) stands for "three quarters of the third hour have passed". The other variant is relative; this one is also used for multiples of five minutes.

Time	Absolute	Relative
14:00	"les dues en punt / les dues" (two o’clock)	
14:05	“les dues i cinc” (two & five)	
14:07	“mig quart i de tres” (half quarter of three)	
14:10	“1 quart de tres menys 5” (1-quarter minus five)	“les dues i 10” (ten past two)
14:15	“un quart de tres” (one quarter of three)	
14:20	“1 quart de tres i cinc” (1-quarter & five)	
14:22	“un quart i mig de tres” (one quarter & half of three)	
14:25	“1 quart de tres i deu” (1-quarter & ten)	“2 quarts menys 5” (2-quarters minus five)
14:30	“dos quarts de tres” (2-quarters of three)	
14:35	“2 quarts de tres i cinc” (2-quarters & five)	
14:37	“dos quarts i mig de tres” (two quarters & half of three)	
14:40	“2 quarts de 3 i deu” (two-quarters of three & ten)	"3 quarts menys 5” (3-quarters minus five)
14:45	"tres quarts de tres" (three-quarters of three)	
14:50	“3 quarts de 3 i cinc” (three-quarters of three & five)	
14:52	“tres quarts i mig de tres” (three quarters & half of three)	
14:55	“3 quarts de 3 i deu” (three-quarters of three & ten)	"les tres menys 5” (three minus five)
15:00	"les tres en punt / les tres" (three o’clock)	

Note that these phrases are exclusive to the 12-hour clock, just as the "(hour) (minutes)" format is exclusive to the 24-hour clock.
