= Twemco =

Hong Kong clock manufacturer

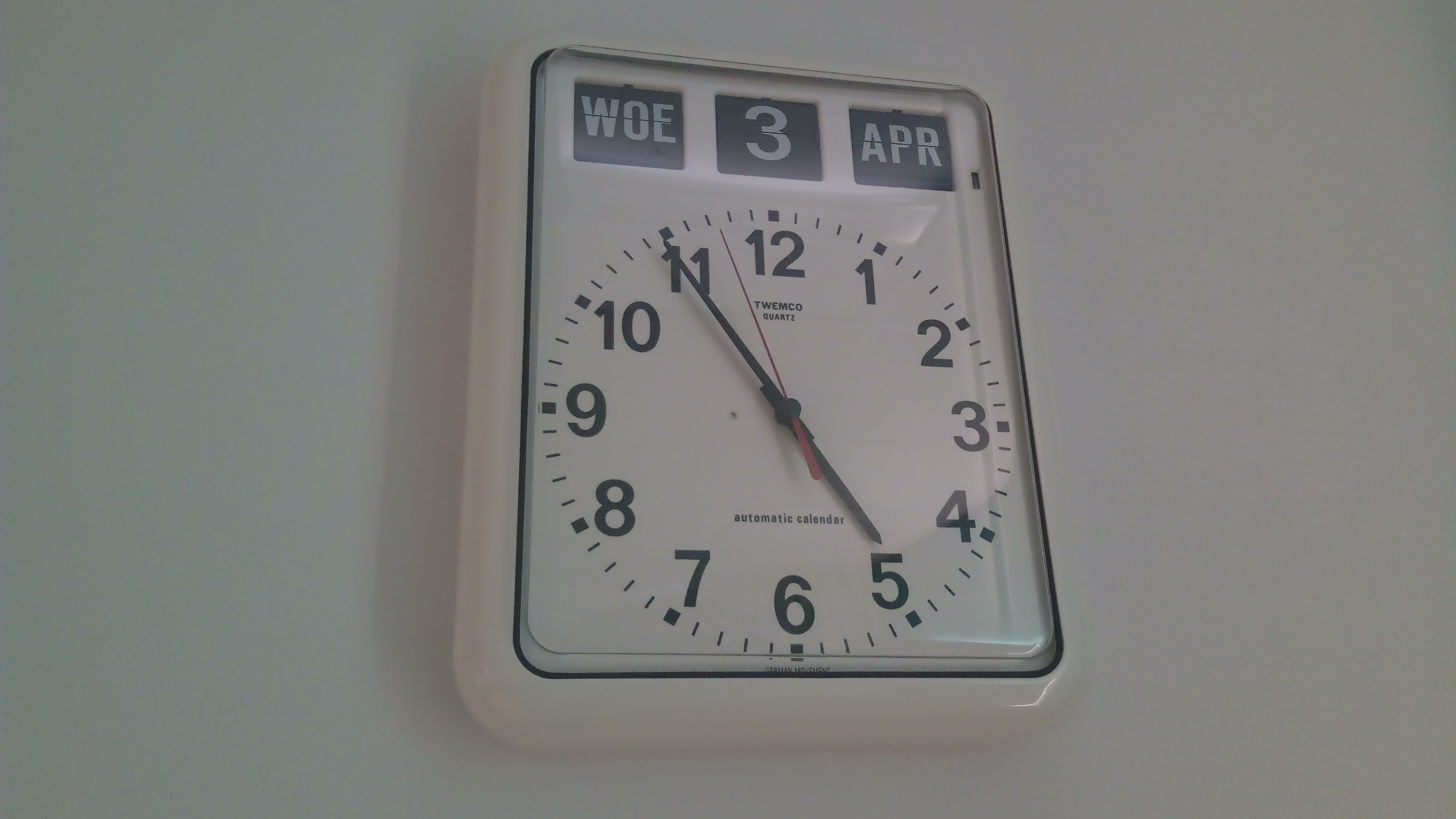
- Twemco quartz automatic calendar clock, Dutch variant
- Formerly: Tai Wah Electrical Manufacturing Co.
- Industry: Clockmaking
- Founded: 1956; 70 years ago
- Founder: Lau Cho Hung
- Headquarters: Kowloon, Hong Kong
- Products: Flip clocks
- Website: twemco.com

Twemco is a manufacturer of flip clocks from Hong Kong. The company emerged in 1956 and became a fully-fledged clockmaker by 1968. The factory shop is located in the Prince Edward area.

Twemco is the world's leading manufacturer of automatic flip clocks and its products became a symbol of Hong Kong precision engineering during the mid-20th century. The company claims to have sold almost 1 million clocks.

The design of Twemco's desk clocks resembles that of the world's first flip clock, the Cifra 3 designed in Italy in 1965.

In Hong Kong, Twemco clocks are a fixture in banks, government buildings and offices. This has led the clocks to become associated with the film aesthetic of Hong Kong director Wong Kar Wai.
