= Flip clock =

Electromechanical, digital timekeeping device

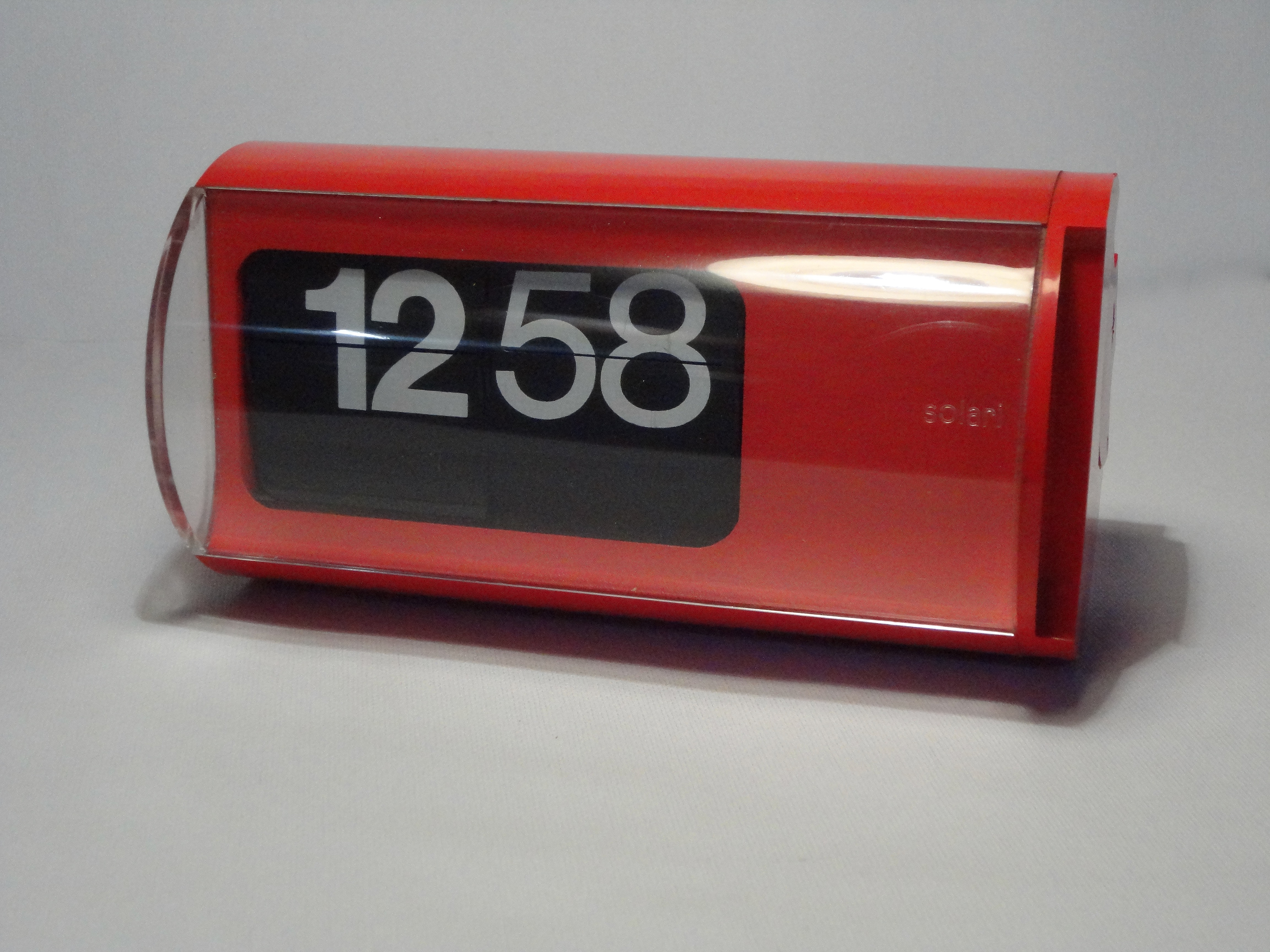
Solari Cifra 3 designed by Nani and Gino Valle with graphic design input form Massimo Vignelli (1965)

A flip clock (also known as a "flap clock") is an electromechanical, digital timekeeping device which displays the time through a split-flap display, where numbers are revealed by flipping or rotating a series of plates or leaves.

== History ==
The flip clock was invented in Germany by Josef Pallweber in 1890. Unlike the typical analog clocks at the time, Pallweber's design used double-sided metal tablets suspended in drums: a minute drum with 60 tablets and an hour drum with 24 tablets. Each tablet displayed the upper half of a number on one side and the lower half of the next number on the reverse, so that when one tablet stood upright and the next hung down, they formed a complete number visible through a reading window. Production of Pallweber's flip clock design began around 1894 at Lenzkirch Clock Factory.

The flip clock saw further development by American inventor Eugene L. Fitch, who patented the Plato clock in 1902. After a varied career including work as a merchant and inventor of typewriter mechanisms, Fitch entered the field of horology with no prior experience. His Plato clock was designed to provide an instant time display using two sets of rotating plates: one for hours and one for minutes, intended not only for timekeeping but also as a method of advertising. Fitch's original design featured vertical disks holding the plates, with each plate marked "ADV" on its back, reflecting his initial vision for clocks as an advertising medium. Subsequent designs were no longer marked in this way.

Fitch continued to develop the Plato clock over the course of four patents. The first in 1902 introduced the basic concept, but the vertical disk arrangement posed aesthetic and functional challenges. His second patent in 1903 shifted the disks to a horizontal position, improving the layout of the clock and allowing for larger numbers by making use of both sides of the plates. This change would introduce new mechanical issues, however, such as the plates failing to stack properly. Fitch addressed this problem in his third patent, also in 1903, by tilting the drive shaft and adding a ball bearing to reduce friction. At this point in development, the increased complexity of the clock had made production unviable, with three sets of plates containing over 900 parts. Fitch's fourth patent in 1904 refined the design using lightweight celluloid plates with die-cut "ears" as pivots, thereby eliminating the need for ball bearings, and introducing cams to prevent premature hour flips. This final design became the prototype for production models.

Production of the Plato clock began between 1904 and 1906, financed by Conrad Hubert, president of the American Everready Company. The clock was a commercial success, with approximately 40,000 units sold. The name "Plato" derived from "plate-o," referencing the plate mechanism, though the name was often associated with the philosopher Plato. Early models were manufactured by the Ansonia Clock Company, with variations including glass domes and alternative winding mechanisms. A license was granted to a French firm which produced 30-hour and 8-day models of the Plato clock, while German copies by firms like Lenzkircher Uhren Fabrik and Gebr. Junghans soon followed.

Development of the flip clock continued beyond Fitch's work. Early designs relied on mechanical movements, and material limitations posed durability issues, with the plates often becoming warped beyond repair. By the mid-20th century, electromechanical flip clocks were developed. A significant improvement to the design came from Josef Mergenhagen in Germany during the 1950s. Initially using a 30-hour non-jewel movement, Mergenhagen upgraded it to an 8-day, 7-jewel mechanism and modernized the case design. After early plastic plates faced similar warping issues to previous clocks, he sourced a superior plastic from a German manufacturer, which resolved the issue of warping and allowed the plates to remain flat under various conditions. His models, marked "J. Mergenhagen West Germany," included both vertical and horizontal versions.

== Method of operation ==
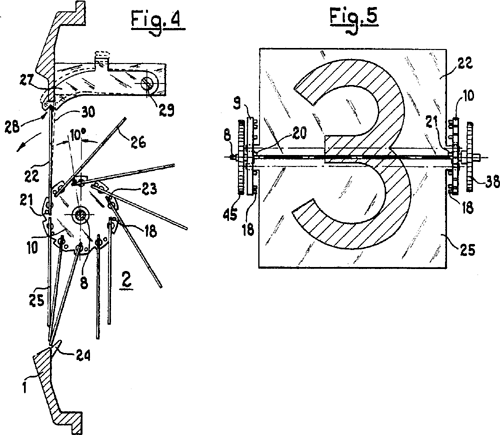
Schematic of a split-flap display in a digital clock display

An electric motor (often synchronous, if directly connected to the AC line) turns two sets of wheels continuously via a reduction gear train: the faster at a rate of 1 revolution per hour, the slower at a rate of 1 revolution per 24 hours. The wheels move continuously, not in steps.

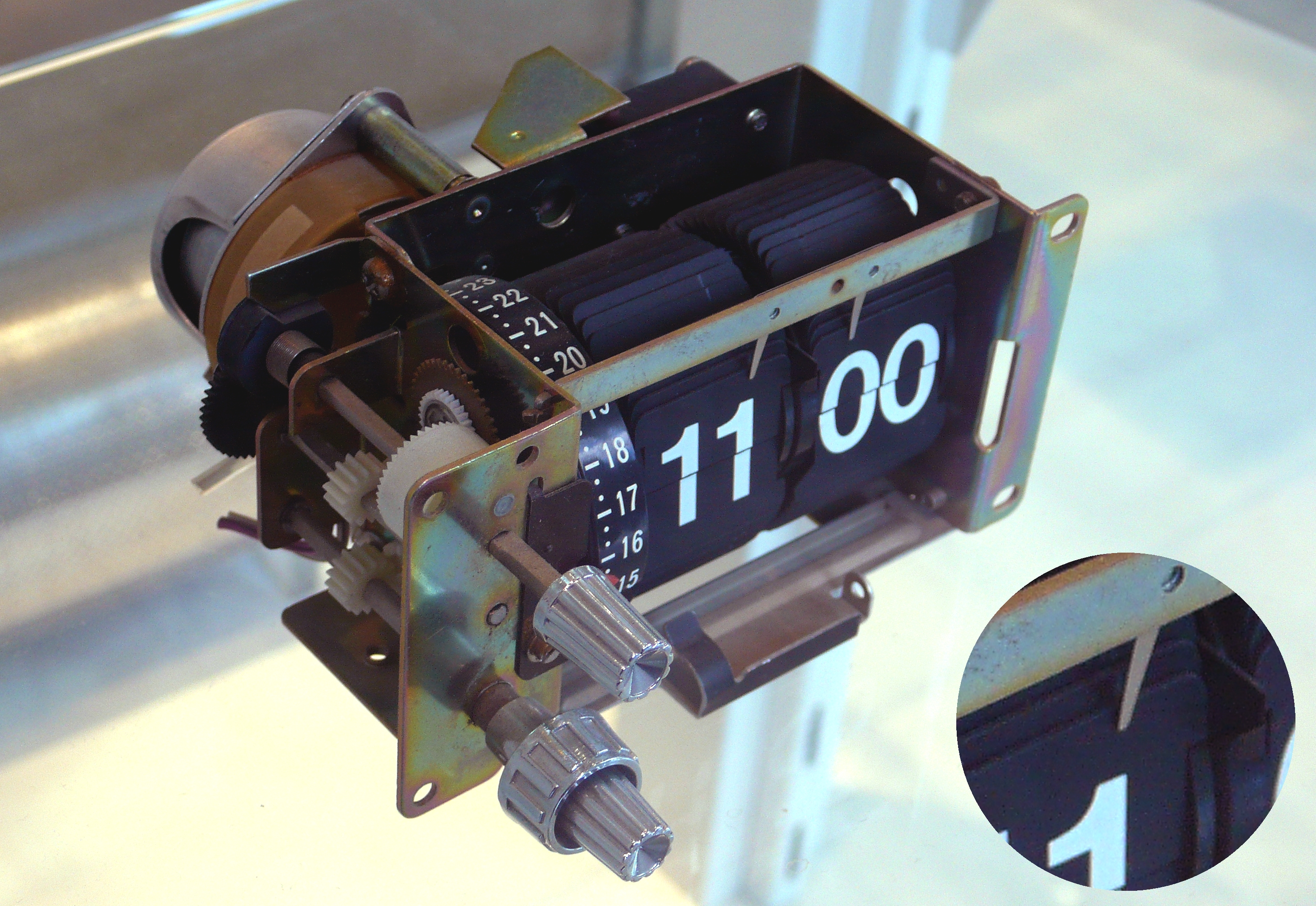
Mechanism of a split-flap alarm clock, removed from its case. The inset shows the metal tab holding back the top flap. The narrow numbered wheel and knobs on the left are the alarm mechanism. This is a synchronous electric clock which is kept to the correct time by the 50/60 Hz AC power grid. The small hook which retains the hour leaves until the top of the hour can be dimly seen, retracted, in the inset.

The faster wheel has connected to it a ring of 60 flat plastic leaves. On the leaves are printed numerals so that, when a person holds two adjacent leaves apart like an open book, the two open leaves spell out a numeral, and flipping a leaf down increases the number shown by 1 unit. The "book" is opened vertically, and its pages form a ring. This ring is put into position and rotated so that one page falls each minute, showing a new number for the minutes.

The slower wheel has connected to it a similar ring of leaves, only there are 48 leaves on this ring. These leaves have hour numbers printed on them. There are two of each hour, like this: 12_{am}, 12_{am}, 1_{am}, 1_{am}, 2_{am}, 2_{am}, ... 11_{pm}, 11_{pm} in a 12-hour clock, and 0, 0, 1, 1, 2, 2, ... 23, 23 in a 24-hour clock. Having two sets of leaves for each hour also allows the clock to alternate between 12- and 24-hour display, every half hour, like this: 12_{am}, 0_{h}, 1_{am}, 1_{h}, 2_{am}, 2_{h}, ... 11_{pm}, 23_{h}. One leaf falls each half-hour, at approximately 25 and 55 minutes after the hour. A different design features 60 leaves with the numbers 1 to 12 repeated in fives, each leaf falling after 12 minutes. The disadvantage of this is that 24-hour clocks cannot use this design, nor there is a way to show "AM" or "PM" information in a 12-hour design.

Minute leaves 45 through 59 have a small tooth on their left edges, pointing toward the hour leaves. The purpose of this tooth is as follows: at 45 minutes after the hour, the tooth pushes a small hook that protrudes into the hour wheel area. This hook will catch any falling hour leaf (as mentioned above, it falls from its metal tab a few minutes before the hour) until it is released by the minute leaf's fall at the top of the hour.

== Daylight saving time ==
Many vintage digital clocks with split flap displays cannot be wound back, as the flip mechanism operates only in one direction. Instead they must be either wound forward 23 hours to achieve the effect of winding back 1 hour at the end of daylight saving time or the clock may be stopped (by disconnecting it from power) for 1 hour. However, on some newer clocks, forward and backward time setting is possible. GE clocks sometimes had this feature.

== Gallery ==
An animation of how a split-flap display works

Split-flap display mechanism animation

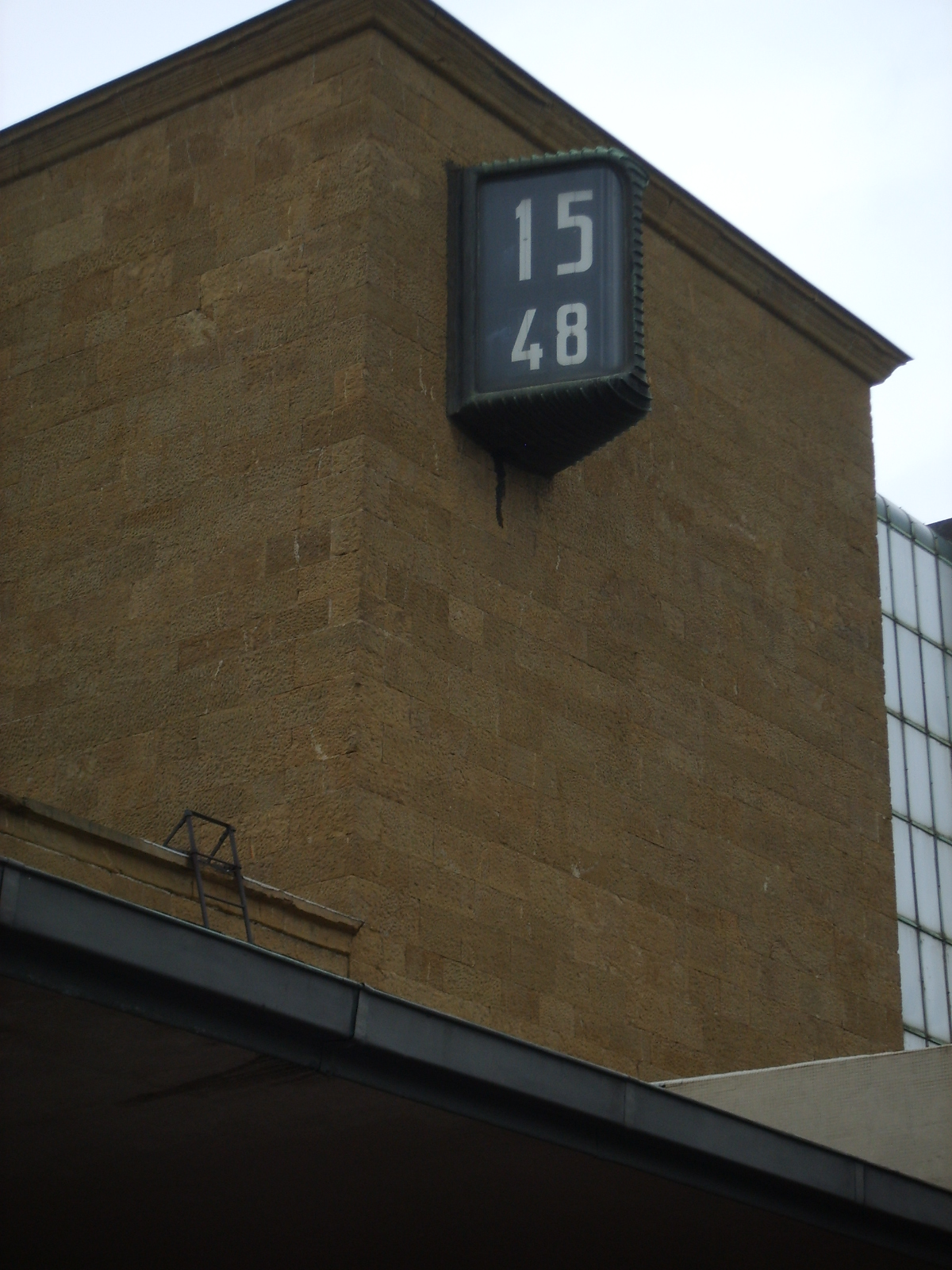
Firenze Santa Maria Novella railway station, first digital flip clock in Italy, dated 1934.

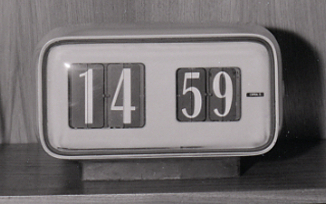
Solari Cifra 5 clock by Nani and Gino Valle (1957)

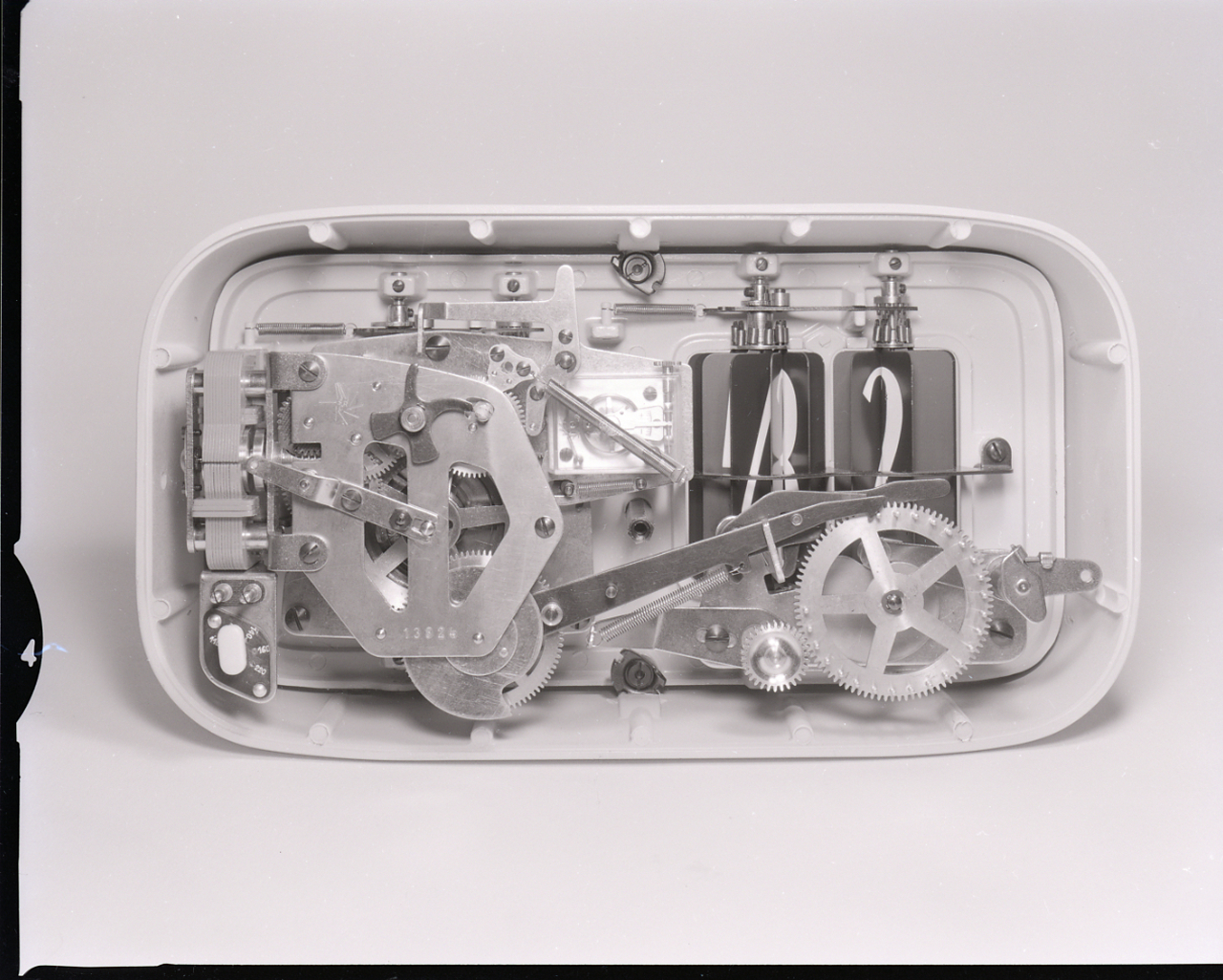
Cifra 5 internal mechanism

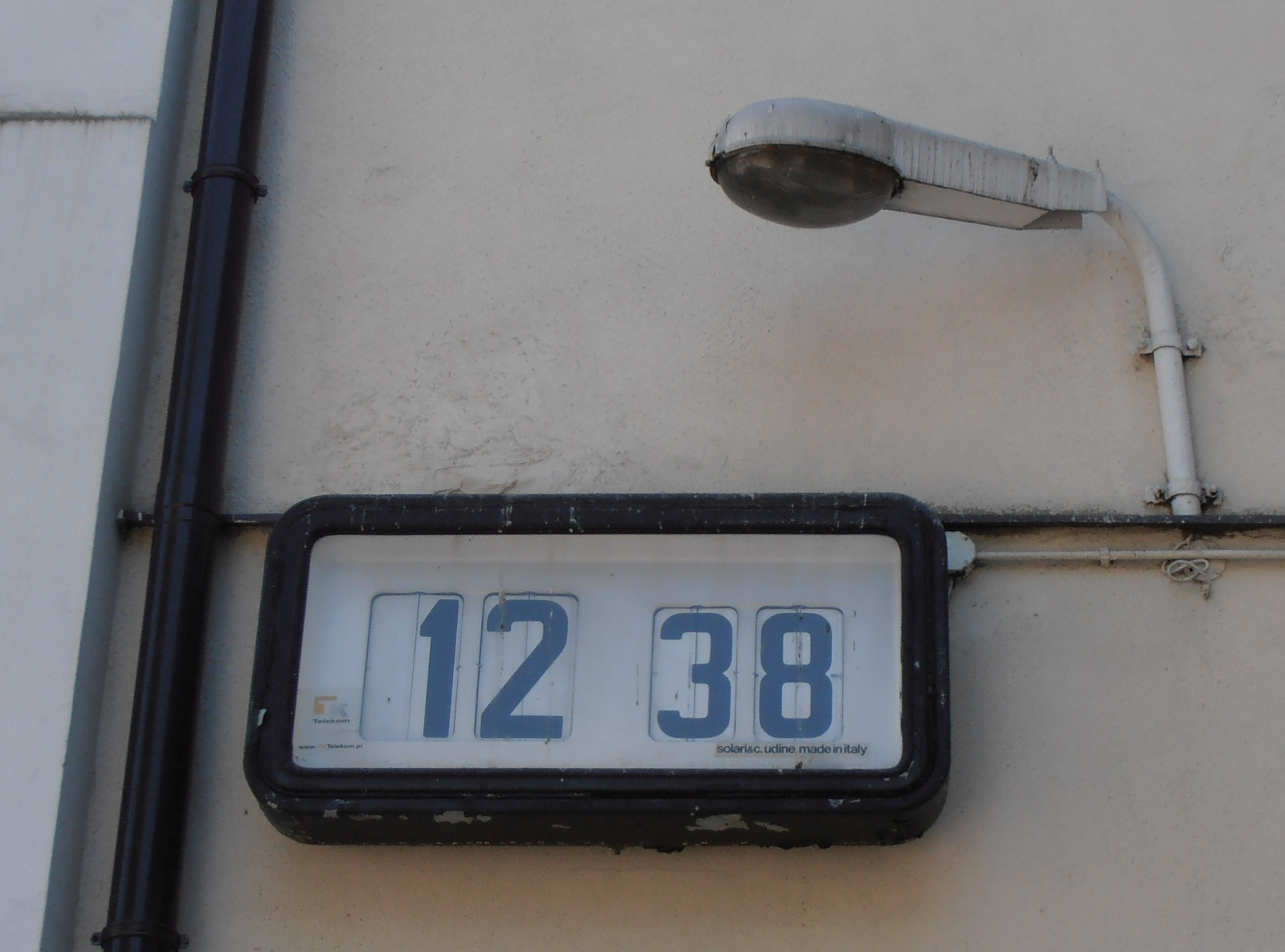
Cifra 23 by Solari di Udine, known for its stylish design, digital flip clock dated Sixties, used in airport Paris-Orly and Warszawa Centralna railway station.

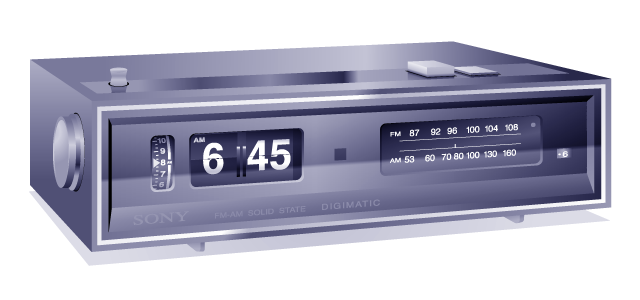
A 1969 radio alarm clock (Sony Digimatic 8FC-59W) with an early digital display

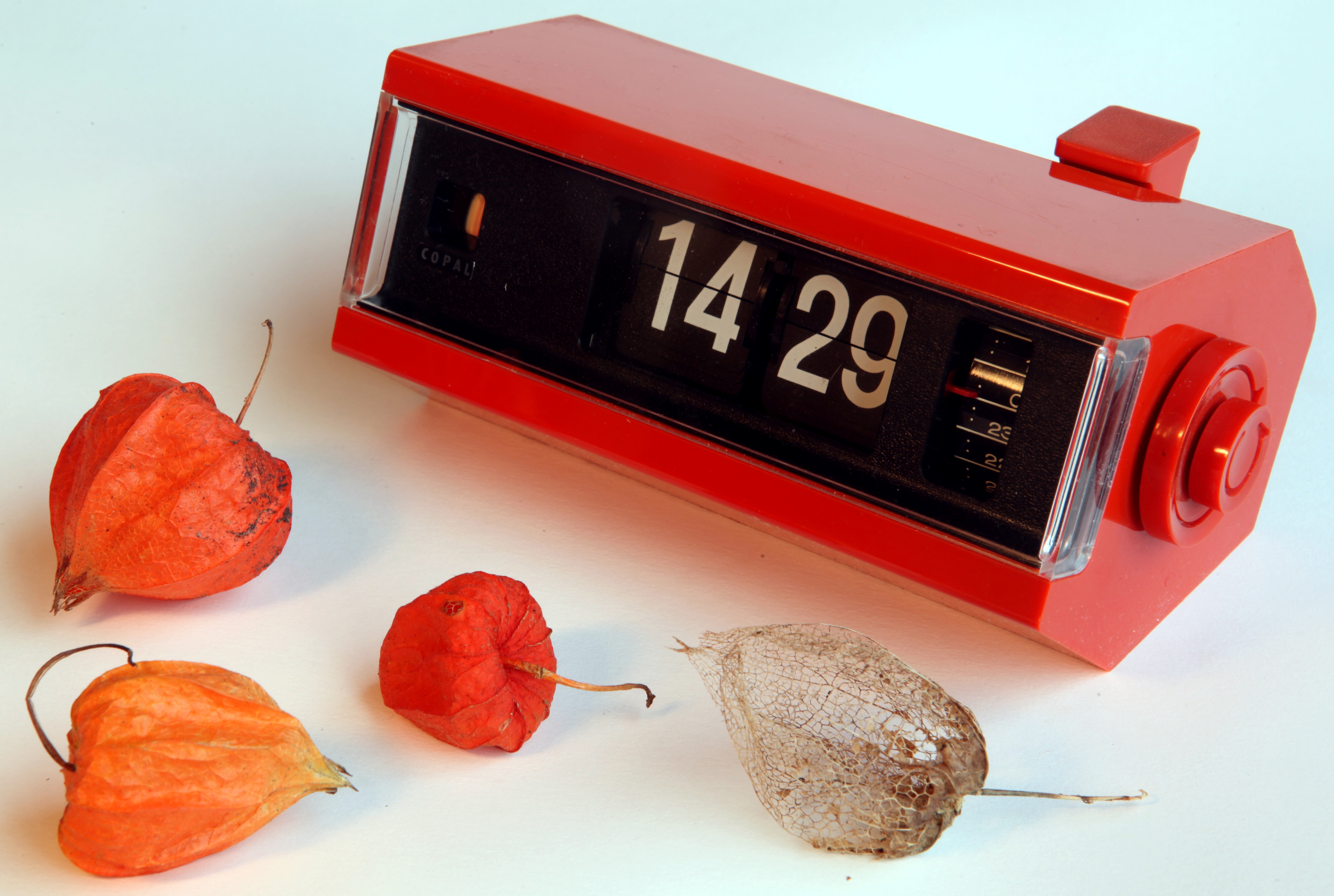
1970s Copal flip alarm clock

== See also ==
- Cifra 3
- Twemco
- Digital sundial
