= Solari di Udine =

Italian company that manufactures displays

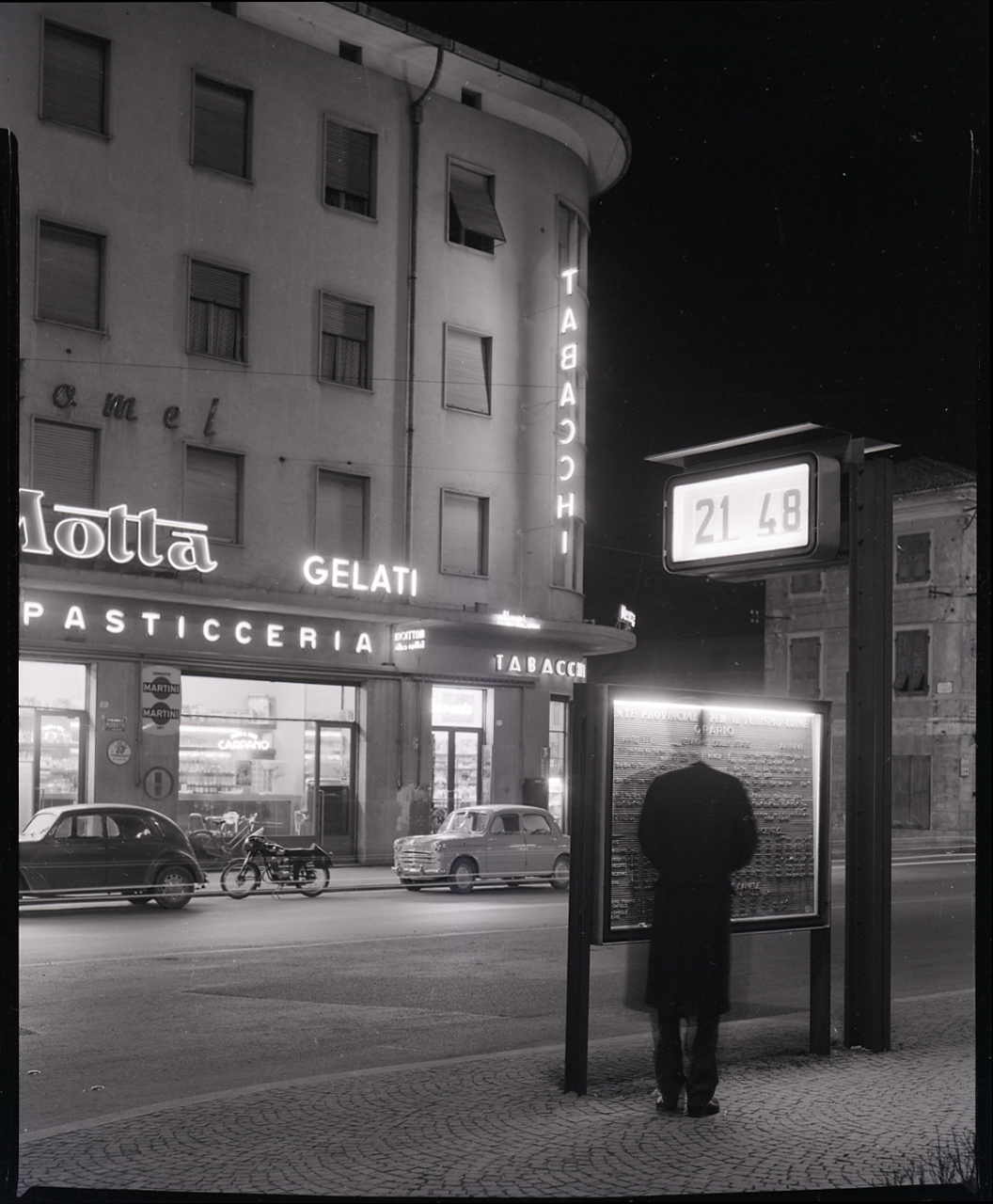
Cifra 23 by Solari di Udine, known for its stylish design, digital flip clock dated Sixties, used in airport Paris-Orly and Warszawa Centralna railway station.

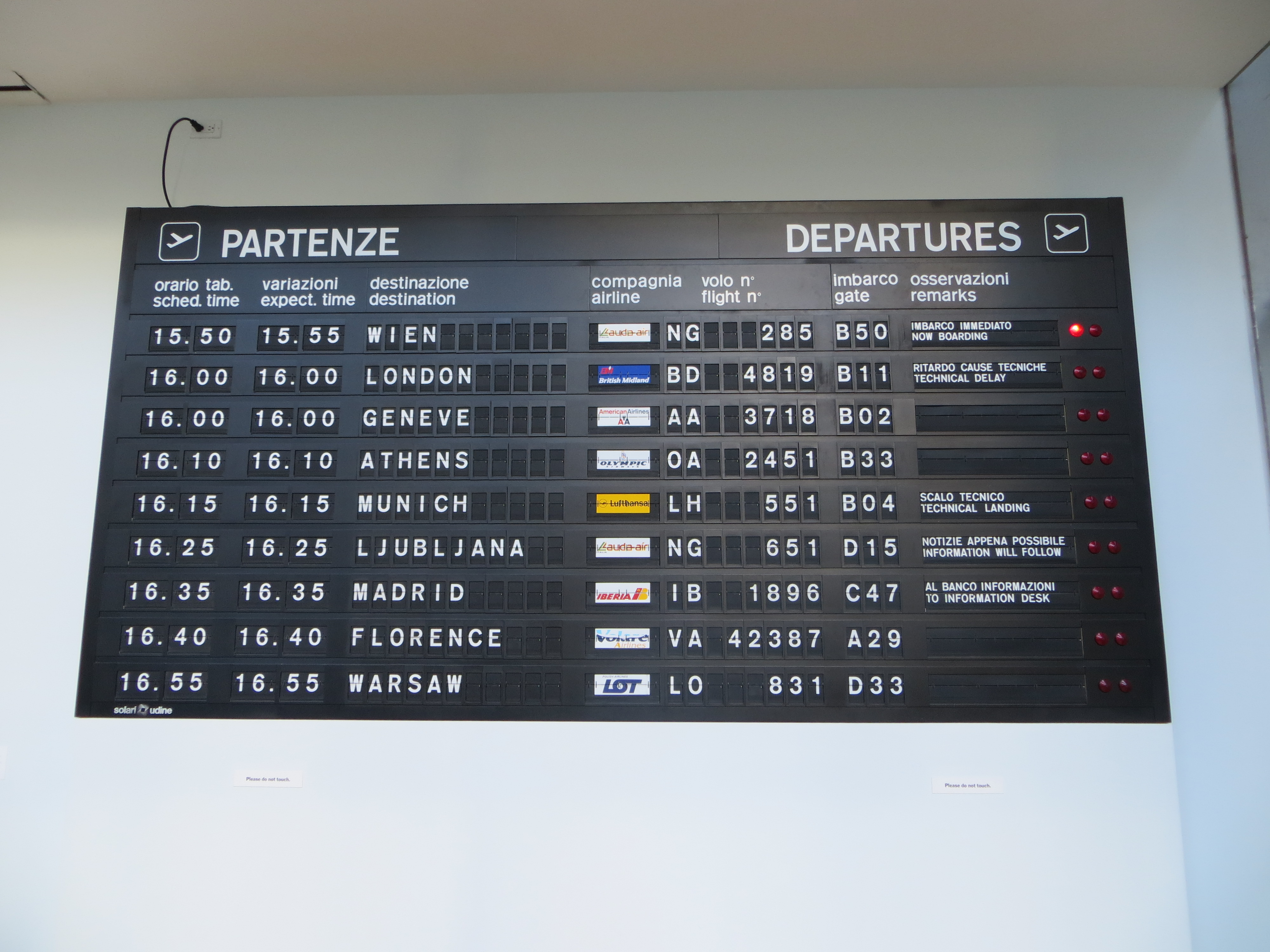
Display at the Museum of Modern Art

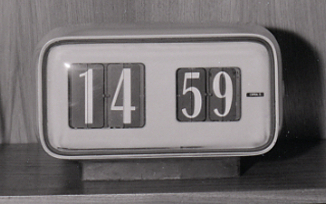
Cifra 5 digital flip clock designed by Gino Valle (1954)

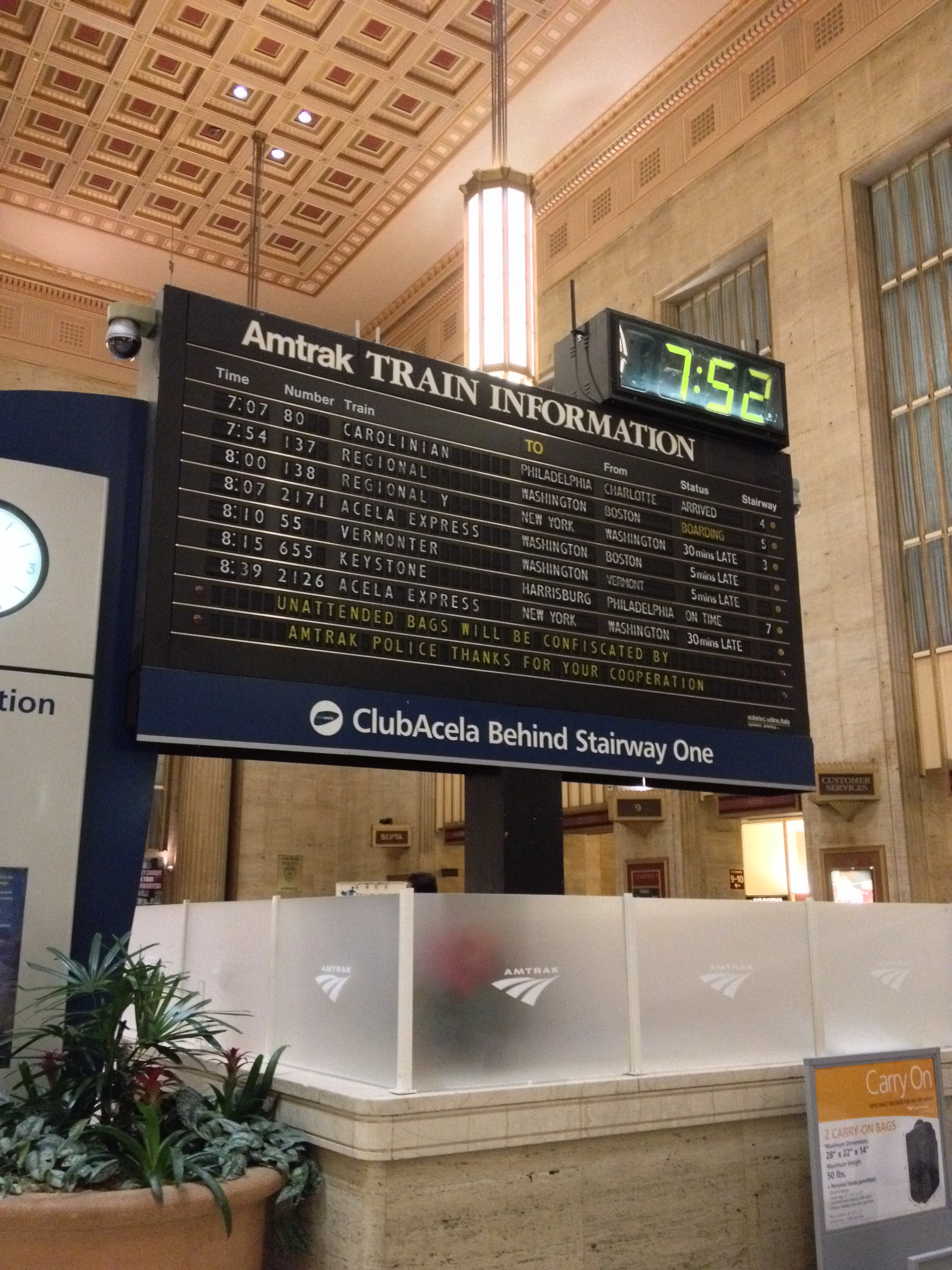
Split-flap display at 30th Street Station in 2013, since moved to the Railroad Museum of Pennsylvania

Solari S.p.A - Premiata Fabbrica Orologi Fondata Nel 1725 - Pesariis (Udine), also known as Solari S.p.A. or as Solari di Udine is an Italian company that designs and manufactures public information displays, historically split-flap displays.

== History ==
The company was founded in 1725 in Udine, a small city in northeastern Italy. Initially, the company specialized in clocks for towers. It began working with designer Gino Valle after World War II, and developed signs with four flaps, each with ten digits, to display the time. The company eventually designed displays with 40 flaps, with the help of Belgian inventor John Myer. The new displays could include numbers and letters, allowing for a much wider use.

The company's Cifra 5 clock was awarded the Compasso d'Oro in 1956. The same year, Solari sold its first moving sign to Liege railway station in Belgium. It subsequently sold thousands to airports and train stations. There is no known record of surviving Solari split-flap displays, though hundreds have been replaced with more modern displays across the world.

In December 2025, Solari SpA celebrated, after its relaunch in the 1990s, its 300th anniversary, as the company was founded in 1725 in Pesariis, in the Val Pesarina, one of the eight valleys of Carnia. To mark the anniversary, the Italian Postal service issued a commemorative stamp featuring Solari's Cifra 3 clock.

== Specific displays ==
- For its conversion into the TWA Hotel which opened in 2019, the full restoration of the TWA Flight Center at John F. Kennedy International Airport included its classic Solari split-flap message board with authentic original mechanical operation manufactured in Italy in 1962.
- The Solari board at 30th Street Station in Philadelphia, Pennsylvania, operated there from the 1970s to 2018, the last to operate in an Amtrak station. The board was subsequently moved to the Railroad Museum of Pennsylvania.
- Penn Station in New York City operated a Solari board from 1967 to 1985. Its removal upset the public, though subsequent displays mimic some aspects of the Solari board.
- Starbucks Reserve Roasteries feature a Solari split-flap message board for displaying the coffee being roasted
- Keikyu Kawasaki Station in Kawasaki City, Japan operated a Solari board from 1986 to 2022. This board is made with Kyosan Electric Manufacturing Co., Ltd. This board is the final used in Kanto, removed in February 12 After the last train on midnight.

== See also ==
- Cifra 3 – Type of electro-mechanical digital clock
- List of clock types
