= Cifra 3 =

Type of electro-mechanical digital clock

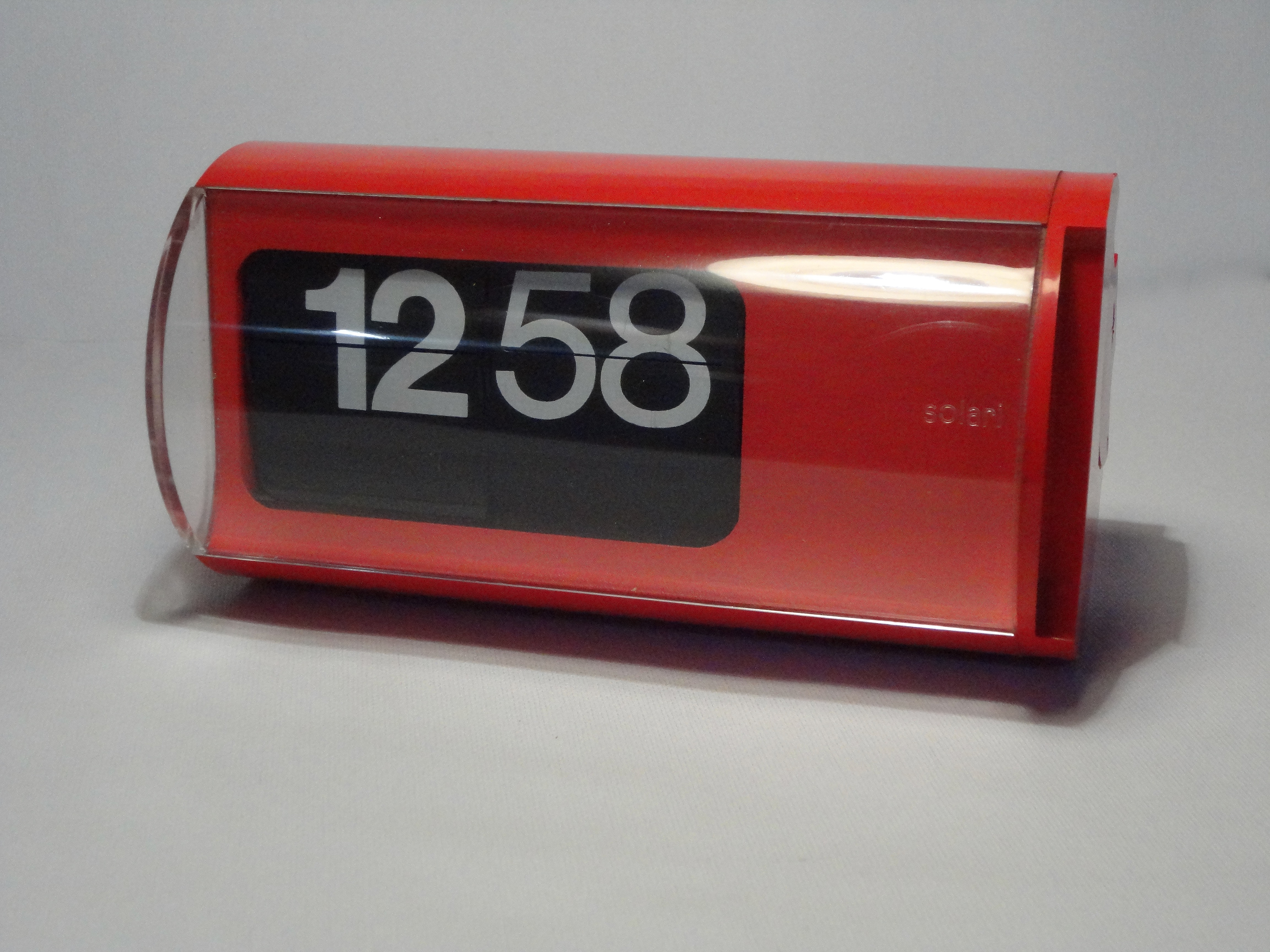
Solari Cifra 3 designed by Gino Valle

The Cifra 3 [ˈtʃiːfra ˈtre] is a digital flip clock manufactured by Solari di Udine, S.p.A., Italy. It was designed by Italian architect Gino Valle (1923–2003) in 1965, with contributions from Belgian inventor John Myer and typography design by Massimo Vignelli.

== History and design ==
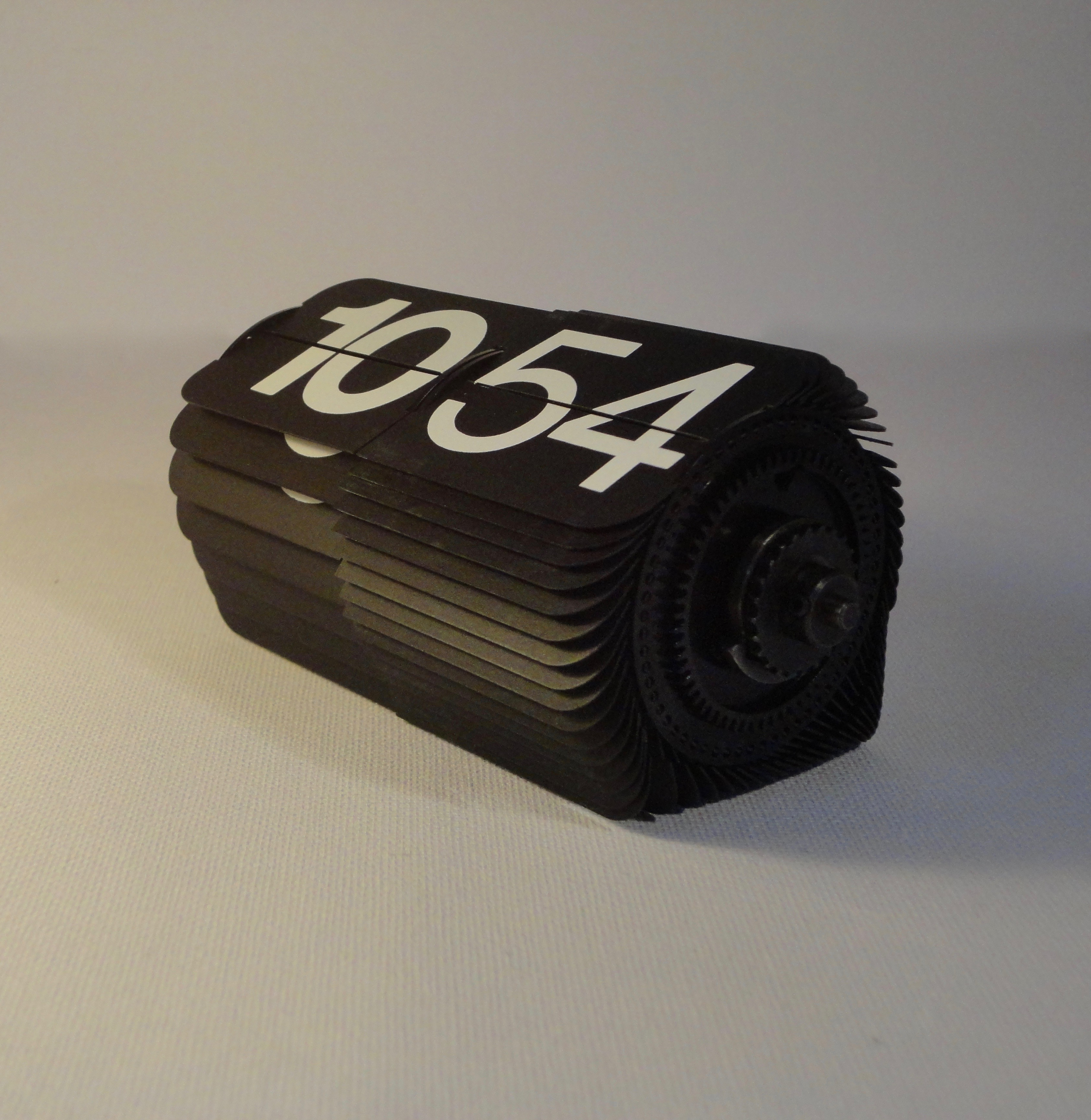
Photo of "split-flap" display mechanism

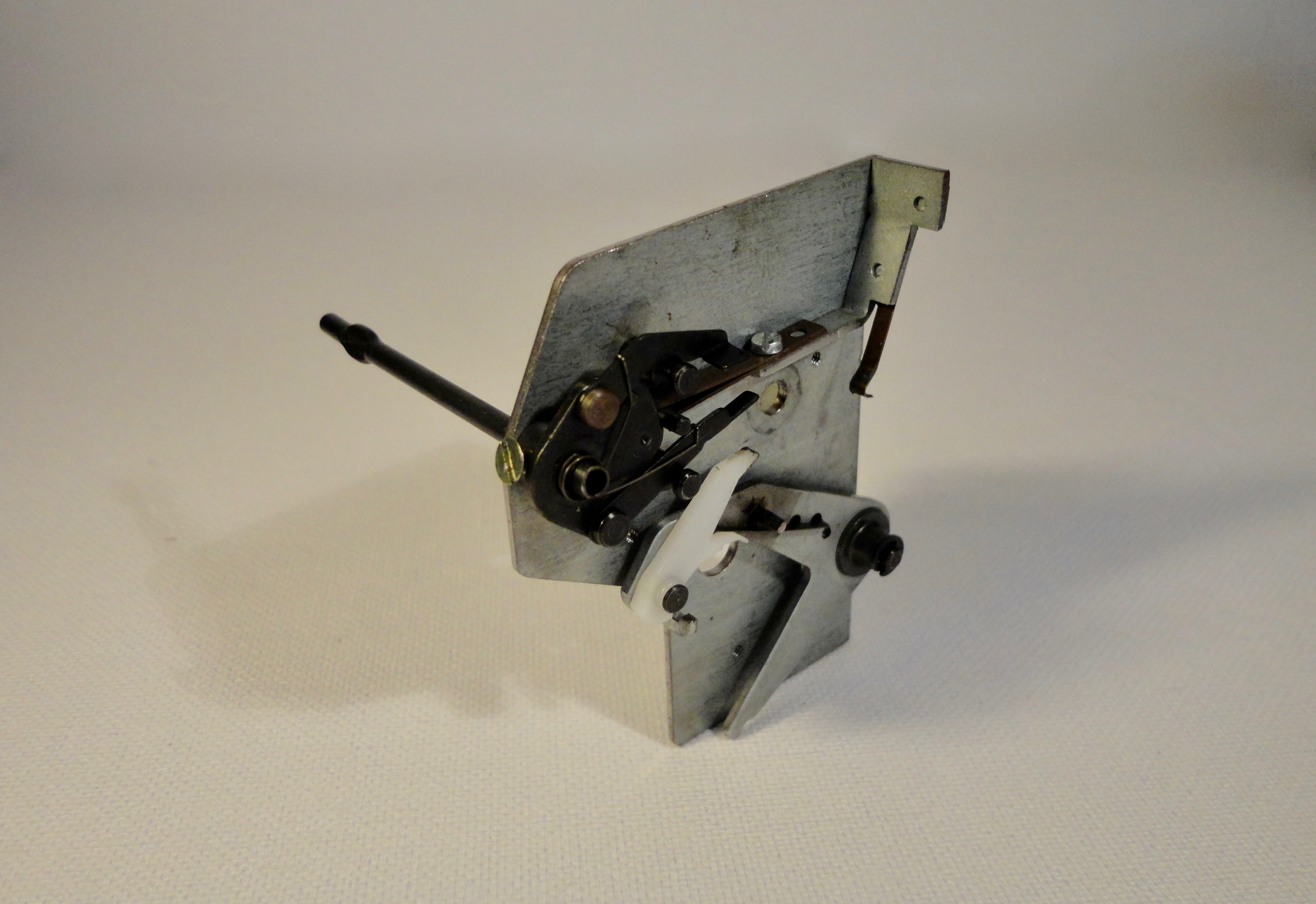
Detail showing part of the internal mechanism

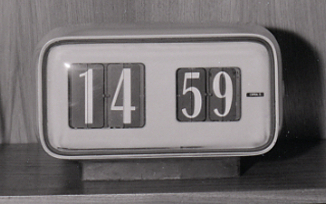
Cifra 5 digital flip clock designed by Gino Valle (1954)

Gino Valle's relationship with the Solari company began in 1954 with the design of the Cifra 5 electromechanical digit-snap clock (patented in 1957), consisting of 4 vertical pallets of 10 numbers each making up all the hours. The Cifra 5 clock was the progenitor of a full-fledged family of industrial-type clocks, awarded the Compasso d'Oro in 1956. With the help of Belgian inventor John Meyer, a roll of 48 pallets was achieved, leading to the creation of the smallest direct-reading clock, the iconic Cifra 3.

The Cifra 3 is widely considered a masterpiece of industrial design, using a split-flap display to display hours and minutes. The Cifra 3 was included in the 2004 "Humble Masterpieces" exhibition at the Museum of Modern Art in New York, and is in the museum's permanent collection. Many other museums include the clock in their collections, including the Metropolitan Museum of Art in New York, the Science Museum in London and the Israel Museum in Jerusalem.

In December 2025, Solari SpA celebrated its 300th anniversary. To mark the occasion, the Italian Postal service issued a commemorative stamp featuring the company's Cifra 3 clock.

== See also ==
- List of clock types
- Split-flap display
