= Split-flap display =

Electromechanical display device

The Signaltron main departure board at Praha-Smíchov station, Czech Republic (2012), manufactured by Pragotron

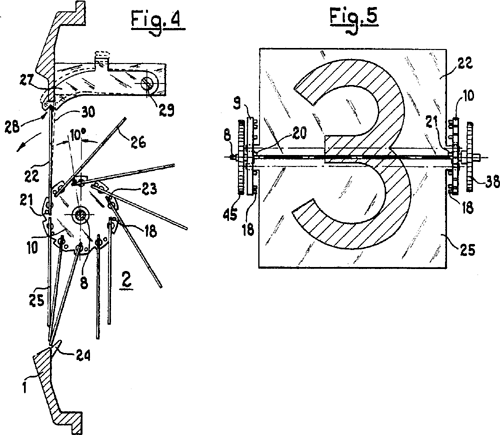
Schematic of a split-flap display in a digital clock display

An animation of how a split-flap display works

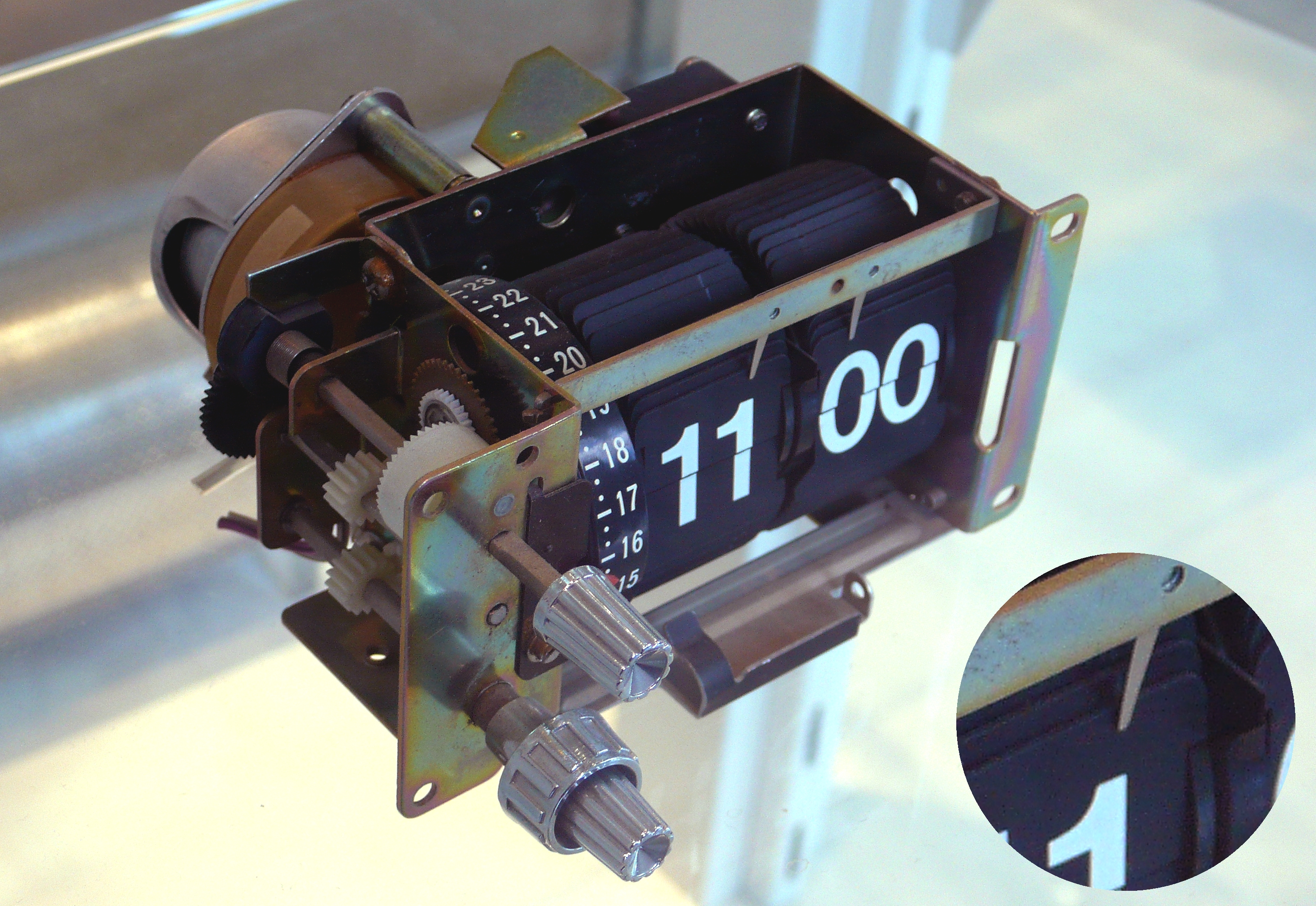
Enlarged inner workings of a split-flap clock

A split-flap display, or a flap display, is a digital electromechanical display device that presents changeable alphanumeric text, and occasionally fixed graphics. They were (from the 1960s to 1990s) commonly used as public transport timetables in airports and railway stations.

They were often called Solari boards after the Italian display manufacturer Solari di Udine, or, in Central European countries, Pragotron after the Czech manufacturer.

Split-flap displays were once commonly used in consumer digital clocks known as flip clocks.

== Design ==
Each character position or graphic position has a collection of flaps on which characters or graphics are painted or silkscreened. Larger flaps can display whole words, while smaller flaps display individual characters.

The flaps are precisely flipped to display the desired character or graphic. These devices typically show departure or arrival information in railway stations and airports, where they serve as flight information display systems.

Advantages of these displays include:

- high visibility and wide viewing angle in most lighting conditions,
- little or no power consumption when the display remains static, and
- distinct metallic flapping sound draws attention when the information is updated.

== Alternatives ==
Flip-dot displays and LED display boards are alternatives to split-flap displays. Their contents can be changed digitally instead of replacing flaps but at the cost of lower readability. They also can change more quickly, as a split-flap display may cycle through many flaps.

The Massachusetts Bay Transportation Authority replaced its aging Solari boards at North Station and South Station, using a generated flapping noise to cue passengers to train boarding updates.

== Applications ==
Many game shows of the 1970s used this type of display for contestant podium scoreboards. Usually, the flip was left-to-right on a vertical axis. The game board on the Nickelodeon game show Make the Grade was a 7x7 split-flap display, used to display subjects and wild cards, as well as tracking contestants' progress. The television game show Chain Reaction on Game Show Network features computer-simulated split-flap displays to display the various words in a chain.

In Italy, split-flap displays have also been occasionally used as destination signs for transit vehicles; there was also a brief vogue for them in the United Kingdom in the mid 1980s.

== Non-informational uses ==
The aesthetic appeal of the displays is such that they have also seen use in purely artistic forms, such as in Pedestrian Drama, contemporary artwork using this display technology, and art by Juan Fontanive, who has used the mechanism extensively since 2005.

The album cover for The Enemy's album We'll Live and Die in These Towns is based on the Solari design seen at British railway stations.

== Gallery ==
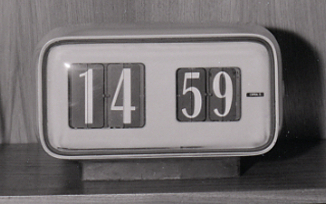
Solari Cifra 5 clock by Nani and Gino Valle (1957)

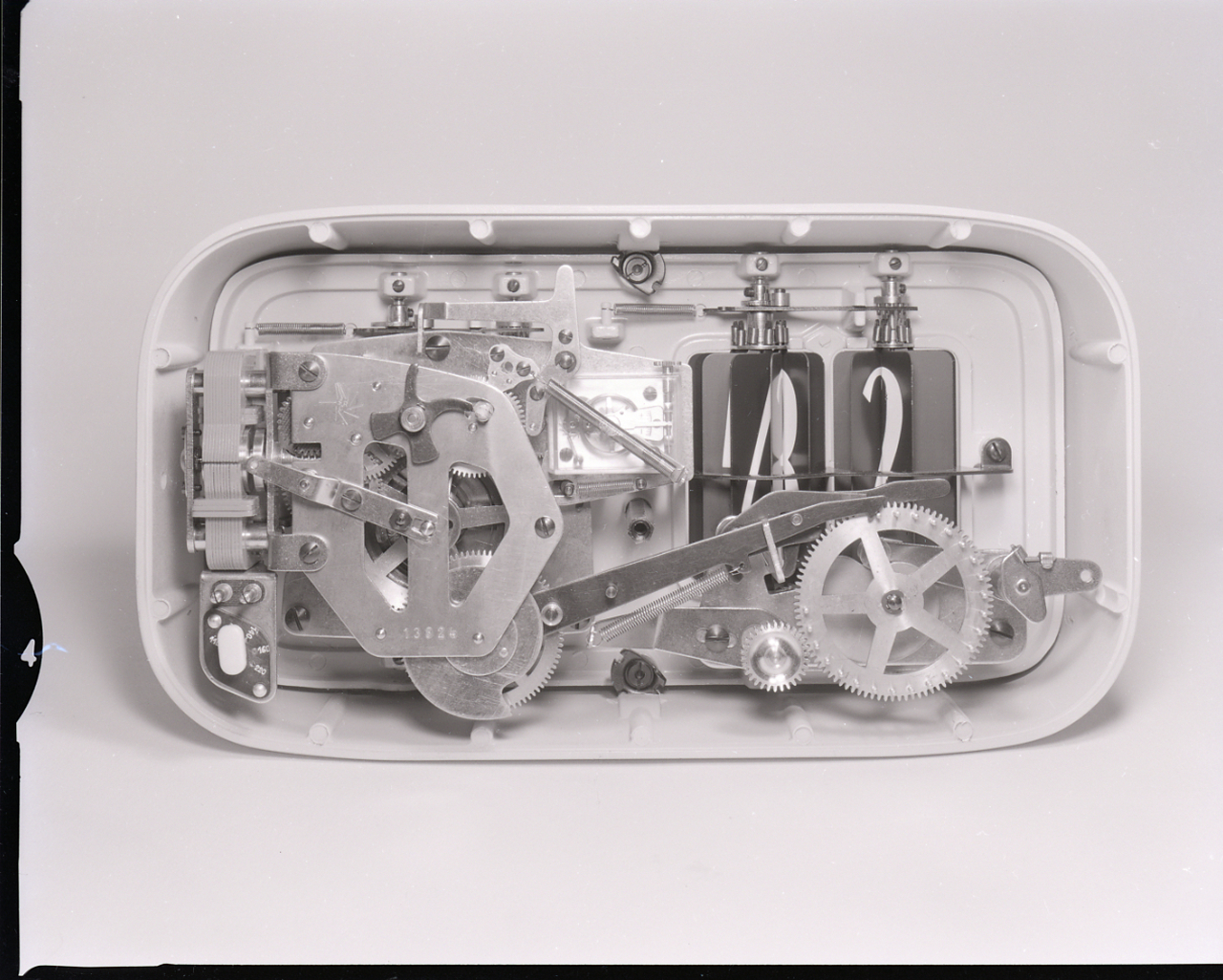
Cifra 5 internal mechanism

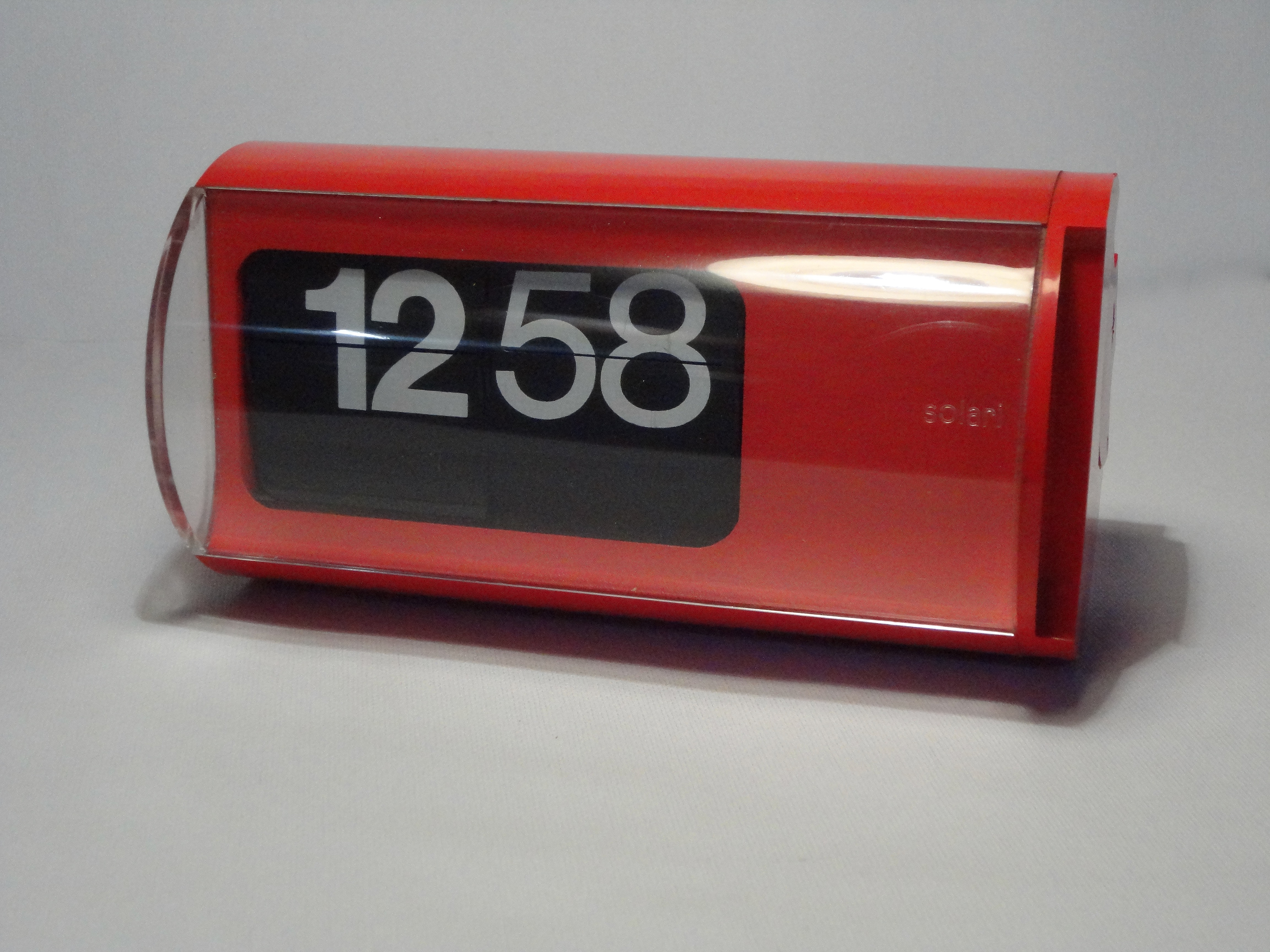
Solari Cifra 3 designed by Nani and Gino Valle with graphic design input form Massimo Vignelli (1965)

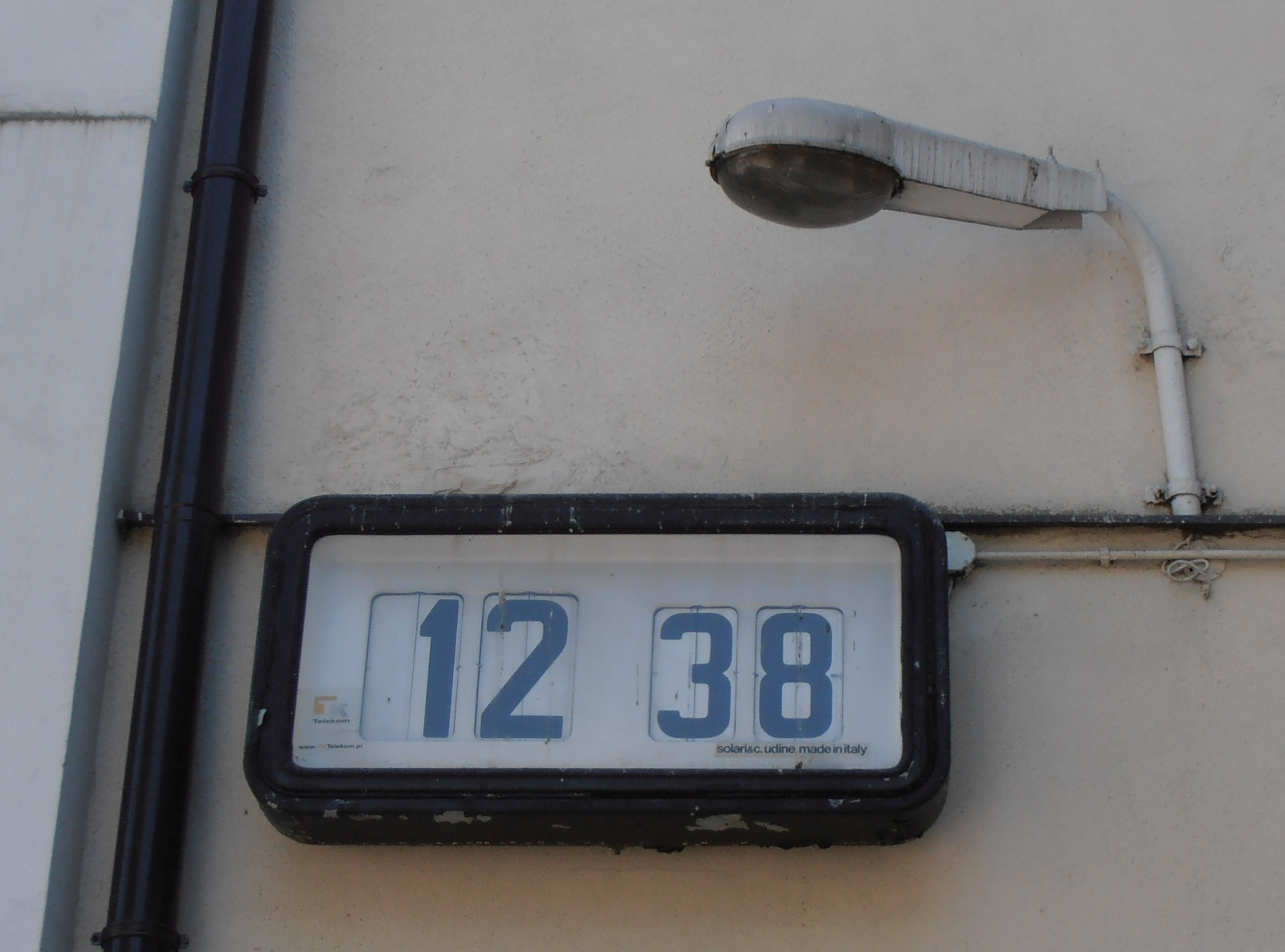
Solari Cifra 23 clock

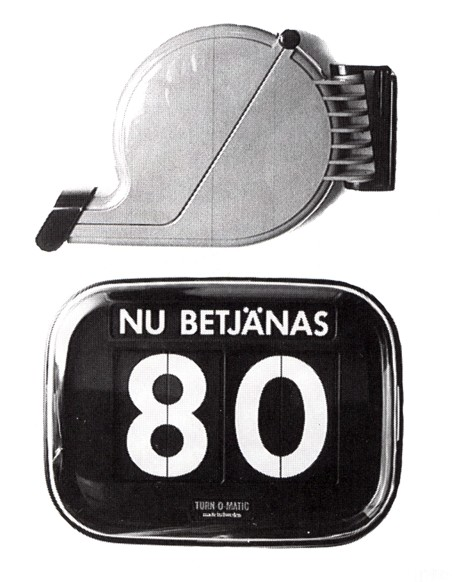
Turn-O-Matic M80 Könummersystem by A&E Design (1974)

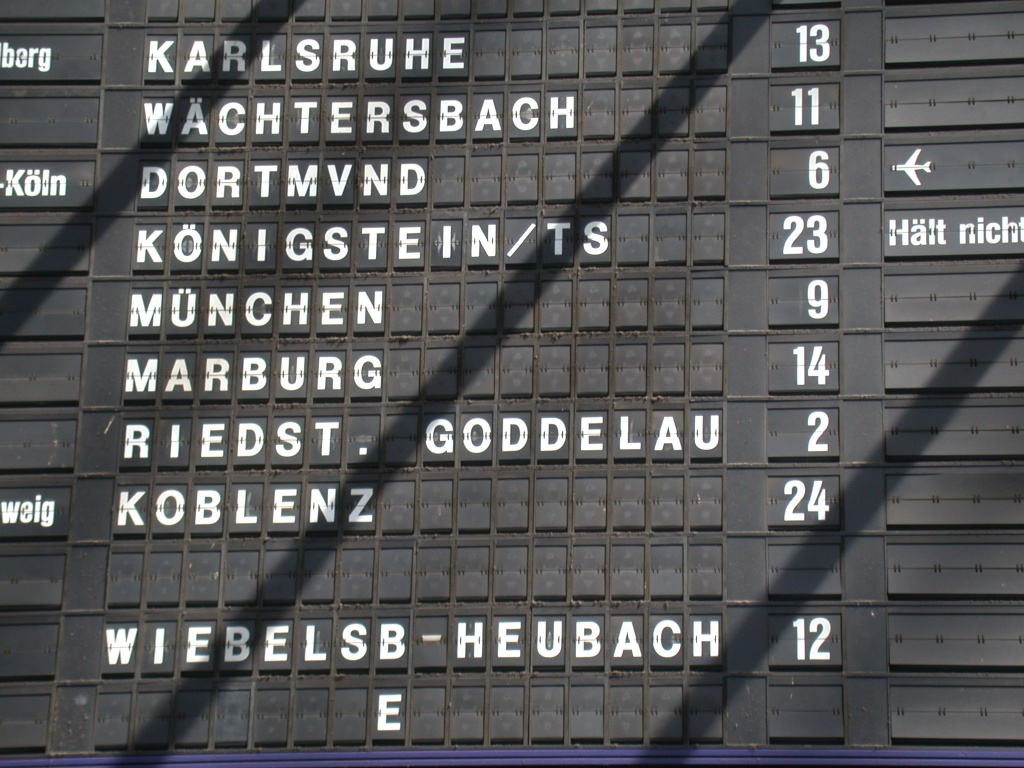
Section of a split-flap display board at Frankfurt (Main) Hauptbahnhof (2005)

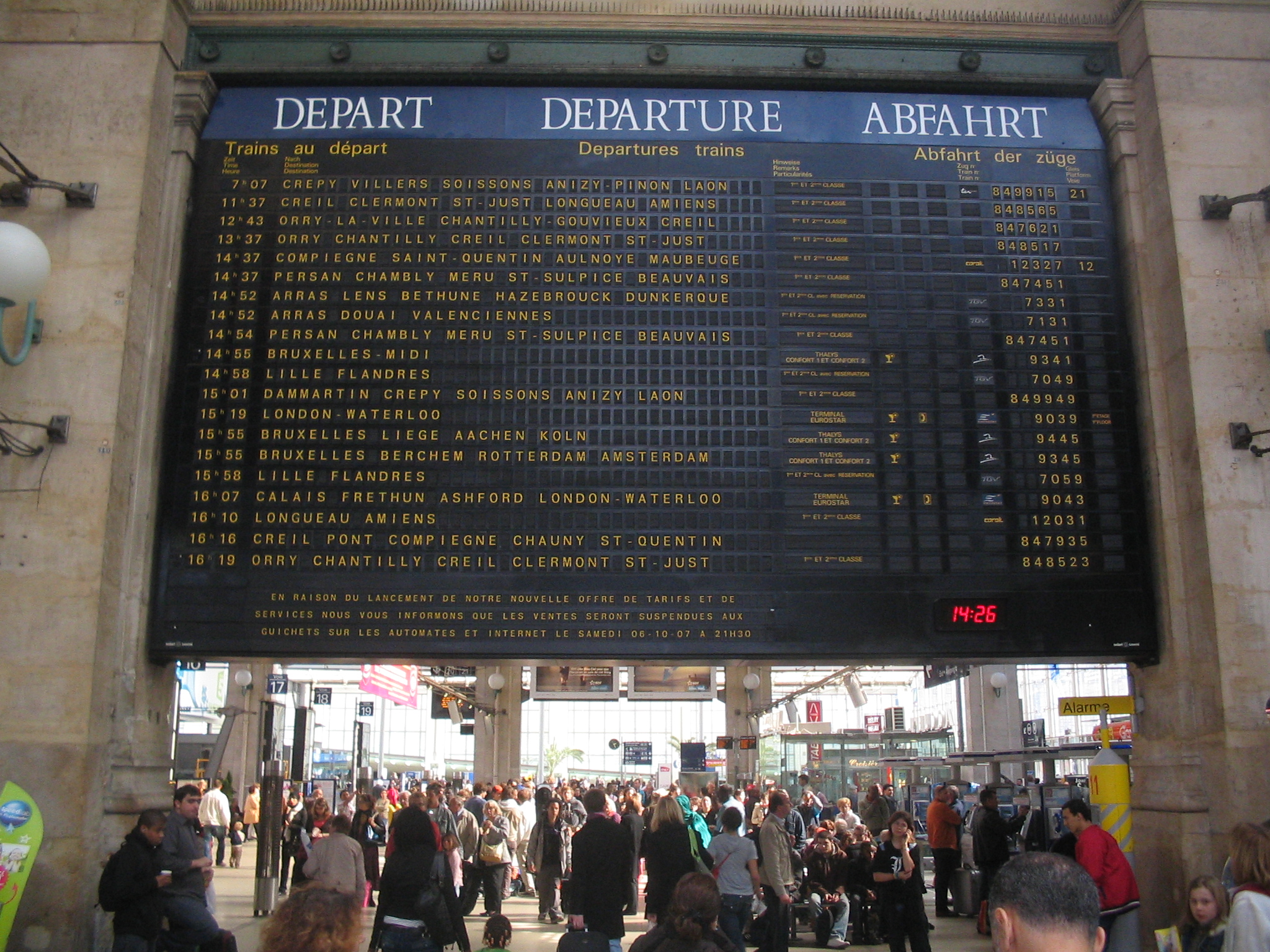
Flap departure board at Gare du Nord, Paris (2007)

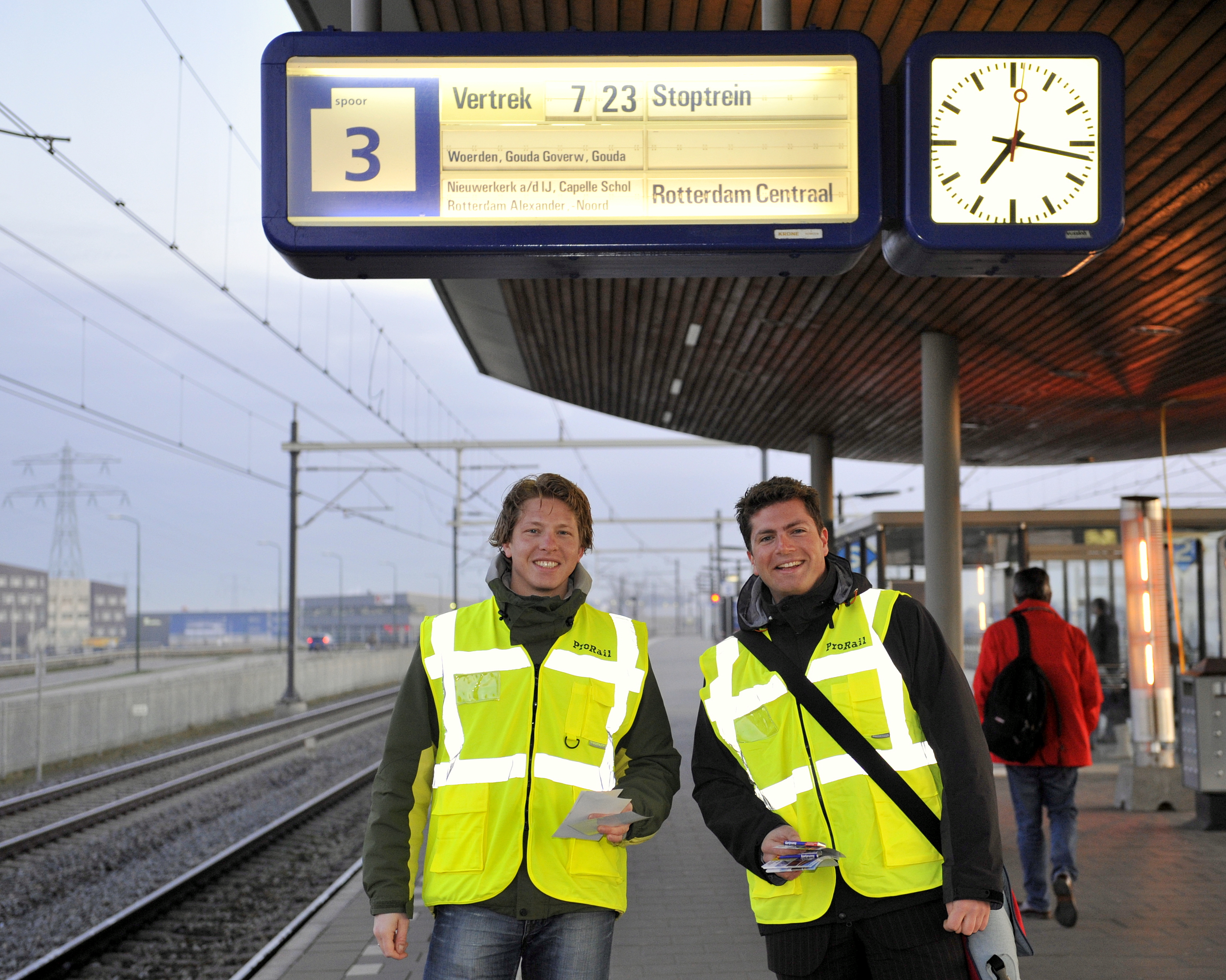
Flap display at Breukelen railway station, Holland

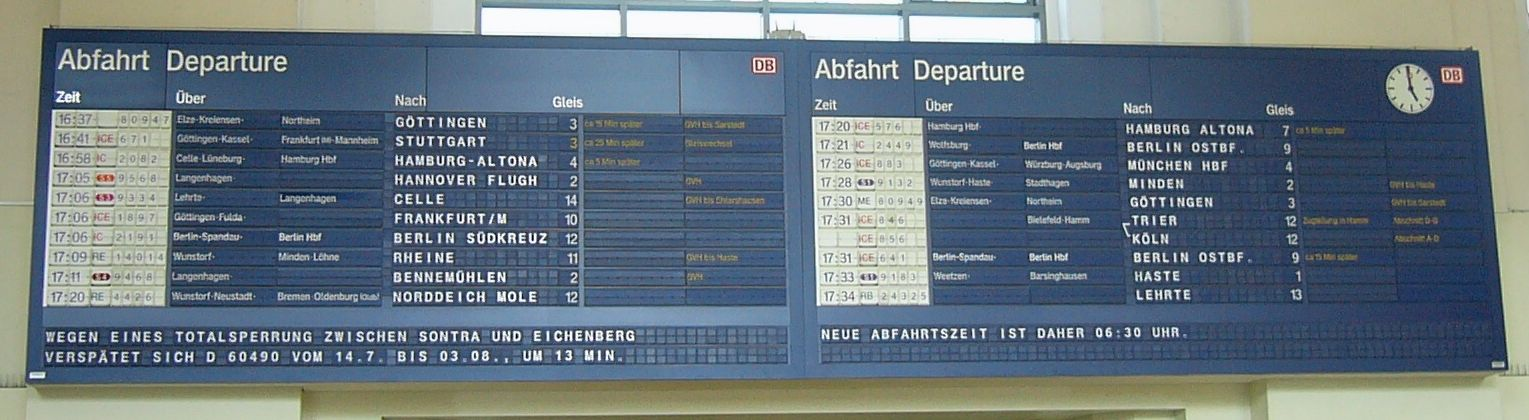
Split-flap departure board at Hannover Hauptbahnhof, Germany

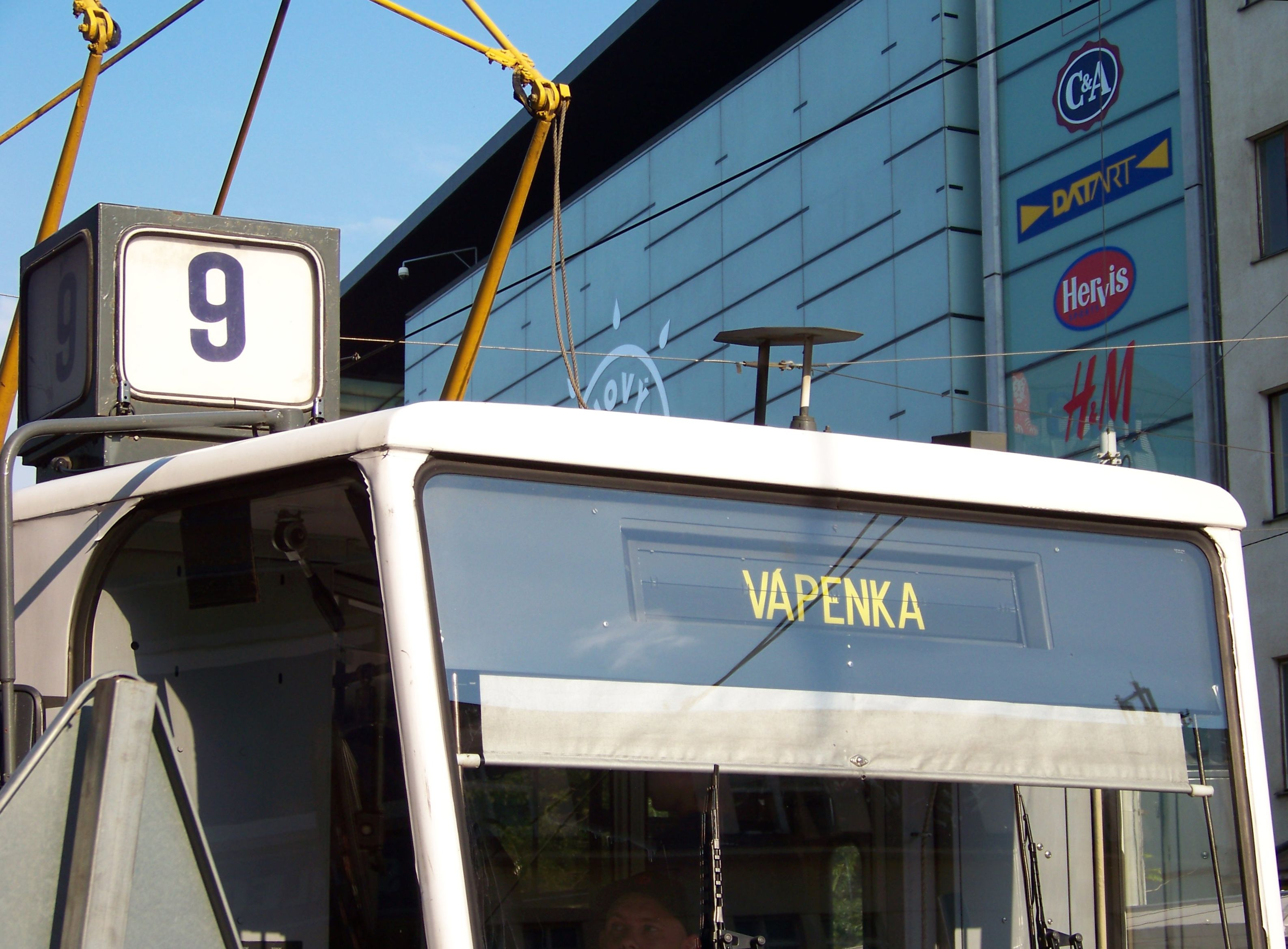
Split-flap display with the name of the end station on the tram Tatra KT8D5 in Prague, Czech Republic

Video of a split-flap display at Trenton Transit Center, United States
