= Provino Valle =

Italian architect

- Born: 10 March 1887; Udine, Kingdom of Italy
- Died: 12 August 1955 (aged 68); Udine, Italy
- Education: Accademia di Belle Arti di Venezia
- Occupation: Architect

Provino Valle (10 March 1887 – 12 August 1955) was an Italian architect.

== Life and career ==
Provino Valle was married to Ave Regè (1899–1981), a teacher. He was the father of four children: the chemist Maria "Mariolina", and the architects and designers Gino, Fernanda "Nani", and Elena "Lella" Valle.

Among the notable works Valle designed in Udine are the Italian war ossuary temple, Villa Leoncini, Palazzo Leskovic, Palazzo Degani Laiolo, and Palazzo Del Torso. He also designed the Eden Cinema, inaugurated in 1922, which was the city's first large theatre with 750 seats. In Tarcento, he created the bridge over the Torre, as well as the church of San Giuseppe and San Luigi in Qualso, Reana del Rojale. Additionally, he designed the Stadio Moretti, inaugurated in 1924.

== Sources ==
- Lanzarini, Orietta (2020). "VALLE, Provino". Dizionario Biografico degli Italiani (in Italian). Vol. 98: Valeriani–Verra. Rome: Istituto dell'Enciclopedia Italiana. ISBN 978-88-12-00032-6.
