= Scrosoppi =

Scrosoppi may refer to:

- Luigi Scrosoppi (1804–1884), Italian priest
- Scrosoppi FC, a Canadian semi-professional soccer club
