= Gino Valle =

Italian architect and designer

- Born: 7 December 1923; Udine, Kingdom of Italy
- Died: 30 September 2003 (aged 79); Udine, Italy
- Occupations: Architect, designer

Gino Valle (7 December 1923 – 30 September 2003) was an Italian architect and designer.

== Life and career ==
Son of architect Provino Valle, he was the brother of Fernanda "Nani" Valle, also architect, Maria, chemist, and Elena "Lella" Vignelli, architect and designer. His first artistic expression was painting, with works selected in 1943. During World War II, he was a prisoner in Germany, working in an armored tracks factory. After the war, he graduated in architecture in Venice in 1948 and began working in his father's studio in Udine, collaborating with his sister Nani. He received a scholarship at Harvard in 1951, where he earned a Bachelor of City and Regional Planning.

He taught at the IUAV University from 1954 to 2001, focusing on geometry and composition. His professional work includes collaborations with companies such as Zanussi, for which he designed the flat refrigerator, and Solari, for which he designed clocks and display systems, winning the Compasso d'Oro in 1956 and 1962. His most iconic clock, the Cifra 3, is exhibited at the Museum of Modern Art in New York. In 2025 the Italian Postal service issued a commemorative stamp featuring Solari and Valle's Cifra 3 clock.

== Works (selection) ==
- Casa Ghetti, Udine (1951)
- Cassa di Risparmio di Udine Building, Udine (1953)
- Cassa di Risparmio di Latisana Building, Latisana (1954)
- Civil Hospital, Portogruaro (1955)
- Casa Bellini, Udine (1956)
- Town Hall, Treppo Carnico (1956)
- Vriz Tower, Trieste (1957)
- Building in Via Marinoni, Udine (with Firmino Toso, 1958–1960)
- Zanussi Office Building, Porcia (1959)
- Casa Manzano, Udine (1965)
- Messaggero Veneto Headquarters, Udine (1967)
- INA Housing, Udine (1970)
- Zanussi Center, Pordenone (1971)
- Business District Galvani, Pordenone (1972–1977)
- Town Hall, Fontanafredda (1973)
- Town Hall, Sutrio (1975)
- IACP Housing, Udine (1976)
- IBM Italia Distribution Center, Basiano (1980)
- Banca Commerciale Italiana Building, New York City (1981)
- Elementary School "Blocco 606", Berlin (1983)
- Padua Courthouse (1984)
- Brescia Courthouse (1986)
- IBM Tower (now INAIL), Rome (1987)
- New Olivetti Office Building, Ivrea (1988)
- Bergamin Office Building, Portogruaro (1991)
- Société Générale Office Building in La Défense, Paris (1991)
- Renovation of the Olympia building, Paris (1996)
- Teatro comunale Città di Vicenza, Vicenza (2001, originally 1987)

== Sources ==
- Alessandra, Capanna (2020). "VALLE, Gino". Dizionario Biografico degli Italiani (in Italian). Vol. 98: Valeriani–Verra. Rome: Institute of the Italian Encyclopaedia. ISBN 978-88-12-00032-6.
- Cherubini, Roberto (1995). "VALLE, Gino". Enciclopedia Italiana: V Appendice. Istituto dell'Enciclopedia Italiana.
