= Padua Courthouse =

Judiciary building in Padua, Italy

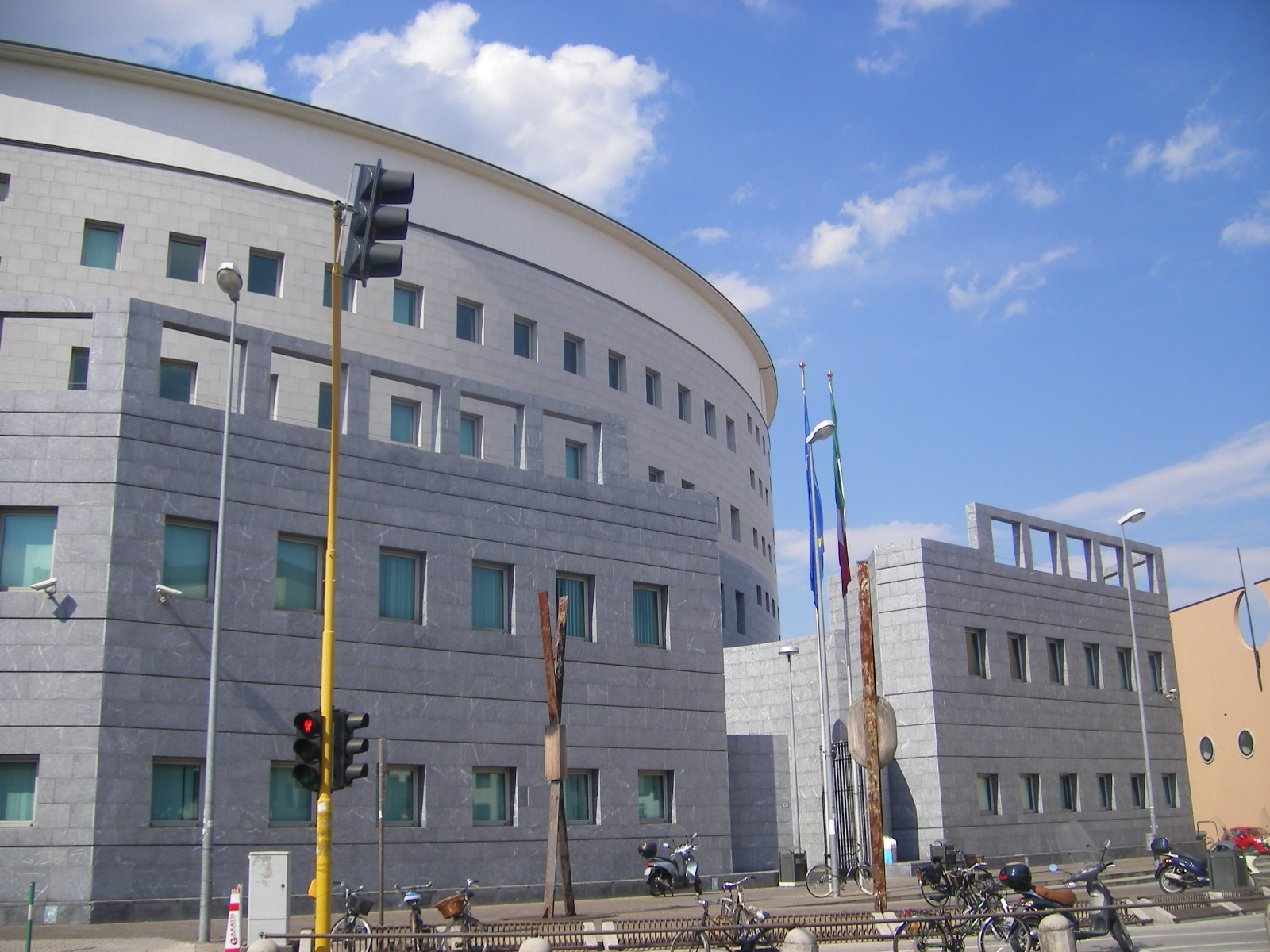
- Interactive map of the Padua Courthouse area

General information
- Type: Courthouse
- Location: Padua, Veneto, Italy
- Coordinates: 45°24′52.77″N 11°53′13.86″E
- Construction started: 1986
- Completed: 1993

Design and construction
- Architect: Gino Valle

The Padua Courthouse (Italian: Palazzo di Giustizia di Padova, lit. 'Palace of Justice of Padua') is a judicial complex located on Via Niccolò Tommaseo in Padua, Italy.

== History ==
The design of the new court building in Padua began in 1984, led by architect Gino Valle, with the assistance of Piera Ricci Menichetti. The building was part of a broader urban redevelopment project that involved the area between the railway station and the Stanga district.

Construction started in 1986 and was completed in 1993.

== Description ==
The courthouse, like other works by architect Valle, is conceived in harmony with the urban context as an integral part of the city.

The building features a large central cylindrical core that rises from a base extending along the street's perimeter. The internal courtyard mirrors the same geometry as the central core and serves as the focal point of the entire structure. It provides access to the judicial offices and acts as a transitional element between the more open, public areas and the restricted ones of the offices and courtrooms.

== Sources ==
- Croset, Pierre Alain (1989). Gino Valle. Progetti e architetture. Milan: Electa. p. 248.
- Croset, Pierre Alain; Skansi, Luka (2018). Modern and Site Specific. The Architecture of Gino Valle, 1946-2003. London: Lund Humphries.
- Francesco Dal Co (1997). Storia dell'architettura Italiana. Il secondo Novecento (1945-1996). Milan: Electa. p. 99.
- De Michelis, Marco (1996). "Nuovo Palazzo di Giustizia di Padova". Domus. Milan. pp. 30–37.
- Longhi, Davide (2012). Novecento. Architetture e città del Veneto. Padua: Il Poligrafo. pp. 570–571.
