= Friuli innovazione =

Friuli Innovazione is a center of research and technology transfer based in Udine (Italy). It was set up in 1999 by the University of Udine, the Industrial Association of Udine, the Province of Udine, the Fiat Research Centre, the Agemont, the Industrial Association of Pordenone and CRUP Foundation and is now attended by other representatives the world of associations and local business. The Center aims to facilitate and foster the collaboration between local enterprises and universities and research centers.

In 2005 was launched the Science and Technology Park of Udine Luigi Danieli, located in the industrial district of Udine, with the support of the Region Friuli-Venezia Giulia. The Park covers an area of over 65,000 square meters, of which 2,700 of covered area and currently hosts research centers, laboratories, R & D companies, start-up and spin-offs operating in the ICT, biotechnology, energy and environment, metallurgy.

In 2006 was set up IGA - Institute of Applied Genomics, a scientific research center active in the field of structural and functional genomics of living organisms. The institute was established at the Park where they set up a center for DNA sequencing and a center for computational biology with machines for parallel computing.

The center is equipped with two second-generation sequencers and a last generation machine (Illumina HiSeq2000) able to decipher a single race some 600 billion bases, corresponding to 6 complete human genomes, up to 60 genomes of plants, or 3,000 bacterial genomes. The fields of application are the study of plant species but also in biology and biomedical diagnostics. Important applications are found in clinical oncology, for purposes of prevention and prediction of the evolution of disease and response to therapy. The IGA provides sequencing and analysis services to universities, research institutes, hospitals and businesses.

The Park also hosts the Laboratory of metallurgy and surface technology and advanced materials, founded in 2006 by Friuli Innovazione and the University of Udine. The Laboratory develops applied research projects and pre-competitive development with companies from the region. Areas of investigation are the chemical composition and morphology and microstructure of materials and metal alloys and test complex mechanical and chemical resistance of materials
