= Terezija Dush =

Venetian Slovene shepherdess, servant and Marian visionary

- Born: September 10, 1845; Porzùs, near Udine, Austrian Empire
- Died: August 16, 1870 (aged 24); Udine, Kingdom of Italy
- Occupations: Herder, Servant, Nanny
- Known for: Marian apparitions in Porzùs (1855)

Terezija Dush, sister Marija Hozana (10 September 1845 – 16 August 1870), was a Venetian Slovene herder, servant, nanny, and Marian seeress.

== Childhood ==
She was born on 10 September 1845 into a poor Slovene family in Porzùs near Udine. Her mother was the farmer Katarina Grimac (1806 – c. 1856) and her father the farmer Jože Dush (1803 – c. 1856). Terezija was the youngest of seven children. She and her family spoke the Venetian Slovene dialect. As a child, she knew no other language. She did not attend school but helped her parents with work and tended the family cow. At the age of nine she began attending catechism with the local parish priest.

== Apparitions ==
In 1855 a cholera epidemic raged in Porzùs. Manuscripts of Zuan Grimaz (Giovanni Grimaz), one of the few literate villagers, describe the epidemic and three apparitions of the Virgin Mary to the villager Terezija Dush. On Saturday, 8 September 1855 (the Nativity of Mary), while grazing the family cow, she reportedly saw a woman in fine peasant clothes who spoke to her in the local dialect: 'Daughter, what are you doing here?'. The woman warned her that it was a feast day, that work on such days is forbidden by God and is a sin. The woman then helped her cut some grass and told her to instruct the villagers to keep Sundays, feasts, and vigils, to fast, not to curse, to pray the Rosary, to hold a procession, and to ask forgiveness. Terezija relayed these instructions, for she believed the woman to be the Mother of God, but the villagers did not believe her.

A second apparition reportedly occurred on 27 September 1855 in the church during the Rosary, again speaking to her in the local dialect. A third took place on 30 September 1855 in the church, when Mary is said to have imprinted a small cross on the back of Terezija's right hand, appearing like shining gold and about three centimetres in size. At that time the Mother of God purportedly entrusted her with a secret that she took to the grave. When the villagers saw the mark, which, sources report, remained until her death, they began to believe her. According to Zuan Grimaz's notes, the cholera epidemic in the village then ceased. Two of Mary's admonitions, written in the local dialect, Nimata klet (Do not curse) and Nimata dielat tu nedejo (Do not work on Sundays), were inscribed on the wall behind the parish church altar.

== Work and death ==
Around 1856 both of her parents died, and she was admitted to a girls’ orphanage in Udine run by the Sisters of Providence and the priest Luigi Scrosoppi, who as latter declared a Roman Catholic saint. In 1860 she left the orphanage and worked for four years as a servant in Cividale. In 1864 she fell ill with tuberculosis, from which she later died. She wished to become a nun but poverty, illness, and her almost nonexstent education were obstacles. According to her own account, the Mother of God appeared to her again in 1864 and encouraged her to enter the Sisters of Providence (Congregazione delle Suore della Provvidenza). On the recommendation of Luigi Scrosoppi, she was accepted on 7 August 1864 as a candidate among the Sisters of Providence, who ran the orphanage where she had lived for four years. Although she was sent to the countryside, her health declined and she returned to Udine. There she worked as a nanny for the girls during their free time at the orphanage. She was received as a novice on 19 March 1867, She was received to the order on 14 September 1868. Her health quickly worsened and she died on 16 August 1870 in Udine.

== Legacy ==
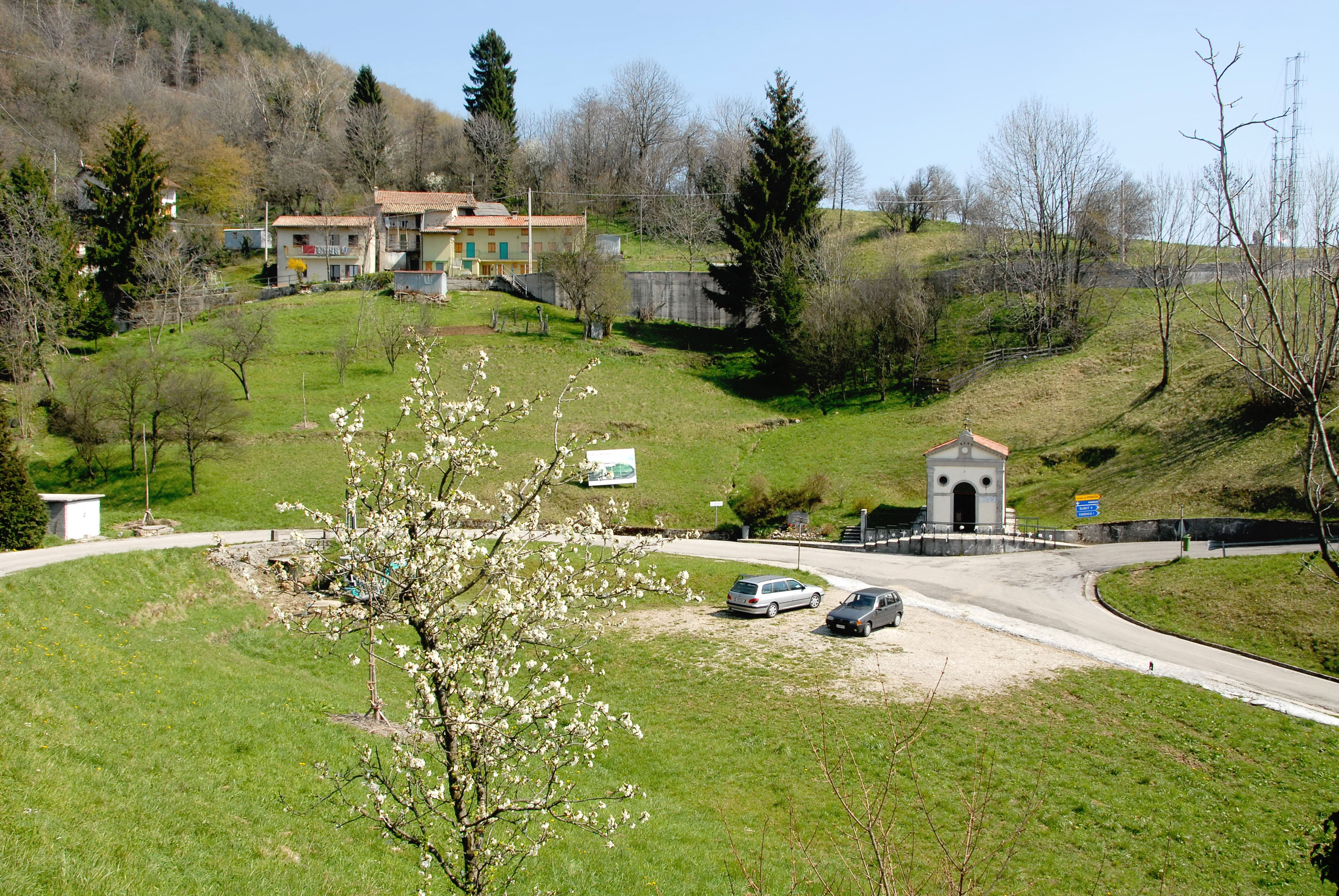
The chapel at the apparition site (2007)

The villagers of Porzùs kept her memory and continued to pray the Rosary at the apparition site. In 1885 a chapel of the Mother of God was built there, attracting primarily Slovene pilgrims from the border regions. In 1886 a painting of the apparition was installed in the chapel. In recent years her story has become better known also among Slovenes in Slovenia.

The Mother of God of Porzùs is also known as Marija žanjica (Mary the Reaper or Mary with the Sickle) and is depicted holding a sickle, which, according to Terezija's account, she held at the first apparition.
