= Mario Benedetti (Italian poet) =

Italian poet and teacher (1955–2020)

- Born: 9 November 1955
- Died: 27 March 2020 (aged 64); Piadena, Province of Cremona, Lombardy, Italy
- Occupations: Poet; educator
- Writing career
- Notable awards: Premio Brancati (2014)

Mario Benedetti (9 November 1955 – 27 March 2020) was an Italian poet. He was among the founders of the contemporary poetry magazines Scarto minimo (published in Padua from 1986 to 1989) and Arsenal littératures (published in Brest from 1999 to 2001).

== Biography ==
After spending the first twenty years of his life in Nimis (Udine), his parents' hometown, he moved to Padua in 1976, where he graduated in Literature with a thesis on the work of Carlo Michelstaedter, after which he graduated in Aesthetics at the Postgraduate School of the same university faculty. He devoted himself to teaching in high schools, first in Padua and then in Milan, where he moved. His life, his poetry and his way of being were strongly characterized by the presence of a chronic disease: a particular form of multiple sclerosis that accompanied him from childhood. Serious episodes due to this pathology occurred in 1999 and 2000. On the night of 14 September 2014 following a heart attack with cerebral hypoxia, he was hospitalized at the San Luca Hospital in Milan, where he was kept in a pharmacological coma for some time. Upon his gradual awakening, he began rehabilitation therapy, and was then transferred to a Milanese health facility to continue treatment.

He died on 27 March 2020, aged 64, of COVID-19, in the care home where he had been living since 2018 in Piadena (Cremona). He was buried on 30 March 2020.

== Literary activity ==
Benedetti started writing poetry in the late 1970s, but became famous among contemporary Italian poets in 2004, when his collections of poems Umana gloria was published by Mondadori. In 2005 he published Reliquiari, a selection of ten previously unpublished poems; three years later he published Pitture nere su carta (also published by Mondadori), another collection of poems, inspired by works of art such as Francisco Goya’s Pinturas negras. After Materiali di un'identità (2010), in which different literary typologies (essay, poem, poetic prose and interview) participated together in the enucleation of the key points of the author's poetics, in 2013 Benedetti published his third main collection of poems, Tersa morte. For this work, Benedetti was awarded the 2014 Brancati Prize for poetry. In 2017 Garzanti published a collection of all his poems.

Benedetti also translated into Italian Michel Deguy's works, and Pjesme by Serbian poet Dejan Ilić.

== Works ==
- Il cielo per sempre, published on poetry magazine “Schema”, Milan, 1989
- I Secoli della primavera, Sestante, Ripatransone, 1992
- Una terra che non sembra vera, Campanotto, Udine, 1997
- Il parco del Triglav, Stampa, Varese, 1999
- Borgo con locanda, Circolo Culturale di Meduno (Pordenone), 2000.
- Umana gloria, Arnoldo Mondadori Editore, Milan, 2004
- Pitture nere su carta, Arnoldo Mondadori Editore, Milan, 2005
- Materiali di un'identità, Transeuropa, Massa, 2010
- Tersa morte, Arnoldo Mondadori Editore, Milan, 2013

Benedetti's works have been included in several anthologies, including Poeti italiani del Secondo Novecento, Mondadori, Milan 2004, and Parola plurale, Sossella, Rome 2005.

== Bibliography ==
- Andrea Zanzotto, review of Il cielo per sempre (“Schema” magazine, 33/34, 1989), Radio della Svizzera Italiana, 11 May 1989.
- Maurizio Cucchi, Sentire come parlano le scarpe, “ La Stampa”, 4 February 2004.
- Giuseppe Genna, New boys on the literary block, “Financial Times”, 7 February 2004.
- Franco Loi, Emozione delle piccole cose, “Il Sole 24 ore”, 22 February 2004.
- Davide Rondoni, “Poesia”, May 2004.
- Enzo Siciliano, Verità fragili come piastrelle, “L'espresso”, 5 August 2004.
- Maurizio Cucchi, in Poeti italiani del Secondo Novecento, Oscar Mondadori, Milan 2004, pp. 1083–1089.
- Raffaella Scarpa, Stare, senza sguardo, “L'Indice”, December 2004.
- Monique Bacelli-Chachuat, “le nouveau recueil”, 73, Champ Vallon, Seyssel 2004.
- Alberto Bertoni, in Trent'anni di Novecento, Book Editore, Bologna 2005.
- Carlo Carabba, in Rassegna dell'ultima poesia italiana, “Nuovi argomenti”, 30, April–June 2005, pp. 277–284
- Gian Mario Villalta, in Il respiro e lo sguardo – Un racconto della poesia italiana contemporanea, BUR, Milan 2005, pp. 48–55.
- Guido Mazzoni, in Almanacco dello Specchio, Mondadori, Milan 2005.
- Il corpo e lo sguardo. Nuovi poeti italiani (edited by Dejan Ilič), Povelija, Belgrade 2006.
- Andrea Afribo, in Poesia contemporanea dal 1980 a oggi, Carocci, Rome 2007, pp. 205–221.
- Gian Luigi Simonetti, Italian Poetry Today: New Ways to Break the Line, translated by Geoffrey Brock, "Poetry" Chicago, December 2007.
- Fernando Marchiori, in Con i poeti, Edizioni L'Obliquo, Brescia 2008, pp. 35–57.
- Daniele Santoro, Pinturas nigras, “ Caffè michelangiolo”, September–December 2008.
- Diego Bentivegna, Viaggio in Italia - Ocho poetas italianos contemporaneos, Sigamos Enamoradas, Buenos Aires, April 2009.
- Jean-Charles Vegliante, 'Mario Benedetti, Le silence du souffle', Le nouveau recueil 2010
- Jean-Charles Vegliante, Una “landa impronunciabile”, forse, «Nuovi Argomenti», 19 November 2013 ().
- Luigia Sorrentino, Materiali di un'identità, 8 June 2010, in Poesia, di Luigia Sorrentino
- Luigia Sorrentino, La realtà nella poesia di Mario Benedetti, 16 September 2014, in Poesia, di Luigia Sorrentino
- Giulio Braccini, Le parole non sono per chi non c'è più. Appunti da una letta di "Tersa morte", 13 February 2014, in Sguardomobile
- Andrea Galgano, Il limite terso di Mario Benedetti, in Frontiera di Pagine II, Aracne, Rome 2017, pp. 807–811.
- Simonetta Longo, Rielaborazione della memoria montaliana in Mario Benedetti, in Il Segnale, year XXXVI, n. 107, June 2017, pp. 65–70. Now in Academia Account Simonetta Longo
