= Tempio Ossario dei Caduti d'Italia =

Church in Udine, Italy

Coordinates: 46.0610°N 13.2278°E

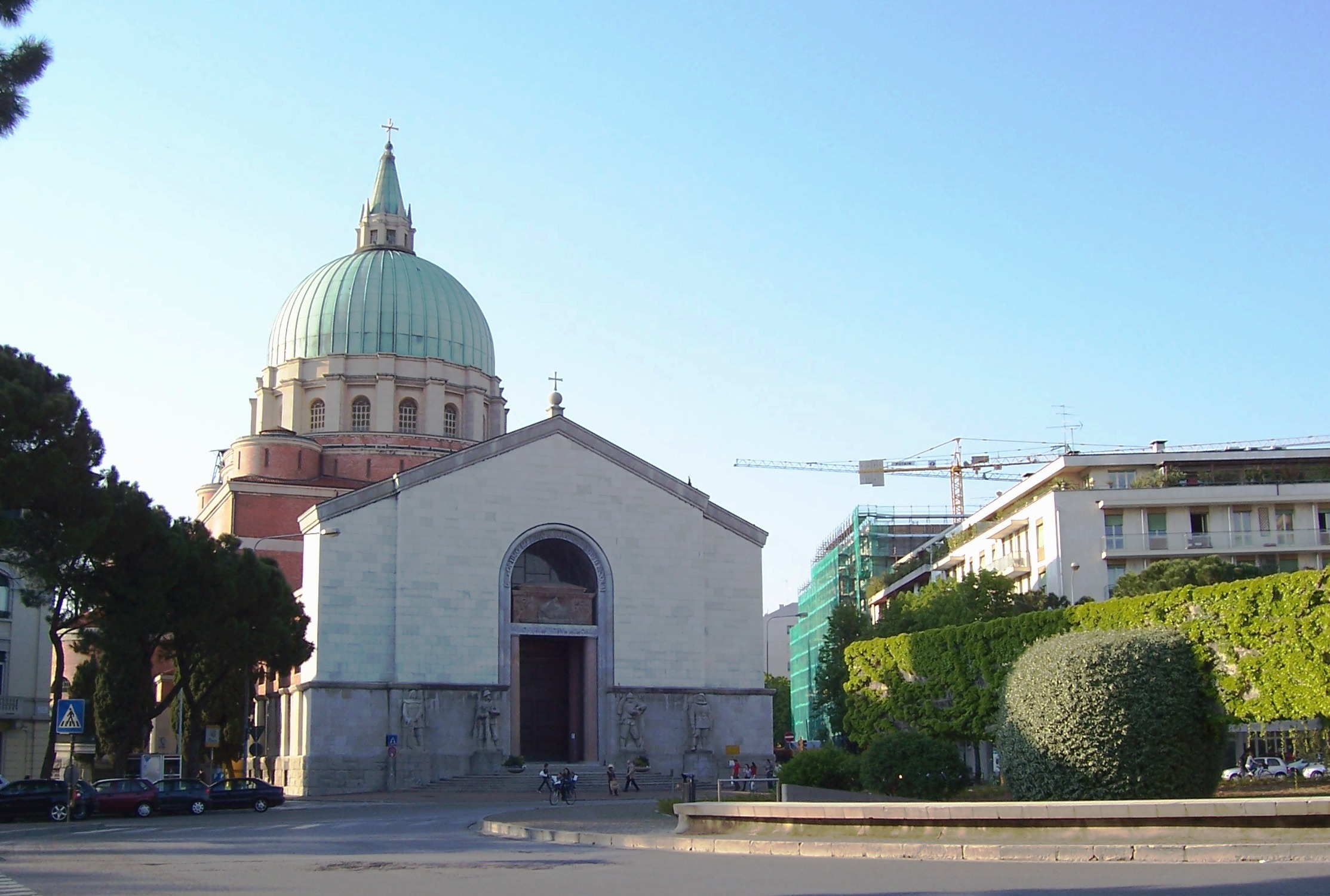
A photo of the church

The Tempio Ossario ai Caduti d'Italia is a church built in 1931 in Udine, in north-eastern Italy. The architects who realised the project are Alessandro Limongelli and Provino Valle.

== Description ==
In front of the facade there are four sculptures: a member in the service of the navy, one of the air force, one of the army and one of the Alpini. The remains of 25,000 Italian soldiers who died during the First World War are buried in the walls of the church's chapels and in the crypt, which is the biggest in Italy.

== Sources ==
- Official website
