= Luigi Scrosoppi =

Italian Roman Catholic priest

Saint Luigi Scrosoppi C.O.
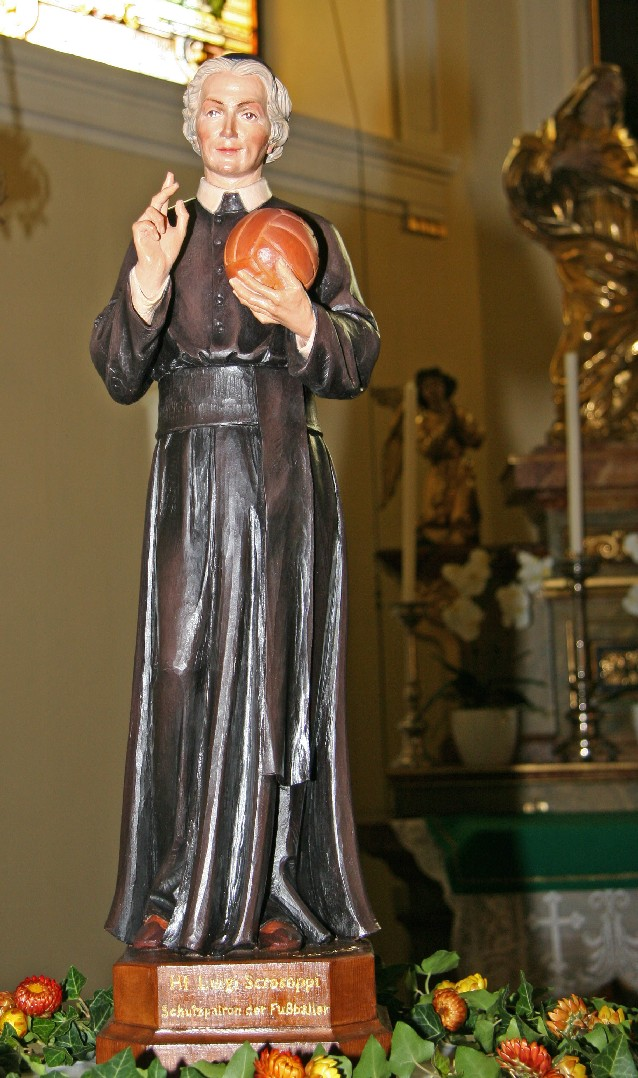
- Born: 4 August 1804; Udine, Italian Republic
- Died: 3 April 1884 (aged 79); Udine, Kingdom of Italy
- Venerated in: Catholic Church
- Beatified: 4 October 1981, Saint Peter's Square, Vatican City by Pope John Paul II
- Canonized: 10 June 2001, Saint Peter's Square, Vatican City by Pope John Paul II
- Feast: 3 April
- Attributes: Priest's cassock; Book; Zucchetto; Rosary
- Patronage: People with HIV/AIDS; Sisters of Providence of Saint Cajetan of Thiene; Soccer & Football players

Luigi Scrosoppi (4 August 1804 – 3 April 1884) was an Italian priest of the Catholic Church who founded the Sisters of Providence of Saint Cajetan of Thiene. He was canonized in 2001.

== Biography ==
Luigi Scrosoppi the last of three brothers born to Domenico Scrosoppi, a jeweler from Udine, and Antonia Lazzarini. His brother Carlo was ordained to the priesthood when Luigi was six and his other brother Gio.

As a teenager, he felt a call to the priesthood and studied before he was ordained to the diaconate in 1826. He was ordained to the priesthood on 31 March 1827 and celebrated his first Mass with his brothers. He helped to manage a children's center that his brother Carlo ran and he was an assistant there in 1829. Later joined the Third Order of Franciscans. As head of the “union of the heart of Jesus Christ,” he devoted himself to the construction of an orphanage and supported his brother Carlo, who also was a priest.

He gave himself tirelessly to fundraising and was soon running an organization that accommodated 100 boarders and 230-day pupils in a building which became known as the House of the Destitute. One of the pupils there was Marian seeres Terezija Dush. Scrosoppi established the Sisters of Providence of Saint Cajetan of Thiene and it was to receive the official approval of Pope Pius IX on 22 September 1871. Luigi joined the Oratory of Saint Philip Neri in 1846 and was elected as its provost on 9 November 1856. On 7 March 1857, he opened a school and home for deaf-mute girls, only surviving for fifteen years.

He died on 3 April 1884 after a long illness.

== Patron Saint of footballers ==
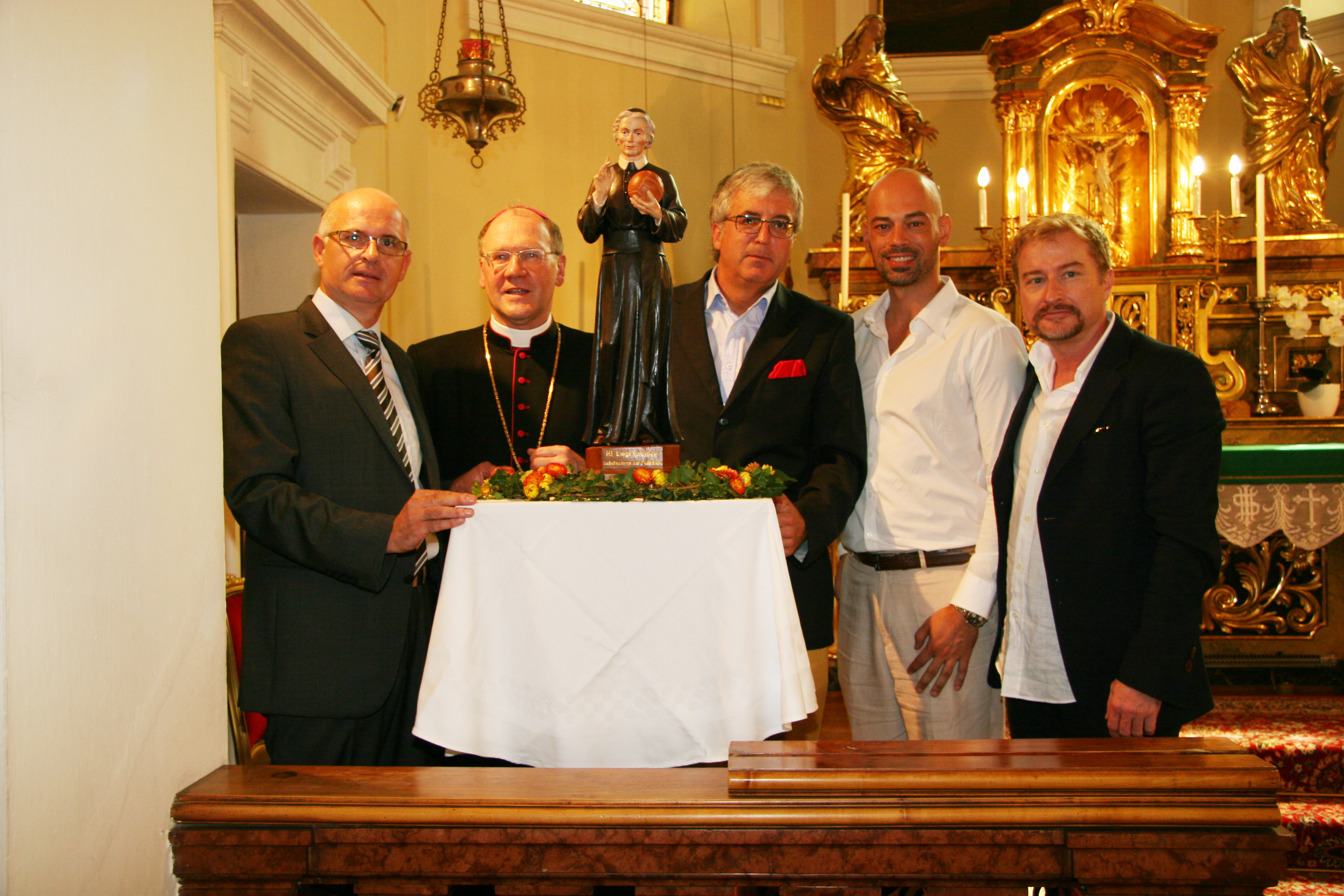
Statue of patron saint S. Luigi Scrosoppi. From left to right: Walter Walzl, Bishop Alois Schwarz, Initiator Manfred Pesek, Filip Stuflesser and Robert Hofferer at the official blessing ceremony on August 22nd, 2010 in the parish of Pörtschach at Wörthersee in Austria.

On 22 August 2010, Scrosoppi was appointed patron saint of footballers by bishop Alois Schwarz at a church service in the Austrian parish of Pörtschach at Wörthersee in coordination with the Roman authorities and Andrea Bruno Mazzocato, the archbishop of Udine.

A patron saint for footballers did not previously exist, thus the idea of appointing Luigi Scrosoppi was initiated by the "Wörthersee Zukunftsinitiative" from football fan Manfred Pesek. Schwarz, the Bishop of Gurk in Klagenfurt, supported the proposal in the appropriate Vatican section "Church and Sport" largely because soccer for youth is of great importance and meaning. Scrosoppi had to be distinguished in a special way to the youth. He represents values that are developed through sport, such as fairness, perseverance, diligence, and determination. Other supporters of the initiative were Nikolaus Knöpffler, Chair of the Department of Applied Ethics and Director of the "Ethikzentrum" at the Friedrich-Schiller-University of Jena, Walter Walzl, Florian Becker, Robert Hofferer and Stefan Gottschling, who helped make the realisation of this initiative possible. The bishop of Udine, the home Diocese of Scrosoppi, was also involved in the approval and preparation of this project.

A Canadian soccer club called Scrosoppi FC is named in honour of him.

== Sainthood ==
Theologians approved Scrosoppi's writings as a prerequisite for beatification on 14 March 1952. The introduction of the cause for sainthood - which conferred upon him the title of Servant of God - came on 27 February 1964 under Pope Paul VI. The declaration that he led a life of heroic virtue allowed for Paul VI to name him Venerable on 12 June 1978. Pope John Paul II beatified him on 4 October 1981 and would also canonize him as a saint on 10 June 2001. His Day of Remembrance in the liturgy is on April 3 (day of his death).

=== The miracle for canonization ===
For the purposes of canonization, the Catholic Church considers to be necessary have a second miracle after the one required for the beatification: in the case of Luigi Scrosoppi, it considered miraculous the healing of Peter Chungu Shitima, a terminal AIDS sufferer, which occurred in 1996.

Peter Chungu Shitima was a student of the oratory of St. Philip Neri of Oudtshoorn, a town near the southern coast of South Africa. In the spring of 1996, he began to experience increasingly serious disturbances, so much so that he was hospitalized, where he was diagnosed with AIDS at the terminal stage.

The religious community in which he belonged began unremitting prayers, to obtain the intercession of Luigi Scrosoppi. In the night between 9 and 10 October 1996, the young man dreamed of Scrosoppi, and suddenly he felt he was cured, awakening, resuming his normal activity.

The healing was observed by doctors Johannes Le Roux and Pete du Toit, both non-Catholics, who could not explain the incident. The case, examined at the Oudtshoorn Curia, was submitted to the Congregation for the Causes of Saints who, on July 1, 2000, promulgated in the presence of Pope John Paul II the miracle decree for the "rapid, complete and lasting healing of Peter Chungu Shitima by polyineuritis and cachexia in positive HIV subject.
