= Stadio Moretti =

Stadium in Udine, Italy

- Il Moretti
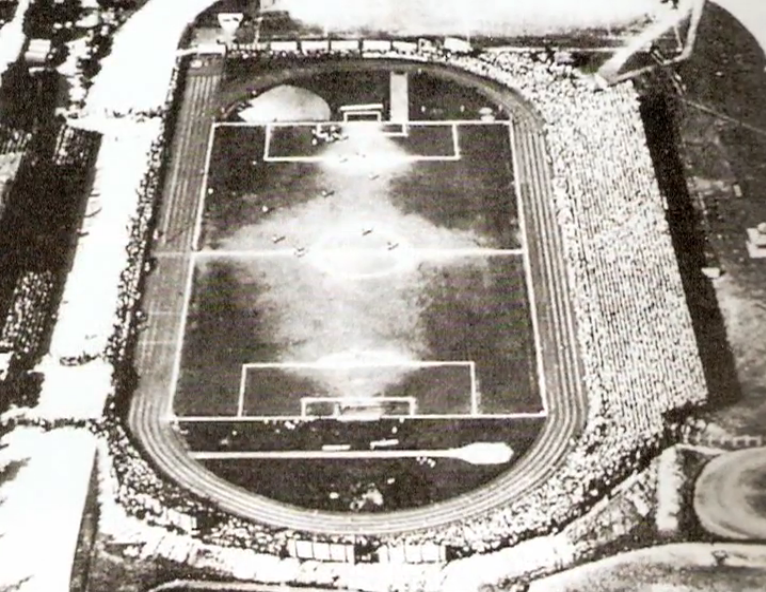
- Interactive map of Stadio Moretti
- Full name: Stadio Moretti
- Location: Udine, Italy
- Owner: Municipality of Udine
- Operator: Udinese Calcio
- Capacity: 25,000
- Surface: Grass

Construction
- Opened: 1920
- Closed: 1976
- Demolished: 1998
- Architect: Provino Valle

Tenant
- Udinese Calcio (1924–1976)

Stadio Moretti was a multi-use stadium in Udine, Italy. It was initially used as the stadium of Udinese Calcio matches. It was replaced by Stadio Friuli in 1976. The capacity of the stadium was 25,000 spectators. It also hosted motorcycle speedway events.

== History ==
=== Football ===
Udinese Calcio's first pitch was located at the back of the "Dante Alighieri" elementary school and was used for football until 1914. The second pitch, located outside Porta Venezia, was inaugurated on 11 October 1914, hosting the Udinese- Venice match, but it did not last long also due to the start of World War I. Upon resuming sporting activity, Udinese built the new pitch in Viale Venezia (located between Via Moretti and Via Mentana) and inaugurated it on 31 August 1919 in a match which saw them lose 1-2 against Padova.

The next stage takes its name from the well-known beer producing brand which had its factory in the immediate vicinity and was the owner of the plant. The structure was used by the local football team, Udinese, within which it achieved the most important result in its history; in 1954-1955, they managed to finish second in the standings behind AC Milan, coming close to winning the scudetto.

The facility was surrounded by an oval dirt track, where speedway motorbikes raced; this made Moretti a special stadium. With the construction of the Friuli Stadium, the structure became dilapidated and for a short period it was the sports center of Udinese, which played the Primavera team's matches there.

The stadium had no electric lighting, therefore, on the occasion of the evening matches of the Coppa Italia during the 1970s, Udinese had to move to the Cosulich Stadium in Monfalcone or the Omero Tognon Stadium in Fontanafredda. Only the covered grandstand remained until 1998, when the structure was demolished.

=== Speedway ===
The stadium was a significant venue for motorcycle speedway and hosted important events. These included qualifying rounds of the Speedway World Championship in 1971 and 1972.
