= Teatro comunale Città di Vicenza =

Coordinates: 45°32′54″N 11°32′03″E

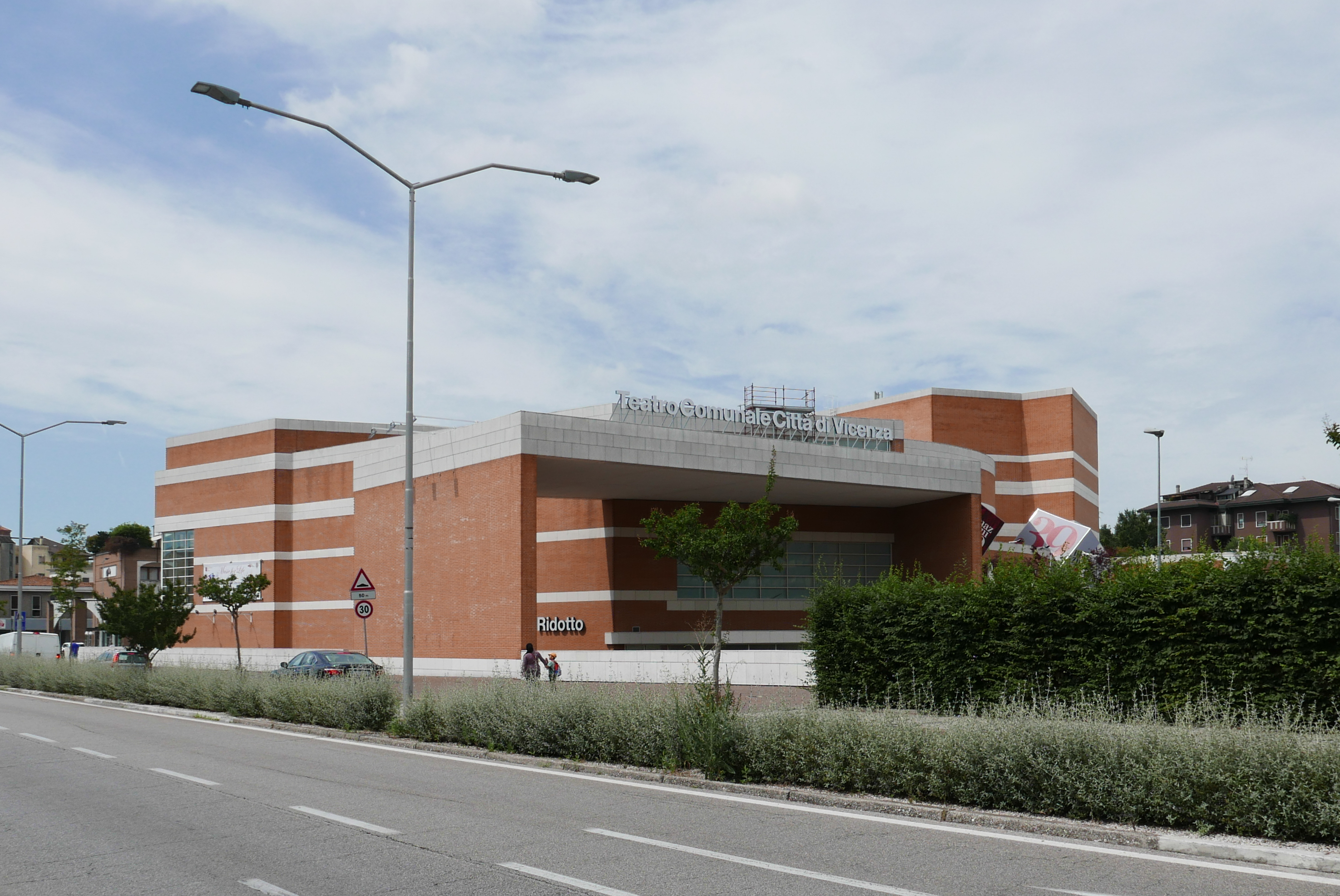
Teatro comunale Città di Vicenza

Teatro Comunale Città di Vicenza (Vicenza City Theatre) is a modern theatre structure consisting of a main hall, the “Sala Maggiore”, with 910 seats and a second one with 380 seats, and the so-called “Ridotto” (Small Hall). The structure was planned by the architect Gino Valle and inaugurated in December 2007. It is located in Vicenza, Italy, a city included in the World Heritage List UNESCO, not far away to Venice.

== History ==
Until World War II, Vicenza had several theatres: first, Palladio's Renaissance masterpiece, the Teatro Olimpico; second, the Eretenio Theatre (built 1784); and lastly the Verdi Theatre (in 1887 inaugurated with this name, but already existing). During World War II these last two structures were destroyed by the Allies' air raid which took place on 2 April 1944.

After the war, construction of another theatre in Vicenza was arduous process: over 36 plans were contemplated, and it was not built and completed for 60 years. In the summer 1969 the citizens were asked to choose among the plans presented by the architects Carlo Scarpa, Franco Albini and Ignazio Gardella. After that, the procedures stopped until the next competition, which took place only in the spring 1978. Among the best plans were those proposed by the Brazilian Oscar Niemeyer and the Dalla Massara brothers. Even if the city council chose Ignazio Gardella's plan, this second attempt was vain too because of several problems on the one hand about the area, seen as unfit by the Ministerium, on the other hand about the building firm.

Consequently, 1985 the area along viale Mazzini was evaluated as convenient for the purpose and 1987 Gino Valle's plan was chosen and approved by the city council. After that, once again all stopped. 2001 it was decided to finance the new theatre through the sale of the milk station, which brought to the city 26 million. A problem with the first building firm, which went bankrupt, delayed the works. They resumed in June 2005 with another construction company which finished them a month and a half early, on 9 November 2007. The Theater was inaugurated on 10 December 2007 with a great performance presented by Milly Carlucci and played by renowned actors such as Lina Sastri, Giorgio Albertazzi and Alessandro Gassman. The same way the Olympic Theatre Orchestra and a great number of superb artists were involved for the musical, opera and dance parts. 2007 the Vicenza City Theatre Foundation was established. It's managing the theatre until 2050. Charter members until 2012 were: Comune di Vicenza, Regione del Veneto, Confindustria Vicenza, Banca Popolare di Vicenza. First President was the mayor Hüllweck and since 15 June 2010 Flavio Albanese, architect and designer from Vicenza, has become the second one.
