= New Olivetti Office Building =

- Nuovo Palazzo Uffici Olivetti
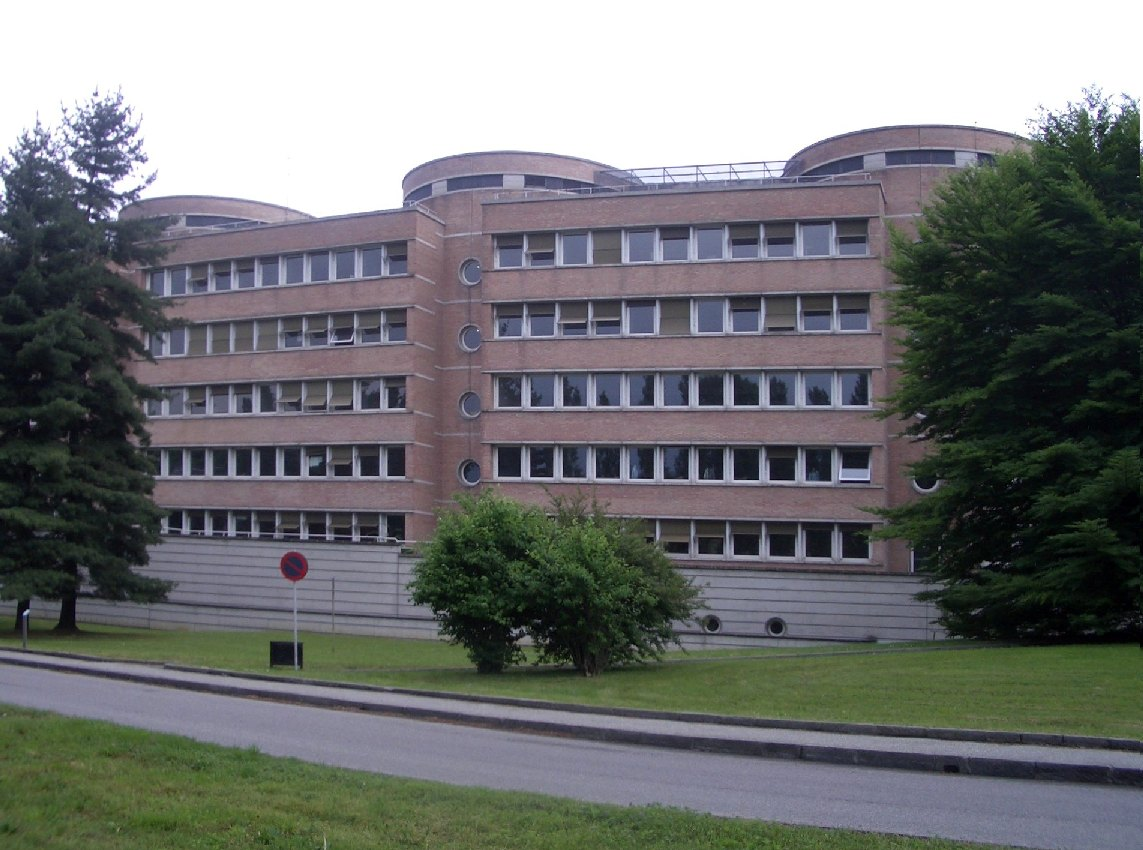
- New Olivetti Office Building in 2005
- Click on the map for a fullscreen view

General information
- Location: Ivrea, Italy
- Coordinates: 45°27′16.92″N 7°51′55.44″E

Design and construction
- Architect: Gino Valle

The New Olivetti Office Building (Italian: Nuovo Palazzo Uffici Olivetti) is a building located in Ivrea, Italy. It is part of the Olivetti complex in Ivrea, which has been designated as a UNESCO World Heritage site under the name Ivrea, Industrial City of the 20th Century.

== History ==
Designed by architect Gino Valle and built between 1985 and 1988, the building is part of the final development phase of the area along Via Jervis in Ivrea. Its construction symbolizes the transformation of the city of Ivrea from an industrial hub into a center providing services to industry between the 1970s and 1980s, and it represents an example of Olivetti's strong corporate identity policy.

== Description ==
The building consists of five blocks arranged to form a broad curve, set back from the street to create a spatial connection with the Olivetti Office Building. Rising six stories above ground, it features a façade articulated by the alternation of horizontal glazed bands and solid brick masonry bands. The windows are recessed and structured by rounded pilasters and concrete floor bands; light-colored blinds, adjustable on each glazed module, provide protection from solar radiation and create a continuously changing appearance.
