= José Zanier =

José Zanier (Udine, Italy, September 18, 1905 – Mar del Plata, Argentina January 30, 1973) was an Italian engineer and pioneer in the construction of thermo-electric power stations supplied by diesel motors. He also worked on projects involving the Italian interconnecting 230 and 150 kV electricity lines, as well as making other contributions to the development of the electro-technical field.

== Biography ==
In 1932 he planned and supervised the construction of the post office and telecommunications building in Vicenza, Italy. Soon thereafter, he focused his attention on the building of the scholastic Noventa Vicentina monument in Vicenza.

In 1936, as director of the technical office of UMET in Rome, part of the Superior Council for Public Works, he developed plans for the Italian 230 and 150 kV interconnection lines with 400 MW of transferable electric power, with their respective transformation and regulation substations.

Just before the outbreak of World War II, he installed the first 20,000 kVA steam-turbo generators, with automatic boilers, in Rome's thermal power station - the first of their kind.

As chief engineer for energy distribution at AGEA, the Italian state electricity and water company, in 1933 he planned the construction and usage of high- and low-tension electricity lines in central and southern Italy, designed to supply electricity to the so-called "Agro Romano".

Immediately after the war he was hired by the Argentine government to construct the modern thermal "Dean Funes" power station in Córdoba, Argentina, which had two 2,500 kW steam-turbo generators.

In 1950, as chief engineer, he planned and built the "9 July" thermal power station in Mar del Plata, the only one of its kind with a power capacity of 20,000 kW. A pipeline connecting to the YPF and subterranean water refrigeration tunnels connected to the sea complete the generator which continues to supply this seaside town today.
