= Brescia Courthouse =

Judiciary building in Brescia, Italy

- Interactive map of the Brescia Courthouse area

General information
- Type: Courthouse
- Location: Brescia, Lombardy, Italy
- Coordinates: 45°31′51.3″N 10°13′14.03″E
- Construction started: 8 April 1999
- Completed: 2004
- Cost: 74,5 million €

Design and construction
- Architect: Gino Valle

The Brescia Courthouse (Italian: Palazzo di Giustizia di Brescia, lit. 'Palace of Justice of Brescia') is a judicial complex located on Via Lattanzio Gambara in Brescia, Italy. It houses the civil and criminal courts of Brescia, the Court of Appeal, judicial offices, and the Public Prosecutor's Office.

== History ==
The project for the new courthouse in Brescia was designed between 1984 and 1988 by architect Gino Valle, in collaboration with Gianpietro Franceschinis, Piera Ricci Menichetti, and Pietro Valle. It was initially conceived for the area of the former slaughterhouse, built in 1875. Due to protests from citizens, associations, and the Superintendence's intervention, a nearby area along the railway was chosen instead.

After few modifications and a lengthy, complex process, construction began in 1999 and was completed in 2004.

== Description ==
The courthouse is situated on a plot measuring 42 meters in depth and 350 meters in length, as the core of the "Citadel of Justice"—a complex of buildings with various functions, including offices, deliberation chambers, and courtrooms.

The structure features a base clad in Botticino marble that rises toward the adjacent railway, while the central section is constructed with exposed brick. The crowning element is made of painted white concrete, giving the building an imposing and functional appearance.

The building is organized efficiently, with offices divided into three main sections. At the center is the semicircular auditorium housing the Court of Appeal and the Attorney General's offices, framing an entrance square. To the east, there are three transverse blocks attached to another wall, designated for the Magistrate's Court, the Public Prosecutor's Office, and judicial services. To the west extends the linear body of the courthouse, featuring two large courtrooms.

== Sources ==
- Ventura, Paolo (1992). Itinerari di Brescia Moderna. Florence: Alinea. p. 312.
- "Nuovo Palazzo di Giustizia, Brescia – 1984–2004". Costruire in laterizio. No. 114. 2006. pp. 14–19.
- Croset, Pierre Alain; Skansi, Luka (2018). Modern and Site Specific. The Architecture of Gino Valle, 1946–2003. London: Lund Humphries. pp. 260–261.
