= Udine =

Udine Udin (Friulian)
- Comune
- Comune di Udine
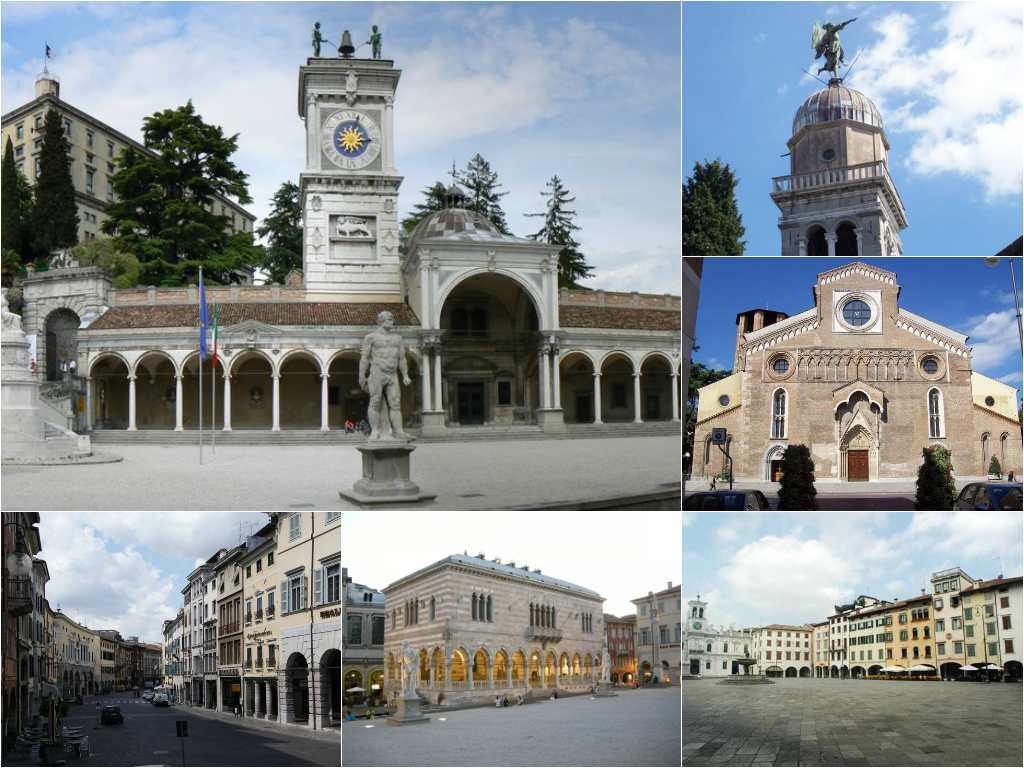
- Top: San Giovanni Clock Tower and Libertà Square; Angel monument at Udine Santa Maria Church; and Udine Cathedral (left to lower right); bottom: Via Mercatovecchio; Loggia del Lionello; and Matteotti Square (left to right)

- Flag Coat of arms

- Location within the Regional Decentralization Entity of Udine.

- Location within Italy Location within Friuli-Venezia Giulia
- Coordinates: 46°04′N 13°14′E
- Country: Italy
- Region: Friuli-Venezia Giulia
- Province: Udine
- Frazioni: See list

Government
  - Mayor: Alberto Felice De Toni (Centre-left independent)

Area
  - Total: 57.17 km^{2} (22.07 sq mi)
- Elevation: 113 m (371 ft)

Population (2026)
  - Total: 98,501
  - Density: 1,723/km^{2} (4,462/sq mi)
- Demonym: Udinese
- Time zone: UTC+1 (CET)
  - Summer (DST): UTC+2 (CEST)
- Postal code: 33100
- Dialing code: 0432
- ISTAT code: 030129
- Saint day: 12 July
- Website: Official website

Udine (US: /ˈuːdiːneɪ/ OO-dee-nay; Italian: [ˈuːdine]; Friulian: Udin; Latin: Utinum; Slovene: Videm) is a city and comune (municipality) in northeastern Italy, in the middle of the Friuli-Venezia Giulia region, between the Adriatic Sea and the Carnic Alps. It is the capital of the Regional decentralization entity of Udine.

With a population of 98,501 as of 2026, it is the 2nd-largest city in Friuli-Venezia Giulia and the 46th-largest in Italy.

== Names and etymology ==
Udine was first attested in medieval Latin records as Udene in 983 and as Utinum around the year 1000. The origin of the name Udine is unclear. It has been tentatively suggested that the name may be of pre-Roman origin, connected with the Indo-European root *ou̯d^{h}- 'udder' used in a figurative sense to mean 'hill'. The Slovene name Videm (with final -m) is a hypercorrection of the local Slovene name Vidan (with final -n), based on settlements named Videm in Slovenia. The Slovene linguist Pavle Merkù characterized the Slovene form Videm as an "idiotic 19th-century hypercorrection."

== History ==
Udine is the historical capital of Friuli. The area has been inhabited since the Neolithic age.

Based on an old Hungarian legend, Attila (?–453), the leader of the Huns, built a hill there, when besieging Aquileia, because he needed a billet for his winter quarters: he instructed his soldiers to bring soil in their helmets and shields, because the landscape was too flat, without any hill. He established the town there, and built a square tower.

After the fall of the Western Roman Empire, the area increased in importance after the decline of Aquileia, then further after the decline of Cividale. In AD 983 Udine was mentioned for the first time, with the donation of the Utinum castle by emperor Otto II to the Patriarchs of Aquileia, then the main feudal lords of the region. From 1222 it became one of the residences of the Patriarchs, thanks to the patriarch Bertoldo of Andechs, who moved from Cividale to Udine following an earthquake that damaged his residence. In 1223, with the foundation of the market, the city became finally the most important in the area for economy and trade, and also became the Patriarch's seat.

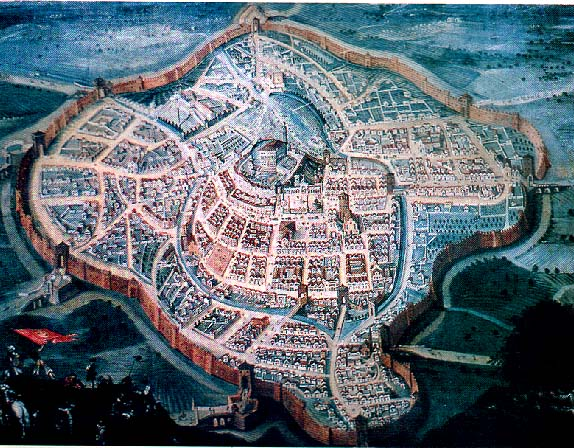
Udine as it appeared in 1650

In 1420, it was conquered by the Republic of Venice. In 1511, it was the seat of a short civil war, which was followed by an earthquake and a plague. Udine remained under Venetian control until 1797, being the second largest city in the state.

After the fall of Venice, it was part of the Habsburg Venetian Province (1798–1805). After the short French domination which ensued, being part of the Napoleonic Kingdom of Italy, it was part of the Austrian Kingdom of Lombardy-Venetia, and was included in the newly formed Kingdom of Italy in 1866.

In 1880 the city council ordered that the remaining sections of the medieval walls should be demolished to provide space for urban expansion.

During World War I, from May 1915 to October 1917, Udine became the seat of the Italian High Command and was nicknamed "Capitale della Guerra" ("War Capital"). After the battle of Caporetto, it was occupied by the Germans in late 1917 and by the Austro-Hungarians in 1918 until after the Battle of Vittorio Veneto in 1918. After the war it was made capital of a short-lived province (Provincia del Friuli) which included the current provinces of Gorizia, Pordenone and Udine. After September 8, 1943, when Italy surrendered to the Allies in World War II, the city was under direct German administration, which ceased in April 1945.

== Geography ==
The city is located in the center of the historical region of Friuli. It is just over 20 km from Slovenia as the crow flies, and approximately 54 km from Austria. This places it in a strategic position, at the intersection of the European east-west (Mediterranean Corridor V) and north-south (Via Iulia Augusta, now recognized by the European Union as part of the Baltic-Adriatic Corridor) routes, on the route leading to Austria and Eastern Europe.

It lies in the high plain, a few kilometers from the hilly area, and is bordered by the Cormor stream to the west and the Torre stream to the east. At the center of the city, it sits on an isolated hill, atop which sits the castle: according to legend, the hill was built by Attila the Hun to overlook the fire he himself set on the city of Aquileia. In reality it was thought that it was formed by conglomeratic rocks older than 100,000 years, while recent archaeological excavations have demonstrated that it is an artificial relief, devoid of rocks.

=== Climate ===
Udine has a humid subtropical climate (Köppen: Cfa). Precipitation is abundant all year round with spring and autumn being the wettest seasons. The highest temperature recorded was 38.2 °C (101 °F) on July 21, 2006 while the lowest temperature recorded was −18.6 °C (−1 °F) on December 19, 2009.

Climate data for Udine (Rivolto Air Base) (1991–2020, extremes 1969–present)
Month	Jan	Feb	Mar	Apr	May	Jun	Jul	Aug	Sep	Oct	Nov	Dec	Year
Record high °C (°F)	18.6 (65.5)	23.2 (73.8)	25.6 (78.1)	29.5 (85.1)	33.2 (91.8)	36.2 (97.2)	38.2 (100.8)	37.0 (98.6)	34.4 (93.9)	29.8 (85.6)	25.3 (77.5)	17.4 (63.3)	38.2 (100.8)
Mean daily maximum °C (°F)	8.5 (47.3)	10.2 (50.4)	14.5 (58.1)	18.5 (65.3)	23.0 (73.4)	27.2 (81.0)	29.6 (85.3)	29.4 (84.9)	24.4 (75.9)	19.1 (66.4)	13.6 (56.5)	9.4 (48.9)	18.9 (66.0)
Daily mean °C (°F)	4.0 (39.2)	5.0 (41.0)	9.0 (48.2)	13.0 (55.4)	17.6 (63.7)	21.7 (71.1)	23.7 (74.7)	23.5 (74.3)	18.7 (65.7)	14.0 (57.2)	9.1 (48.4)	4.7 (40.5)	13.7 (56.7)
Mean daily minimum °C (°F)	−0.3 (31.5)	0.1 (32.2)	3.6 (38.5)	7.5 (45.5)	12.2 (54.0)	16.1 (61.0)	17.9 (64.2)	17.6 (63.7)	13.3 (55.9)	9.2 (48.6)	4.8 (40.6)	0.4 (32.7)	8.5 (47.3)
Record low °C (°F)	−14.6 (5.7)	−11.6 (11.1)	−10.0 (14.0)	−4.8 (23.4)	1.4 (34.5)	5.6 (42.1)	8.2 (46.8)	6.6 (43.9)	3.0 (37.4)	−3.2 (26.2)	−8.4 (16.9)	−18.6 (−1.5)	−18.6 (−1.5)
Average precipitation mm (inches)	55.2 (2.17)	52.3 (2.06)	69.3 (2.73)	83.8 (3.30)	101.8 (4.01)	92.3 (3.63)	75.4 (2.97)	82.0 (3.23)	116.6 (4.59)	111.5 (4.39)	125.4 (4.94)	72.6 (2.86)	1,038.3 (40.88)
Average snowfall cm (inches)	1.0 (0.4)	1.3 (0.5)	0.2 (0.1)	0.0 (0.0)	0.0 (0.0)	0.0 (0.0)	0.0 (0.0)	0.0 (0.0)	0.0 (0.0)	0.0 (0.0)	0.4 (0.2)	1.1 (0.4)	4 (1.6)
Average precipitation days (≥ 1.0 mm)	4.9	4.3	6.1	8.3	9.7	8.4	7.3	7.0	7.4	8.0	7.8	6.4	85.7
Average relative humidity (%)	74.9	71.7	70.2	70.1	71.0	71.1	69.6	69.0	71.1	74.7	77.6	76.2	72.3
Average dew point °C (°F)	−1.1 (30.0)	−0.9 (30.4)	2.4 (36.3)	6.3 (43.3)	11.3 (52.3)	14.7 (58.5)	16.5 (61.7)	16.1 (61.0)	12.5 (54.5)	9.0 (48.2)	3.7 (38.7)	0.1 (32.2)	7.6 (45.6)
Mean monthly sunshine hours	146.3	170.8	198.7	198.9	234.4	234.9	274.0	264.7	194.7	174.8	131.7	142.9	2,366.9
Mean daily daylight hours	9.1	10.4	11.9	13.6	15.0	15.7	15.3	14.1	12.5	10.9	9.5	8.7	12.2
Average ultraviolet index	2	3	5	6	8	9	9	8	6	4	3	2	5
Source 1: NOAA (dew point 1981–2010)
Source 2: Servizio Meteorologico, Nomadseason(UV), Weather atlas(Snow-Daylight)

== Demographics ==
Historical population
Year	Pop.	±%
1871	29,425	—
1881	31,954	+8.6%
1901	36,899	+15.5%
1911	46,916	+27.1%
1921	53,635	+14.3%
1931	63,712	+18.8%
1936	63,098	−1.0%
1951	72,908	+15.5%
1961	86,188	+18.2%
1971	100,794	+16.9%
1981	102,021	+1.2%
1991	99,189	−2.8%
2001	95,030	−4.2%
2011	98,287	+3.4%
2021	97,736	−0.6%
Source: ISTAT

As of 2026, the population is 98,501, of which 47.5% are males, and 52.5% are females. Minors make up 13.2% of the population, and seniors make up 27.4%.

The nearby area close to the border has a Slovene population estimated at 2,000. A 1475 document mentions Slovene as the language of the "lower class" in the town, and the Udine Manuscript of 1458 contains Slovene vocabulary. Alasia da Sommaripa's Italian–Slovenian dictionary was printed in Udine in 1607.

Udine is one of the municipalities in Friuli where Friulian is taught.

=== Immigration ===
As of 2025, immigrants make up 20.0% of the population. The 5 largest foreign countries of birth are Albania, Romania, Ukraine, Ghana, and Pakistan. Of the 4 provincial capitals of the Friuli-Venezia Giulia region, it has the 2nd-highest share of immigrants, higher than the regional average of 15.6%, but lower than Pordenone's 22.0%.

== Sights ==
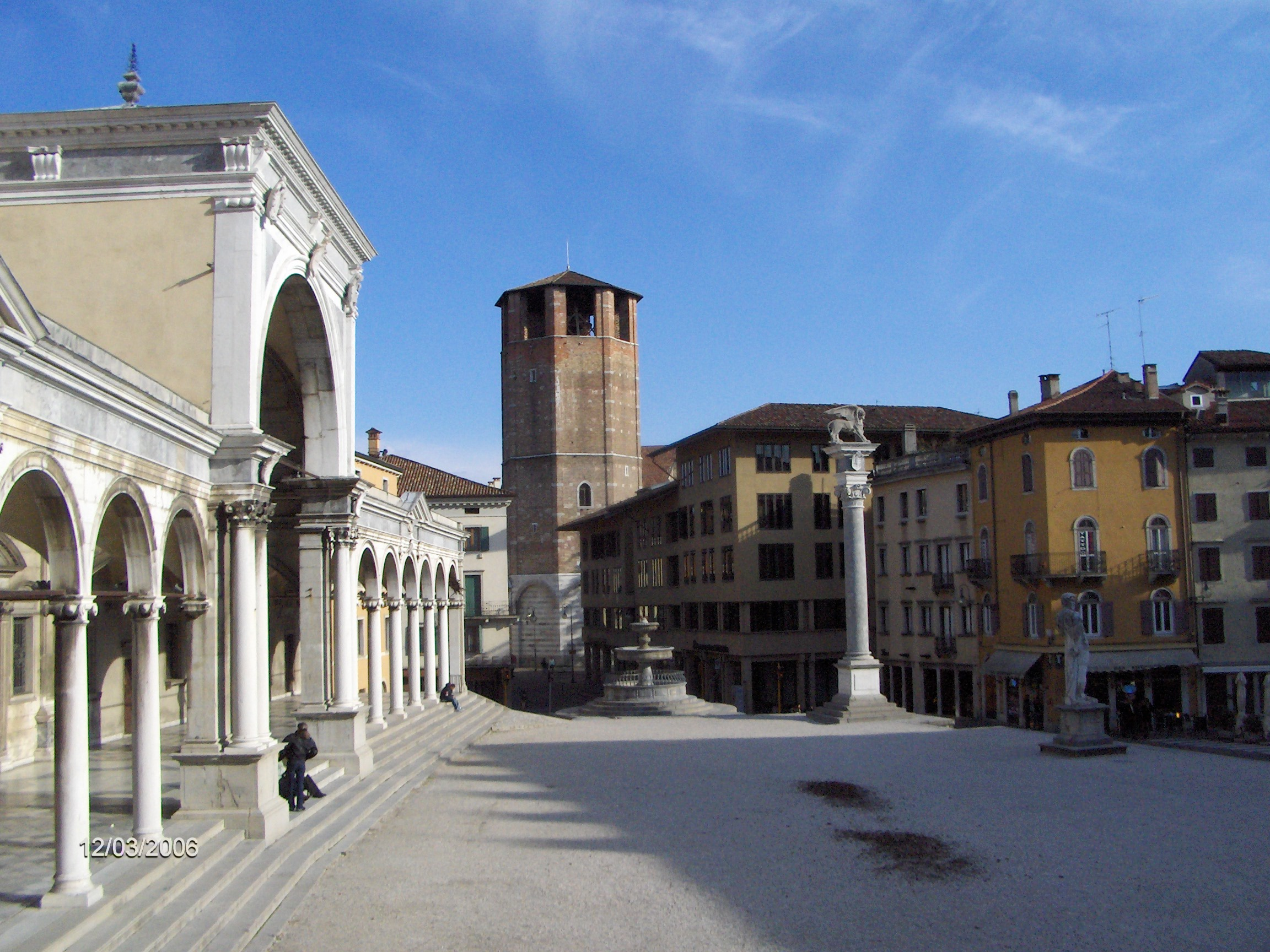
Piazza della Libertà and the Loggia di San Giovanni

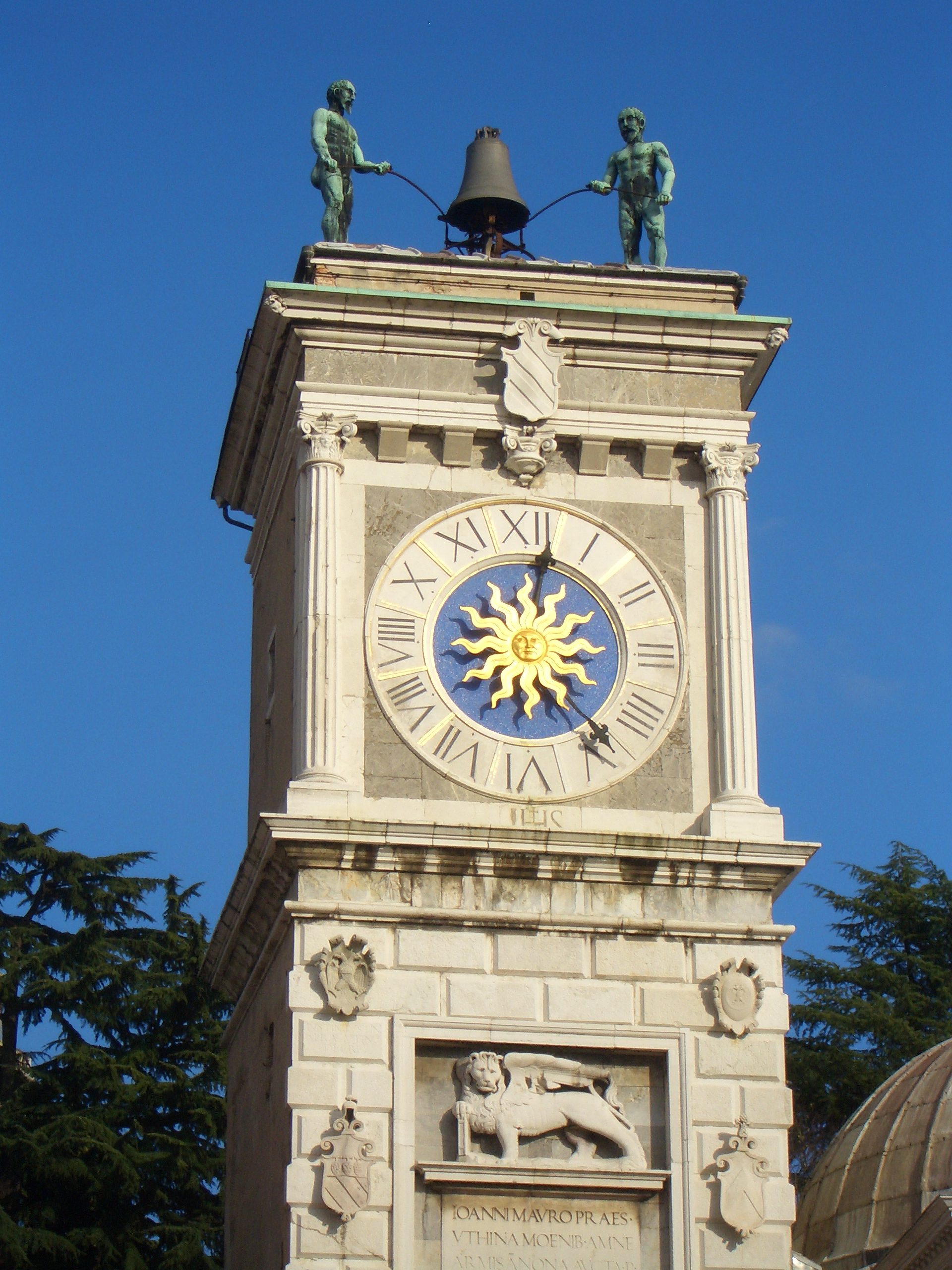
Loggia di San Giovanni, clock tower (Torre dell'Orologio)

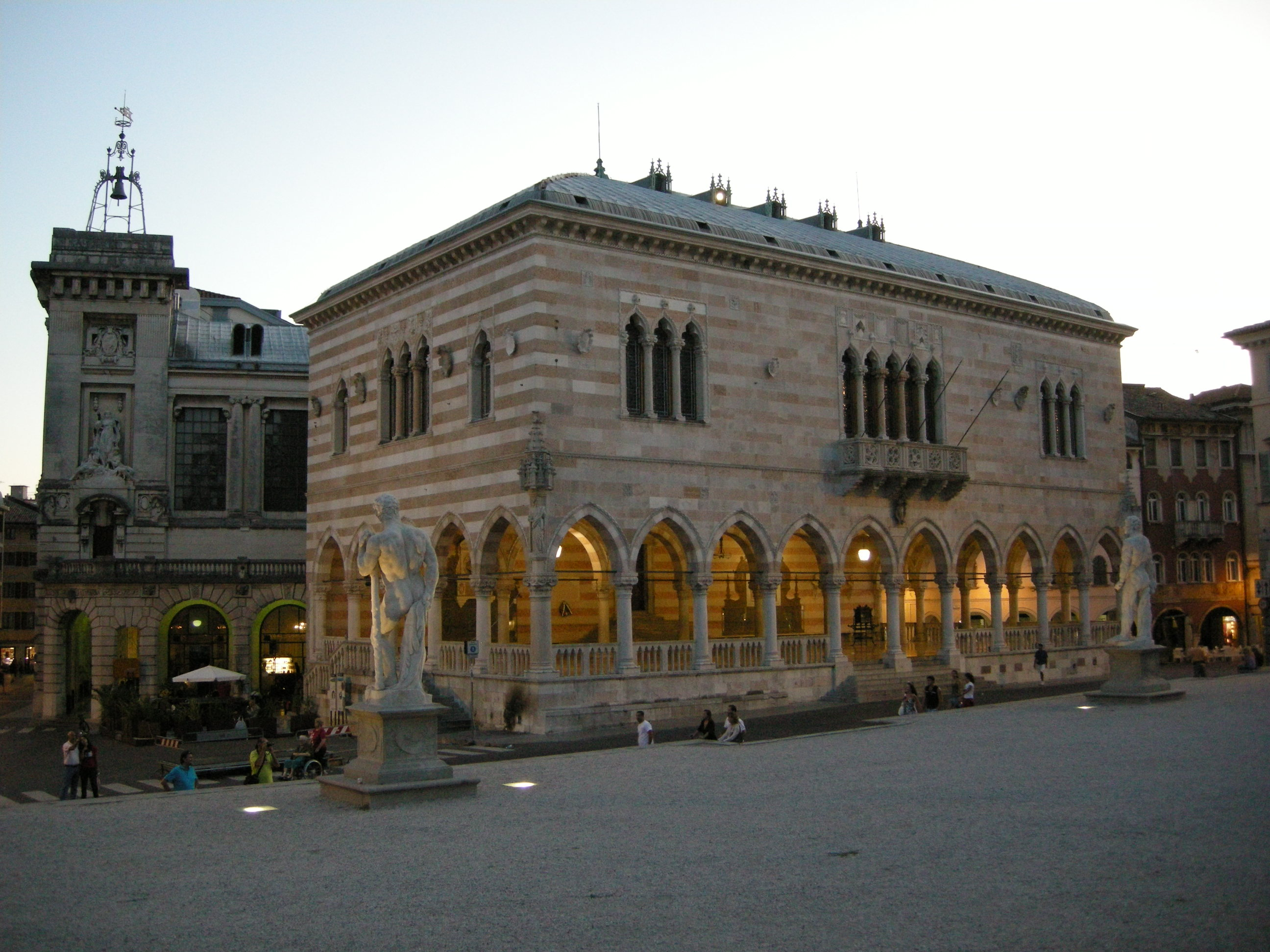
Loggia del Lionello

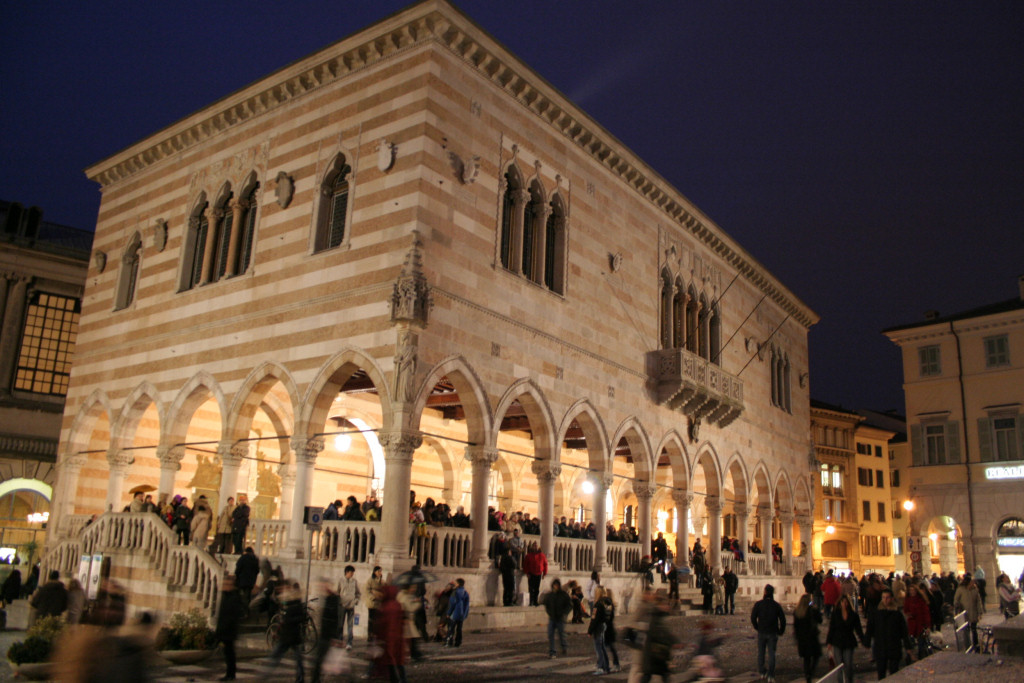
By night

The old residence of the patriarchs of Aquileia, the palazzo Patriarcale, was erected in 1517 in place of the older one destroyed by an earthquake in 1511. In 1708 the patriarch Dionisio Dolfin called upon the architect Domenico Rossi, who built the wing with the library and the oval staircase, raised the central body by creating the portal, completed the north wing and, in 1725, the main staircase. Under the Austrians it was used as a prison.

A recension of the Visigothic code of laws, called the Breviary of Alaric, was formerly preserved in the cathedral archives, in a manuscript known as the Codex Utinensis, which was printed before it was lost.

In the 1550s, Andrea Palladio erected some buildings in Udine. The Oratorio della Purità has 18th-century frescoes by Giambattista Tiepolo and his son Giandomenico.

The church dedicated to St. Mary of the Castle is probably the oldest in Udine, judging from extant fragments dating back to the Lombard era. It lost its parish status in 1263, when it was annexed to the larger parish of Saint'Odorico (now the cathedral). It has been renovated many times over the centuries: the façade, for example, was entirely rebuilt after the 1511 Idrija earthquake. Its three naves preserve the suggestive atmosphere of silence and contemplation, which is often found in old churches. The Venetian Governor, Tommaso Lippomano, commissioned the Venetian Gothic portico with steps and ramps leading down the hill in 1487.

In the principal square (Piazza della Libertà) stands the town hall (Loggia del Lionello) built in 1448–1457 in the Venetian-Gothic style opposite a clock tower (Torre dell'Orologio) resembling that of the Piazza San Marco at Venice. It was begun in 1448 on a project by Nicolò Lionello, a local goldsmith, and was rebuilt following a fire in 1876. The new design was projected by the architect Andrea Scala.

Opposite the Loggia del Lionello is the Loggia di San Giovanni, a Renaissance structure designed by Bernardino da Morcote. Other noteworthy monuments in the square are the Fountain by Giovanni Carrara, an architect from Bergamo (1542); the Columns bearing the Venetian Lion and the Statue of Justice (1614), the statues of Hercules and Cacus and the Statue of Peace (1819) which was donated to Udine by Emperor Francis I to commemorate the peace Treaty of Campoformido.

The Cathedral of Udine is an imposing edifice whose construction started in 1236, on a Latin cross-shaped plan with three naves and chapels along the sides. The church was consecrated in 1335 as Santa Maria Maggiore. At the beginning of the 18th century, a radical transformation project involving both the exterior and the interior was undertaken at the request and expense of the Manin family. The Baroque interior has monumental dimensions and contains many works of art by Tiepolo, Amalteo, and Ludovico Dorigny. On the ground floor of the bell tower (built from 1441 over the ancient baptistry) is a chapel which is completely adorned with frescoes by Vitale da Bologna (1349).

The city centre is dominated by the Udine Castle, built by the Venetians from 1517 over a Lombard fortification ruined by an earthquake in 1511. The current Renaissance appearance dates from the intervention of Giovanni da Udine, who finished the works starting from 1547. The castle houses one of the most ancient Parliament Halls of Europe.

=== Other points of interest ===
- Orto Botanico Friulano, a botanical garden
- Parco Botanico Friulano "Cormor", a park and botanical garden
- Tempio Ossario dei Caduti d'Italia, 1931 church

=== Gallery ===
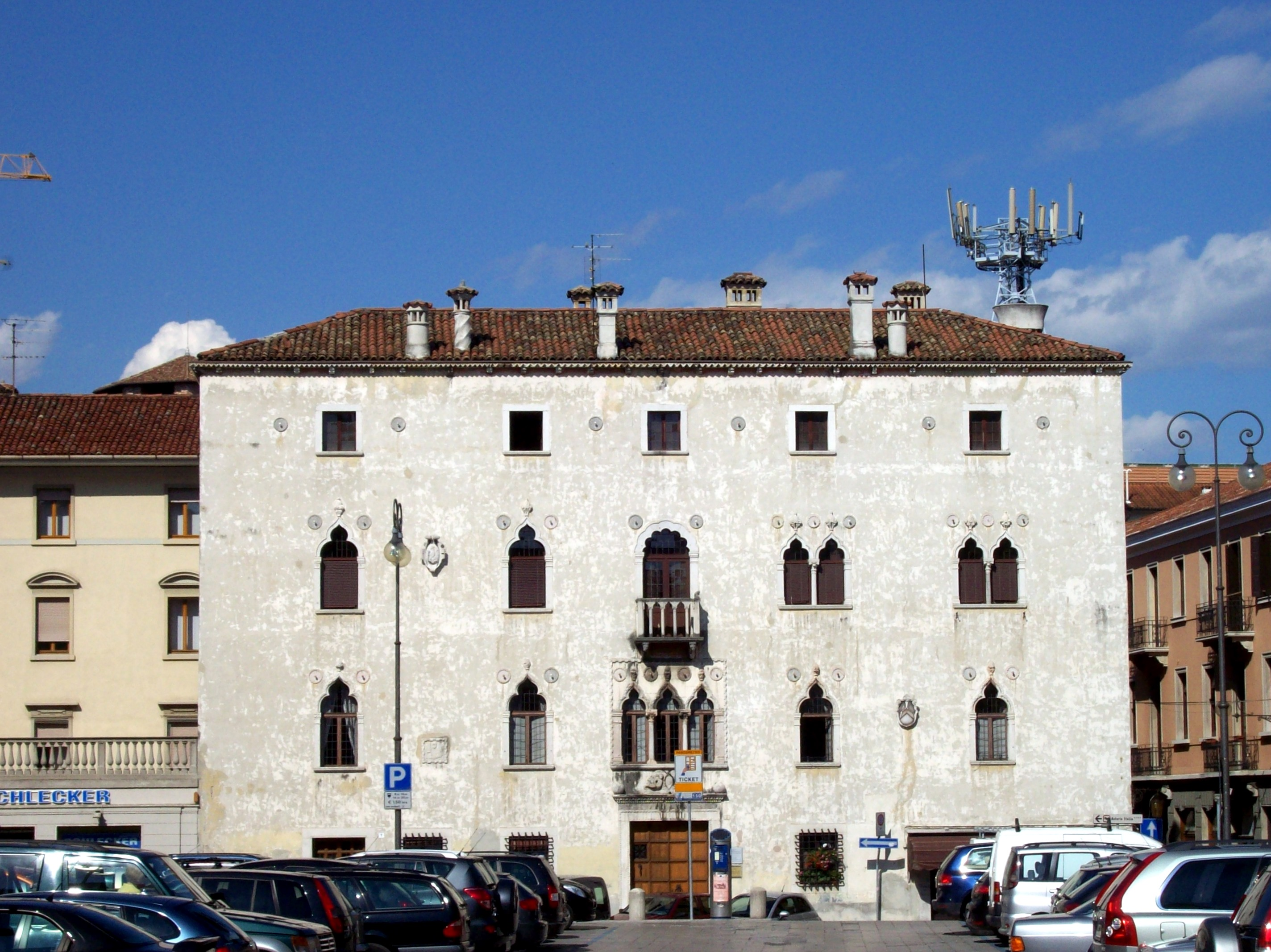
Venetian house

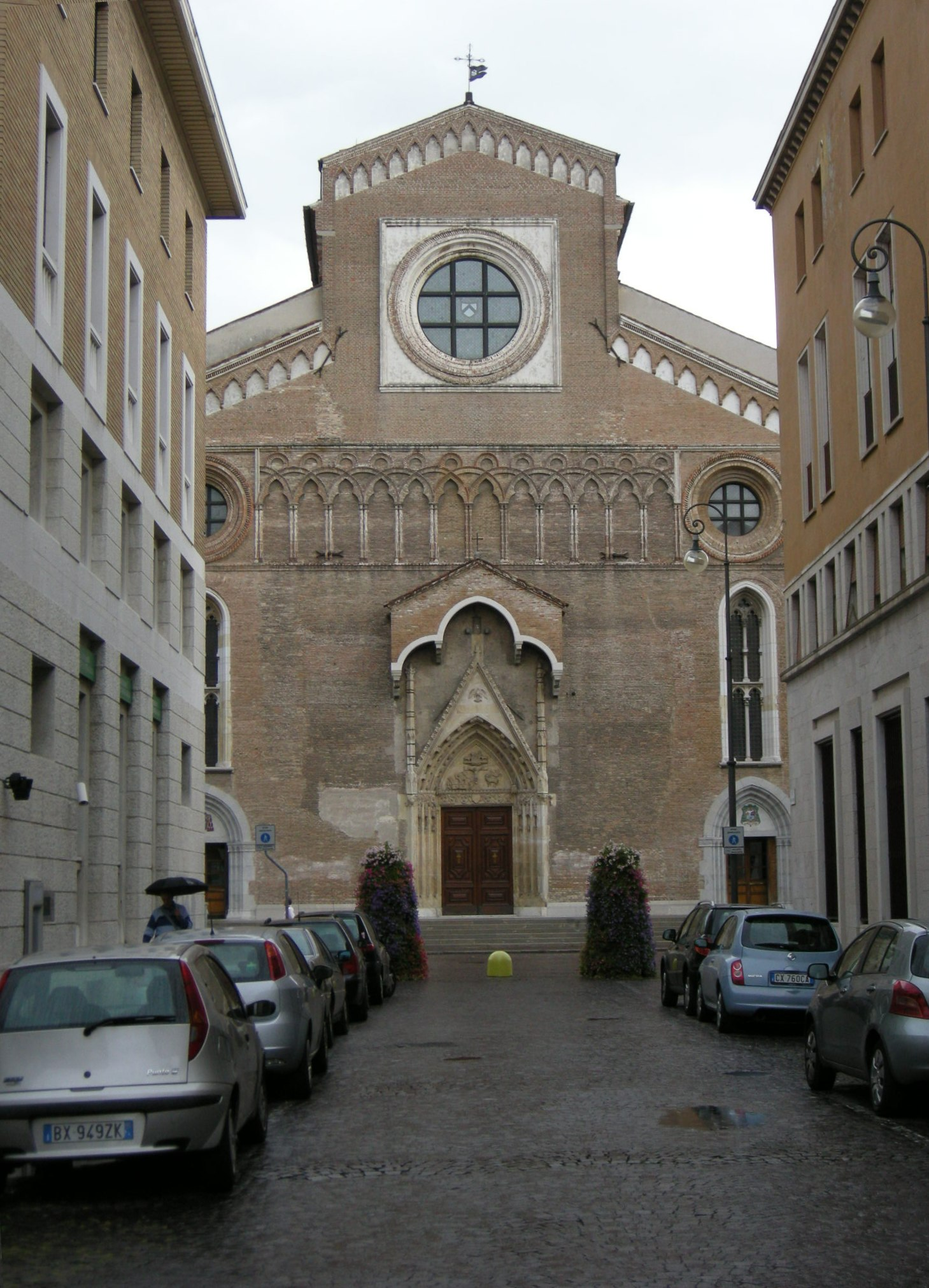
Facade of Udine Cathedral

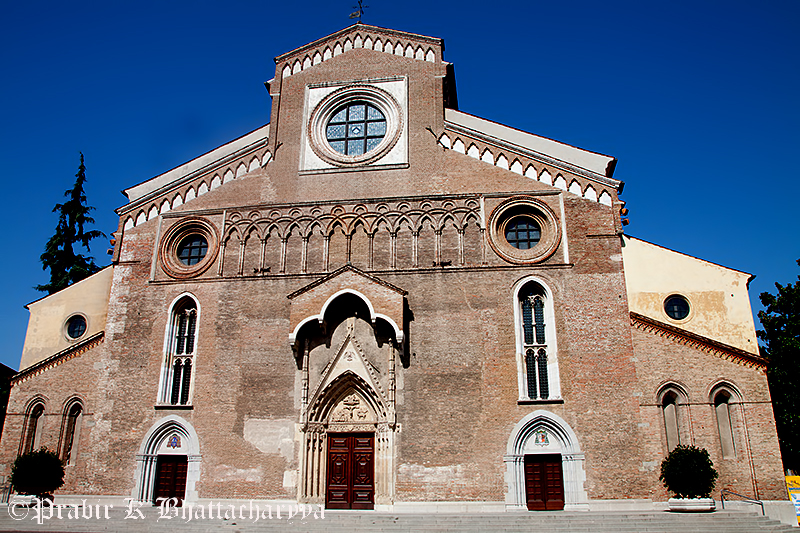
Udine Cathedral

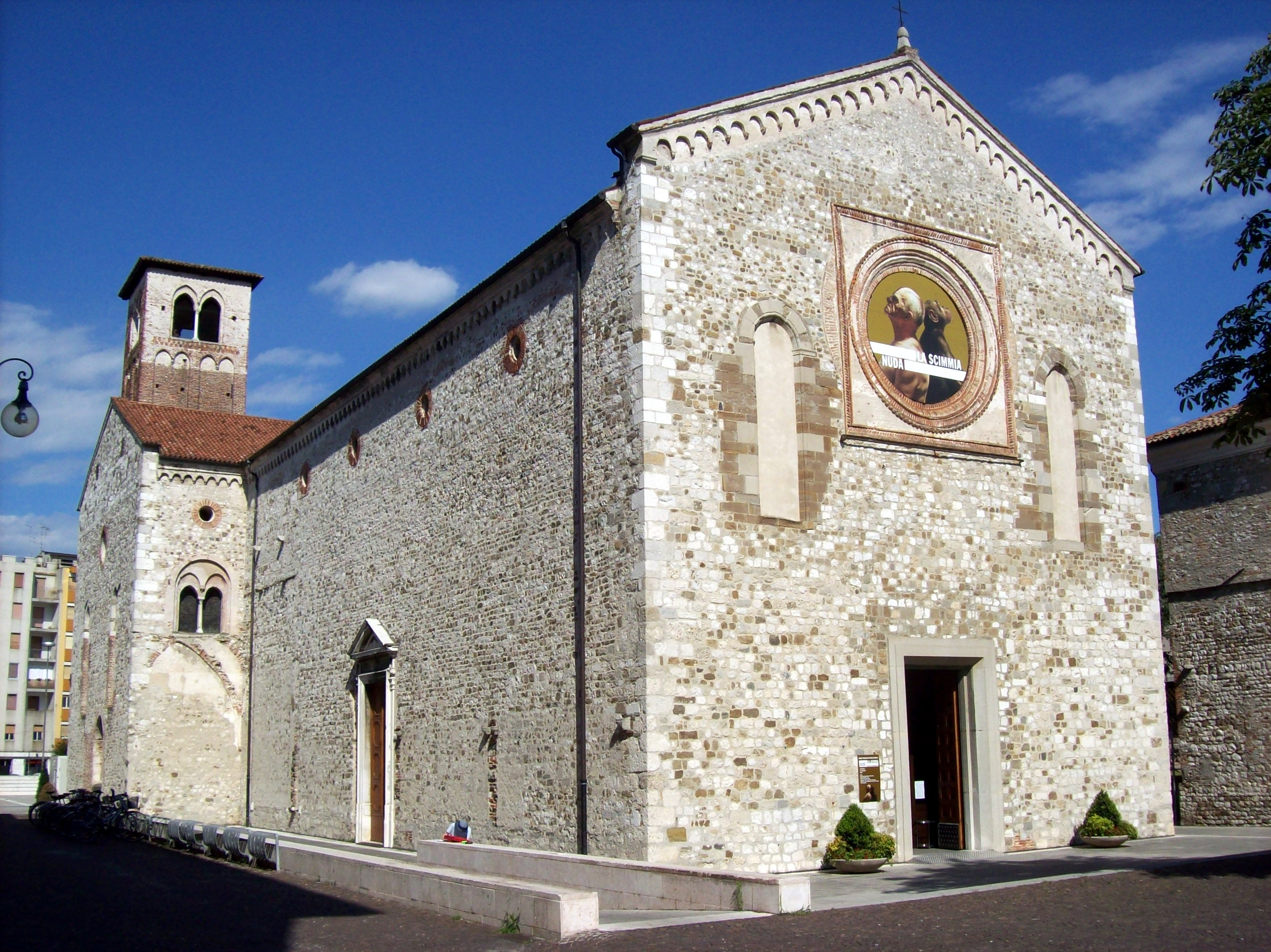
Chiesa di San Francesco

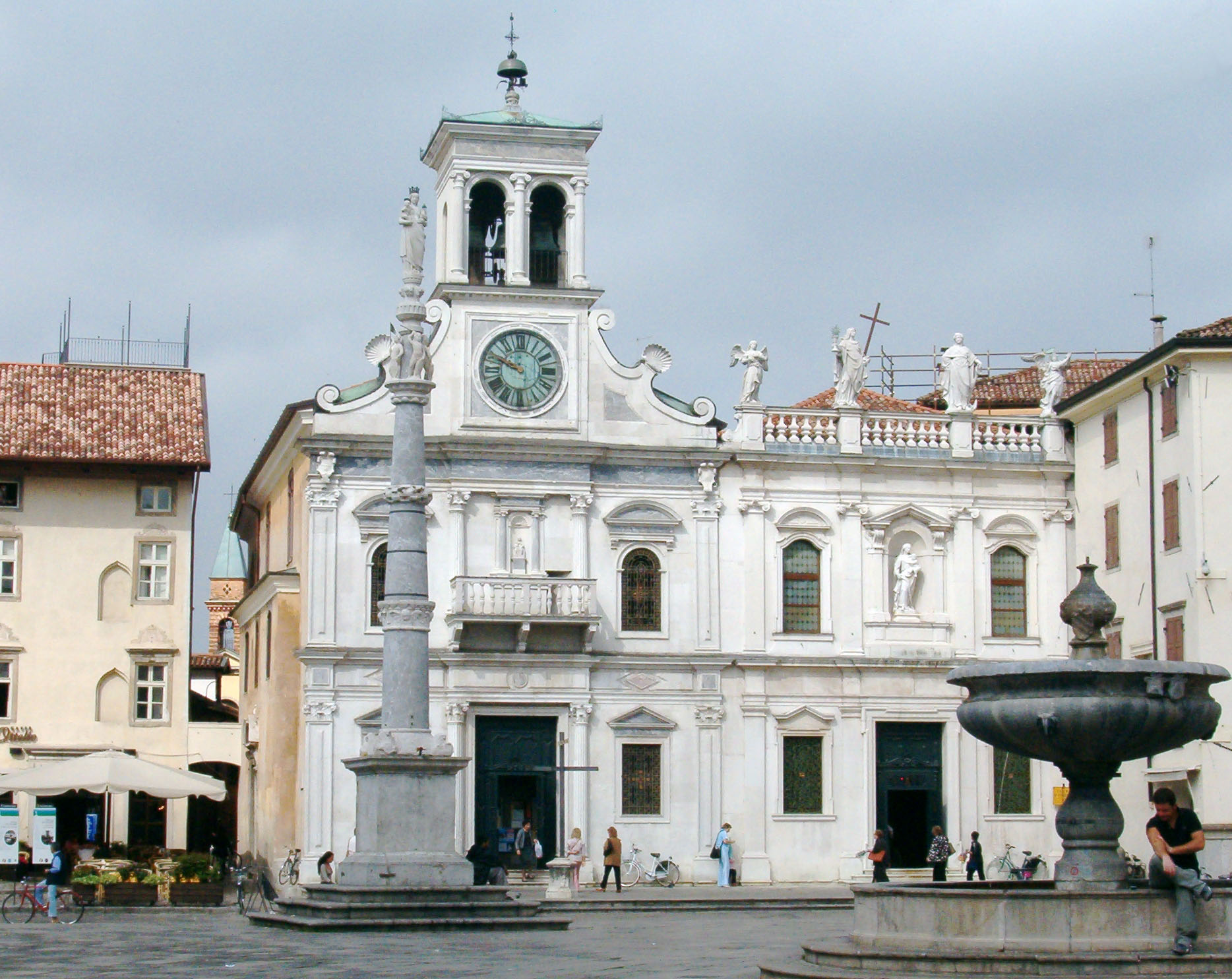
Piazza San Giacomo

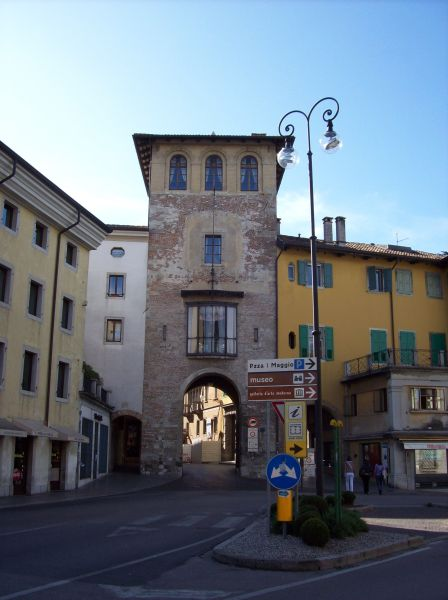
Porta Manin

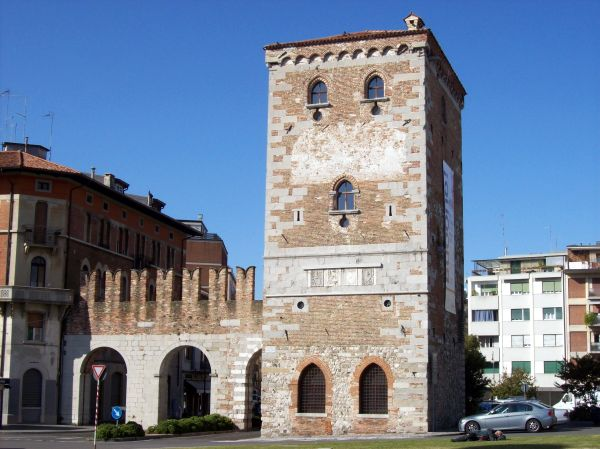
Porta Aquileia

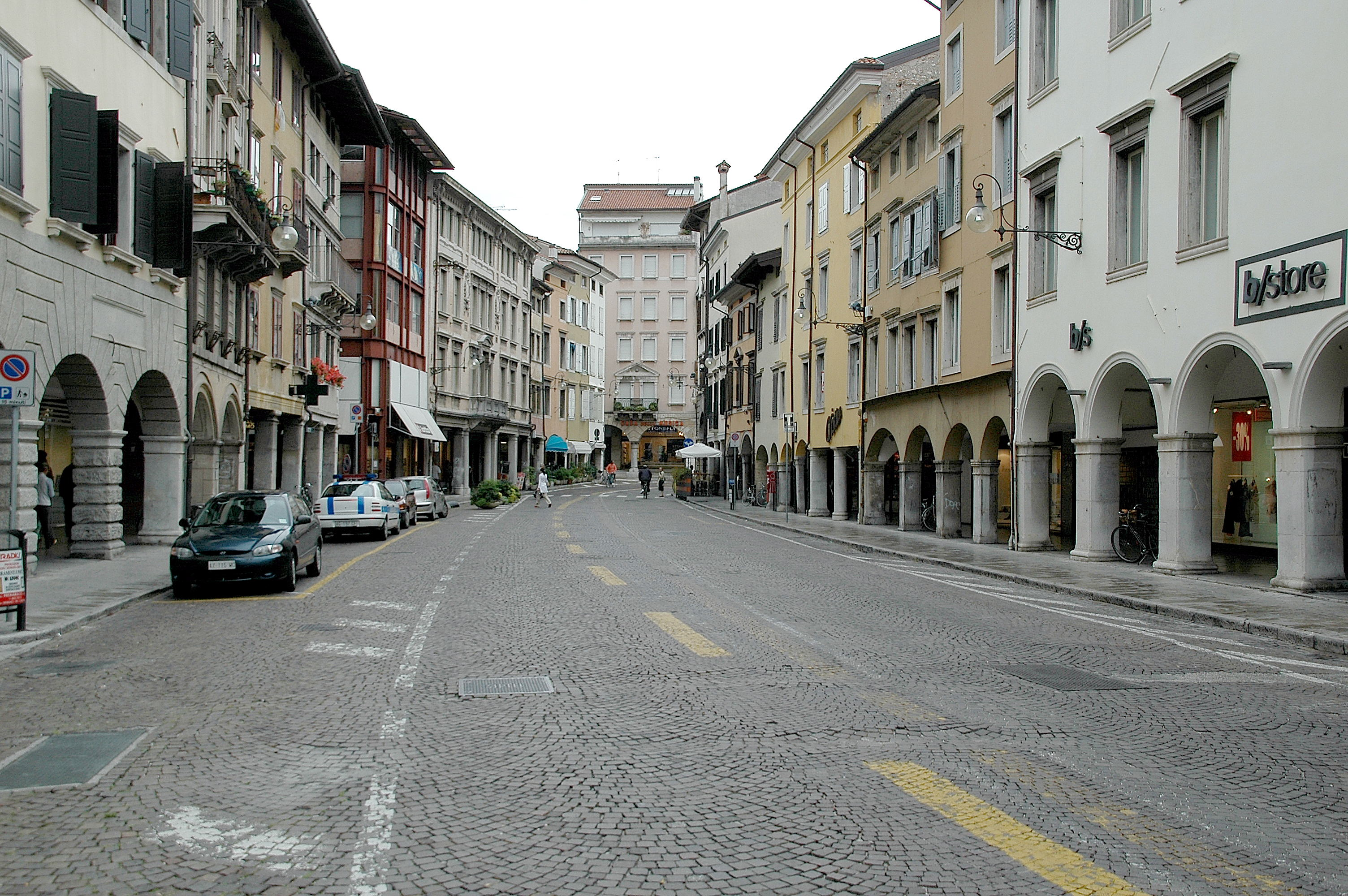
Via Mercatovecchio

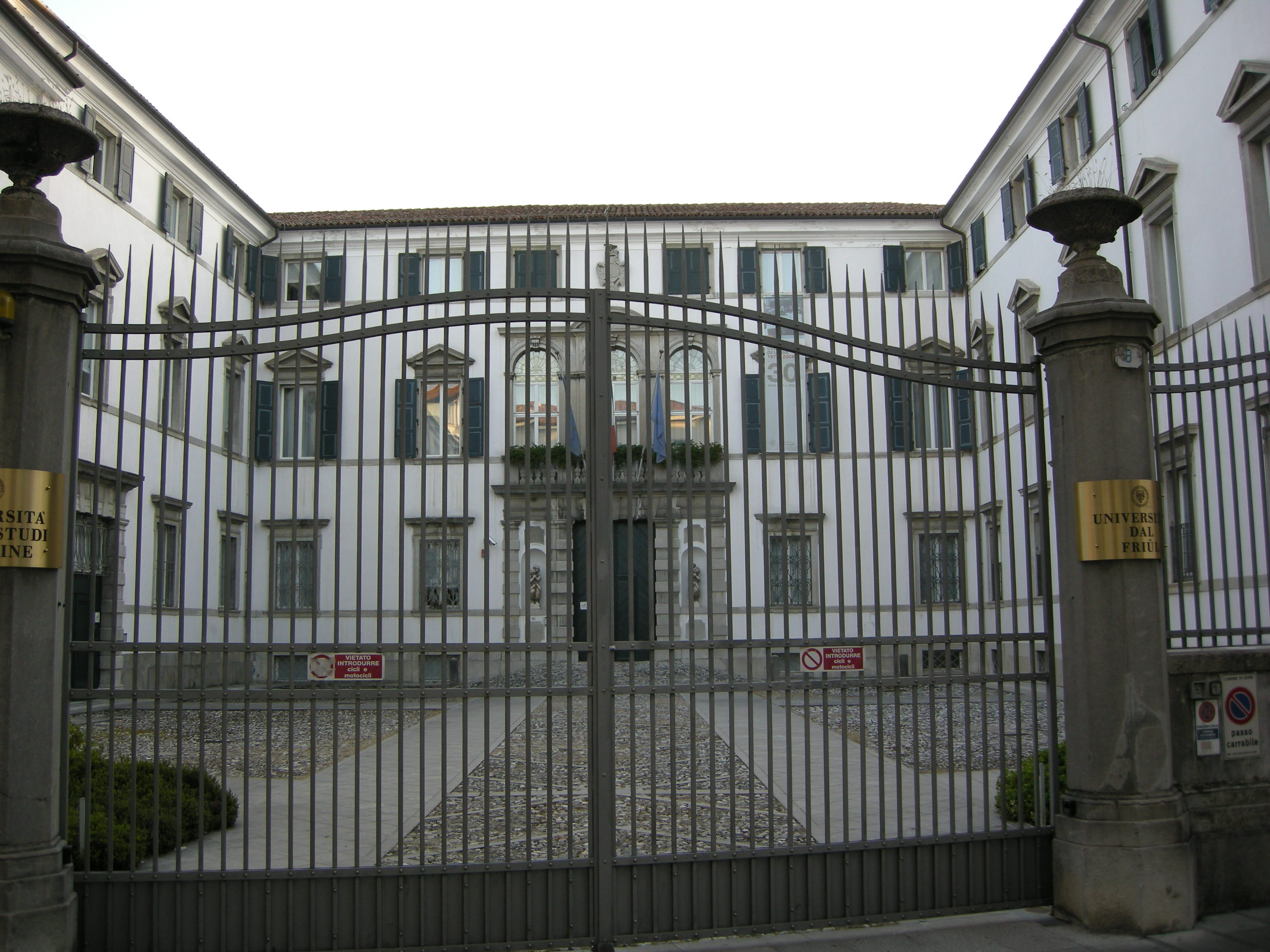
University of Udine

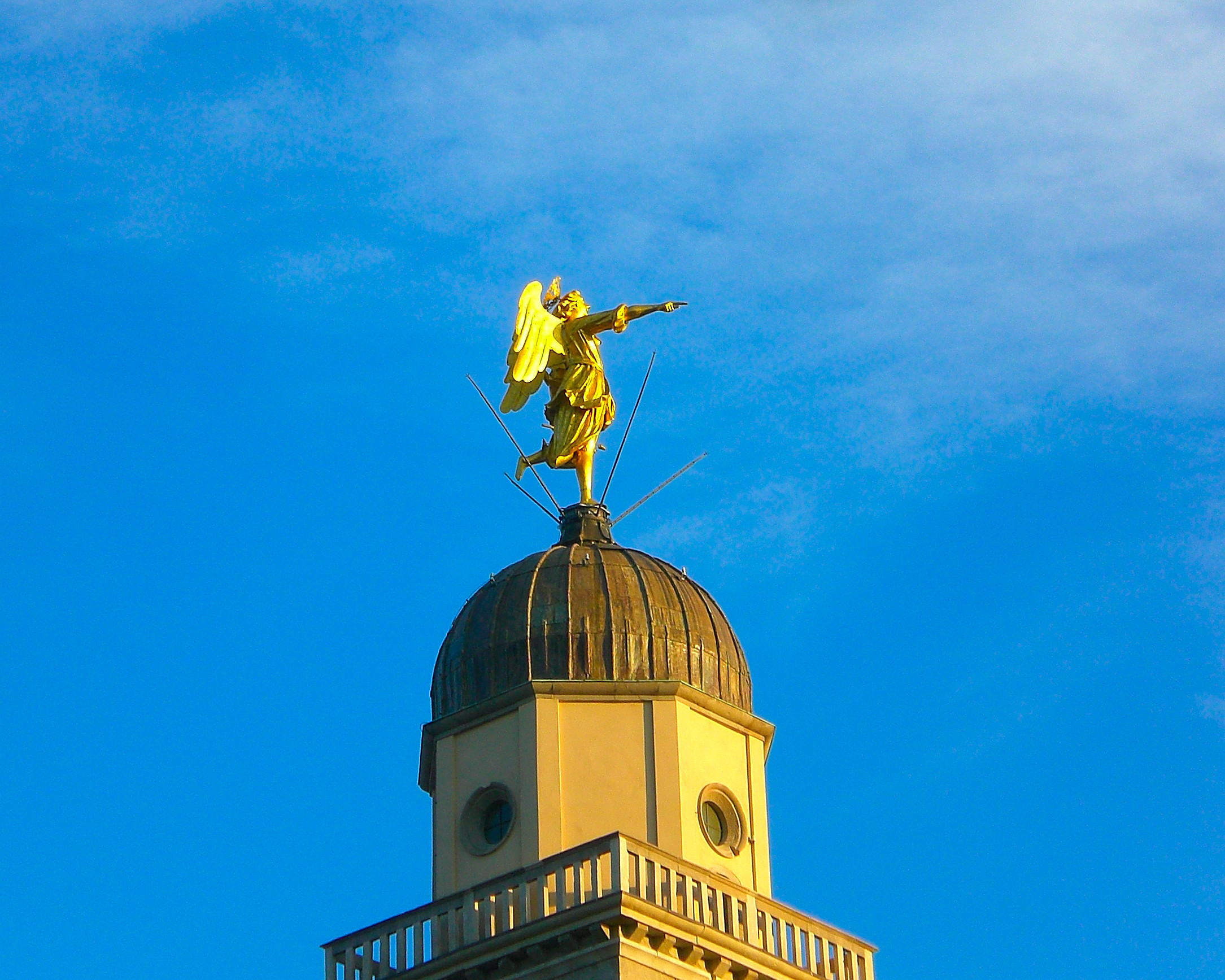
The Angel of the steeple of the Church of Santa Maria di Castello di Udine

== Culture ==
The archbishop's palace and the Museo Civico have quite important paintings. The city has a theater, the Teatro Giovanni da Udine.

Important festivals include the wine-and-food September festival, Friuli D.O.C., the national literary prize for non-fiction Premio Friuli Storia and the biggest European festival of popular East Asian cinema, the Far East Film Festival, in April.

Asteroid 33100 Udine was named in honour of the city.

Along with Italian, Friulian is often spoken in Udine, as well as a variant of Venetian (called Venetin) that is however in decline.

=== Museums ===
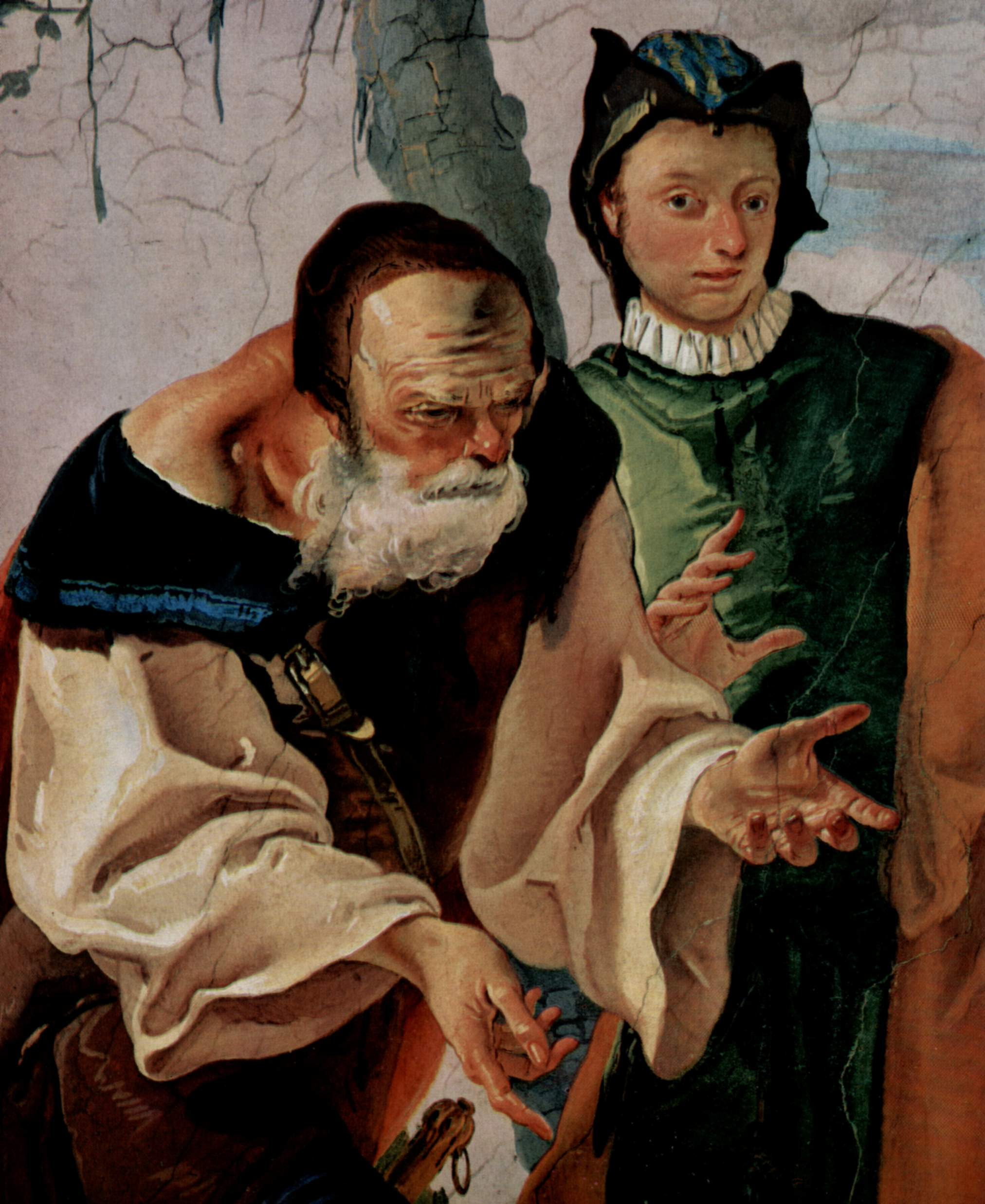
Museo Diocesano e Gallerie del Tiepolo, fresco, detail of Rachel sitting on the idols, Laban (older) and Jacob (younger)

- Civici musei e gallerie di storia e arte (since 1906) with Museo Archeologico, Galleria d'Arte Antica, Galleria dei Disegni e delle Stampa, Museo Friulano della Fotografia, Fototeca e Collezioni Risorgimentali
- Museo di Arte Moderna e Contemporanea
- Museo etnografico del Friuli (Palazzo Giacomelli)
- Gallerie del Progetto
- Museo del Duomo di Udine
- Museo diocesano e gallerie del Tiepolo

== Economy ==
Udine is important for commerce, with several commercial centers in the hinterland. There are also iron and mechanical industries (Danieli and ABS are the most important), ICOP, De Eccher.

== Education ==
Udine has a university, the University of Udine.

== Transport ==
With 7,600,000 travelling people every year, Udine railway station is the most important station in Friuli-Venezia Giulia. Train services operate to Venice, Treviso, Trieste, Gemona del Friuli, Tarvisio, Cividale del Friuli, Padua, Bologna, Rome, Verona and Milan. International trains operate to Vienna and Munich.

The nearest airport is Trieste Airport which is located approximately 44 km south of Udine.

== Sport ==
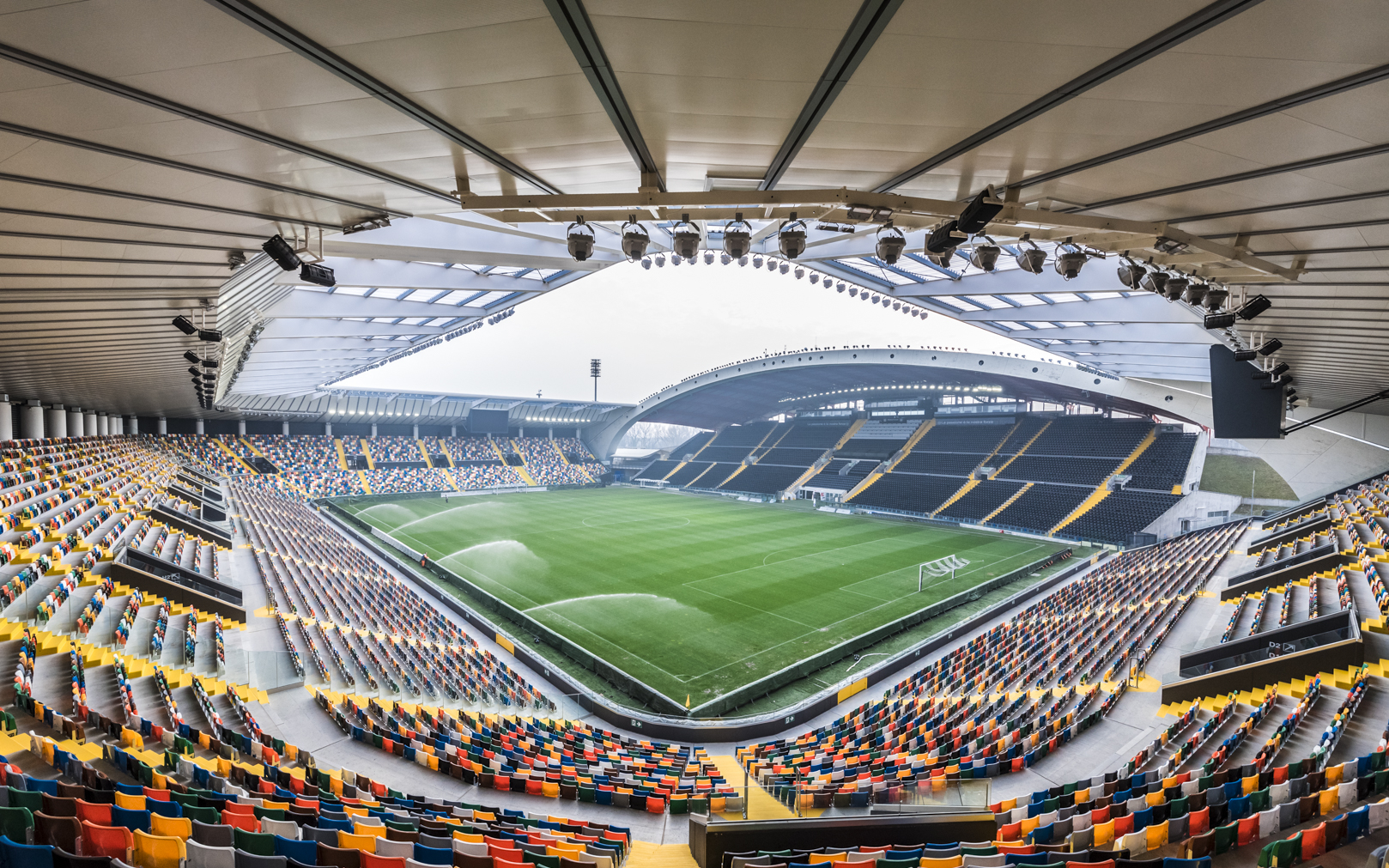
Serie A club Udinese Calcio play at the Stadio Friuli

The main football club in the city is Udinese Calcio, founded in 1896, who, as of 2023, have played in every Serie A season since the 1995–96 season. Their ground, the Stadio Friuli, was a venue at the 1990 FIFA World Cup and the 2025 UEFA Super Cup.

The local basketball team, APU Udine, played in the first national league, the Lega Basket Serie A.

The former Stadio Moretti hosted football and motorcycle speedway, it held significant events including qualifying rounds of the Speedway World Championship in 1971 and 1972.

== Notable people ==
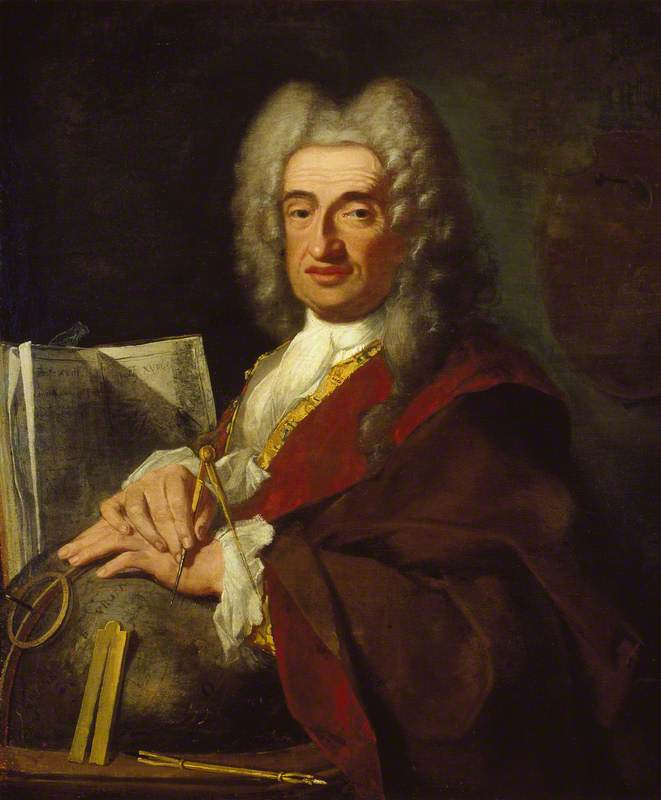
Luca Carlevarijs

- Luigi De Agostini (born 1961), footballer
- Guglielmo Vicario (born 1996), footballer
- Afro Basaldella (1912–1976), painter
- Giuseppe Battiston (born 1968), actor
- Enzo Bearzot (1927–2010), national football trainer
- Mario Benedetti (1955–2020), poet
- Girolamo di Bernardino, 16th-century painter of frescoes
- Bernardino Blaceo, 16th-century painter
- Emanuele Blandamura (born 1979), boxer
- Sebastiano Bombelli (1635–1719), Baroque and Rococò painter
- José Bragato (1915–2017), cellist and composer
- Carlo Caneva (1845–1922), major general
- Luca Cappellari (born 1963), racing driver
- Eliana Cargnelutti (born 1989), blues rock musician
- Luca Carlevarijs (1663–1730), painter
- Elena Cecchini (born 1992), cyclist
- Davide Cecotti (born 1973), professional football player
- Andrea Centazzo (born 1948), drummer and composer
- Bruno Chizzo (1916–1969), footballer
- Giovanni da Udine (1487–1564), painter (Renaissance)
- Raimondo D'Aronco (1857–1932), architect
- Mario David (1934–2005), football player and coach.
- Gualtiero Driussi (1920–1996), politician
- Terezija Dush (1845–1870) Venetian Slovene herder, servant, nanny, and Marian seeres
- Alfredo Foni (1911–1985), football player and coach.
- Fabio Frittelli (1966–2013), better known by his pseudonym Mo-Do, an Italian musician
- Massimo Giacomini (born 1939), former footballer and sports commentator
- Andrea Chiopris Gori (born 1977), former footballer
- Francesco Janich (1937–2019), footballer
- Dalila Di Lazzaro (born 1953), actress and model
- Ernesto Lomasti (1959–1979), mountaineer
- Guido Macor (born 1932), retired footballer
- Fabio Masotti (born 1974), cyclist
- Alberto Mazzucato (1813–1877), composer and music teacher
- Tina Modotti (1896–1942), photographer, actress, revolutionary
- Edi Orioli (born 1962), rallying motorcycle racer
- Francesco Pavona (1695–1777), Baroque painter
- Daniele Petri (born 1980), Italian darts player
- Nicola Pezzetta (born 1963), artist and architect
- Luigi Pio Tessitori (1887–1919), indologist, linguist
- Alessandro Piu (born 1996), footballer
- Bruno Pizzul (1938–2025), sports journalist and footballer
- Bruno Sacco (born 1933), car designer
- Alessia Tuttino (born 1983), footballer
- Elena Valentinis (1396–1458), Roman Catholic Blessed professed religious
- Glauco Venier (born 1962), jazz pianist and composer
- Francesco Renga (born 1968), singer-songwriter
- Giuseppe Virgili (1935–2016), Italian footballer (striker)
- José Zanier (1905–1973), engineer
- Alessandro Zanni (born 1984), rugby union player
- Sergio Peresson (1913–1991), luthier

== International relations ==
=== Twin towns – sister cities ===
Udine is twinned with:

- Albacete, Spain
- Esslingen am Neckar, Germany
- Maribor, Slovenia
- Neath Port Talbot, Wales, United Kingdom
- Schiedam, Netherlands
- Vienne, France
- Villach, Austria
- Windsor, Canada
- Yaoundé, Cameroon
- Tarnów, Poland

=== Friendship ===
- Bikaner, India
- Klagenfurt, Austria
- Óbuda-Békásmegyer, Hungary
- Piotrków Trybunalski, Poland
- Resistencia, Argentina
- Velenje, Slovenia

== See also ==
- Friuli innovazione
