= Domodossola (Milan Metro) =

Milan metro station

Domodossola FN
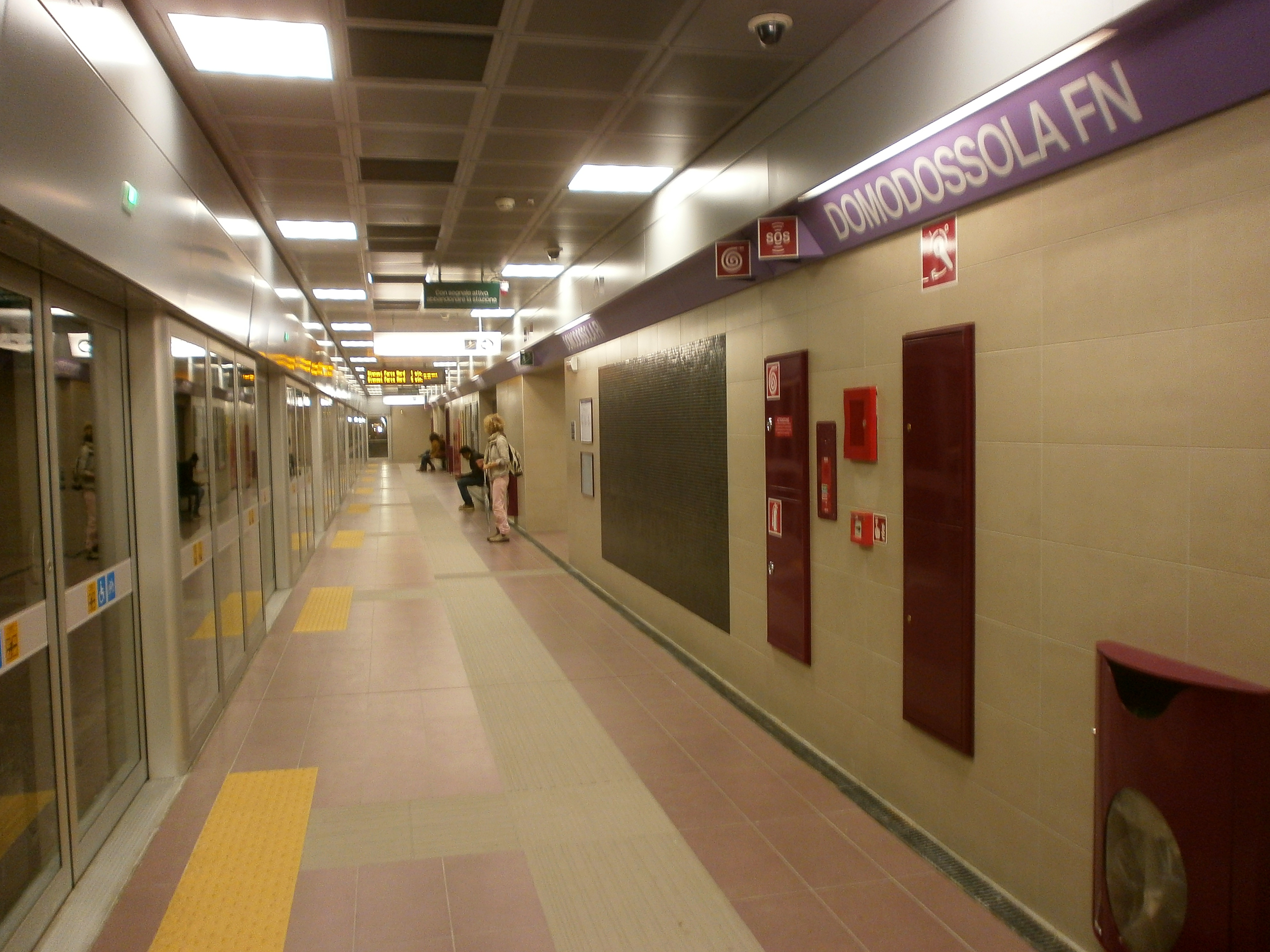

General information
- Coordinates: 45.285381°N 9.094416°E
- Owner: Azienda Trasporti Milanesi
- Platforms: 1
- Tracks: 2
- Connections: Milano Domodossola railway station

Construction
- Structure type: Underground
- Accessible: yes

Other information
- Fare zone: STIBM: Mi1

History
- Opened: 29 April 2015; 11 years ago

Services
Preceding station	Milan Metro	Following station
Gerusalemme towards Bignami	Line 5	Tre Torri towards San Siro Stadio
Location

Domodossola FN is a station on Line 5 of the Milan Metro which opened on 29 April 2015.

== History ==
The construction of the station began in July 2011, as part of the second section of the line, from Garibaldi FS to San Siro Stadio. It was opened to the public on 29 April 2015, a few days before the official opening of Expo 2015.

== Station structure ==
Domodossola is an underground station with two tracks served by an island platform and like all the other stations on Line 5, is wheelchair accessible.

The station allows interchange with Milano Domodossola railway station, part of the suburban railway service, even though there is no direct link. It is necessary to leave the Metro station before entering the railway station. The outdoor path is covered by a glass canopy.

== Interchanges ==
Near this station are located:

- Milano Domodossola railway station
- Tram stops (Domodossola FN M5, lines 1 and 19)
- Bus stops
