= Cenisio (Milan Metro) =

Milan metro station

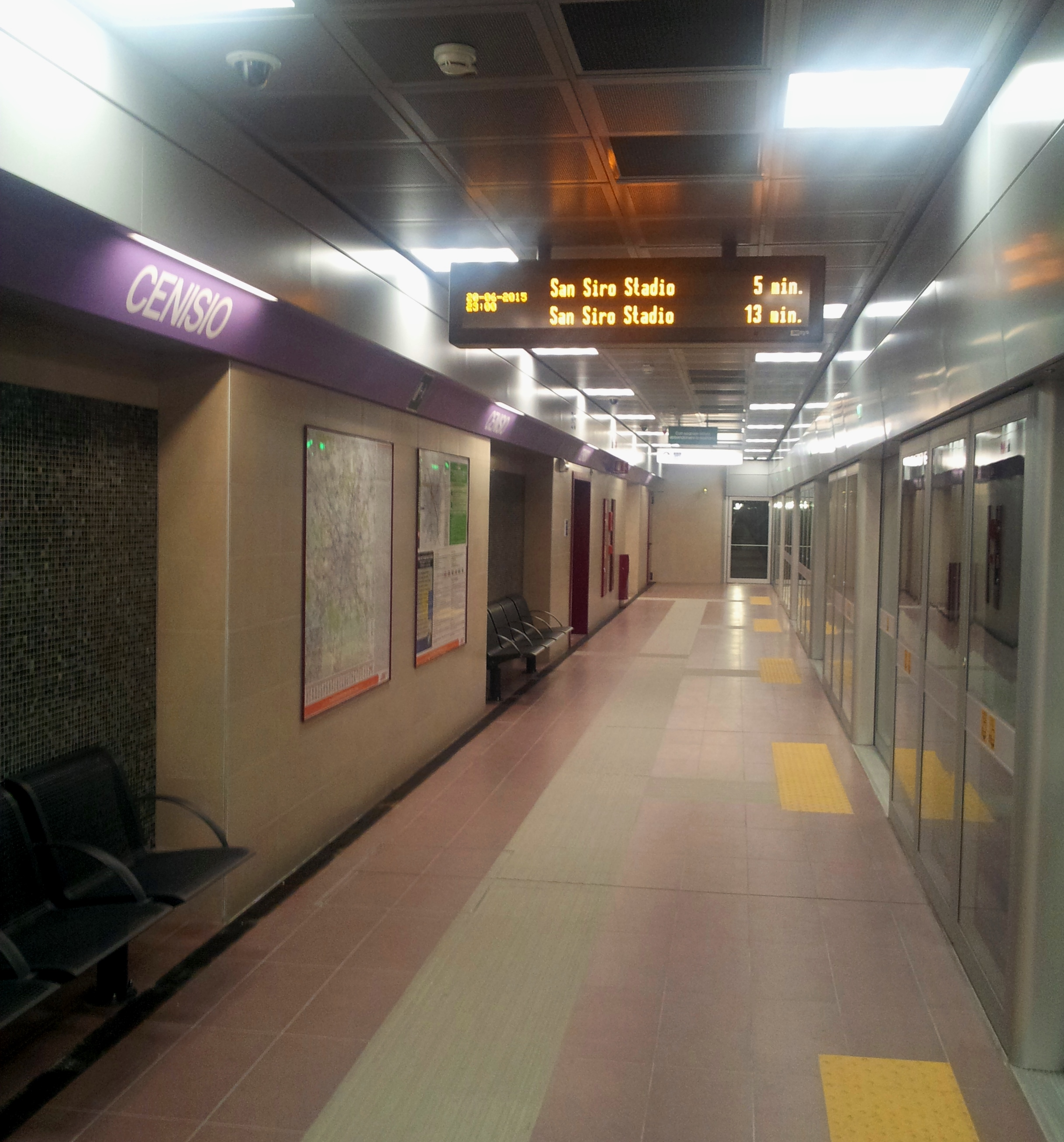

General information
- Coordinates: 45.291409°N 9.102231°E
- Owner: Azienda Trasporti Milanesi
- Platforms: 1
- Tracks: 2

Construction
- Structure type: Underground
- Accessible: yes

Other information
- Fare zone: STIBM: Mi1

History
- Opened: 20 June 2015; 11 years ago

Services
Preceding station	Milan Metro	Following station
Monumentale towards Bignami	Line 5	Gerusalemme towards San Siro Stadio
Location

Cenisio is a station on Line 5 of the Milan Metro.

== History ==
The works for the construction of the station began in July 2011, as part of the second section of the line, from Garibaldi FS to San Siro Stadio. It was opened to the public on 20 June 2015, nearly two months after the opening of this section of the line, and five months earlier than scheduled.

== Station structure ==
Cenisio is an underground station with two tracks served by one island platform and, like all the other stations on Line 5, is wheelchair accessible.

== Interchanges ==
Near this station are located:

- Tram stops (lines 12 and 14)
