= Gerusalemme (Milan Metro) =

Milan Metro station

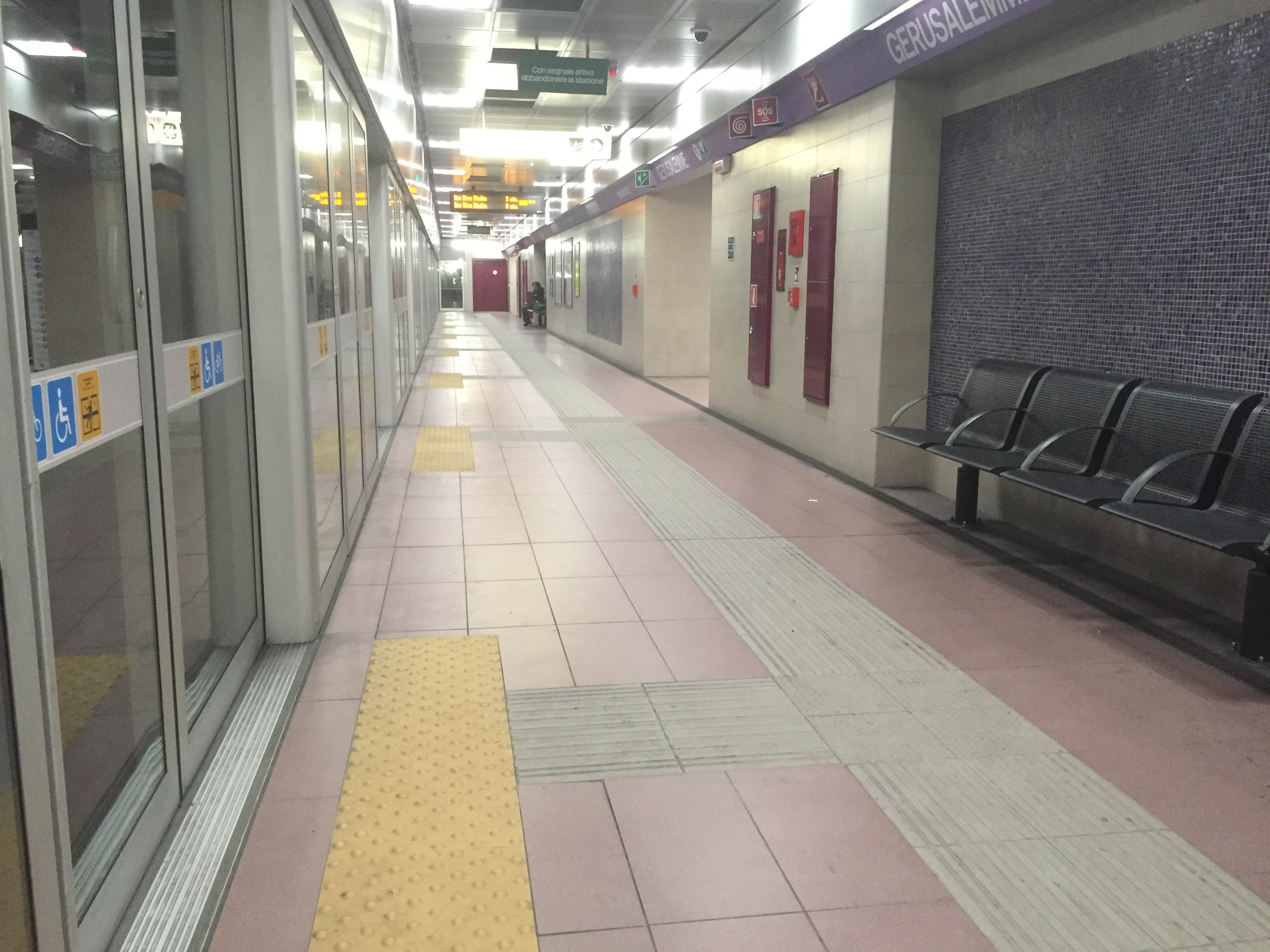

General information
- Location: Gerusalemme 20154 Milan, Metropolitan City of Milan, Italy
- Coordinates: 45.4847752°N 9.1669901°E
- System: Metropolitana Milano Linea 5
- Owner: Azienda Trasporti Milanesi
- Platforms: 1
- Tracks: 2

Construction
- Structure type: Underground
- Accessible: yes

Other information
- Fare zone: STIBM: Mi1

History
- Opened: 26 September 2015; 10 years ago

Services
Preceding station	Milan Metro	Following station
Cenisio towards Bignami	Line 5	Domodossola towards San Siro Stadio
Location

Gerusalemme is a station on Line 5 of the Milan Metro which opened on 26 September 2015.

== History ==
The works for the construction of the station began in 2010, as part of the second section of the line, from Garibaldi FS to San Siro Stadio. It opened on 26 September 2015.

== Station structure ==
Gerusalemme is an underground station with two tracks served by an island platform and, like all the other stations on Line 5, is wheelchair accessible.
