= Tre Torri (Milan Metro) =

Milan metro station

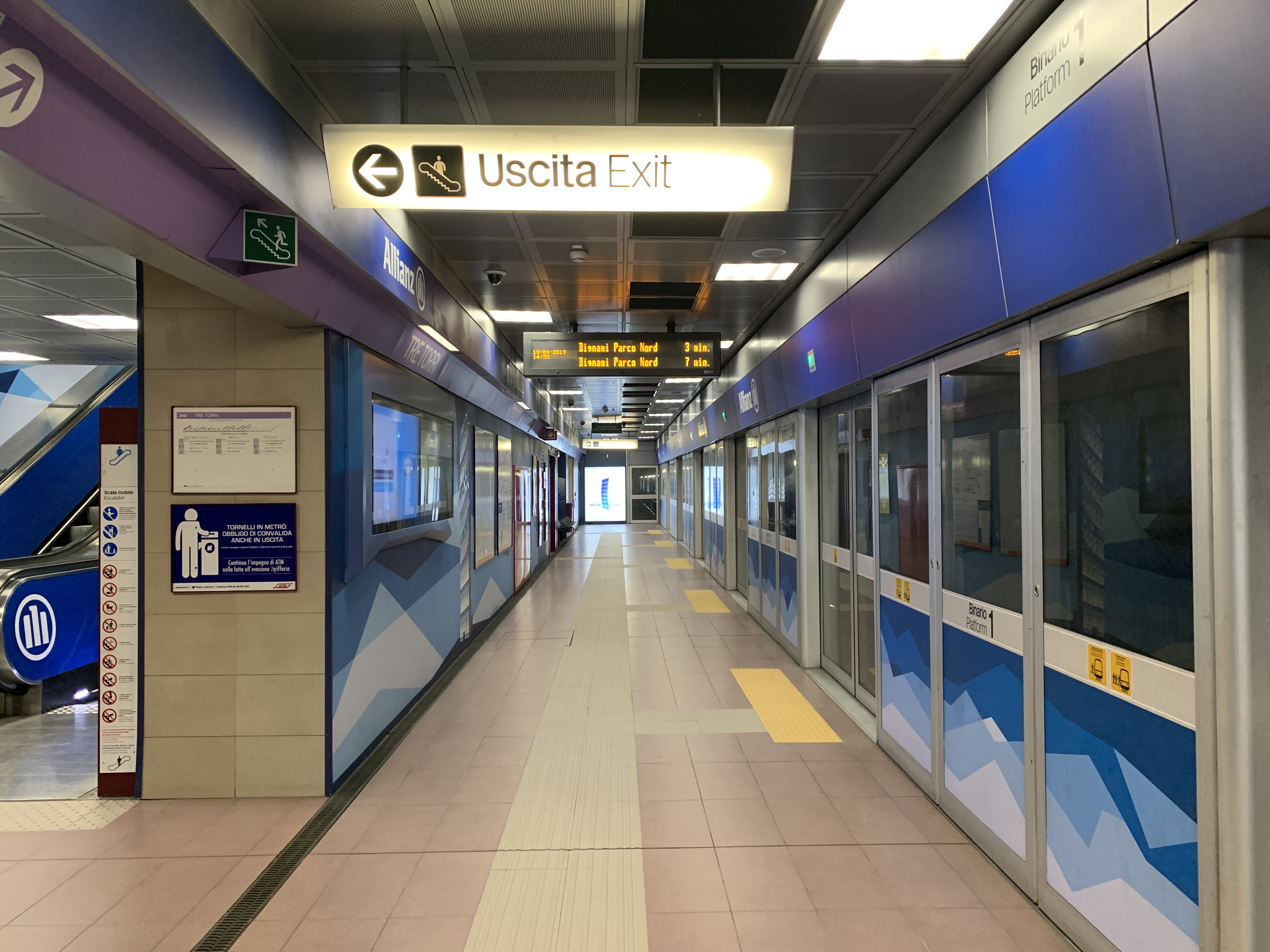

General information
- Coordinates: 45.283108°N 9.090652°E
- Owner: Azienda Trasporti Milanesi
- Platforms: 1
- Tracks: 2

Construction
- Structure type: Underground
- Accessible: yes

Other information
- Fare zone: STIBM: Mi1

History
- Opened: 14 November 2015; 10 years ago

Services
Preceding station	Milan Metro	Following station
Domodossola towards Bignami	Line 5	Portello towards San Siro Stadio
Location

Tre Torri is a station on Line 5 of the Milan Metro which opened on November 14, 2015.

== History ==
The works for the construction of the station began in July 2011, as part of the second section of the line, from Garibaldi FS to San Siro Stadio. It was opened to the public on 14 November 2015, the last station of Line 5 to be opened.

== Station structure ==
Tre Torri is an underground station with two tracks served by an island platform and like all the other stations on Line 5, is wheelchair-accessible.

It is situated within the CityLife district, surrounded by the three towers (Hadid Tower or "The Twisted"; Libeskind Tower or "The Bent"; and the Isozaki Tower or "The Straight").
