= Portello (Milan Metro) =

Milan metro station

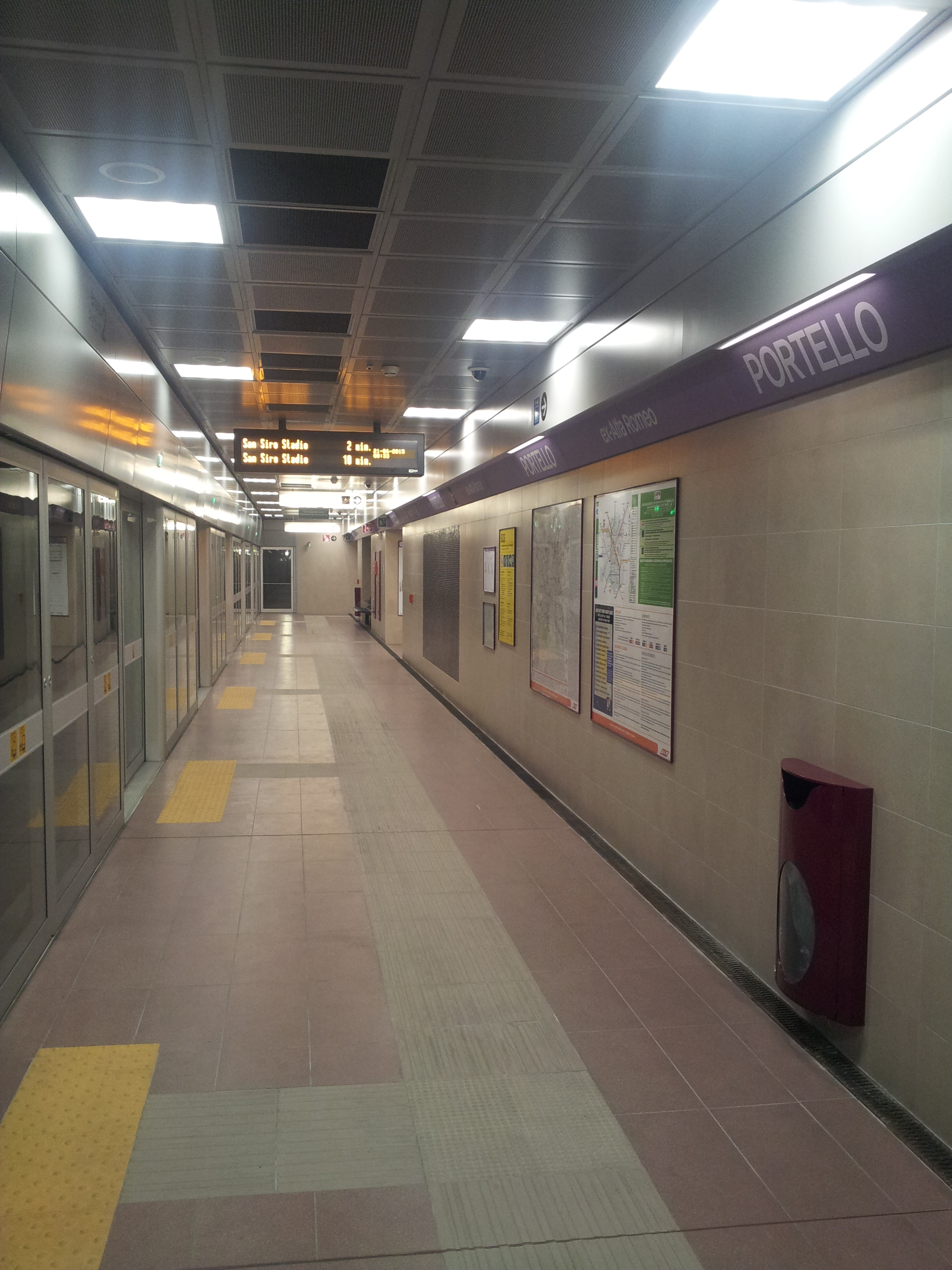

General information
- Coordinates: 45.481412°N 9.150461°E
- Owner: Azienda Trasporti Milanesi
- Platforms: 1
- Tracks: 2

Construction
- Structure type: Underground
- Accessible: yes

Other information
- Fare zone: STIBM: Mi1

History
- Opened: 6 June 2015; 11 years ago

Services
Preceding station	Milan Metro	Following station
Tre Torri towards Bignami	Line 5	Lotto towards San Siro Stadio
Location

Portello is a station on Line 5 of the Milan Metro which opened on 6 June 2015.

== History ==
The works for the construction of the station began in July 2011, as part of the second section of the line, from Garibaldi FS to San Siro Stadio. It was opened to the public on 6 June 2015, one month after the opening of this section of the line.

== Station structure ==
Portello is an underground station with two tracks served by an island platform and like all the other stations on Line 5, is wheelchair accessible.

It is situated near Fieramilanocity, the urban headquarters of Fiera Milano, and the MiCo congress centre and the Citylife project.

== Interchanges ==
Near this station are located:

- Bus stop lines 47 and 78
