= Marche (Milan Metro) =

Milan metro station

Coordinates: 45.4964°N 9.1953°E

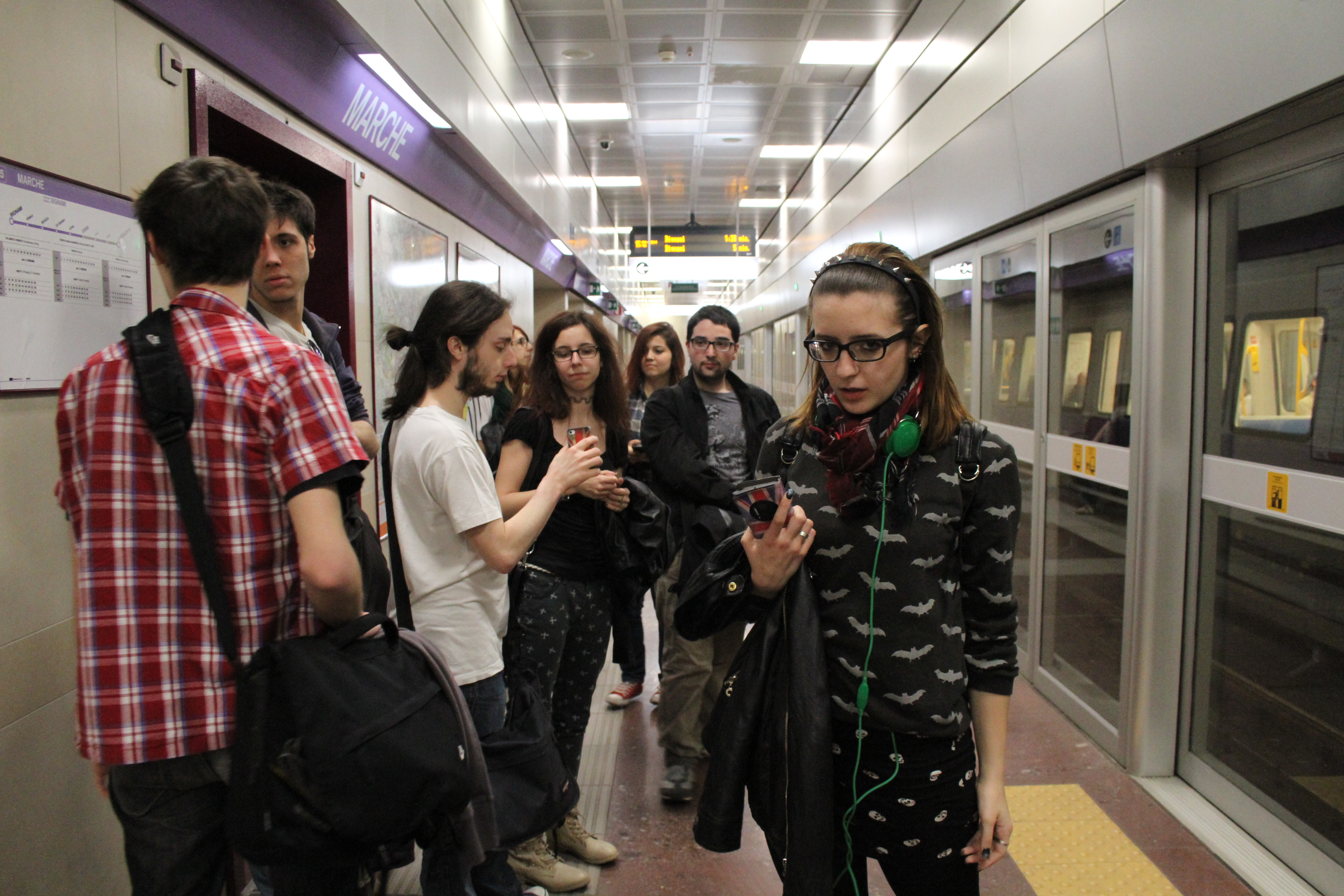

General information
- Owner: Azienda Trasporti Milanesi
- Platforms: 2
- Tracks: 2

Construction
- Structure type: Underground
- Accessible: yes

Other information
- Fare zone: STIBM: Mi1

History
- Opened: 10 February 2013; 13 years ago

Services
Preceding station	Milan Metro	Following station
Istria towards Bignami	Line 5	Zara towards San Siro Stadio
Location

Marche is a station on Line 5 of the Milan Metro.

== History ==
The works for the construction of the first section of Line 5, which includes Marche station, began in September 2007, and it was opened on 10 February 2013.

== Station structure ==
Marche is an underground station with two tracks in one tunnel and, like all the other stations on Line 5, is wheelchair accessible.

It is located at the intersection of Viale Zara and Viale Marche, but has exits only to Viale Zara.

== Interchanges ==
Tram lines 5 and 7 stop near the station.
