= Segesta (Milan Metro) =

Milan metro station

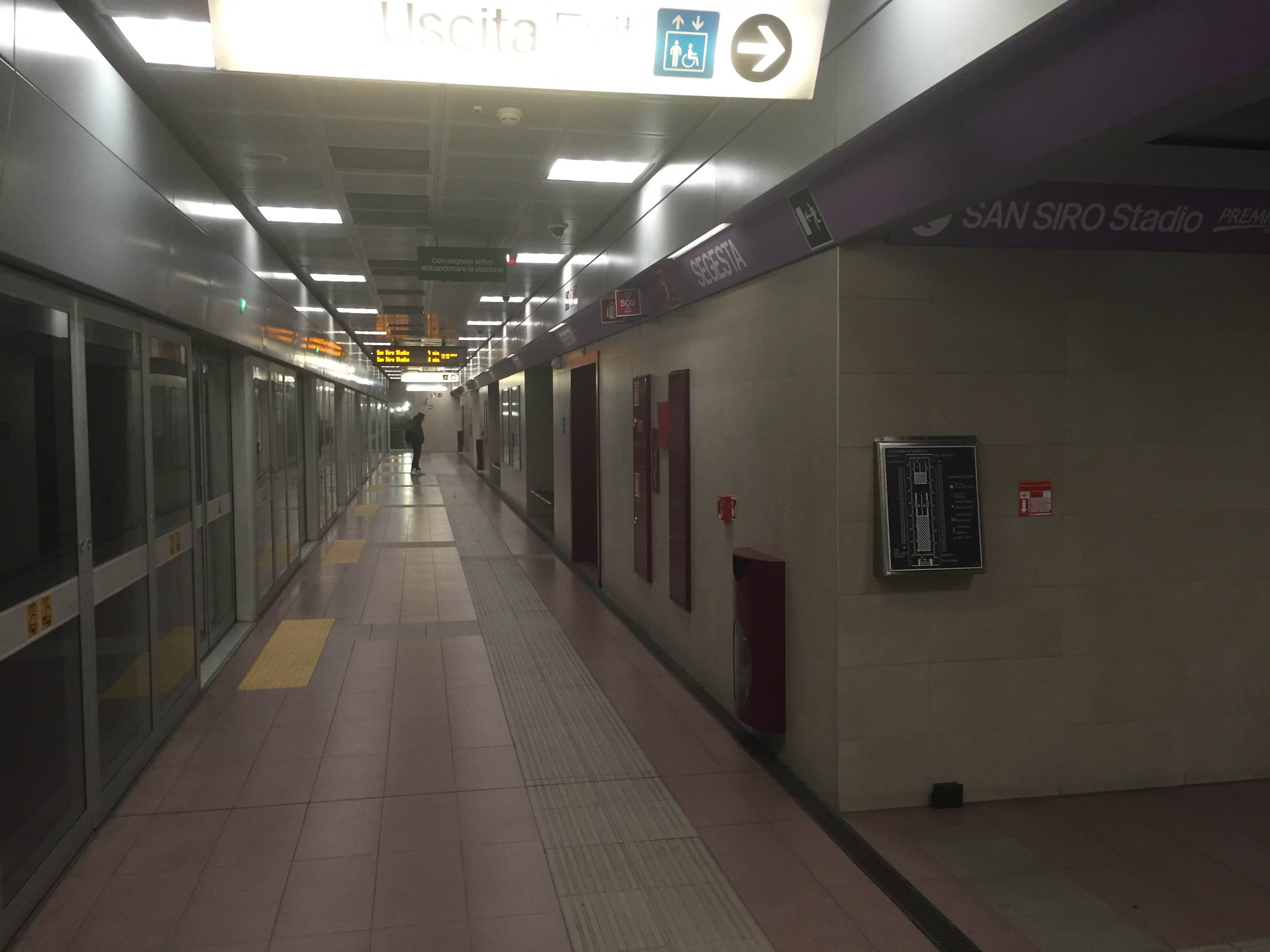

General information
- Coordinates: 45.476217°N 9.137345°E
- Owner: Azienda Trasporti Milanesi
- Platforms: 1
- Tracks: 2

Construction
- Structure type: Underground
- Accessible: yes

Other information
- Fare zone: STIBM: Mi1

History
- Opened: 29 April 2015; 11 years ago

Services
| Preceding station | Milan Metro | Following station |
|---|---|---|
| Lotto towards Bignami | Line 5 | San Siro Ippodromo towards San Siro Stadio |
Location

Segesta is a station on Line 5 of the Milan Metro.

== History ==
The works for the construction of the station began in November 2010, as part of the second section of the line, from Garibaldi FS to San Siro Stadio. The station was opened to the public on 29 April 2015, a few days before the official opening of Expo 2015.

== Station structure ==
Segesta is an underground station with two tracks served by an island platform and, like all the other stations on Line 5, is wheelchair accessible.

For the construction of this station, a special construction method, called Massive Milan, was used to reduce train vibrations.

== Interchanges ==
Near this station are located:

- Tram stops (line 16)
- Bus stops
