= Ca' Granda (Milan Metro) =

Milan metro station

Coordinates: 45.5072°N 9.2011°E

Ca’ Granda - Pratocentenaro
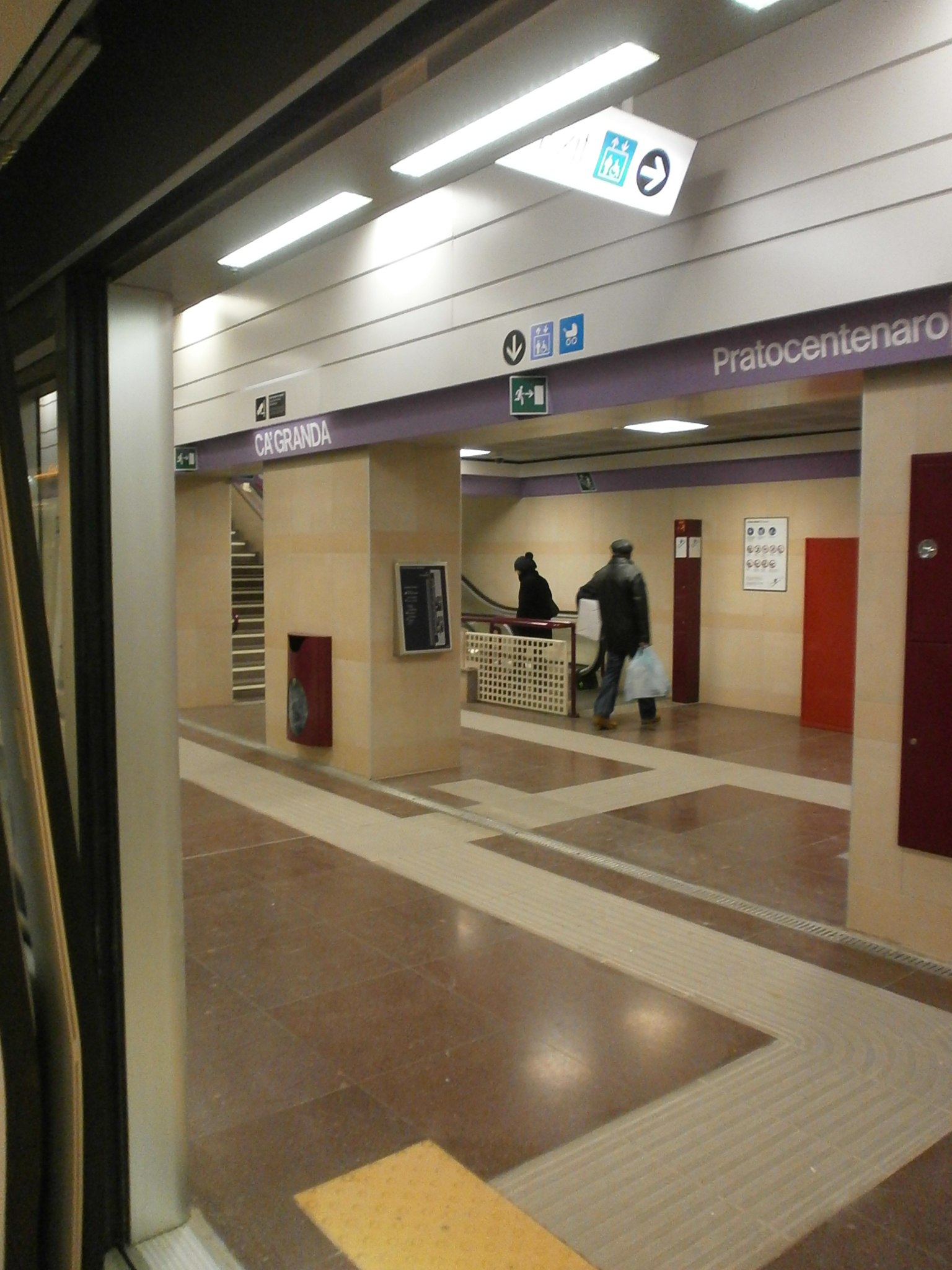

General information
- Owner: Azienda Trasporti Milanesi
- Platforms: 2
- Tracks: 2

Construction
- Structure type: Underground
- Accessible: yes

Other information
- Fare zone: STIBM: Mi1

History
- Opened: 10 February 2013; 13 years ago

Services
Preceding station	Milan Metro	Following station
Bicocca towards Bignami	Line 5	Istria towards San Siro Stadio
Location

Ca’ Granda-Pratocentenaro is a station on Line 5 of the Milan Metro.

== History ==
The works for the construction of the first section of Line 5, which includes Ca' Granda station, began in September 2007, and it was opened on 10 February 2013.

== Station structure ==
Ca’ Granda-Pratocentenaro is an underground station with two tracks in one tunnel and, like all the other stations on Line 5, is wheelchair accessible.

It is located at the intersection of Viale Fulvio Testi and Viale Ca' Granda, and also has exits to Via Giuseppe Vidali.

== Interchanges ==
Tram lines 5 and 7 and bus stops are located near the station.
