= Monumentale (Milan Metro) =

Milan metro station

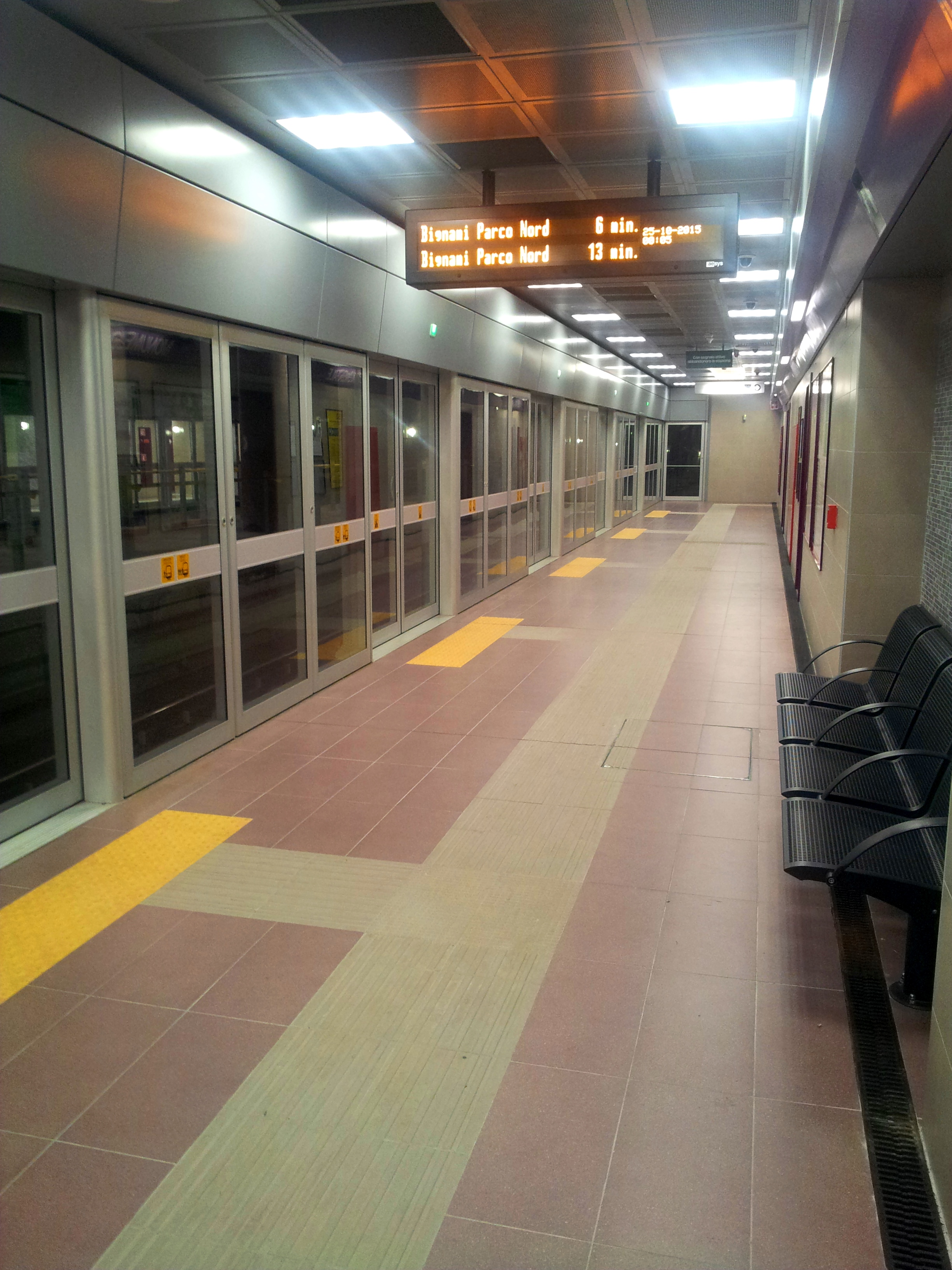

General information
- Coordinates: 45.4852°N 9.17877°E
- Owner: Azienda Trasporti Milanesi
- Platforms: 2
- Tracks: 2

Construction
- Structure type: Underground
- Accessible: yes

Other information
- Fare zone: STIBM: Mi1

History
- Opened: 11 October 2015; 10 years ago

Services
Preceding station	Milan Metro	Following station
Garibaldi FS towards Bignami	Line 5	Cenisio towards San Siro Stadio
Location

Monumentale is a station on Line 5 of the Milan Metro.

== History ==
The works for the construction of the station began in 2010, as part of the second section of the line, from Garibaldi FS to San Siro Stadio. The station was opened on 11 October 2015.

Monumentale is one of the stations where a tunnel boring machine was used to build the galleries.

== Station structure ==
Monumentale is an underground station with two tracks served by two side platforms and, like all the other stations on Line 5, is wheelchair accessible.

== Interchanges ==
Near this station are located:

- Tram stops (lines 2, 4, 10, 12, 14 and 33)
