= Isola (Milan Metro) =

Milan metro station

Coordinates: 45.4872°N 9.1911°E

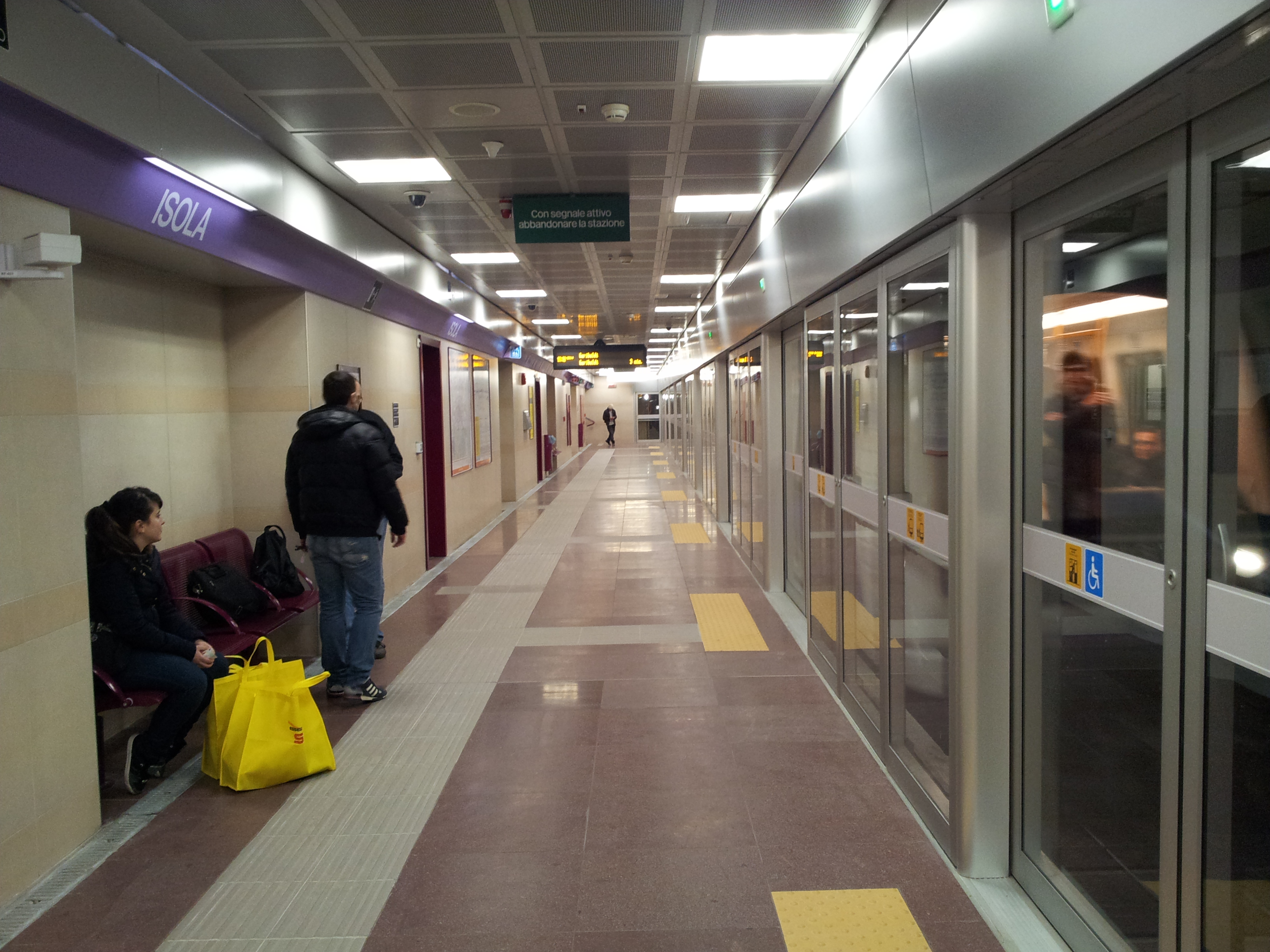

General information
- Owner: Azienda Trasporti Milanesi
- Platforms: 2
- Tracks: 2

Construction
- Structure type: Underground
- Accessible: yes

Other information
- Fare zone: STIBM: Mi1

History
- Opened: 1 March 2014; 12 years ago

Services
Preceding station	Milan Metro	Following station
Zara towards Bignami	Line 5	Garibaldi FS towards San Siro Stadio
Location

Isola is a station on Line 5 of the Milan Metro. It takes its name from the Isola (island) district of Milan in which it is located, its name derived from the neighbourhood's position cut off from the city centre by the main railway.

== History ==
The works for the construction of the first section of Line 5, which includes Isola station, began in September 2007, and it was opened on 1 March 2014 as part of the extension to Garibaldi FS.

== Station structure ==
Isola is an underground station with two tracks in one tunnel and, like all the other stations on Line 5, is wheelchair accessible.

It is located on Via Volturno, at the intersection with Via Sebenico, and has exits only to Via Volturno.

== Interchanges ==
Near this station are located:

- Tram stop (Piazzale Lagosta, lines 7 and 33)
- Bus stop
