= Ponale (Milan Metro) =

Milan metro station

Coordinates: 45.5219°N 9.2092°E

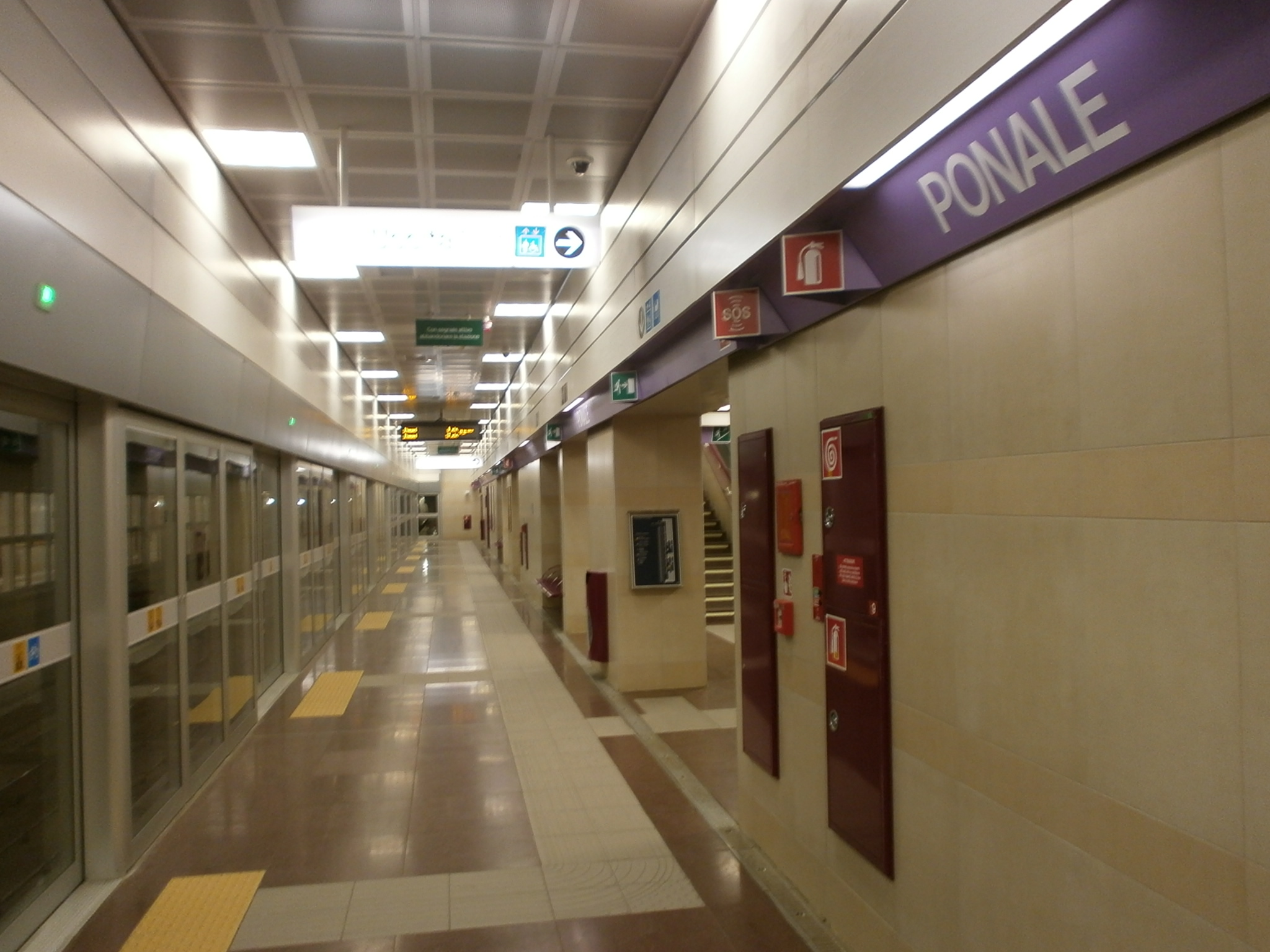

General information
- Owner: Azienda Trasporti Milanesi
- Platforms: 2
- Tracks: 2

Construction
- Structure type: Underground
- Accessible: yes

Other information
- Fare zone: STIBM: Mi1

History
- Opened: 10 February 2013; 13 years ago

Services
Preceding station	Milan Metro	Following station
Bignami Terminus	Line 5	Bicocca towards San Siro Stadio
Location

Ponale is a station on Line 5 of the Milan Metro.

== History ==
The works for the construction of the first section of Line 5, which includes Ponale station, began in September 2007, and it was opened on 10 February 2013.

== Station structure ==
Ponale is an underground station with two tracks in one tunnel and, like all the other stations on Line 5, is wheelchair accessible.

It is located at the intersection of Viale Fulvio Testi, Via Ponale and Via Chiese, but has exits only to Viale Fulvio Testi.

== Interchanges ==
Tram line 31 and bus stops are located near the station.
