= San Siro Ippodromo (Milan Metro) =

Milan metro station

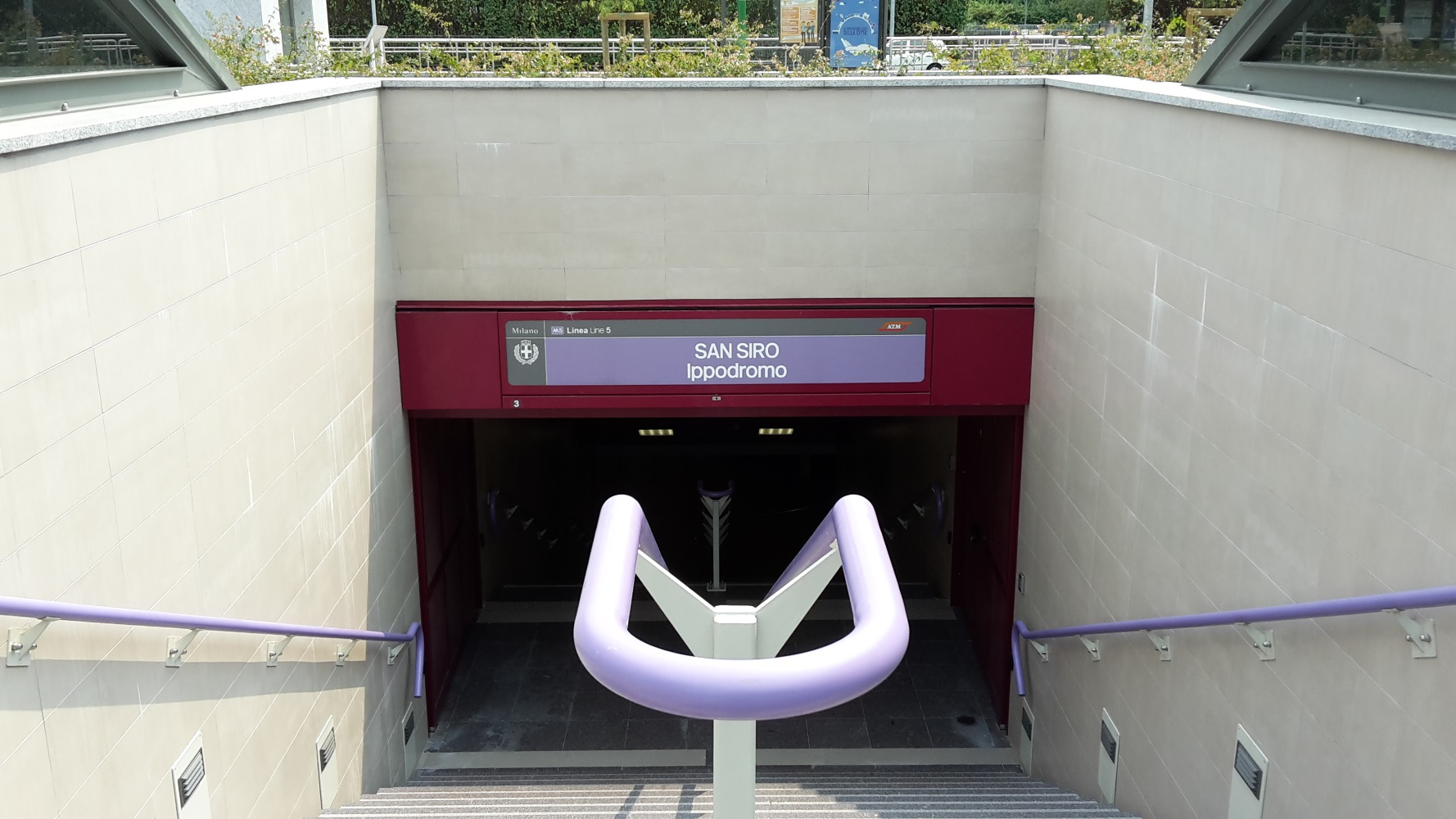

General information
- Coordinates: 45.476091°N 9.128468°E
- Owner: Azienda Trasporti Milanesi
- Platforms: 1
- Tracks: 2

Construction
- Structure type: Underground
- Accessible: yes

Other information
- Fare zone: STIBM: Mi1

History
- Opened: 29 April 2015; 11 years ago
- Closed: 5 June 2027; 9 months' time

Services
Preceding station	Milan Metro	Following station
Segesta towards Bignami	Line 5	San Siro Stadio Terminus
Location

San Siro Ippodromo is a station on Line 5 of the Milan Metro.

== History ==
The works for the construction of the station began in November 2010, as part of the second section of the line, from Garibaldi FS to San Siro Stadio. The station was opened to the public on 29 April 2015, a few days before the official opening of Expo 2015.

== Station structure ==
San Siro Ippodromo is an underground station with two tracks served by one island platform and, like all the other stations on Line 5, is wheelchair accessible.

== Interchanges ==
Near this station are located:

- Tram stops (line 16)
