= Bicocca =

Bicocca, meaning a small castle located in an elevated place (i.e. a small rocca), is a common term in Italian toponymy, It may refer to:

== Liguria ==
- "Collina Bicocca", a hill by Arenzano, in the Province of Genoa

== Lombardy ==
- Bicocca (district of Milan)
- Bicocca (Milan Metro), a station

== Piedmont ==
- Bicocca (district of Novara)
- Colle Bicocca, a hill in the Province of Cuneo
- Strada della Bicocca, a road in San Giusto Canavese, in the Province of Turin
- Torre della Bicocca ("Bicocca Tower"), a tower in Buttigliera Alta, Province of Turin

== Sicily ==
- Bicocca, a district of Catania

== Tuscany ==
- Monte Bicocca, a mountain in the Province of Lucca

== See also ==
- Battle of Bicocca, fought near Milan in 1522
- University of Milan Bicocca, informally referred to as "Bicocca", a large branch of the University of Milan
- Battle of Novara (1849) (AKA Battle of Bicocca), fought 1849
- Stazione di Catania Bicocca, a railway station of Catania
