= Portello =

Portello may refer to:

- Portello (district of Milan), a car-producing district of Milan, Italy
  - Portello (Milan Metro), an underground rail station
- Portello (soft drink), a type of fruit-flavored soft drink
- Portello Gate or Porta Ognissanti, in the walls of Padua, Italy
