= AnsaldoBreda Meneghino =

Train of the Milan Metro

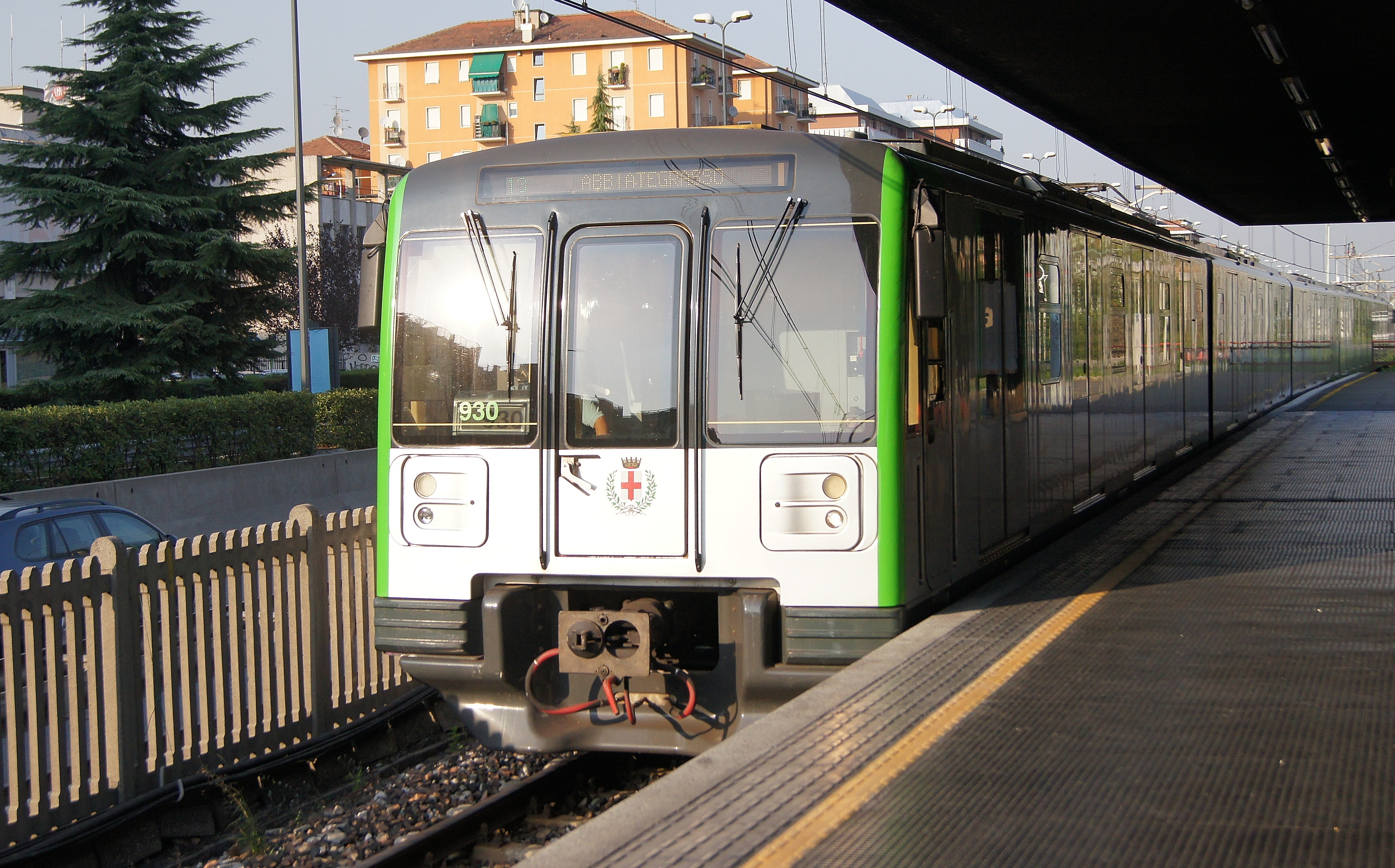
- A Milan Metro train
- In service: 2009–present
- Manufacturers: AnsaldoBreda and Firema
- Formation: 6 cars
- Capacity: 2 × 628
- Operator: Milan Metro
- Line served: Line M1 Line M2 Line M3

Specifications
- Train length: 105.5 m (346 ft 2 in)
- Width: 2.85 m (9 ft 4 in)
- Height: 3.65 m (12 ft 0 in)
- Doors: 12 per traction unit side
- Articulated sections: 2 3-car traction units
- Wheelbase: 2.15 m (7 ft 1 in) bogie wheelbase
- Maximum speed: 90 km/h (56 mph)
- Axle load: 12.5 t (12.3 long tons; 13.8 short tons)
- Traction system: IGBT–VVVF
- Electric systems: 750 V DC from third and/or fourth rail 750–1,500 V DC from overhead catenary
- Track gauge: 1,435 mm (4 ft 8 1/2 in) standard gauge

The 900 Series, nicknamed and commonly known as "Meneghino" is an electric multiple unit manufactured by Italian companies Firema and AnsaldoBreda, designed for the Milan Metro.

Its nickname means of Milan in Italian.

The trains are made up of 6 permanently coupled coaches, comprising two identical traction units at each end, with a total length of about 105 m (344 ft 6 in). Each Traction Unit consists of two identical motor cars and a trailer with the driver's cab. All the coaches are intercommunicating. The traction voltage can be 750 V or 1500 V to comply with the different voltages and feeding systems in use on Milan Metro lines (fourth rail on M1, catenary on M2 and M3). Trains have a total of 24 doors per side and are equipped with surveillance cameras and LCD screens.

The train began to replace the old Milan Metro trains in March 2009 on lines 1 and 2, as well as supplement the rolling stock on line 3. It is not used on lines 4 or 5, which use smaller-sized driverless trains.
