= Milan Metro Line 5 =

Subway line serving Milan, Italy

M5

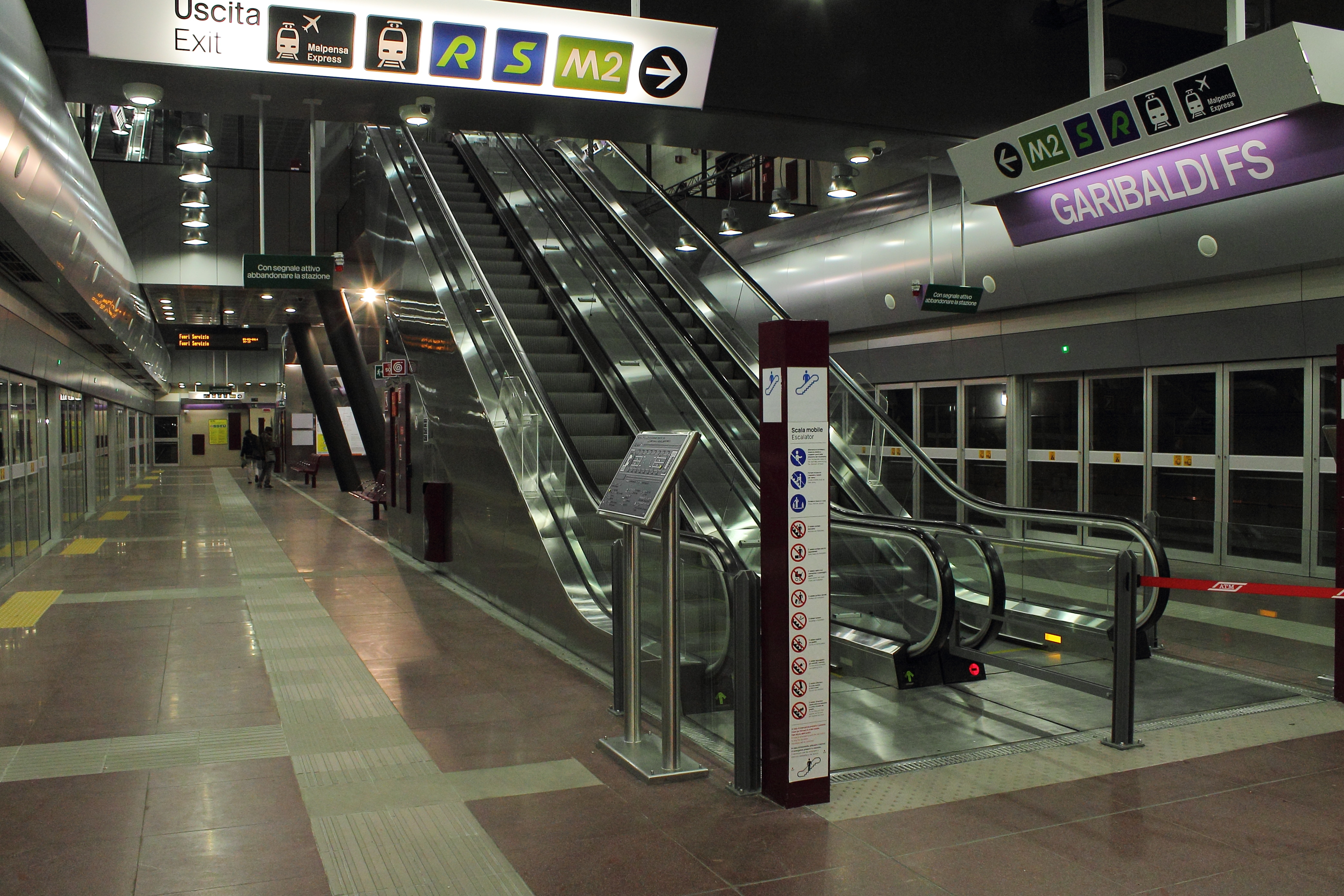
- Garibaldi FS station

Overview
- Status: Operational
- Locale: Milan, Italy
- Termini: Bignami; San Siro Stadio
- Stations: 19

Service
- Type: Rapid transit
- System: Milan Metro
- Operator: Azienda Trasporti Milanesi
- Rolling stock: Hitachi Rail Italy Driverless Metro
- Daily ridership: 130,000 (October 2015)
- Ridership: 37 million (2022) 44 million (2024) 25 million (January-June 2025)

History
- Opened: 10 February 2013; 13 years ago
- Last extension: 2015

Technical
- Line length: 12.9 km (8.0 mi)
- Number of tracks: 2
- Track gauge: 1,435 mm (4 ft 8 1/2 in) standard gauge
- Electrification: Third rail, 750 V DC
- Operating speed: 30 km/h (19 mph) (average); 80 km/h (50 mph) (maximum)
Route map

Line 5 is an underground rapid transit line in Milan, Italy, part of the Milan Metro. The line, also known as M5 or the Lilac Line (Linea Lilla in Italian), is 12.8 kilometres (8.0 mi) long and goes through the city from the north to the north-west. It opened in stages between 2013 and 2015.

The line operates using Hitachi Rail Italy Driverless Metro vehicles.

== Route ==
The line is fully underground, with a total length of 12.8 kilometres (8.0 mi) and serving 19 stations. It runs from Bignami to the north of the city to San Siro Stadio to the south-west in less than 26 minutes.

Station name	Transfer	Opening
Bignami		10 February 2013
Ponale		10 February 2013
Bicocca		10 February 2013
Ca’ Granda		10 February 2013
Istria		10 February 2013
Marche		10 February 2013
Zara	Milan Metro Line 3	10 February 2013
Isola		1 March 2014
Garibaldi FS	Milan Metro Line 2 Line S1 (Milan suburban railway service) Line S2 (Milan suburban railway service) Line S5 (Milan suburban railway service) Line S6 (Milan suburban railway service) Line S7 (Milan suburban railway service) Line S8 (Milan suburban railway service) Line S11 (Milan suburban railway service) Line S13 (Milan suburban railway service)	1 March 2014
Monumentale		11 October 2015
Cenisio		20 June 2015
Gerusalemme		26 September 2015
Domodossola	Line S3 (Milan suburban railway service) Line S4 (Milan suburban railway service)	29 April 2015
Tre Torri		14 November 2015
Portello		6 June 2015
Lotto	Milan Metro Line 1	29 April 2015
Segesta		29 April 2015
San Siro Ippodromo		29 April 2015
San Siro Stadio		29 April 2015

== Operation ==
The line is equipped with a third-rail power supply at a voltage of 750 V in direct current. It is the first line in Milan with a fully automatic management and driving system, as well as the first to have platform screen doors. The entire line is controlled and managed by a single control centre, located at the depot at the Bignami terminus. The line is connected to the rest of the network by a track between Isola and Garibaldi FS stations, which allows trains to reach the M2 line and then the Precotto depot on the M1 line, the closest one that is able to carry out repairs.

The platforms and trains are 50 meters (164 ft 1 in) long, compared to 110 of the other three lines of the Milan Metro. However, thanks to very high frequencies the passenger capacity is high at 24,000 passengers per hour. Although the complete automation allows a maximum frequency of one train every 90 seconds (75 in some cases), the current maximum frequency is 150 seconds due to the limited number of trains available.

== Management ==
The company responsible for construction works and operation is Metro 5 S.p.A., a consortium of:

- Ansaldo STS (24.6%)
- Astaldi (23.3%)
- Azienda Trasporti Milanesi (20.0%)
- Torno Global Contracting (15.4%)
- Alstom (9.4%)
- AnsaldoBreda (7.3%)

Metro 5 covered 40% of global construction costs, and will operate the line for 27 years from the opening.

== Rolling stock ==
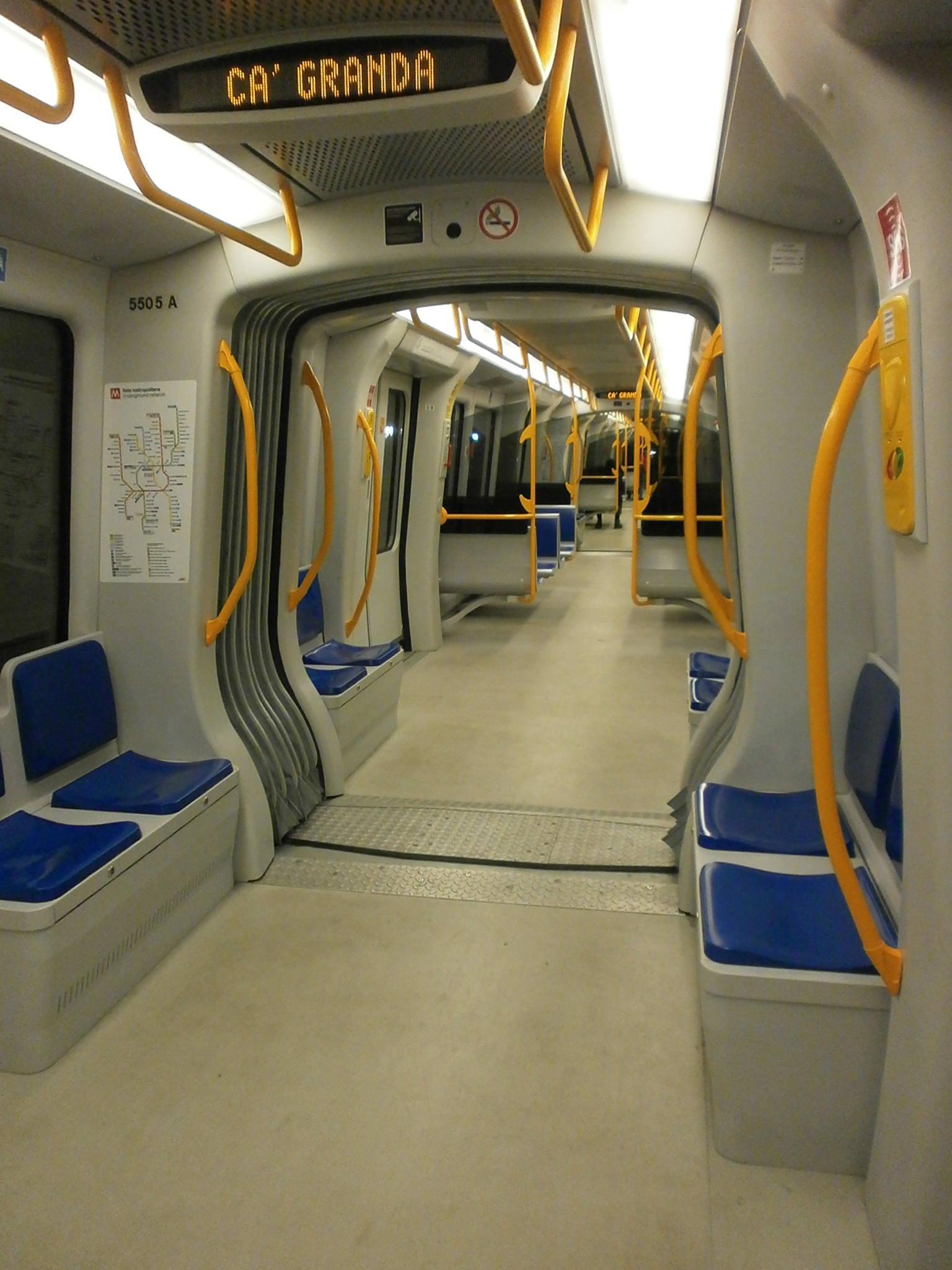
AnsaldoBreda driverless train in service in Milan.

The line uses 21 four-car articulated driverless trains from AnsaldoBreda (now Hitachi Rail Italy), part of the AnsaldoBreda Driverless Metro system.

Classified Series 5500, they were designed by Giugiaro, and are about 50 meters (164 ft 1 in) long, 2.65 meters (8 ft 8 in) wide, with seating for 96 and a maximum capacity 536 passengers.

The systems are controlled by a fully automated computer system, located at the control and maintenance center.

== Future extensions ==
A northern extension from Bignami to Monza has been approved. It will consist of 11 new stations.

Station name	Transfer	Grade
Testi-Gorky		Underground
Rondinella-Crocetta		Underground
Lincoln		Underground
Bettola	Milan Metro Line 1	Underground
Campania		Underground
Marsala		Underground
Monza Fs	Line S7 (Milan suburban railway service) Line S8 (Milan suburban railway service) Line S9 (Milan suburban railway service) Line S11 (Milan suburban railway service)	Underground
Trento e Trieste		Underground
Villa Reale-Parco di Monza		Underground
Ospedale San Gerardo		Underground
Polo istituzionale		Underground

== See also ==
- Light metro
