= Garibaldi FS (Milan Metro) =

Milan metro station

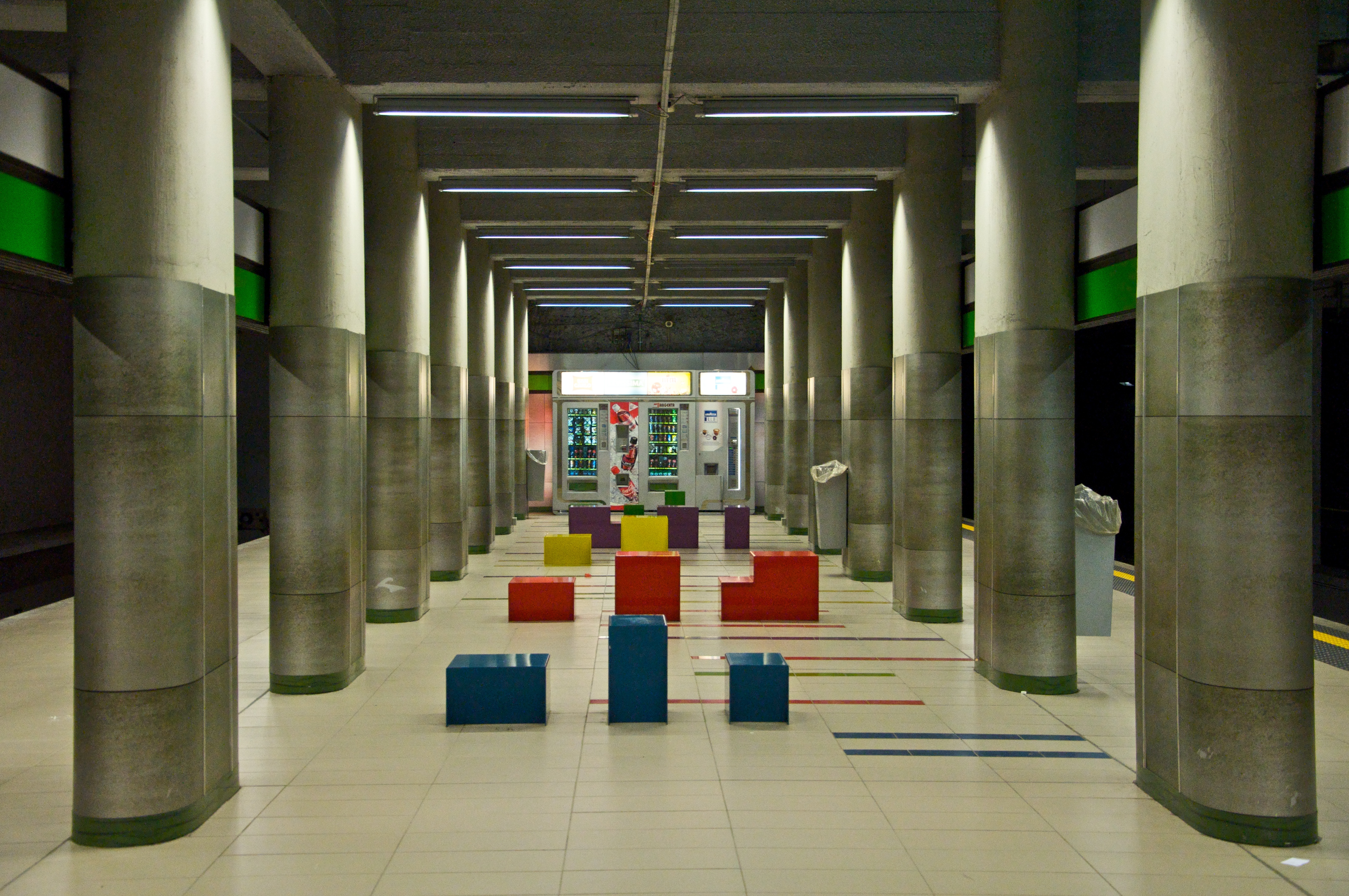

General information
- Location: Milan
- Coordinates: 45°29′00″N 9°11′16″E
- Owner: Azienda Trasporti Milanesi
- Platforms: 2 (line 2); 1 (line 5)
- Tracks: 4 (line 2, 2 of them are unused); 2 (line 5)
- Connections: Porta Garibaldi railway station

Construction
- Structure type: Underground
- Platform levels: 2
- Accessible: yes

Other information
- Fare zone: STIBM: Mi1

History
- Opened: Line 2: 12 July 1971; 55 years ago Line 5: 1 March 2014; 12 years ago

Services
| Preceding station | Milan Metro | Following station |
|---|---|---|
| Moscova towards Assago or Abbiategrasso | Line 2 | Gioia towards Cologno Nord or Gessate |
| Isola towards Bignami | Line 5 | Monumentale towards San Siro Stadio |
Location
- Location within Milan Location within Lombardy Location within Northern Italy Location within Italy

Garibaldi FS is a station on Lines 2 and 5 of the Milan Metro, and the Milan Passante railway. The Line 2 station was opened on 21 July 1971 as part of the extension from Centrale. It served as the western terminus until 3 March 1978, when the first trains could travel the new route to Cadorna. The Passante station was opened in 1997, and the Line 5 station in 2014.

The station is located on Viale Don Luigi Sturzo, near the Piazza Sigmund Freud, within the territory of the municipality of Milan. This is an underground station, located under Milano Porta Garibaldi railway station.

Garibaldi is the only Metro station in Milan, along with surface station Cascina Gobba, to have four tracks: two tracks are used for normal access to the trains, while the other two, located outside the platforms, are not used, one of them being partially removed. This peculiarity is due to the never-built project of expeditious lines of Brianza, a group of light rail lines that were supposed to replace the tram trunk of Brianza, reaching two of the four tracks at the station of Garibaldi, allowing a good exchange.
