= Milan Metro =

Rapid transit system serving Milan, Italy

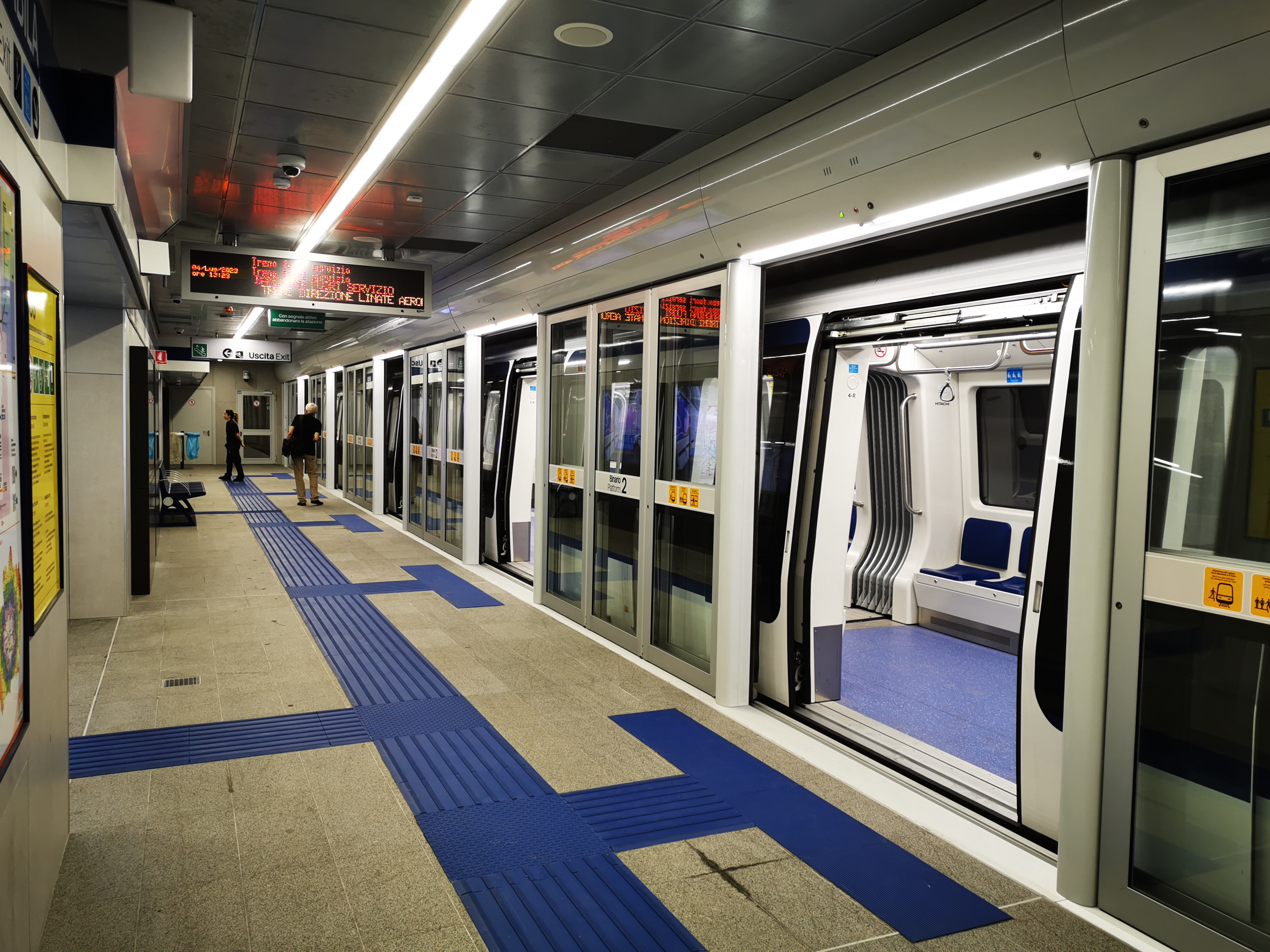
- Line M4 at San Babila

Overview
- Native name: Metropolitana di Milano
- Locale: Milan, Lombardy, Italy
- Transit type: Rapid transit
- Number of lines: 5
- Number of stations: 125, 2 (under construction)
- Daily ridership: 1.39 million (2018 average weekday); 1.57 million (2018 peak)
- Annual ridership: 369 million (2018)
- Website: www.atm.it/en/

Operation
- Began operation: 1 November 1964; 62 years ago
- Operator: Azienda Trasporti Milanesi
- Number of vehicles: 225 (2023)

Technical
- System length: 111.8 km (69.5 mi)
- Track gauge: 1,435 mm (4 ft 8 1/2 in) standard gauge
- Electrification: Line 1: Fourth rail, 750 V DC; Line 2 & 3: Overhead line, 1,500 V DC; Line 4 & 5: Third rail, 750 V DC
System map

The Milan Metro (Italian: Metropolitana di Milano) is the rapid transit system serving Milan, Italy, operated by Azienda Trasporti Milanesi. The network consists of five lines with a total network length of 111.8 kilometres (69.5 mi), and a total of 125 stations (+2 in construction), mostly underground. It has a daily ridership of about 1.4 million on weekdays. The Milan Metro is the largest rapid transit system in Italy in terms of length, number of stations and ridership; and the fifth longest in the European Union and the eighth in Europe.

The first line, Line 1, opened in 1964; Line 2 opened 5 years later in 1969, Line 3 in 1990, Line 5 (driverless) in 2013, and Line 4 (driverless) in 2022. There are also several extensions planned and under construction. The architectural project of the Milan Metro, created by Franco Albini and Franca Helg, and the signs, designed by Bob Noorda, received the Compasso d'Oro award in 1964.

== History ==
The first project for the network in 1952.

The first projects for a subway line in Milan were drawn up in 1914 and 1925, following the examples of underground transport networks in other European cities such as London and Paris. Planning proceeded in 1938 for the construction of a system of 7 lines, but this too halted after the start of World War II and due to a lack of funds.

On 3 July 1952, the city administration voted for a project of a metro system and on 6 October 1955, a new company, Metropolitana Milanese, was created to manage the construction of the new infrastructure. The project was funded with ₤ 500 million from the municipality and the rest from a loan. The construction site of the first line was opened in viale Monte Rosa on 4 May 1957. Stations on the new line were designed by Franco Albini and Franca Helg architecture studio, while Bob Noorda designed the signage. For this project both Albini-Helg and Noorda won the Compasso d'Oro prize.

The first section from Lotto to Sesto Marelli (21 stations) was opened on 1 November 1964 after 7 years of construction works. Two trains adorned with Italian flags left at 10.41 a.m. and arrived at the Sesto Marelli terminus at 11.15 a.m., greeted by the notes of the national anthem and the triumphal march of Giuseppe Verdi's opera "Aida". The track was 12.5 km (7.8 mi) long, and the mean distance between the stations was 590 m (1,940 ft). In the same year, in April, works on the second line started. Passengers on the network grew constantly through the first years of service, passing from 37,092,315 in 1965 to 61,937,192 in 1969.

The green line from Caiazzo to Cascina Gobba (7 stations) opened five years later. During the 1960s and 1970s, the network of 2 lines was completed, and both lines had 2 different spurs. In 1978, the lines were already 17.6 km (10.9 mi) and 23 km (14 mi) long respectively, with 28 and 22 stations.

The first section of the third line (yellow), with 5 stations, was opened on 3 May 1990 after almost 9 years of construction works. The line opened just before the World Cup. The other 9 stations on Line 3 opened to the southeast in 1991, and northwest to Maciachini Station in 2004.

In March 2005, the Line 2 Abbiategrasso station (south branch from Famagosta) and the Line 1 Rho Fiera station opened. The intermediate station of Pero, on line 1, opened in December 2005. A north extension of Line 3 to Comasina (4 stations) and a new south branch on Line 2 to Assago (2 stations) opened in early 2011.

Network evolution

The first stage of the Line 5 (the first automated line of the network), covering the 4.1 kilometres (2.5 mi) from Bignami to Zara, in the northern part of the municipality, opened on 10 February 2013. The 1.9-kilometre (1.2 mi) second stage, from Zara to Garibaldi FS, opened on 1 March 2014. The 7-kilometre (4.3 mi) third stage, from Garibaldi FS to San Siro Stadio, in the west of the city, opened on 29 April 2015, with some intermediate stations not in service at that time; as of November 2015, all the stations have been opened.

The metro replaced several interurban tram routes of the original Società Trazione Elettrica Lombarda (STEL) tramlines, in particular the Line 2 to Gessate.

In November 2022, the first six stations of the automated line 4 were opened, from Linate airport to Dateo; it was the first metro line to be inaugurated without any connection to the rest of the system, instead relying on a connection to the suburban railway network at Dateo railway station; the line was extended in 2023 to San Babila, linking it to line 1, and in 2024 to San Cristoforo FS, another railway station, in the city west.

=== Timeline ===
Timeline of Milan Metro construction
date	section or station	line
1 November 1964	Lotto - Sesto Marelli	Milan Metro Line 1
2 April 1966	Pagano - Gambara	Milan Metro Line 1
27 September 1969	Caiazzo - Cascina Gobba	Milan Metro Line 2
27 April 1970	Caiazzo - Centrale	Milan Metro Line 2
12 July 1971	Centrale - Porta Garibaldi	Milan Metro Line 2
4 December 1972	Cascina Gobba - Gorgonzola	Milan Metro Line 2
18 April 1975	Gambara - Inganni	Milan Metro Line 1
8 November 1975	Lotto - QT8	Milan Metro Line 1
3 March 1978	Porta Garibaldi - Cadorna	Milan Metro Line 2
12 April 1980	QT8 - San Leonardo	Milan Metro Line 1
7 June 1981	Cascina Gobba - Cologno Nord	Milan Metro Line 2
30 October 1983	Cadorna - Porta Genova	Milan Metro Line 2
13 April 1985	Gorgonzola - Gessate; Porta Genova - Romolo	Milan Metro Line 2
28 September 1986	San Leonardo - Molino Dorino; Sesto Marelli - Sesto 1° Maggio FS	Milan Metro Line 1
3 May 1990	Centrale - Duomo	Milan Metro Line 3
16 December 1990	Duomo - Porta Romana	Milan Metro Line 3
12 May 1991	Centrale - Sondrio; Porta Romana - San Donato	Milan Metro Line 3
21 March 1992	Inganni - Bisceglie	Milan Metro Line 1
1 November 1994	Romolo - Famagosta	Milan Metro Line 2
16 December 1995	Sondrio - Zara	Milan Metro Line 3
8 December 2003	Zara - Maciachini	Milan Metro Line 3
17 March 2005	Famagosta - Abbiategrasso	Milan Metro Line 2
19 December 2005	Molino Dorino - Rho Fiera	Milan Metro Line 1
20 February 2011	Famagosta - Milanofiori Forum	Milan Metro Line 2
26 March 2011	Maciachini - Comasina	Milan Metro Line 3
10 February 2013	Zara - Bignami	Milan Metro Line 5
1 March 2014	Zara - Porta Garibaldi	Milan Metro Line 5
29 April 2015	Porta Garibaldi - San Siro Stadio	Milan Metro Line 5
6 June 2015	Portello	Milan Metro Line 5
20 June 2015	Cenisio	Milan Metro Line 5
26 September 2015	Gerusalemme	Milan Metro Line 5
11 October 2015	Monumentale	Milan Metro Line 5
14 November 2015	Tre Torri	Milan Metro Line 5
26 November 2022	Linate Aeroporto - Dateo	Milan Metro Line 4
4 July 2023	Dateo - San Babila	Milan Metro Line 4
12 October 2024	San Babila - San Cristoforo	Milan Metro Line 4

== Infrastructure ==
=== Lines ===
The system comprises 5 lines. All the lines run underground except for the northern part of Line 2 and the Line 2 Assago branch.

There are 9 interchange stations, each with 2 lines: Loreto (Lines 1 and 2); Cadorna (Lines 1 and 2), terminus of Ferrovienord railway network, Centrale (Lines 2 and 3), also Milan's main train station; Duomo (Lines 1 and 3), considered the center of the city; Zara (Lines 3 and 5); Garibaldi (Lines 2 and 5), also a major railway station; Lotto (Lines 1 and 5); San Babila (Lines 1 and 4) and Sant’Ambrogio (Lines 2 and 4)

As of 2012, existing lines ran in the Milan municipality for 80% of the total length (92 stations), and the network covered about 20% of Milan's urban area. Beside Milan, 13 other neighbouring municipalities are served: Assago, Bussero, Cassina de' Pecchi, Cernusco sul Naviglio, Cologno Monzese, Gessate, Gorgonzola, Pero, Rho, San Donato Milanese, Segrate, Sesto San Giovanni, Vimodrone.

The metro network is also linked with the suburban rail service, with 14 interchange stations: Affori FN, Cadorna FN, Dateo, Domodossola, Stazione Forlanini, Garibaldi FS, Lambrate FS, San Cristoforo FS, Lodi T.I.B.B. (with the nearby Porta Romana station), Porta Venezia, Repubblica, Rho Fiera, Rogoredo FS, Romolo and Sesto 1º Maggio.

The track gauge for all lines is the 1,435 mm (4 ft 8 1/2 in) standard gauge. Platform screen doors are present in all stations on Line 4 and Line 5 and on some stations on Line 1.

Line	Terminals		Opened	Latest extension	Length (km)	Stations	Avg. station distance (km)
Milan Metro Line 1	Rho Fiera / Bisceglie	Sesto 1º Maggio	1964	2005	26.7	38	0.727
Milan Metro Line 2	Assago Milanofiori Forum / Abbiategrasso	Cologno Nord / Gessate	1969	2011	39.9	35	1.159
Milan Metro Line 3	Comasina	San Donato	1990	2011	17.3	21	0.835
Milan Metro Line 4	Linate Aeroporto	San Cristoforo FS	2022	2024	15	21	0.723
Milan Metro Line 5	San Siro Stadio	Bignami	2013	2015	12.9	19	0.763

=== Power supply ===
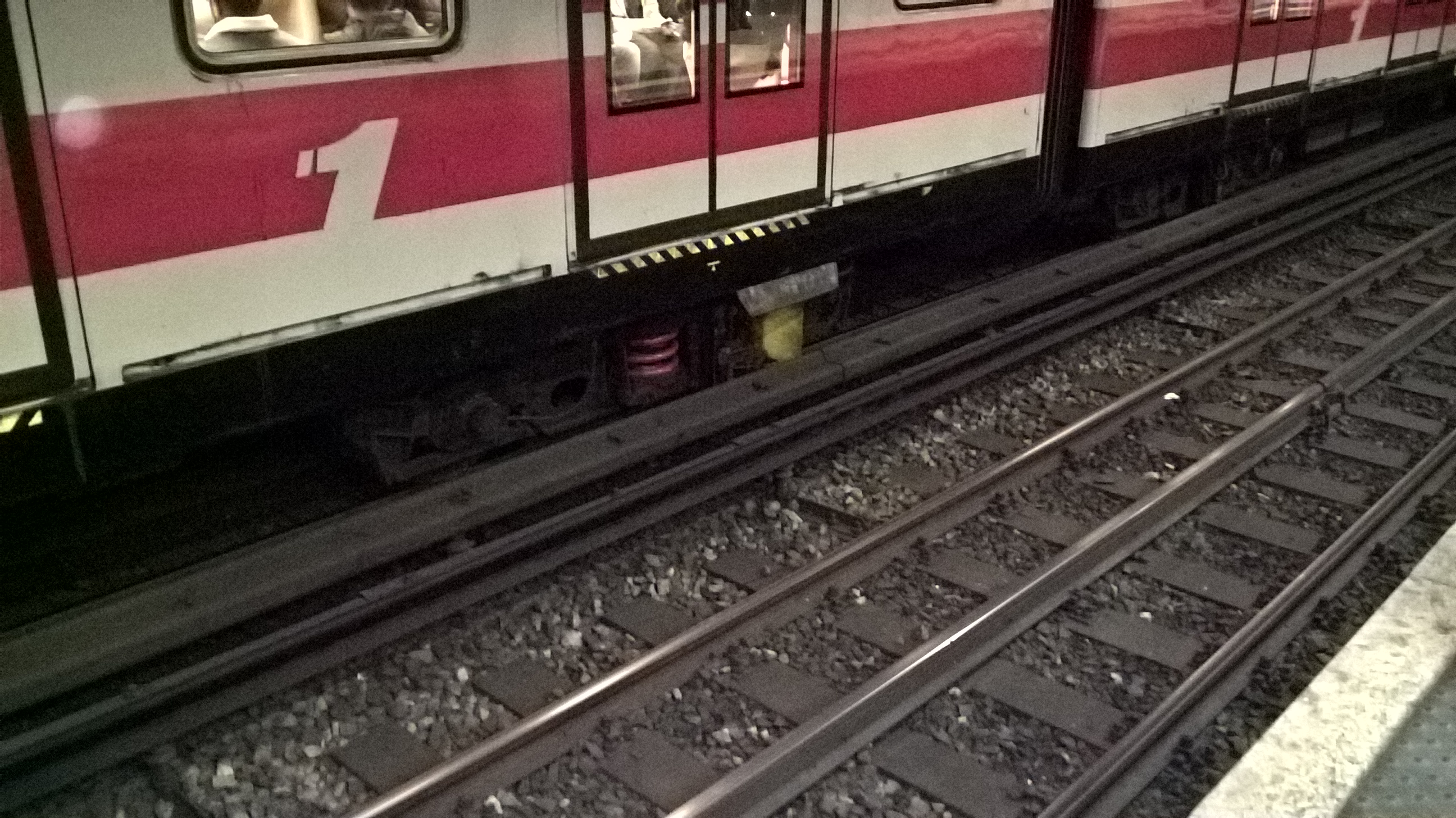
An M1 train with one of the fourth-rail contact shoes

Lines 2 and 3 use overhead lines to supply the electric current to the train and are electrified at 1500 V DC. Line 1, electrified at 750 V DC, uses a fourth rail system, although the same line also supports overhead lines in some stretches and depots; this allows Line 2 and 3 trains to use Line 1 tracks to reach a depot placed on the line. Line 4 and Line 5 trains are supplied by a third rail system at 750 V DC.

=== Passenger information ===
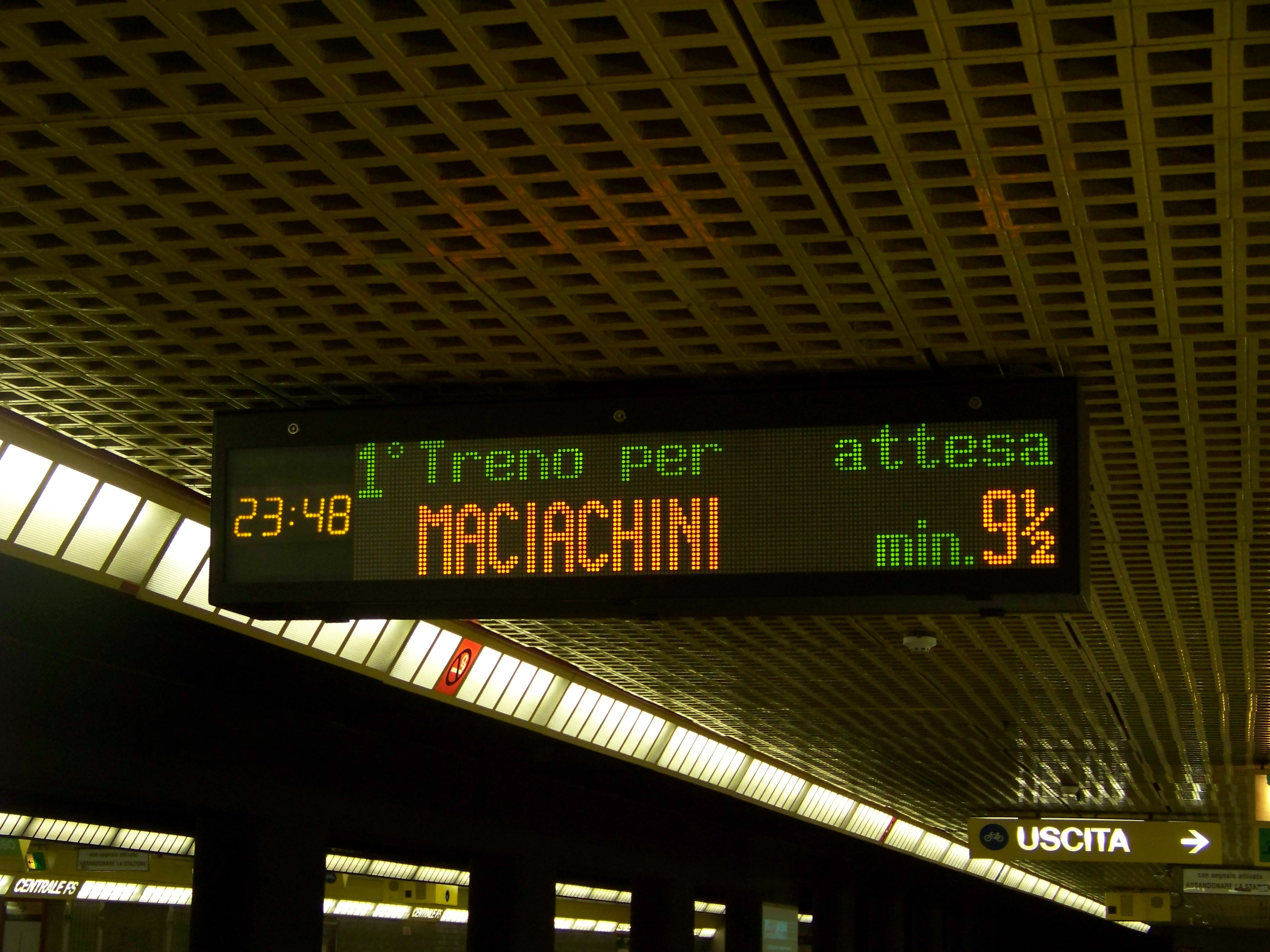
An M3 LED screen announcing the waiting time

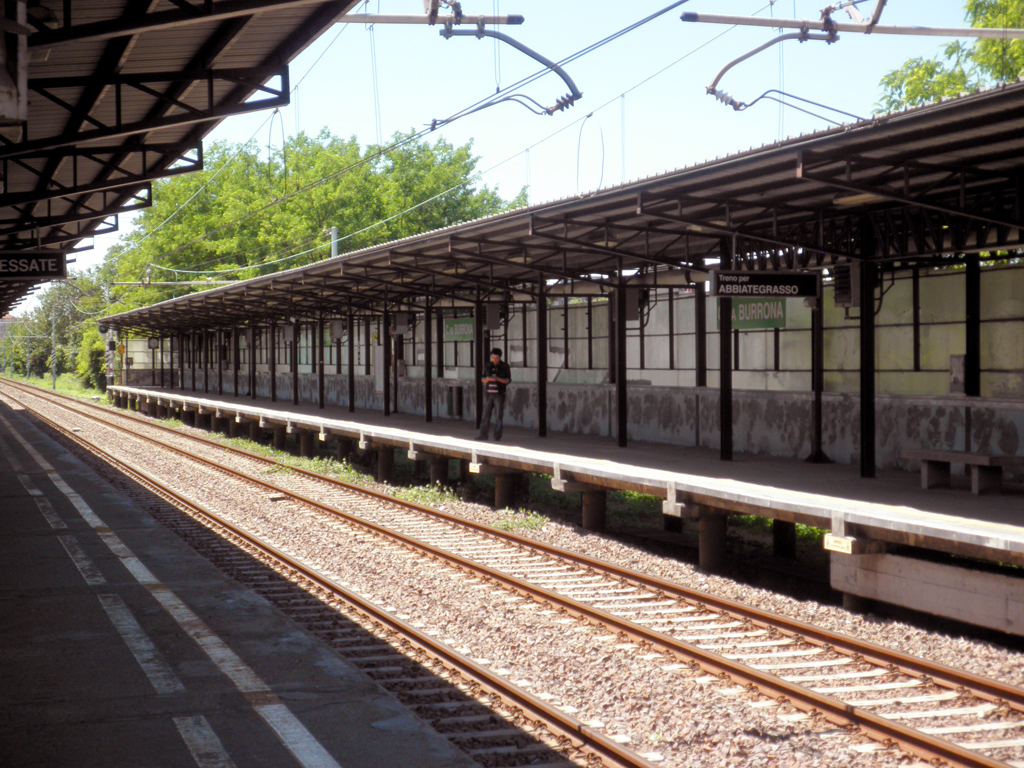
Cascina Burrona stop on the M2 Gessate branch, an example of a surface suburban stop

All the stations are provided with LED screens showing the destination and waiting time of coming trains. In every station, a recorded voice announces the direction of every approaching train and, at the platform, the name of the station. While older trains have no on-train information, the new Meneghino and Leonardo trains and the driverless trains on Line 5 are equipped with displays and recorded announcements in Italian and in English.

=== Mobile phone coverage ===
Since December 2009 all stations and trains of the Milan metro have full UMTS and HSDPA connectivity. Mobile operators TIM and Vodafone also provide LTE connectivity in all lines.

== Rolling stock ==
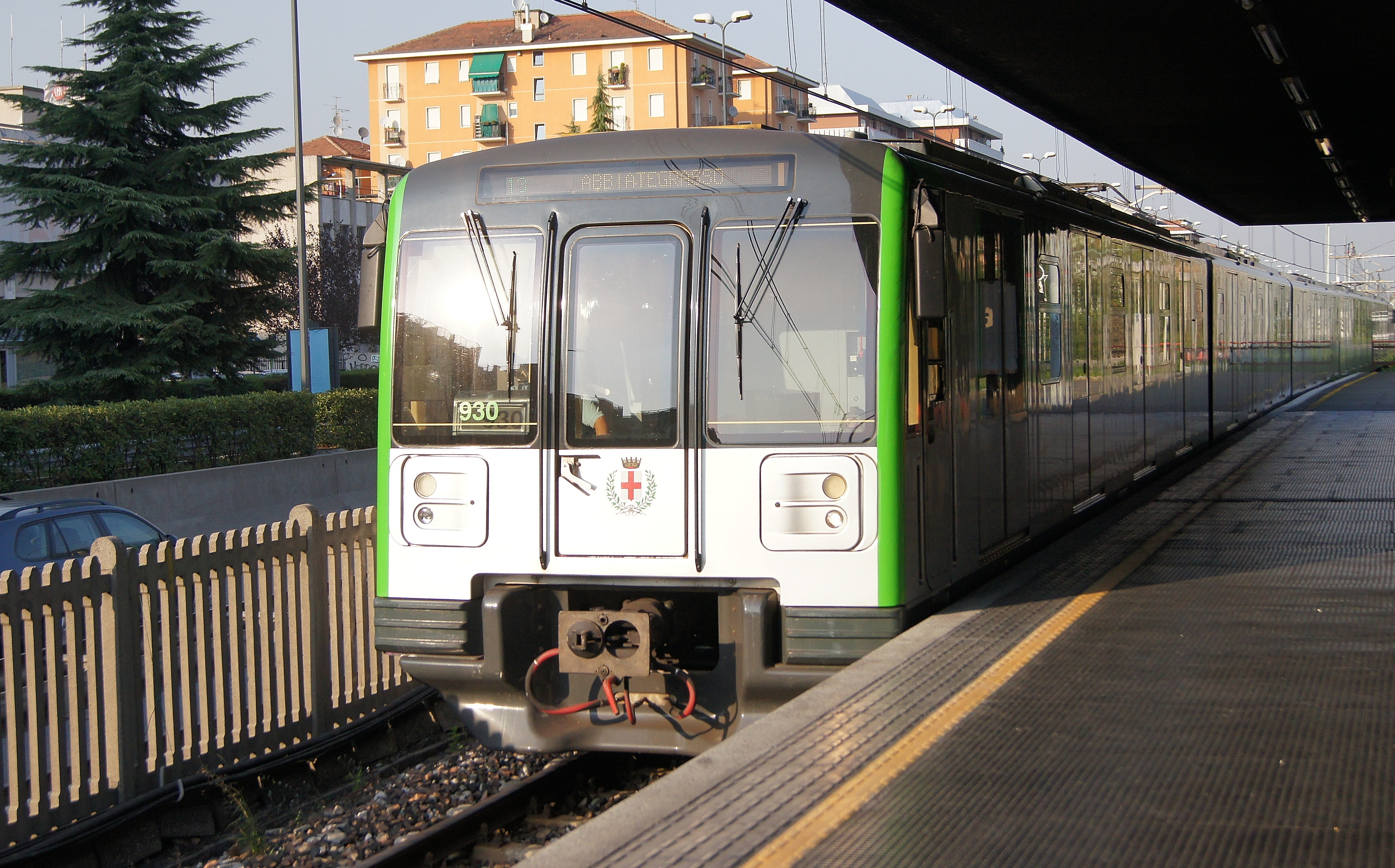
A Meneghino train on M2

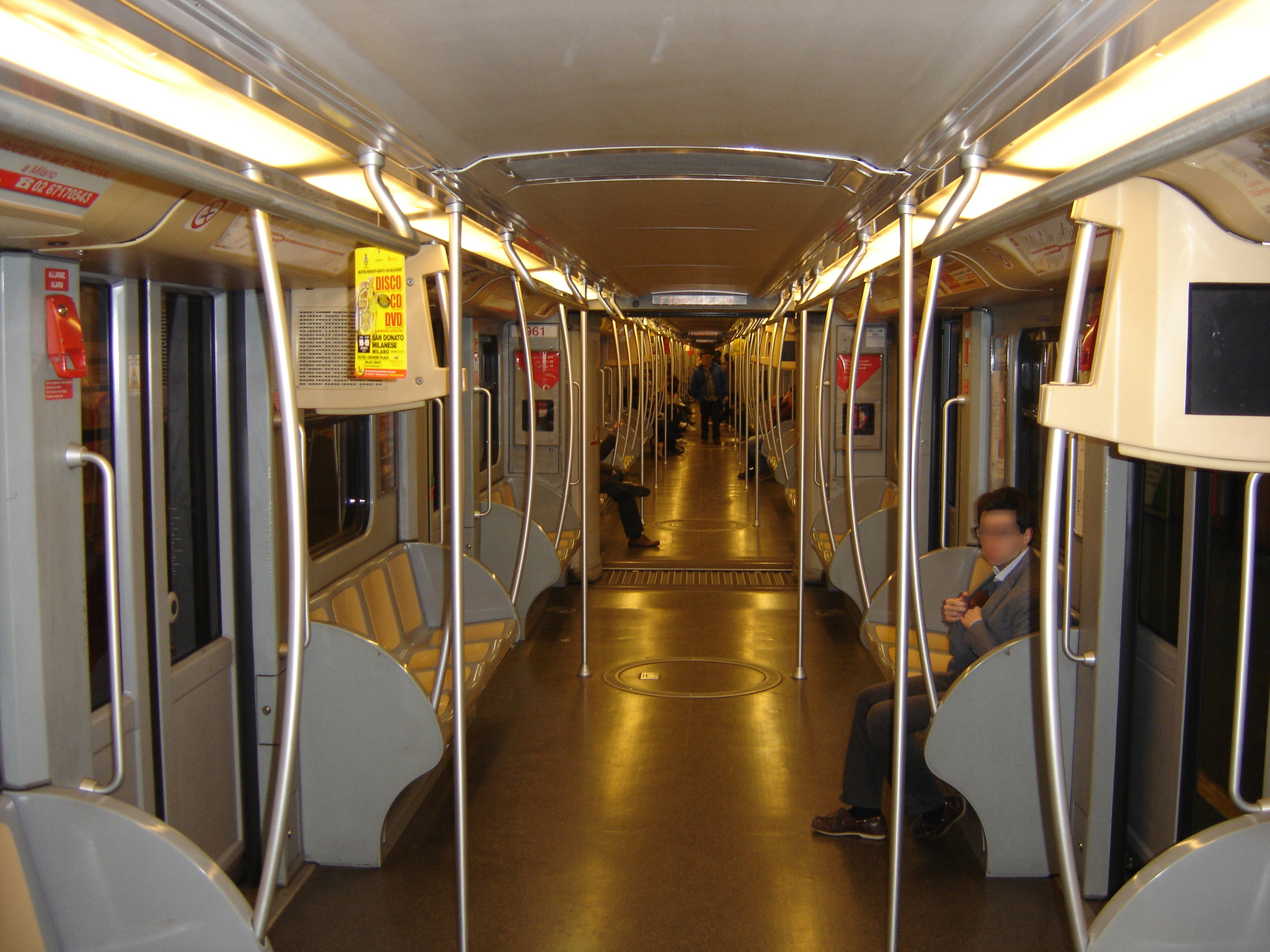
Inside a Meneghino train on M3

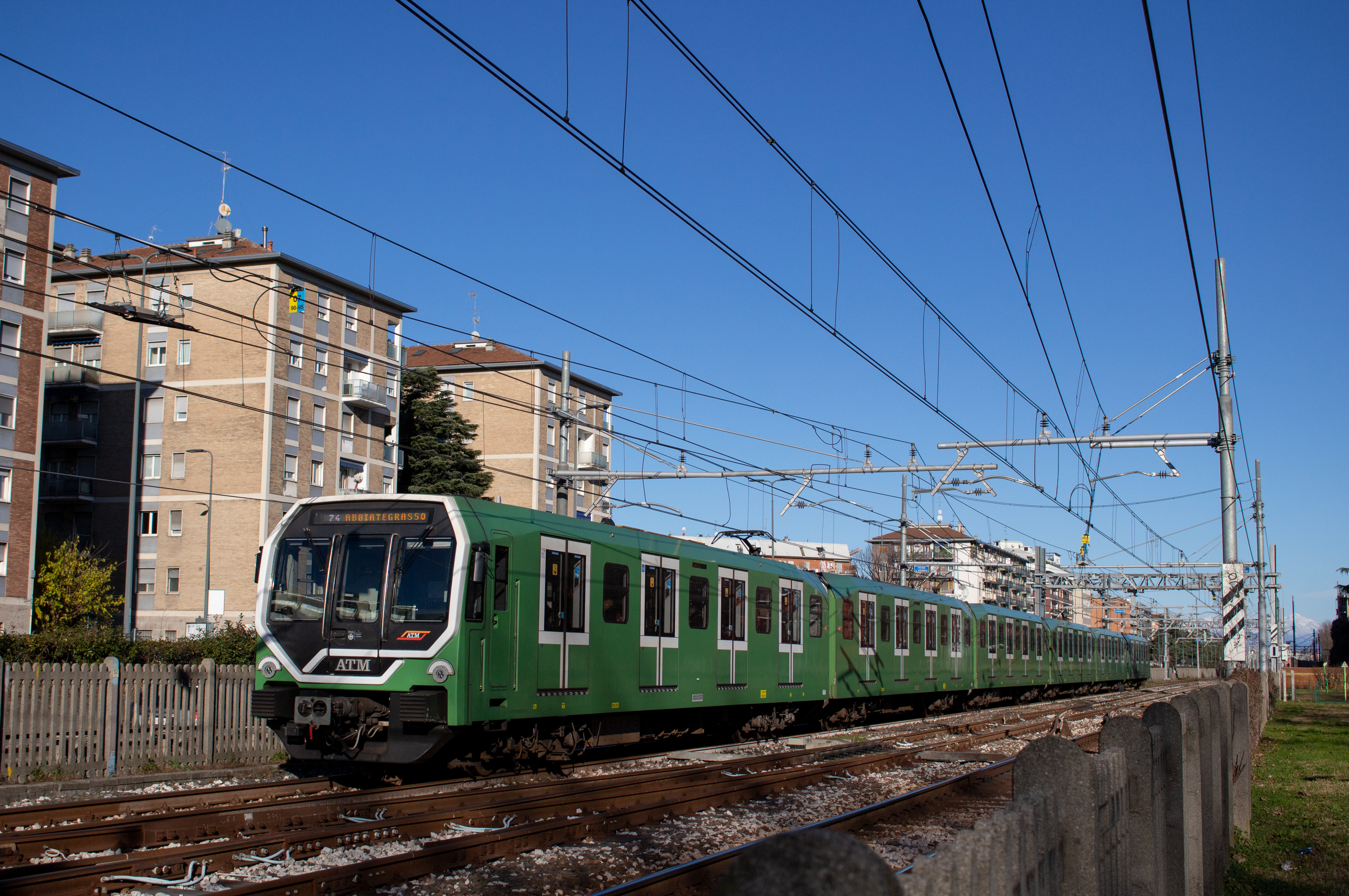
A Leonardo train arriving at Cimiano Station

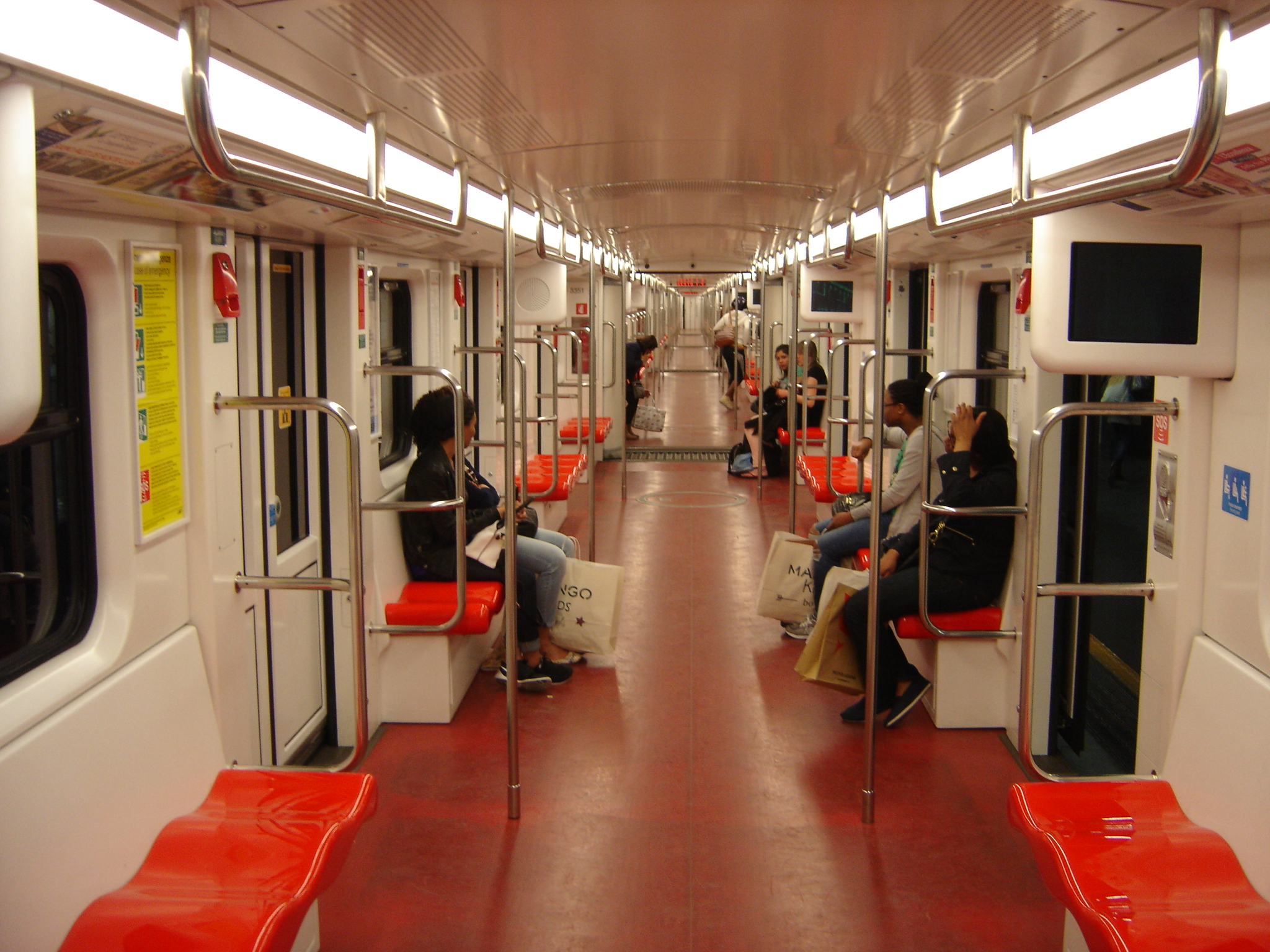
Interior of a Leonardo on M1

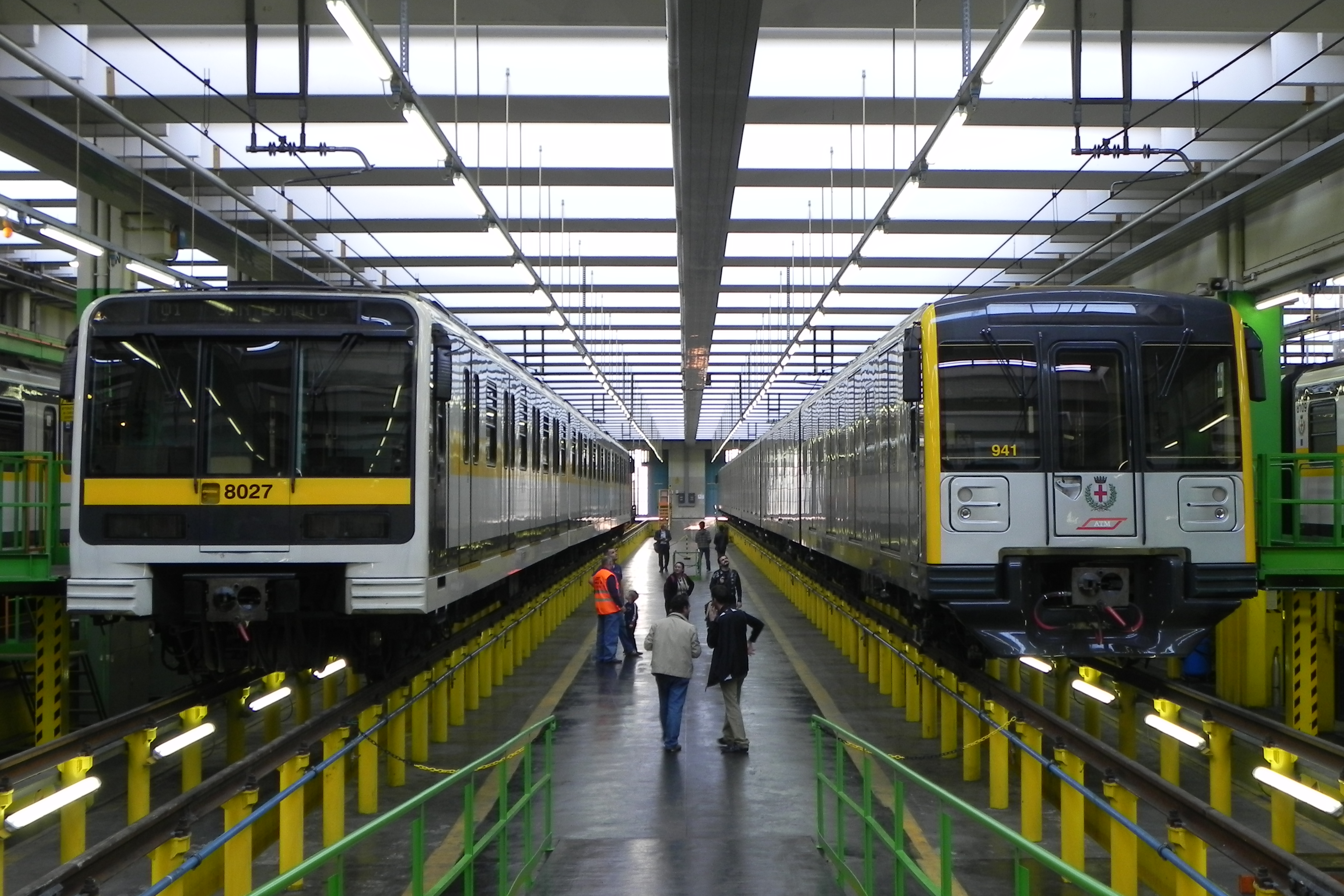
M3 rolling stock at the Rogoredo depot

The first 3 lines are heavy rapid-transit lines, with 6-car trains, about 105 m in length. Line 4 and Line 5 are light metro lines, with 4-car trains, about 50 m long. They use the same Hitachi Rail Italy Driverless Metro trains with different interior configurations (M4 trains have a seat arrangement similar to those of the first 3 lines).

== Service ==
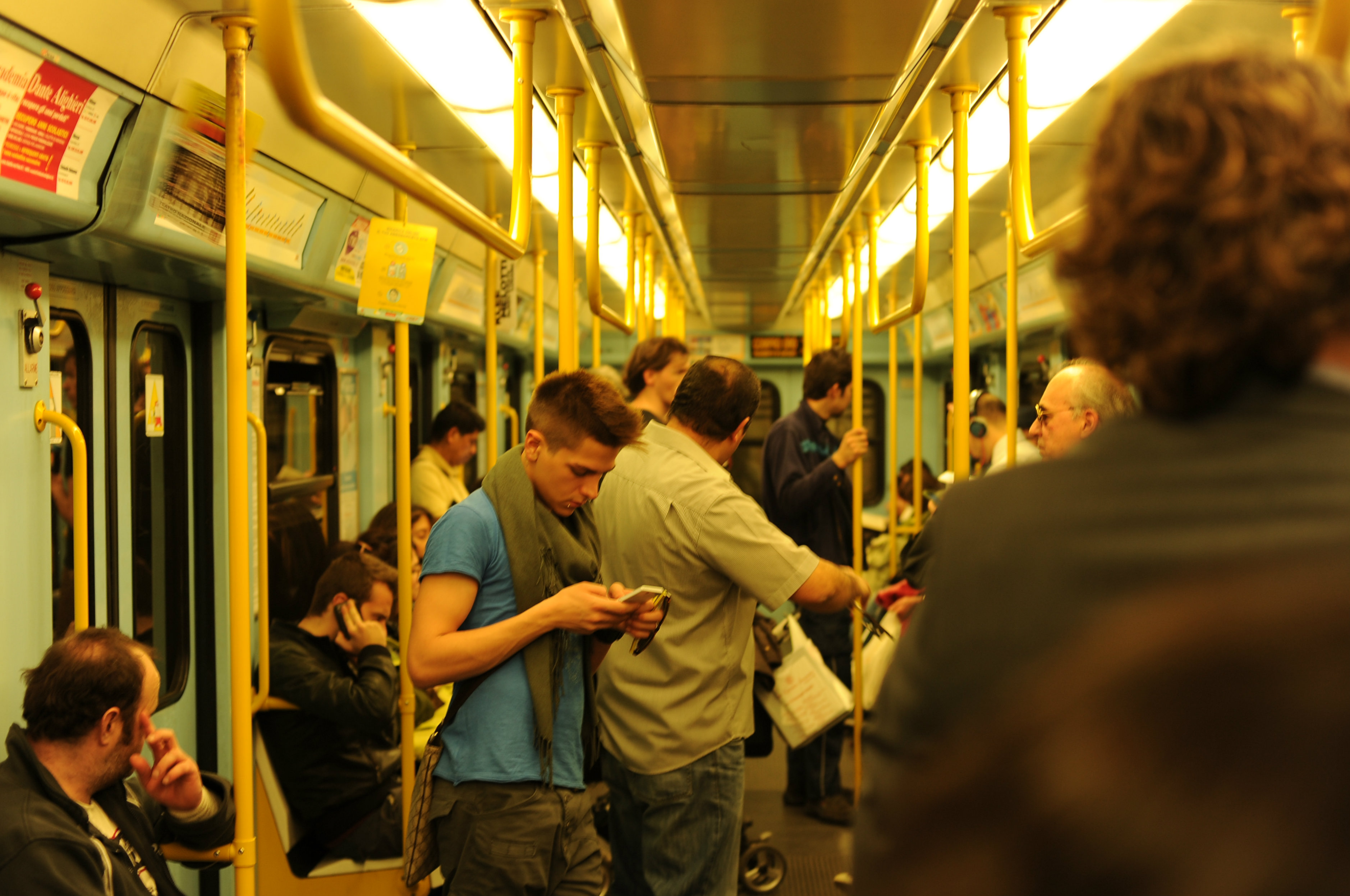
M3 train interior

=== Tickets ===
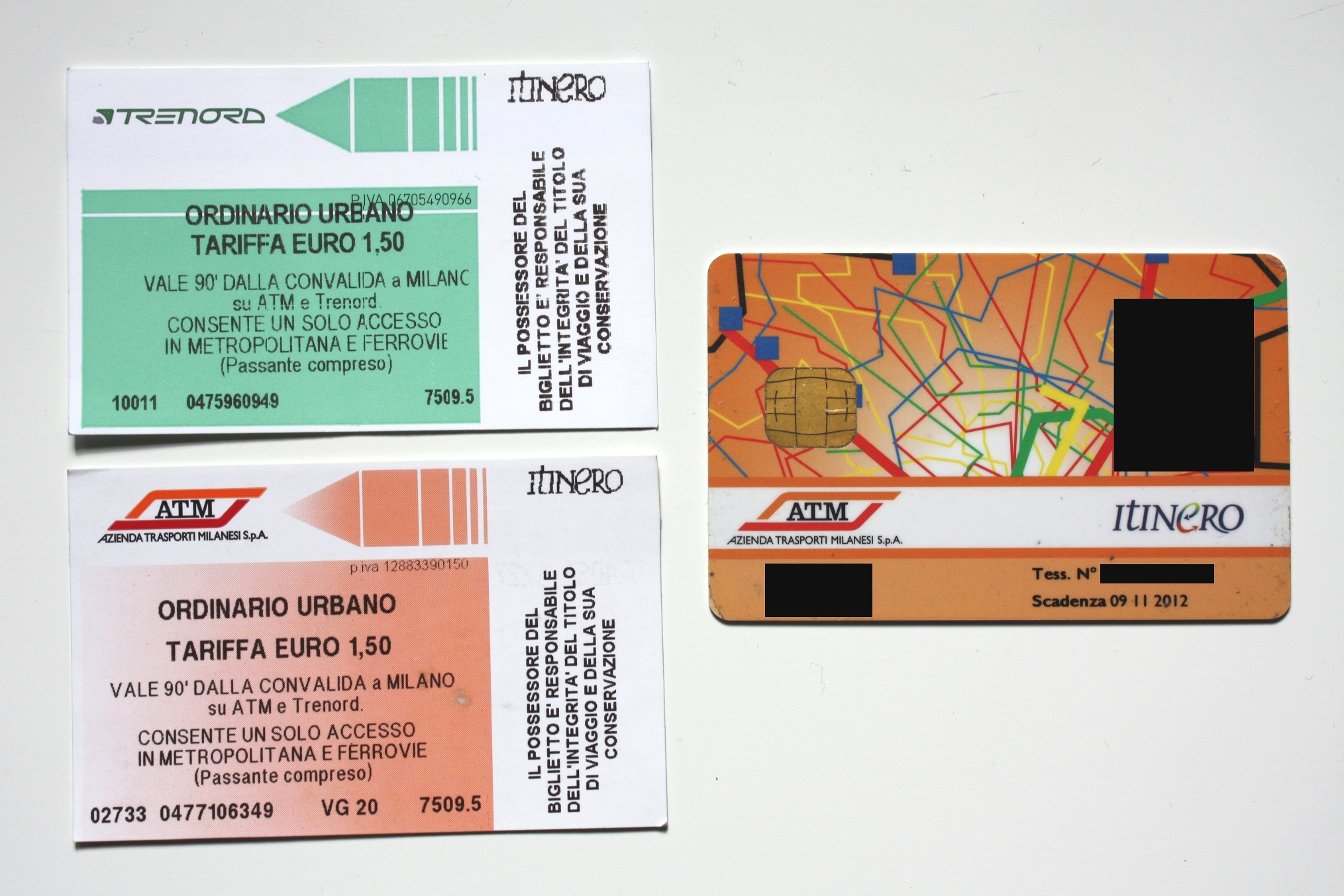
Former Milan urban tickets from Trenord (top left) and ATM (bottom left). An Itinero smart card, with name, photo and card number covered (right).

A standard ticket costs €2.20 and is valid for 90 minutes since its validation on metro, tram, bus, trolleybus and suburban lines within Milan and 21 bordering municipalities. Other tickets are available as well, such as daily, weekly, monthly, annual, student and senior passes. Additional fares are required to travel outside Milan and the 21 bordering municipalities.

Paper tickets can be substituted by contactless bank card payments, provided the trip starts in the metro, by tapping in the orange gates installed in every metro station. This payment method is not available on suburban lines; it was expected to be implemented on trams and buses starting by the end of 2019; it was eventually introduced in December 2020 on three urban bus lines, with plans for coverage on all the network by 2023.

Between 2004 and 2007, ATM introduced Itinero smartcard, a proximity card which can be charged with season tickets, replacing paper for this type of ticket. At the beginning of 2010, a new smartcard, RicaricaMi, was introduced. The new card can be charged up with credit and can be used for travel in place of magnetic paper tickets, on the model of London's Oyster card.

Milan metro lines can also be accessed with the regional integrated ticket "Io viaggio ovunque in Lombardia", as 1 to 7 days tickets or longer subscriptions using the smartcard "Io Viaggio".

=== Opening hours ===
The service starts at about 5:40 am and ends at about 0:30. During Sundays and holidays service usually starts later and ends a bit later, depending on the occasion. M5 stations Segesta and San Siro Ippodromo typically close after events at nearby Meazza Stadium to avoid passenger congestion.

Headways at peak hours vary from two minutes on M1 and M2’s main-branches to three minutes on M3, with secondary-branch headways doubling, at around four minutes. Driverless rolling stock on M4 and M5 allow for more frequent service, with headways as low as ninety seconds during peak hours.

=== Night service ===
A night service has operated since 2015 with buses for line M1, M2, M3 and, from 2022, M4. The bus service follows roughly the same route and stops at the same stations of the metro for most of the central part. The entire lines 1, 3 and 4 and the urban section of line 2 (Abbiategrasso-Cascina Gobba) are covered by the service. For M1, the night bus service is divided into 3 lines and continues to Baggio, well beyond the metro path.

== The future network ==
The metro system is currently expanding. An extension of Line 1 from Sesto 1º Maggio to Cinisello/Monza, towards the city of Cinisello Balsamo, is currently under construction. The track will be 2 kilometres (1.2 mi) long with an intermediate station at Sesto Restellone. The completion has been delayed several times, and is now scheduled for 2027. There is a project for a further 3 km extension of Line 1 to the west into Baggio, a neighbourhood on the eastern border of the municipality.

An extension of Line 2 from Cologno Nord to Vimercate is planned. The section will be 10.8 kilometres (6.7 mi) long with 6 stations (Brugherio, Carugate, Agrate Colleoni, Concorezzo, Vimercate Torri Bianche, Vimercate). The track will be mostly underground (83%).

Line 3 is planned to be extended in some form (by metro or some less expensive means) to the south-east from San Donato to Paullo: 14.8 kilometres (9.2 mi) with intermediate stations in the city of San Donato, Peschiera Borromeo, Mediglia, Caleppio Cerca, Paullo and Paullo East, the first 3 being underground and the other on the surface. The project is currently on hold.

Geographic map of the current network and the lines under construction

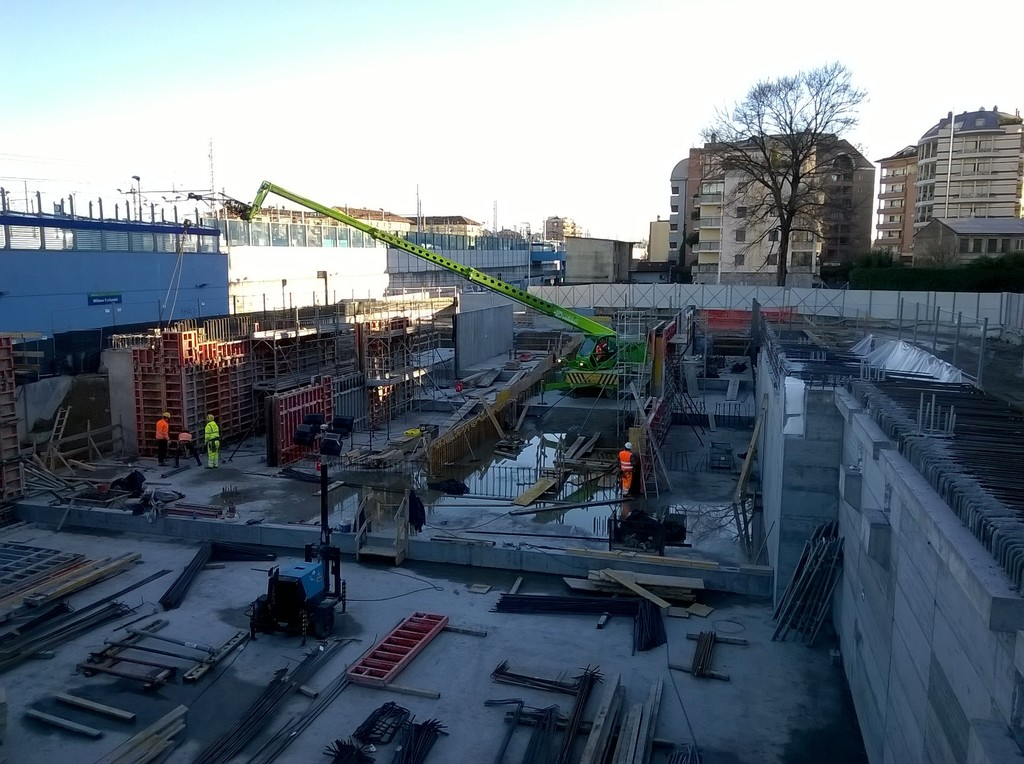
Forlanini FS station on Line 4 under construction in 2016

The last phase of line 4, from the city centre in San Babila to San Cristoforo railway station in the south-west, near the municipal border with Buccinasco and Corsico, opened in October 2024. Further extensions to Segrate train station in the east and to Buccinasco are planned, though not yet under construction.

Line 5 is planned to be extended to Cinisello/Monza, where it will intersect with line 1 a second time at Monza Bettola, and then to Monza city centre and west side.

Milan Metro extensions under construction or planned
Line	Route or station	Phase	Scheduled opening	Length	New stations
Milan Metro Line 1	Sesto 1° Maggio – Cinisello/Monza	Under construction	2031	1.9 km	2
Milan Metro Line 1	Bisceglie – Olmi	Under construction	2030	3 km	3
Milan Metro Line 2	Cologno Nord - Vimercate	Design	–	9.7 km	5
Milan Metro Line 2	Gessate - Trezzo sull'Adda	Design	–	8 km	4
Milan Metro Line 3	San Donato – Peschiera	Approved	–	4 km	2
Milan Metro Line 4	Linate Airport - Segrate	Design	–	2.5 km	2
Milan Metro Line 4	San Cristoforo - Buccinasco	Design	–	1.5 km	1
Milan Metro Line 5	Bignami - Monza Brianza	Approved (expected start of works: 2027)	2034	13.1 km	11
Milan Metro Line 5	San Siro Stadio - Settimo Milanese	Design	–	4.5 km	4

== See also ==
- Signalling of the Milan Metro
- Transport in Milan
- Azienda Trasporti Milanesi
- Milan S Lines
- List of metro systems
- Lists of rapid transit systems
