= San Siro Stadio (Milan Metro) =

Milan metro station

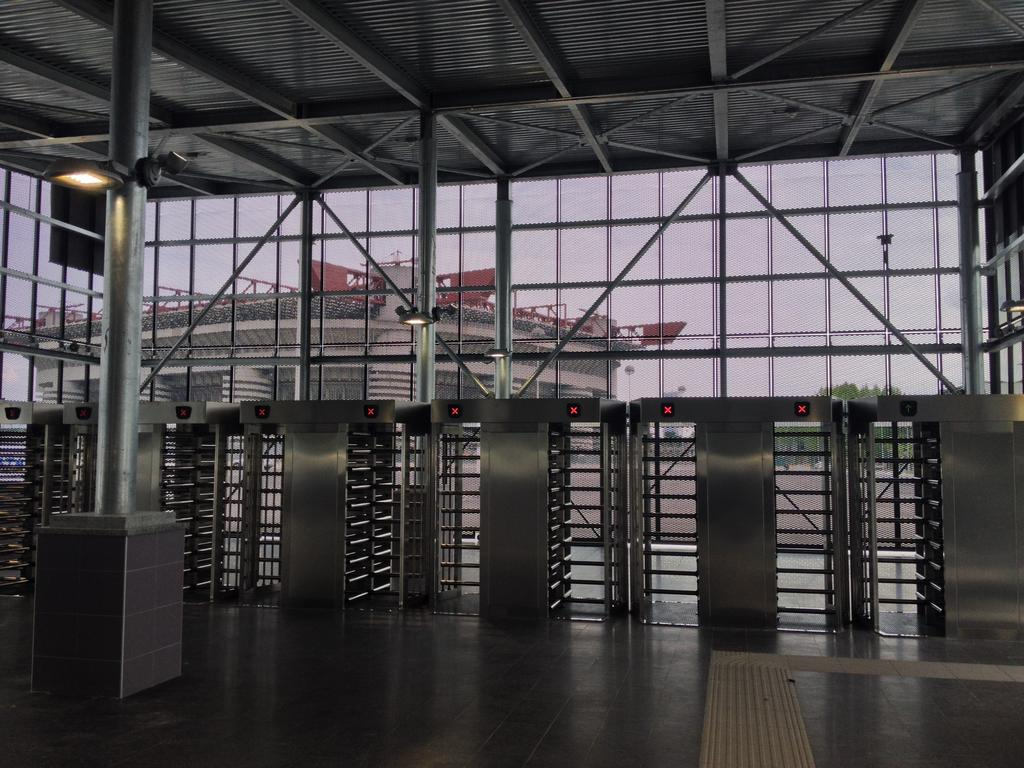

General information
- Coordinates: 45.476228°N 9.118543°E
- Owner: Azienda Trasporti Milanesi
- Platforms: 2
- Tracks: 2

Construction
- Structure type: Underground
- Accessible: yes

Other information
- Fare zone: STIBM: Mi1

History
- Opened: 29 April 2015; 11 years ago

Services
Preceding station	Milan Metro	Following station
San Siro Ippodromo towards Bignami	Line 5	Terminus
Location

San Siro Stadio is the western terminus station of Line 5 of the Milan Metro.

== History ==
The works for the construction of the station began in November 2010, as part of the second section of the line, from Garibaldi FS to San Siro Stadio. This station is one of the two stops of this second section where a tunnel boring machine was used to build the galleries. The station was opened to the public on 29 April 2015, a few days before the official opening of Expo 2015.

== Station structure ==
San Siro Stadio is an underground station with two tracks served by two side platforms and, like all the other stations on Line 5, is wheelchair accessible.

Since this station is situated near San Siro stadium, it was designed to accommodate a high people flow. For this reason, besides the regular exits, there is also a large entrance equipped with full height turnstiles able to regulate the flows coming from the stadium; this will allow the entrance of maximum 500 people every three minutes to avoid overcrowding of platforms after large events at the stadium.

== Interchanges ==
Near this station are located:

- Tram stops (line 16)
- Bus stops
