= Bignami (Milan Metro) =

Milan metro station

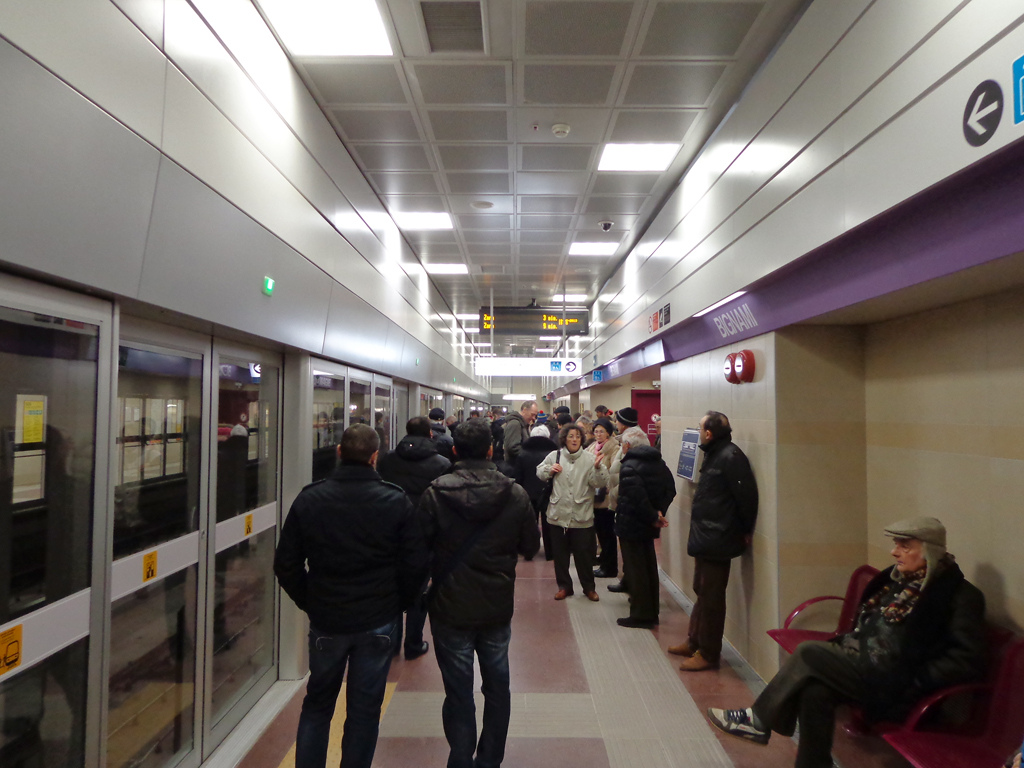

General information
- Coordinates: 45.526389°N 9.211944°E
- Owner: Azienda Trasporti Milanesi
- Platforms: 2
- Tracks: 2

Construction
- Structure type: Underground
- Accessible: yes

Other information
- Fare zone: STIBM: Mi1

History
- Opened: 10 February 2013; 13 years ago

Services
Preceding station	Milan Metro	Following station
Terminus	Line 5	Ponale towards San Siro Stadio
Location

Bignami is the northern terminus station of Line 5 of the Milan Metro. The station is located at the intersection of Viale Fulvio Testi and Via Emilio Bignami, near the border with Sesto San Giovanni.

Like the adjacent street, it commemorates Emilio Bignami, a 19th-century engineer who pioneered modern water and sewage services for the city of Milan.
