= Vimodrone (Milan Metro) =

Milan metro station

Coordinates: 45.5157°N 9.2861°E

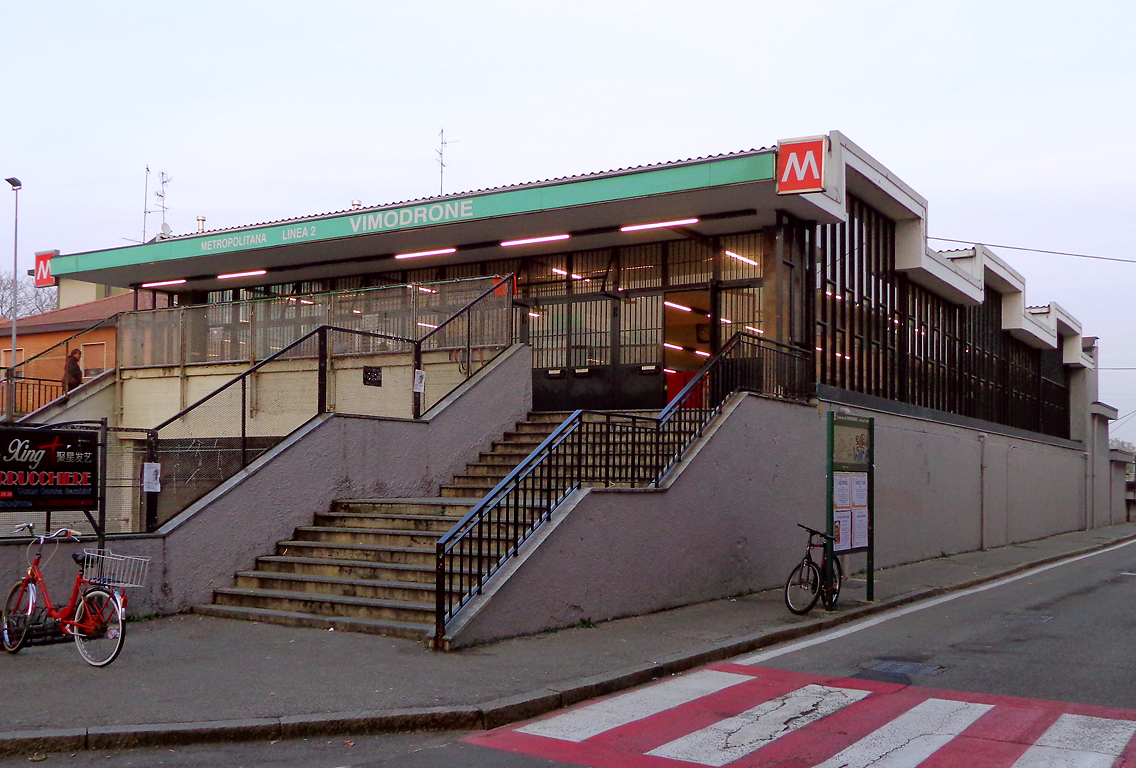

General information
- Location: Vimodrone; Italy
- Owner: Azienda Trasporti Milanesi
- Platforms: 2
- Tracks: 2

Construction
- Structure type: At grade

Other information
- Fare zone: STIBM: Mi3

History
- Opened: 5 May 1968; 58 years ago as tramway stop 4 December 1972; 53 years ago as metro station

Services
Preceding station	Milan Metro	Following station
Cascina Gobba towards Assago or Abbiategrasso	Line 2	Cascina Burrona towards Gessate
Location

Vimodrone is a suburban station on Line 2 of the Milan Metro in the municipality of Vimodrone.

== History ==
The station was opened in 1968, and initially was a stop on the Milan-Gorgonzola fast tramway line. Since 4 December 1972 the section from Cascina Gobba to Gorgonzola, where this station is located, was connected to Milan Metro Line 2 and has operated as part of it ever since.

== Station structure ==
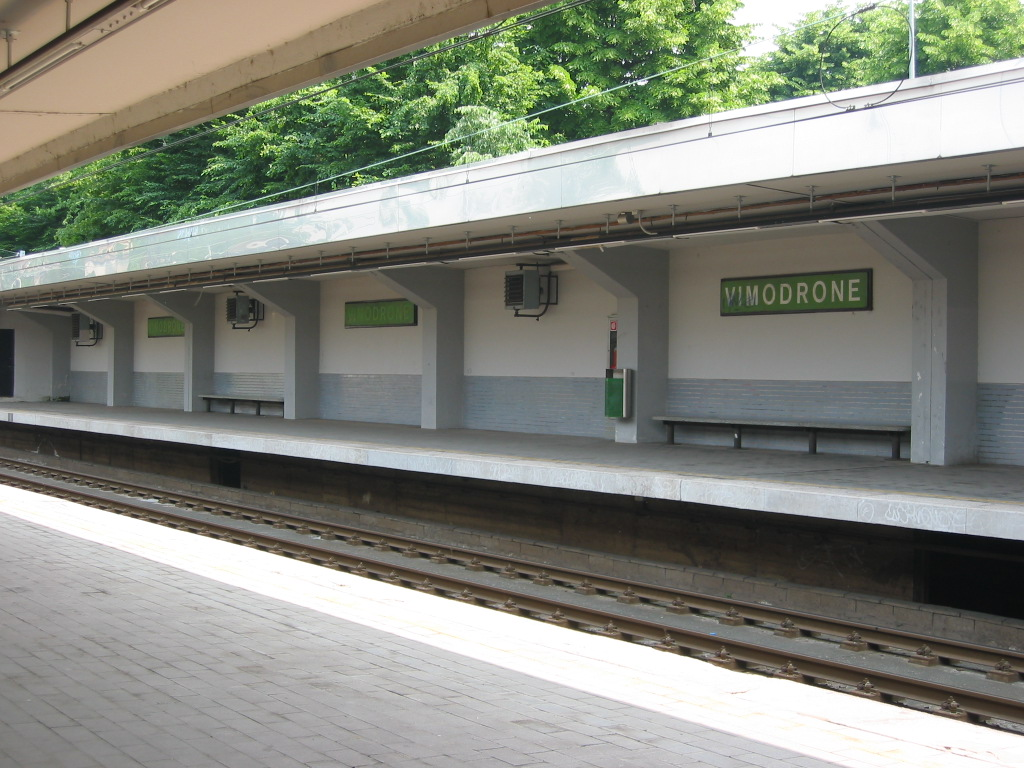
Platform view

The station has two covered platforms and two tracks. The passenger building is located on either side of the tracks, at the western end of the platforms. The station is built in the trench of an old bed of the Naviglio Martesana channel, diverted approximately 200 meters to the north.

== Bibliography ==
- Renzo Marini, Le ferrovie dell'Adda, in "Ingegneria Ferroviaria", Apr 1968, pp. 345–348.
- Giovanni Cornolò, Fuori porta in tram. Le tranvie extraurbane milanesi, Parma, Ermanno Arbertelli, 1980.
