= Cernusco sul Naviglio (Milan Metro) =

Milan metro station

Coordinates: 45.5211°N 9.3309°E

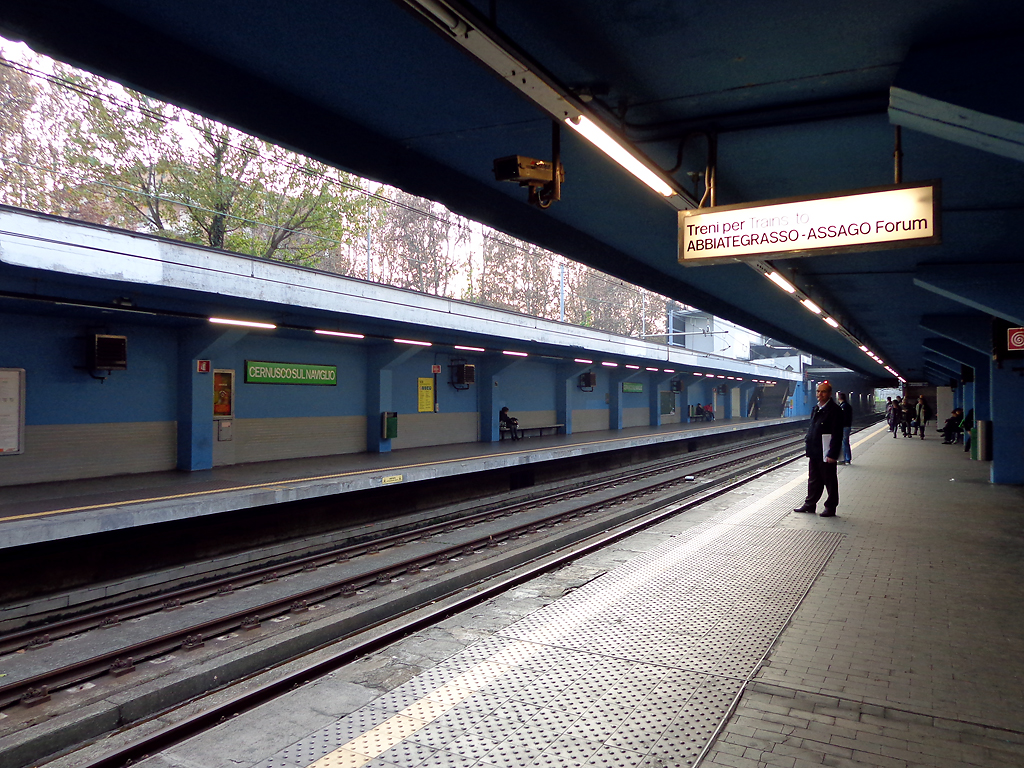

General information
- Location: Cernusco sul Naviglio; Italy
- Owner: Azienda Trasporti Milanesi
- Platforms: 2
- Tracks: 2

Construction
- Structure type: At grade
- Accessible: y

Other information
- Fare zone: STIBM: Mi4

History
- Opened: 5 May 1968; 58 years ago as tramway stop 4 December 1972; 53 years ago as metro station

Services
Preceding station	Milan Metro	Following station
Cascina Burrona towards Assago or Abbiategrasso	Line 2	Villa Fiorita towards Gessate
Location

Cernusco sul Naviglio is a suburban station on Line 2 of the Milan Metro in the municipality of the same name.

== History ==
The station was opened in 1968, as a stop on the Milan-Gorgonzola fast tramway line. Since 4 December 1972 the section from Cascina Gobba to Gorgonzola, where this station is located, was connected to Milan Metro Line 2 and has operated as part of it ever since.

== Station structure ==
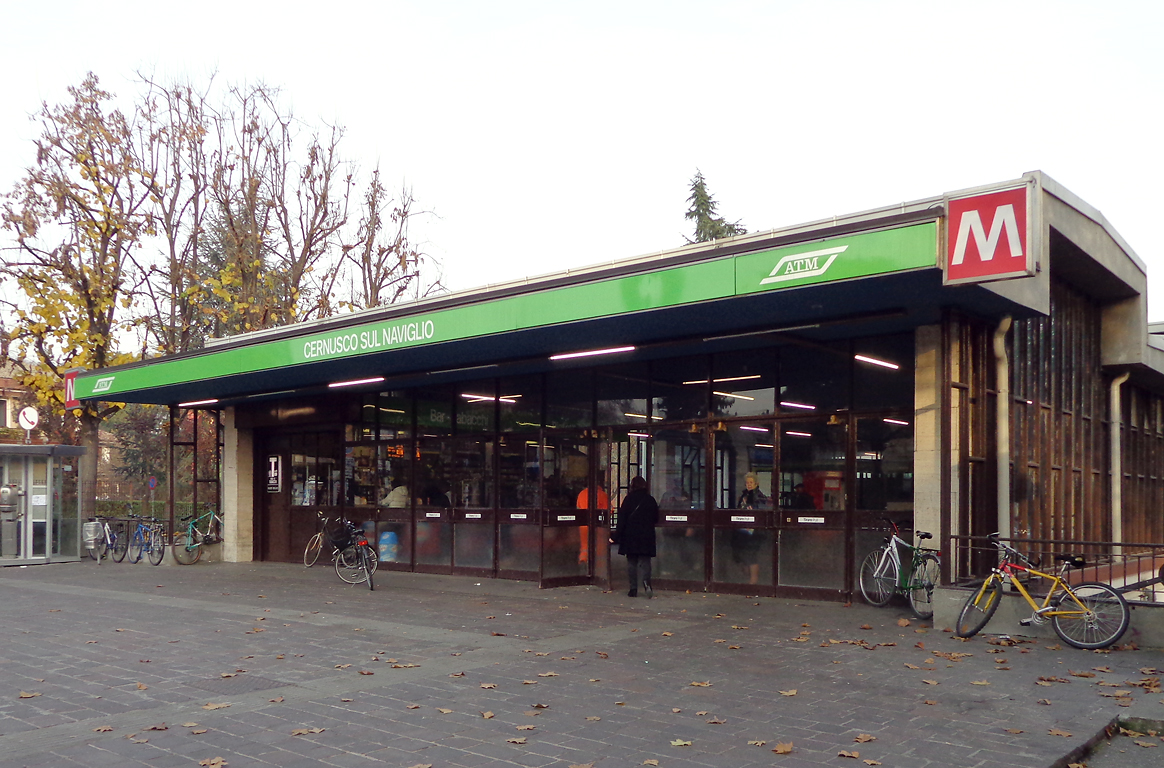
Station entrance

The station is a surface station with two tracks and two side platforms. It is located on viale Assunta, within the municipality of Cernusco sul Naviglio.

== Bibliography ==
- Giovanni Cornolò, Fuori porta in tram. Le tranvie extraurbane milanesi, Parma, Ermanno Arbertelli, 1980.
