= Cassina de' Pecchi (Milan Metro) =

Milan metro station

Coordinates: 45.5218°N 9.3632°E

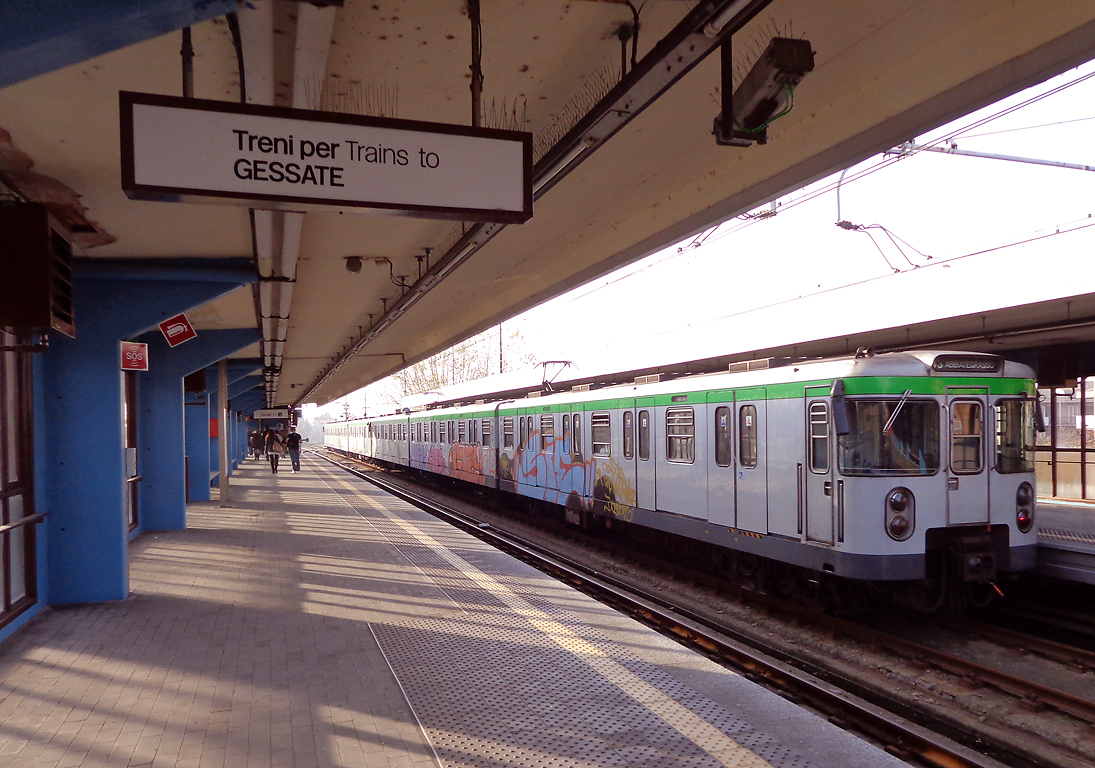

General information
- Location: Cassina de' Pecchi; Italy
- Owner: Azienda Trasporti Milanesi
- Platforms: 2
- Tracks: 2

Construction
- Structure type: Elevated

Other information
- Fare zone: STIBM: Mi4

History
- Opened: 5 May 1968; 58 years ago as tramway stop 4 December 1972; 53 years ago as metro station

Services
Preceding station	Milan Metro	Following station
Villa Fiorita towards Assago or Abbiategrasso	Line 2	Bussero towards Gessate
Location

Cassina de' Pecchi is a suburban station on Line 2 of the Milan Metro in the municipality of the same name.

== History ==
The station was opened in 1968, as a stop on the Milan-Gorgonzola fast tramway line. Since 4 December 1972 the section from Cascina Gobba to Gorgonzola, where this station is located, was connected to Milan Metro Line 2 and operates as part of it ever since.

== Station structure ==
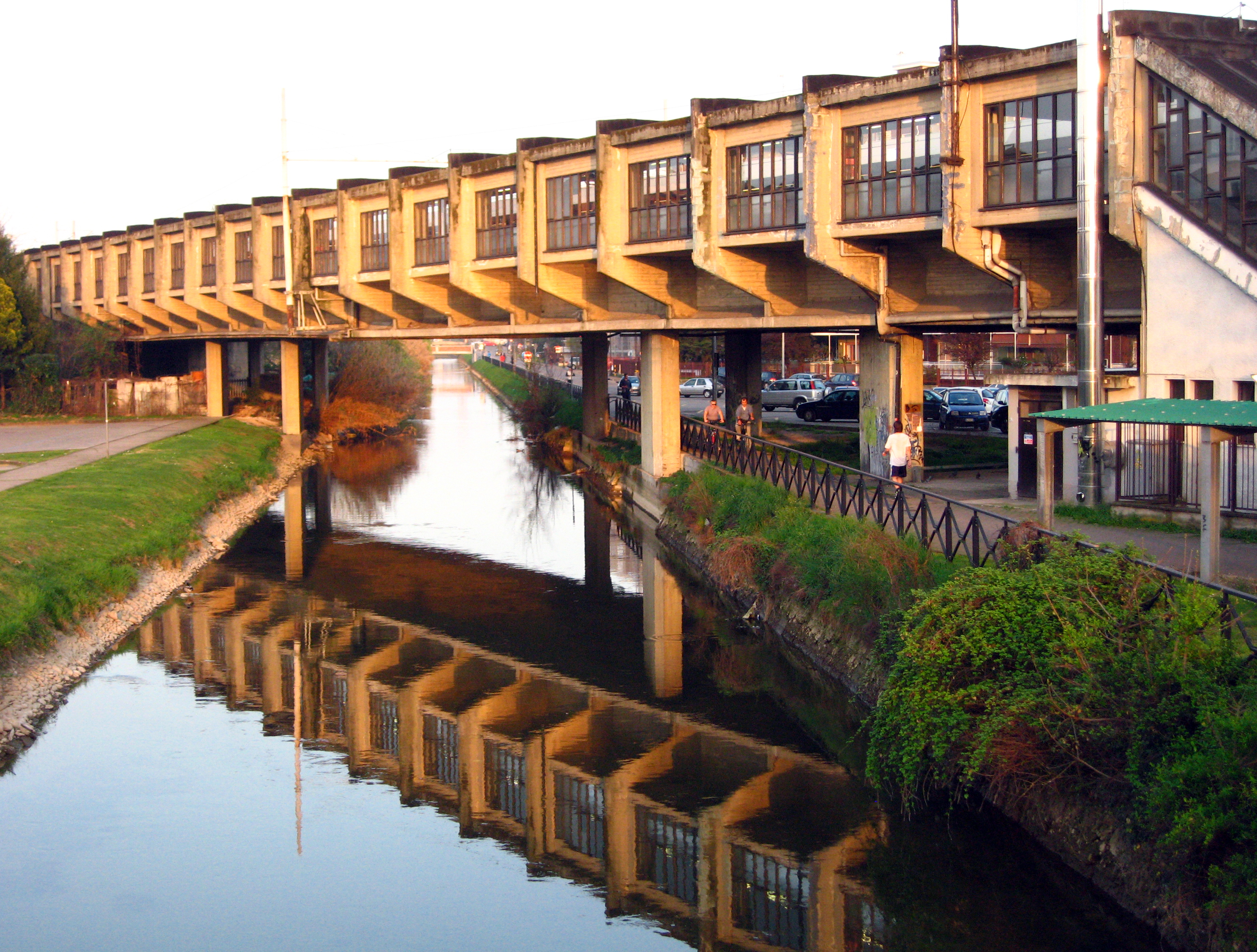
Elevated structure

The station has two covered platforms and two tracks. It is located on the approximately 144 meters long viaduct across the Martesana channel. The viaduct was designed by engineer Silvano Zorzi. The passenger building is located in a sort of mezzanine integrated into the structure, under the tracks at the western end of the platforms.

== Bibliography ==
- Giovanni Cornolò, Fuori porta in tram. Le tranvie extraurbane milanesi, Parma, Ermanno Arbertelli, 1980.
- Elio Ceron, Sergio Farné, La progettazione e la costruzione delle Linee Celeri dell'Adda, in "Ingegneria Ferroviaria", novembre 1995, pp. 1001–1022.
