= Bussero (Milan Metro) =

Milan metro station

Coordinates: 45.5252°N 9.3759°E

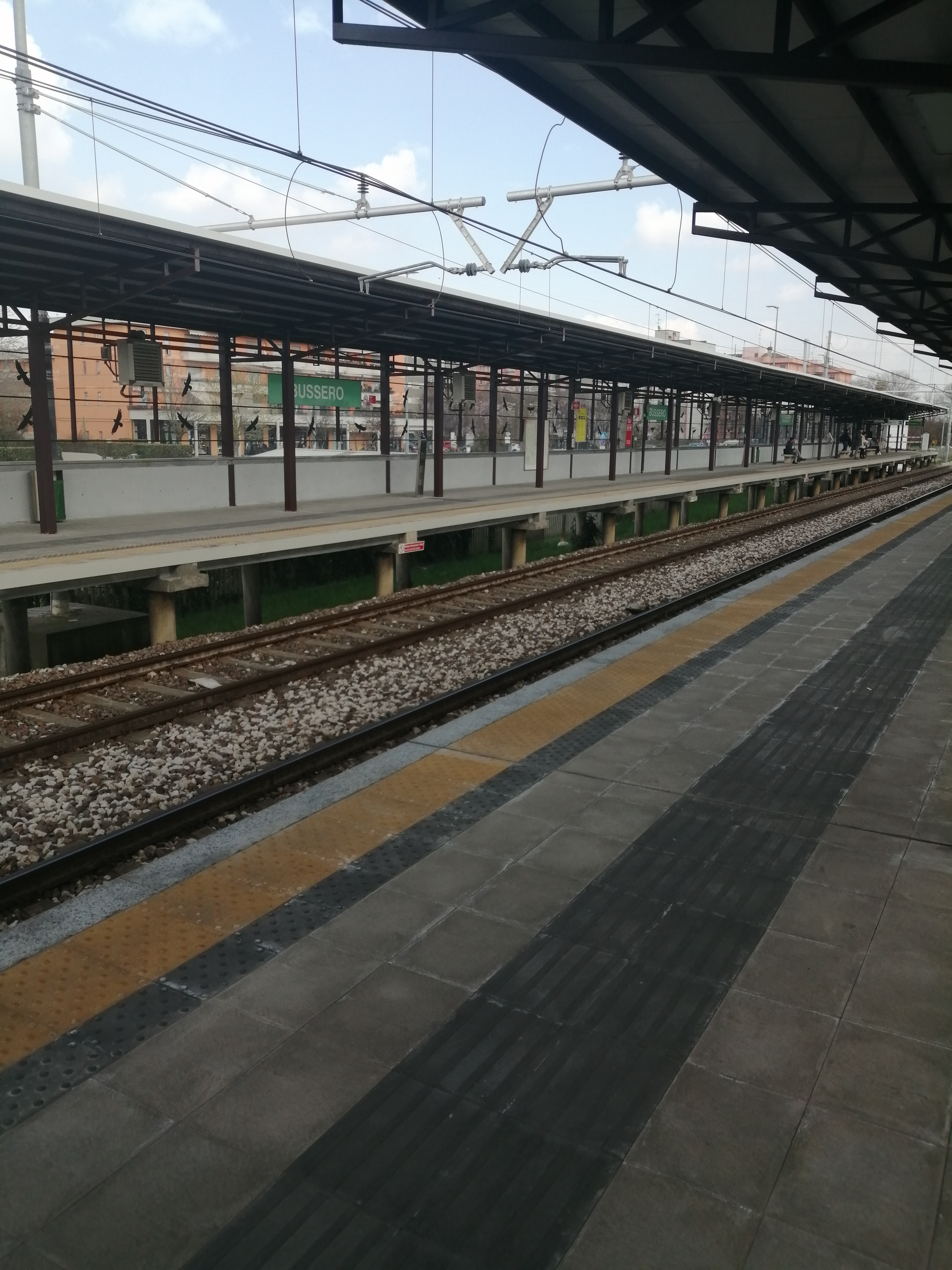

General information
- Location: Bussero; Italy
- Owner: Azienda Trasporti Milanesi
- Platforms: 2
- Tracks: 2

Construction
- Structure type: At grade
- Parking: 290 lots
- Cycle facilities: 96 lots

Other information
- Fare zone: STIBM: Mi4

History
- Opened: 5 May 1968; 58 years ago as tramway stop 4 December 1972; 53 years ago as metro station

Services
Preceding station	Milan Metro	Following station
Cassina de' Pecchi towards Assago or Abbiategrasso	Line 2	Villa Pompea towards Gessate
Location

Bussero is a suburban station on Line 2 of the Milan Metro in the municipality of the same name.

== History ==
The station was opened in 1968, as a stop on the Milan-Gorgonzola fast tramway line. It was one of four stations not included in the original project (together with Cascina Burrona, Villa Fiorita and Villa Pompea). Since 4 December 1972 the section from Cascina Gobba to Gorgonzola, where this station is located, was connected to Milan Metro Line 2 and operates as part of it ever since.

== Station structure ==
The station has two concrete platforms, covered with translucent panels, and two tracks. The passenger building is located at the northern end of the platforms. The station is built entirely of prefabricated elements and its structure is similar to that of the stations of Cascina Burrona, Villa Fiorita and Villa Pompea, constructed at the same time.

== Bibliography ==
- Giovanni Cornolò, Fuori porta in tram. Le tranvie extraurbane milanesi, Parma, Ermanno Arbertelli, 1980.
- Elio Ceron, Sergio Farné, La progettazione e la costruzione delle Linee Celeri dell'Adda, in "Ingegneria Ferroviaria", novembre 1995, pp. 1001–1022.
