= Romolo (Milan Metro) =

Milan metro station

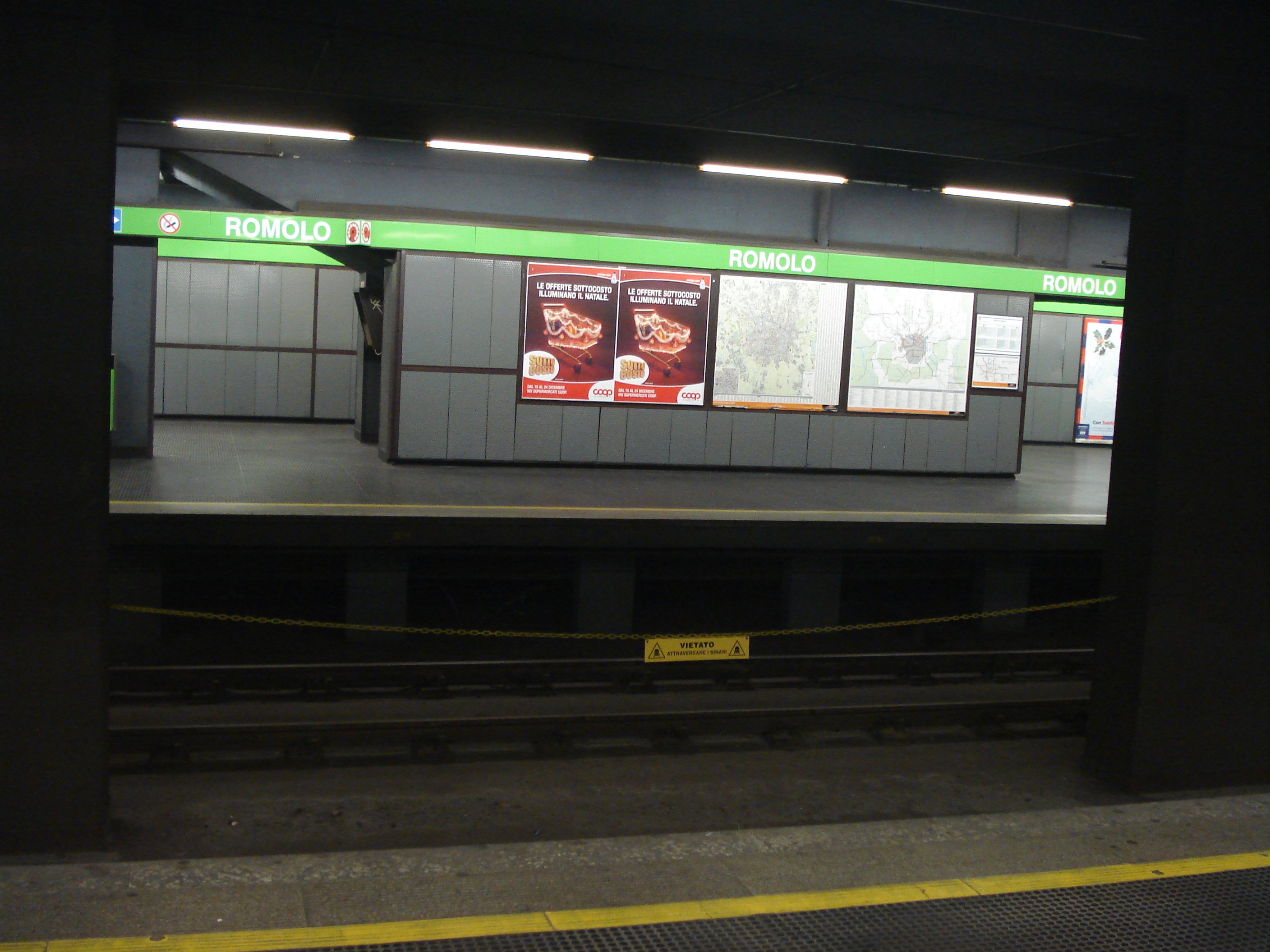

General information
- Location: Viale Romolo, Milan; Italy
- Coordinates: 45°26′39″N 9°10′03″E
- Owner: Azienda Trasporti Milanesi
- Platforms: 2
- Tracks: 2

Construction
- Structure type: Underground
- Parking: 262 spaces
- Accessible: Yes

Other information
- Fare zone: STIBM: Mi1

History
- Opened: 13 April 1985; 41 years ago

Services
Preceding station	Milan Metro	Following station
Famagosta towards Assago or Abbiategrasso	Line 2	Porta Genova towards Cologno Nord or Gessate
Location

Romolo is a station on Line 2 of the Milan Metro. The station is located between Viale Romolo and Largo Alberto Ascari. It is connected to the railway station of the same name. It was opened on 3 April 1985 as a one-station extension from Porta Genova.

== Nearby landmarks ==
- IULM University of Milan
- NABA – Nuova Accademia di Belle Arti Milano
