= Assago Milanofiori Nord (Milan Metro) =

Milan metro station

Milanofiori Nord
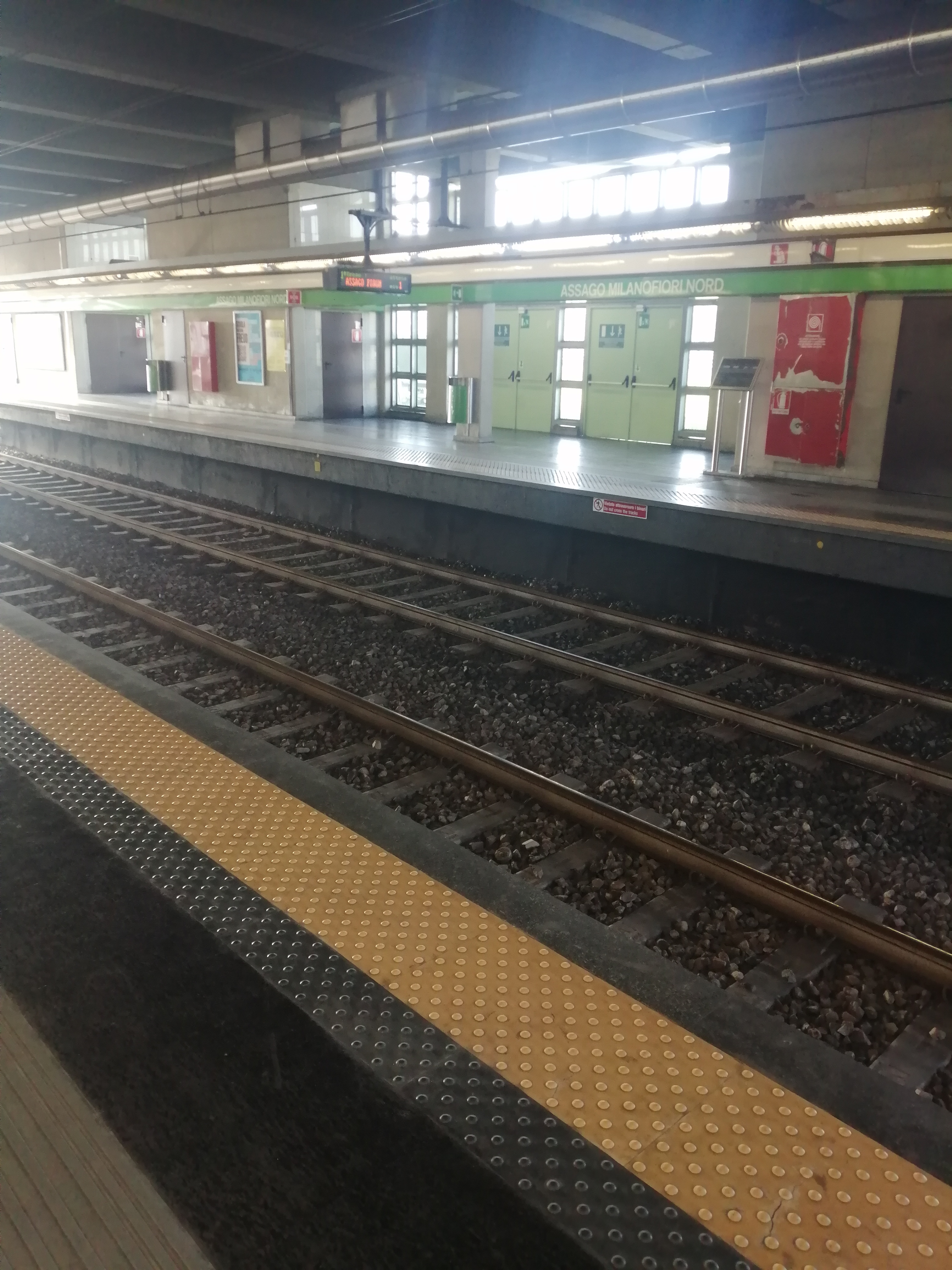

General information
- Location: Assago; Italy
- Coordinates: 45°24′34″N 9°09′00″E
- Owner: Azienda Trasporti Milanesi

Construction
- Structure type: Surface
- Accessible: Yes

Other information
- Fare zone: STIBM: Mi3

History
- Opened: 20 February 2011

Services
Preceding station	Milan Metro	Following station
Milanofiori Forum Terminus	Line 2	Famagosta towards Cologno Nord or Gessate
Location

Milanofiori Nord is a station on Line 2 of the Milan Metro, in the southern suburb of Assago. The line here runs beside Autostrada A7. The station was opened on 20 February 2011 as part of an extension from Famagosta to Assago Milanofiori Forum.
