= Cascina Antonietta (Milan Metro) =

Milan metro station

Coordinates: 45.5421°N 9.4235°E

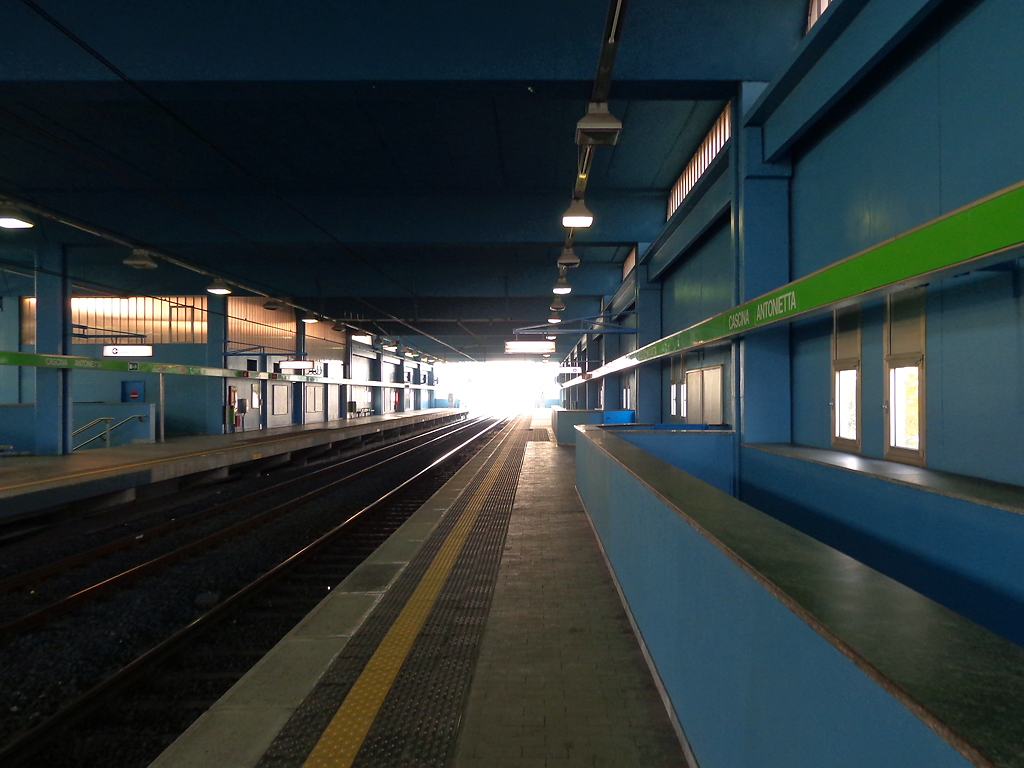

General information
- Location: Gorgonzola, Milan; Italy
- Owner: Azienda Trasporti Milanesi
- Platforms: 2
- Tracks: 2

Construction
- Structure type: At grade

Other information
- Fare zone: STIBM: Mi5

History
- Opened: 13 April 1985; 41 years ago

Services
Preceding station	Milan Metro	Following station
Gorgonzola towards Assago or Abbiategrasso	Line 2	Gessate Terminus
Location

Cascina Antonietta is a station on Line 2 of the Milan Metro in the village of Cascina Antonietta, a suburb of Gorgonzola. It is the station with the lowest number of passengers in the system, with an average of 600 passengers per day in 2018.

== History ==
The station was opened 13 April 1985, as part of the extension from Gorgonzola to Gessate.

== Station structure ==
It is a surface station with two platforms and two tracks.
