= Famagosta (Milan Metro) =

Station on the Milan Metro in Italy

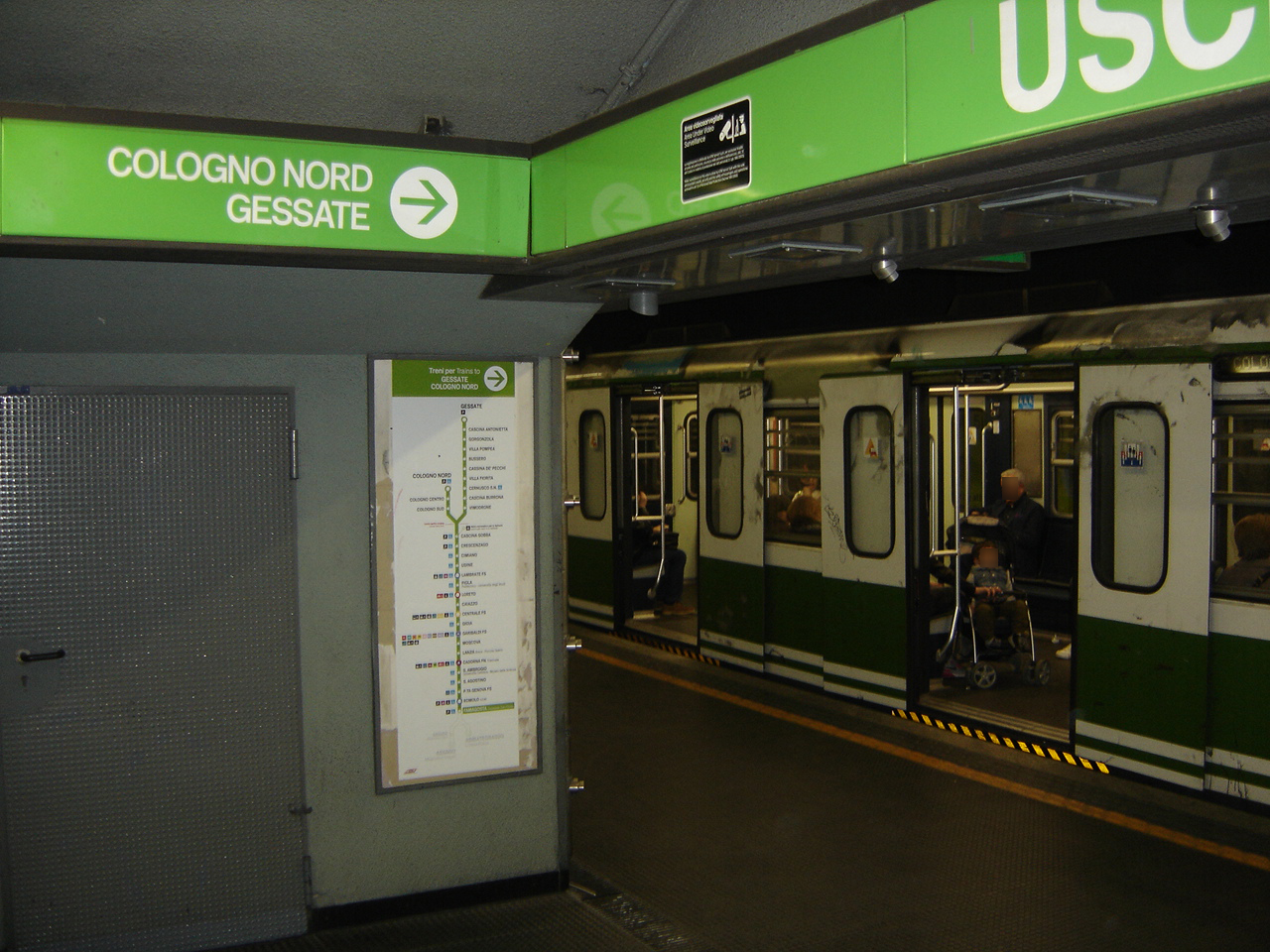

General information
- Location: Viale Famagosta, Milan; Italy
- Coordinates: 45°26′16″N 9°10′07″E
- Owner: Azienda Trasporti Milanesi
- Platforms: 1
- Tracks: 2

Construction
- Structure type: Underground
- Accessible: Yes

Other information
- Fare zone: STIBM: Mi1

History
- Opened: 1 November 1994; 32 years ago

Services
Preceding station	Milan Metro	Following station
Piazza Abbiategrasso towards Assago or Abbiategrasso	Line 2 Piazza Abbiategrasso	Romolo towards Cologno Nord or Gessate
Milanofiori Nord towards Milanofiori Forum	Line 2	Romolo towards Cologno Nord or Gessate
Location

Famagosta is a station on Line 2 of the Milan Metro. It is located on Viale Famagosta. The station was opened on 1 November 1994 as a one-station extension from Romolo.

South of the station, the line branches off, with trains continuing to either Piazza Abbiategrasso or Assago Milanofiori Forum.
