= Gorgonzola (disambiguation) =

Gorgonzola is an Italian blue cheese.

Gorgonzola may also refer to:

- Gorgonzola, Milan, a town in the Metropolitan City of Milan, Italy
- Gorgonzola (Milan Metro), a station on the Milan Metro
