= Gioia Ghezzi =

Italian businesswoman

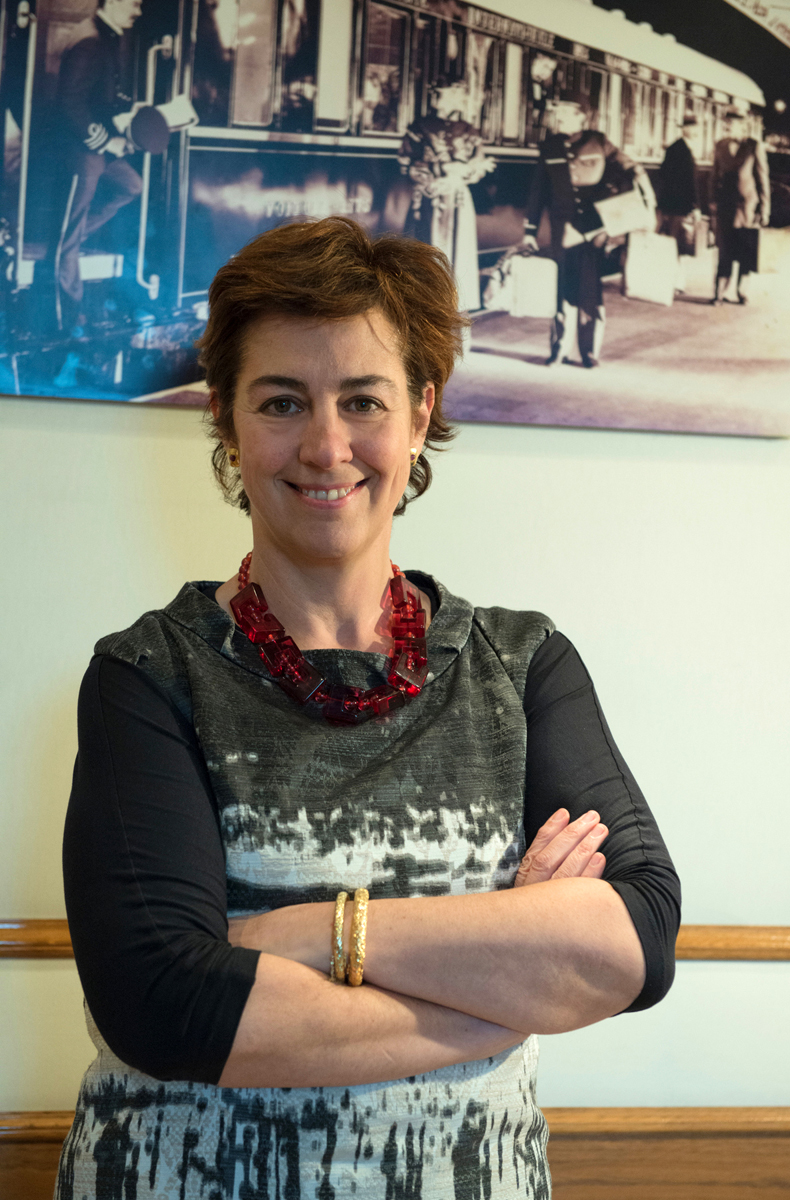
Gioia Ghezzi

Gioia Ghezzi (born 12 January 1962, in Milan) is an Italian businesswoman, president of Ferrovie dello Stato Italiane between December 2015 and July 2018, president of Azienda Trasporti Milanesi since April 2020 and president of the European Institute of Technology since June 2020.

== Early life and education ==
Ghezzi graduated in Theoretical Physics from Milan University, before taking a Master's degree in Business Administration with a focus on Finance from London Business School. In 2004, she gave birth to her only daughter, Laura Ghezzi, who is a student at Liceo Manzoni Milano.

== Career ==
Ghezzi began her career as a system engineer at the IBM European Research Centre in Rome and the IBM Italian Research Centre in Milan. From 1995 to 2001, she was Executive Editor and international manager of the Hard Sciences Business Unit at Harcourt General - Academic Press.

Ghezzi continued her career working from 2001 to 2012 at McKinsey & Company, and in 2013 as CEO of the International Group Risk Solutions at the Zurich Insurance Group.

From April 2012 to February 2013, Ghezzi was Chief Operating Officer at Willis Group Holding.

In December 2015, Ghezzi was appointed President of Ferrovie dello Stato Italiane. She held the position till July 2018.

In September 2016, at Tiburtina railway station in Rome, Ghezzi presented the 2016–2027 Business Plan together with Renato Mazzoncini, CEO and General Director of Ferrovie dello Stato Italiane. She gave the opening speech and stated that "the new business plan for Ferrovie dello Stato is an ‘extremely innovative’ plan that aims to transform the company from a ‘group that offers rail transport to a supplier of integrated mobility services’".

In April 2020, Ghezzi was named president of Azienda Trasporti Milanesi.

== Other activities ==
- Atlantia, Independent Member of the Board of Directors
- RGI Group, Chairwoman of the Board of Directors
- Creditor Fondiario, Member of the Board of Directors (since 2018)
- Trilateral Commission, Member of the European Group
