= BikeMi =

Bicycle-sharing system in Milan, Italy

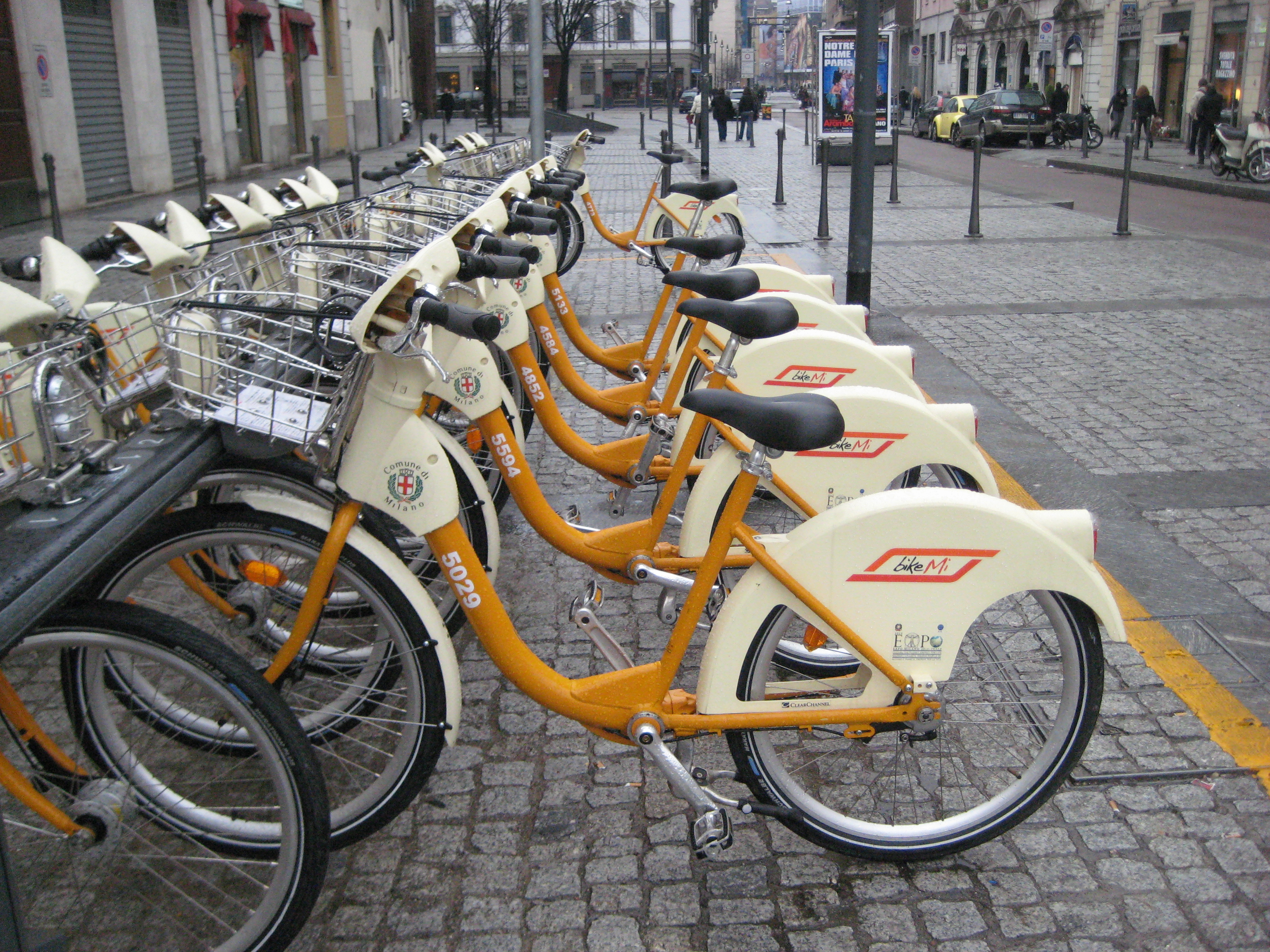
- BikeMi station and bikes along Corso Garibaldi

Overview
- Locale: Milan, Italy
- Transit type: Bicycle-sharing system
- Number of stations: 325
- Daily ridership: 15,890 (2013 average)
- Website: bikemi.com

Operation
- Began operation: 3 December 2008; 17 years ago
- Operators: Clear Channel, ATM
- Number of vehicles: 5,430

BikeMi is a public bicycle sharing system in Milan, Italy. It was launched on 8 December 2008 and is operated by Clear Channel under its SmartBike system. The scheme encompasses 4,650 bicycles (including 1,000 electric bicycles and bikes for children) and 325 stations.

== Service ==
The service is active daily from 6 AM to 2 AM and had a ridership of about 15,890 per day in 2013. The operating hours are sometimes extended for special events.

== Rates ==
The system is based on 1-day, 1-week or 1-year subscriptions, which allows users to rent a bike. Rentals are free for the first 30 minutes (3 for electric bikes). After that time, in order not to pay more, the bike has to be returned in a station. However, unlimited number of rentals are allowed in a day. The scheme is similar to the Vélib' one. As of November 2015 there are 43,213 users with an annual subscription.

Prices range from €4.50 for a 1-day subscription to €36 for the annual one. An additional rental fee is charged, which varies depending on whether a pedal-powered or electric bike is used.

Electric bikes are free for the first 3 minutes. A €0.25 per half hour fee is then charged. This fee doubles every half hour, until 2 hours, where a fixed fee of €4.00 per hour is paid.

Pedal powered bikes are free for the first 30 minutes. A €0.50 per half hour fee is then charged rentals not exceeding 2 hours. After this, the rate rises to €2.00 per hour.

== See also ==
- List of bicycle-sharing systems
