= Milan Metro Line 2 =

Metro line in Milan, Italy

M2

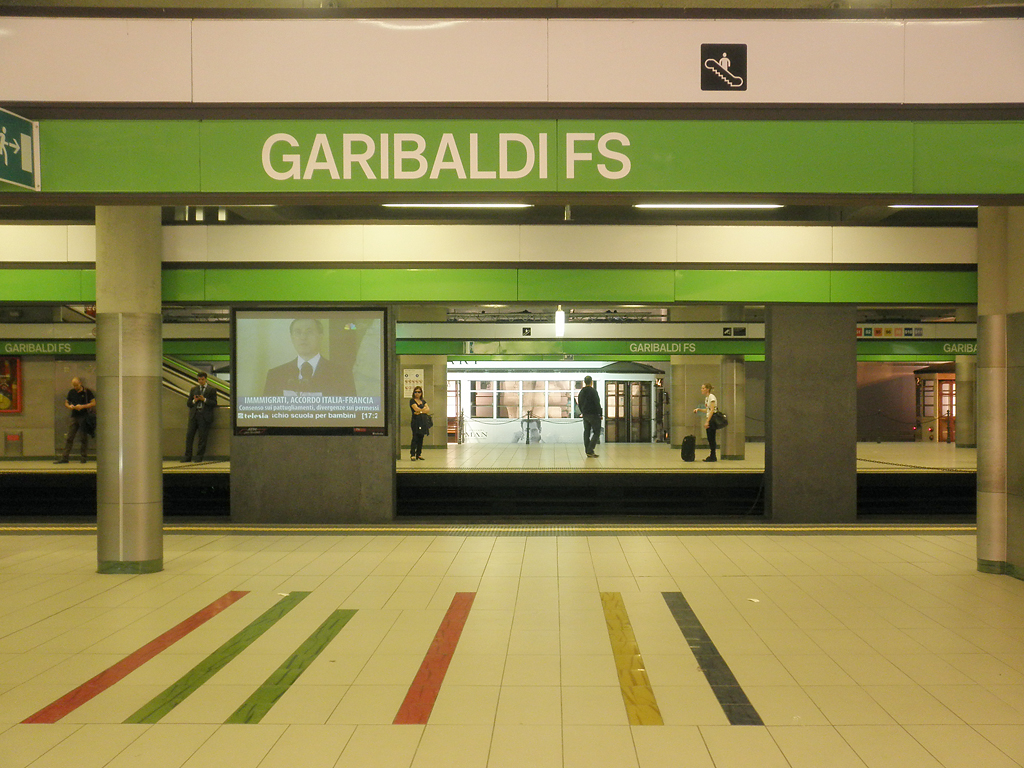
- Garibaldi FS station

Overview
- Status: operational
- Line number: 2
- Locale: Milan, Italy
- Termini: Piazza Abbiategrasso Assago Milanofiori Forum; Gessate Cologno Nord
- Stations: 35

Service
- Type: Rapid transit
- System: Milan Metro
- Operator: Azienda Trasporti Milanesi
- Rolling stock: AnsaldoBreda Meneghino; AnsaldoBreda Leonardo
- Daily ridership: 360,000 (2012)

History
- Opened: 27 September 1969; 56 years ago
- Last extension: 2011

Technical
- Line length: 39.4 km (24.5 mi)
- Track gauge: 1,435 mm (4 ft 8 1/2 in) standard gauge
- Electrification: Overhead line, 1,500 V DC
Route map

Line 2 is a subway line serving Milan, Italy, operated by ATM as part of the Milan Metro. It is also called the Green Line (Linea Verde in Italian), as it is visually identified by green signs.

The line runs from the southern to the north-eastern neighborhoods passing through the city centre, serving the north-eastern metropolitan area with two different branches. The line is 39.4 km (24.5 mi) long and has 35 stations. Line 2 is the longest line of the Milan Metro and is the only one running partially overground. The branch to Cologno Nord runs mostly on viaducts, while those to Assago and Gessate run on the surface.

The line has the southernmost and easternmost stations on the network (Assago Forum and Gessate).

== History ==
Opening poster for the new line.

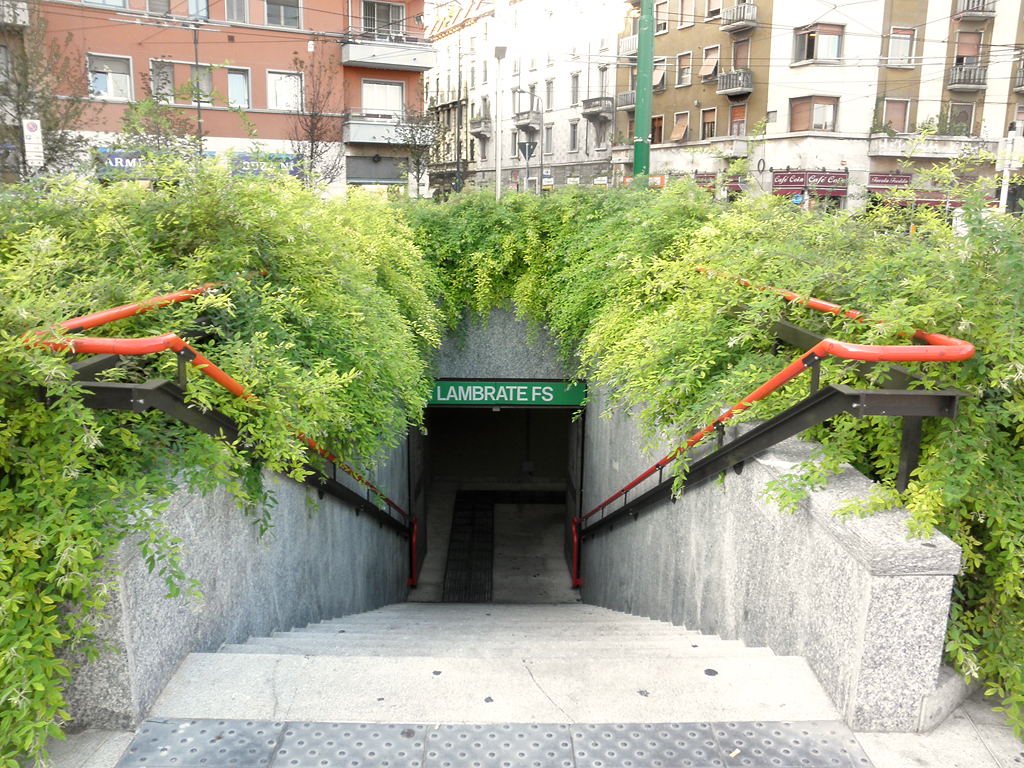
The Lambrate FS station entrance.

The first part of the line, from Caiazzo to Cascina Gobba, was opened in September 1969.

The interurban sections of Line 2 were originally built as part of a fast tramway, the Linee celeri dell'Adda ("Adda fast lines"), opened in 1968 from Cimiano up to Gorgonzola. After a few years, in 1972, the section was included in the newly born Metro line. The same section was extended in 1985 up to Gessate, the present terminus.

== Route ==
The line, 40.4 kilometres (25.1 mi) long with 35 stations, has a central section that runs from Cascina Gobba to Famagosta, and forks at both ends. The North branch runs from Cologno Sud to Cologno Nord, the North-East branch runs from Vimodrone to Gessate, the South-East branch consists of the Abbiategrasso station, the South branch runs from Assago Milanofiori Nord to Assago Milanofiori Forum.

Station Name	Transfer	Grade	Branch	Opening
Gessate		Above ground	Gessate branch	13 April 1985
Cascina Antonietta		Above ground	Gessate branch	13 April 1985
Gorgonzola		Above ground	Gessate branch	4 December 1972
Villa Pompea		Above ground	Gessate branch	4 December 1972
Bussero		Above ground	Gessate branch	4 December 1972
Cassina de' Pecchi		Above ground	Gessate branch	4 December 1972
Villa Fiorita		Above ground	Gessate branch	4 December 1972
Cernusco sul Naviglio		Above ground	Gessate branch	4 December 1972
Cascina Burrona		Above ground	Gessate branch	4 December 1972
Vimodrone		Above ground	Gessate branch	4 December 1972
Cologno Nord		Above ground	Cologno Nord branch	7 June 1981
Cologno Centro		Above ground	Cologno Nord branch	7 June 1981
Cologno Sud		Above ground	Cologno Nord branch	7 June 1981
Cascina Gobba		Above ground	Main route	27 September 1969
Crescenzago		Above ground	Main route	27 September 1969
Cimiano		Above ground	Main route	27 September 1969
Udine		Underground	Main route	27 September 1969
Lambrate FS	Line S9 (Milan suburban railway service)	Underground	Main route	27 September 1969
Piola		Underground	Main route	27 September 1969
Loreto	Milan Metro Line 1	Underground	Main route	27 September 1969
Caiazzo		Underground	Main route	27 September 1969
Centrale FS	Milan Metro Line 3	Underground	Main route	27 April 1970
Gioia		Underground	Main route	12 July 1971
Garibaldi FS	Milan Metro Line 5 Line S1 (Milan suburban railway service) Line S2 (Milan suburban railway service) Line S5 (Milan suburban railway service) Line S6 (Milan suburban railway service) Line S7 (Milan suburban railway service) Line S8 (Milan suburban railway service) Line S11 (Milan suburban railway service) Line S12 (Milan suburban railway service) Line S13 (Milan suburban railway service)	Underground	Main route	12 July 1971
Moscova		Underground	Main route	3 March 1978
Lanza		Underground	Main route	3 March 1978
Cadorna FN	Milan Metro Line 1 Line S3 (Milan suburban railway service) Line S4 (Milan suburban railway service)	Underground	Main route	3 March 1978
Sant'Ambrogio	Milan Metro Line 4	Underground	Main route	30 October 1983
Sant'Agostino		Underground	Main route	30 October 1983
Porta Genova		Underground	Main route	30 October 1983
Romolo	Line S9 (Milan suburban railway service) Line S19 (Milan suburban railway service)	Underground	Main route	13 April 1985
Famagosta		Underground	Main route	1 November 1994
Piazza Abbiategrasso		Underground	Piazza Abbiategrasso branch	17 March 2005
Assago Milanofiori Nord		Above ground	Assago Milanofiori Forum branch	20 February 2011
Assago Milanofiori Forum		Above ground	Assago Milanofiori Forum branch	20 February 2011

== Rolling stock ==
There are 2 types of trains in service on the line. The first type is the ET245, which was introduced in 1969 with the opening of the line and was the first train operated on Line 2. ET245 are formed by three-car consists, with Bo-Bo powered units at both ends and a car between them; normally, two consists are coupled to form a single train. This series came in two different versions for urban and suburban routes. The first had 8 doors per car and regular seats, while the latter was equipped with only 6 doors per car and more seats. Original ET245 trains are still in service on the line. Of these, some have been renewed in latest years.

The second type in operation is the new AnsaldoBreda Meneghino train. The first train was introduced in April 2009. In 2015, the 3000 Series "Leonardo" followed, with the two newer series jointly replacing all the other stock, which is due to be retired by 2020.

Originally, as its own trains were not ready yet, Line 2 provisionally operated with 100/200 Series trains transferred from Line 1. As the 300/400 Series trains were delivered starting from 1970, the 100/200 Series trains were moved back to line 1. The three-doors 300/400 Series trains were manufactured between 1970 and 1981, and in 1985 the 350 Series was introduced, which was an improved version of the earlier 300 Series with four doors instead of three. 350 Series trains were produced in 2 batches between 1985 and 1991. In 1987 the 500 Series was introduced, consisting of three experimental trains designed to test the new GTO–VVVF inverters that were to equip Line 3's 8000 Series.

== Planned extensions ==
An extension on the north from Cologno to Vimercate is planned.

== Bibliography ==
- Giorgio Meregalli: Gli impianti ferroviari della linea 2 della metropolitana di Milano. In: ″Ingegneria Ferroviaria″, May 1971, p. 469–492.
