= Vimodrone =

- Comune
- Comune di Vimodrone
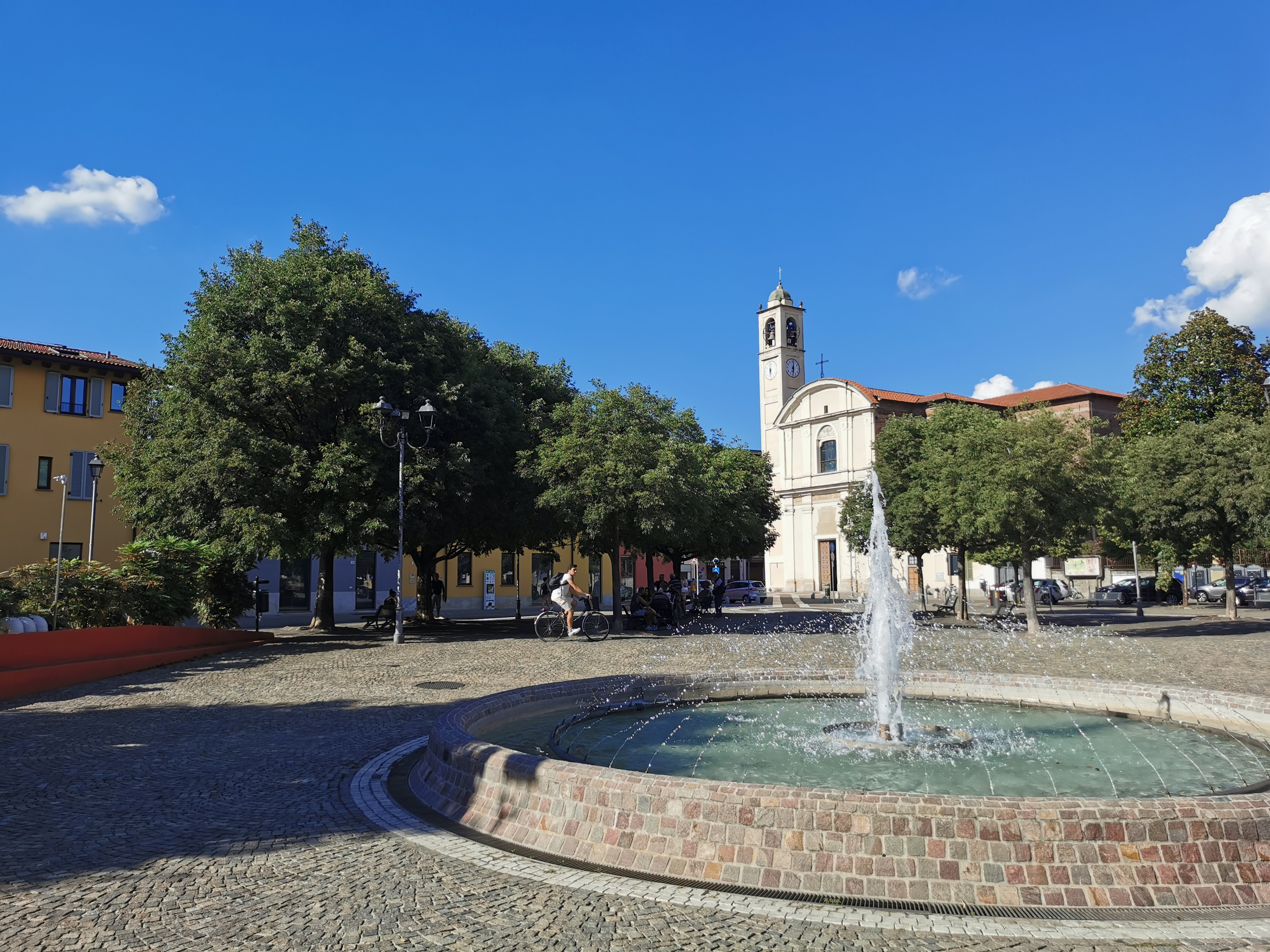

- Location within Italy Location within Lombardy
- Coordinates: 45°30′N 9°16′E
- Country: Italy
- Region: Lombardy
- Metropolitan city: Milan (MI)
- Frazioni: Cascina Burrona, Baiacucco, Cascina Crivella, villaggio Nord, Villaggio S. Isidoro

Area
  - Total: 4 km^{2} (1.5 sq mi)
- Elevation: 128 m (420 ft)

Population (29 February 2016)
  - Total: 17,072
  - Density: 4,300/km^{2} (11,000/sq mi)
- Demonym: Vimodronesi
- Time zone: UTC+1 (CET)
  - Summer (DST): UTC+2 (CEST)
- Postal code: 20055
- Dialing code: 02
- Website: Official website

Vimodrone (Lombard: Vimodron [ʋimuˈdrũː]; historically Modrone or Vico Modrone) is a comune (municipality) in the Metropolitan City of Milan in the Italian region of Lombardy. It is located about 14 kilometres (9 mi) northeast of Milan.

Vimodrone borders the following municipalities: Cologno Monzese, Cernusco sul Naviglio, Milan, Pioltello, Segrate.

The area has historical associations with the Visconti di Modrone family.

== Twin towns ==
Vimodrone is twinned with:

- Bella, Italy, since 2012
- Cittanova, Italy, since 2017
- Qeshm in Iran, Since 13 February 2016
