= Cologno Nord (Milan Metro) =

Milan metro station

Coordinates: 45.5334°N 9.2837°E

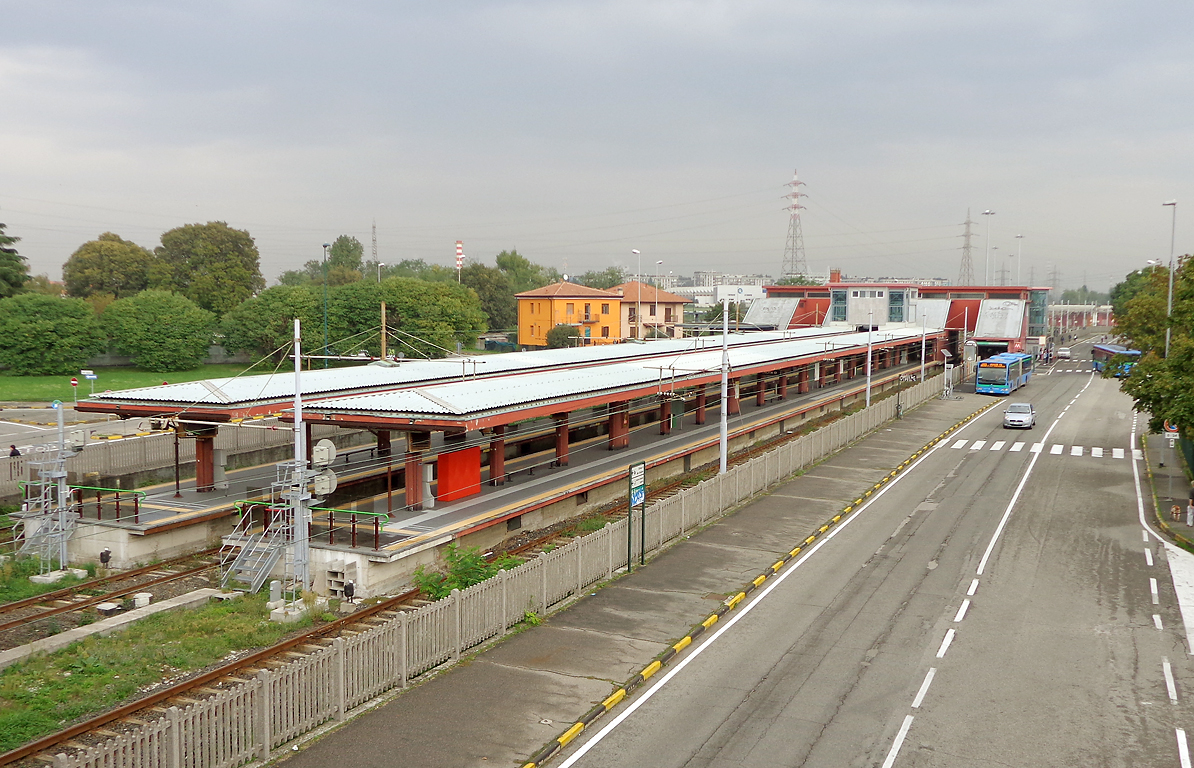

General information
- Location: Milan; Italy
- Owner: Azienda Trasporti Milanesi
- Platforms: 2
- Tracks: 3

Construction
- Structure type: At grade
- Parking: 900 places
- Accessible: y

Other information
- Fare zone: STIBM: Mi3

History
- Opened: 7 June 1981; 45 years ago

Services
Preceding station	Milan Metro	Following station
Cologno Centro towards Assago or Abbiategrasso	Line 2	Terminus
Location

Cologno Nord is a suburban station on Line 2 of the Milan Metro in the municipality of Cologno Monzese.

== History ==
The station was opened 7 June 1981 with the opening of the Cologno Monzese branch from Cascina Gobba. Between 9 July 2010 and 18 December 2011 the station was renovated. In particular, there have been improvements in the signs and four elevators installed. In general, the station was adapted for people with disabilities during that renovation. The project cost was about €1.7 million, and was fully funded by the Province of Milan.
