= Gorgonzola (Milan Metro) =

Milan metro station

Coordinates: 45.5367°N 9.4035°E

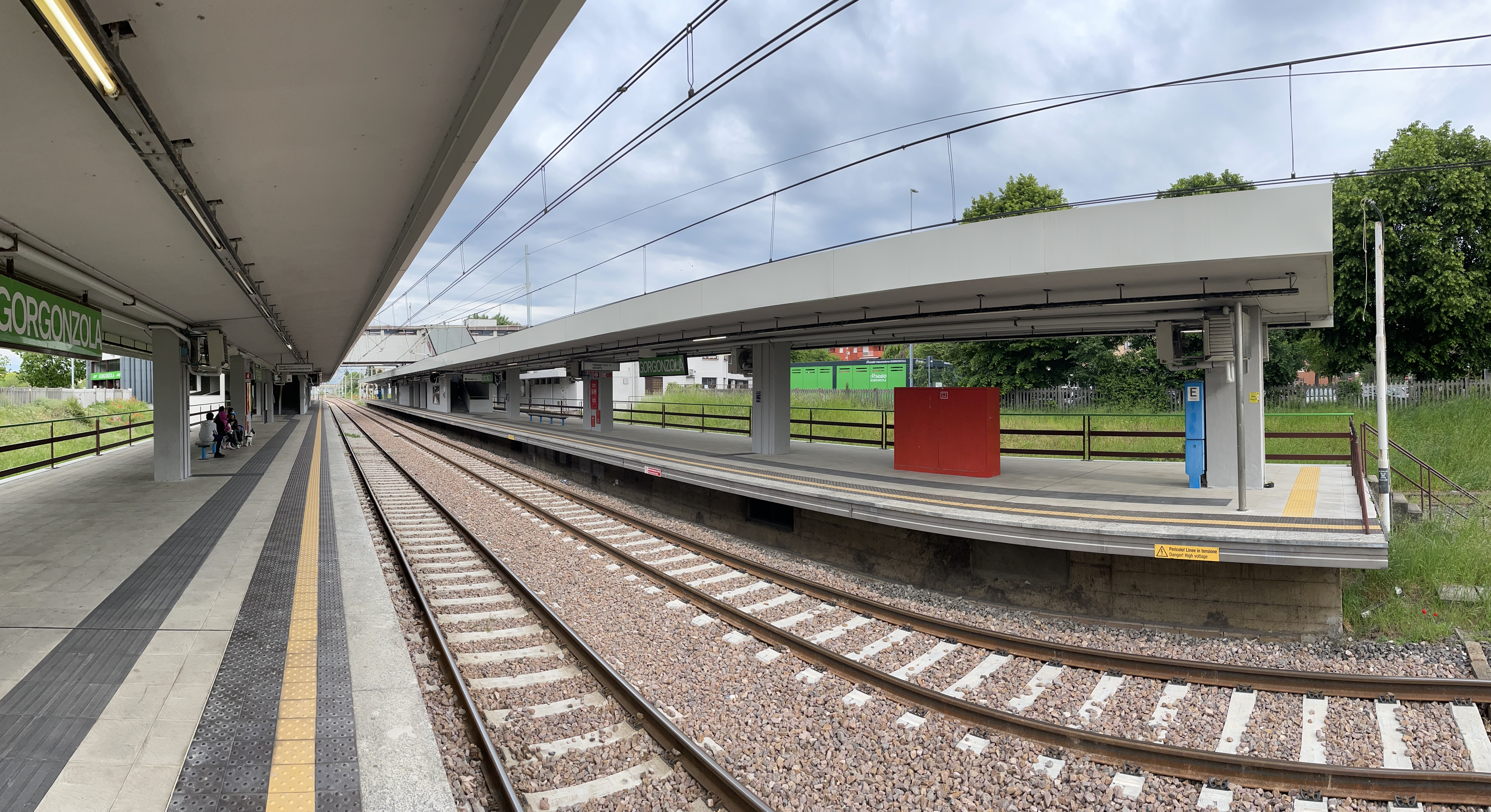

General information
- Location: Gorgonzola, Milan; Italy
- Owner: Azienda Trasporti Milanesi
- Platforms: 2
- Tracks: 2

Construction
- Structure type: At grade

Other information
- Fare zone: STIBM: Mi5

History
- Opened: 5 May 1968; 58 years ago as tramway stop 4 December 1972; 53 years ago as metro station

Services
Preceding station	Milan Metro	Following station
Villa Pompea towards Assago or Abbiategrasso	Line 2	Cascina Antonietta towards Gessate
Location

Gorgonzola is a suburban station on Line 2 of the Milan Metro in the town of the same name.

== History ==
The station was opened in 1968, as a terminus of the Milan-Gorgonzola fast tramway line. The fast tram line initially continued to Vaprio and Cassano. From 4 December 1972 the service on the Milan-Gorgonzola was carried by the trains of line 2 of the Milan subway, while the tram service continued between Gorgonzola and Vaprio, and therefore the station Gorgonzola became the interchange between metro and tram transport. The station, however, turned out to be unfit to perform the function of metropolitan line terminus, due to the lack of adequate parking spaces. Therefore, in 1973, work began to extend the line up to Gessate. Work proceeded slowly, with some interruptions, however, well before its conclusion, on 1 February 1978 the remaining tramway Gorgonzola-Vaprio was abolished and replaced by a bus service. The extension from Gorgonzola to Gessate was finally opened 13 April 1985.

== Station structure ==
The station was built with four tracks, served by two side platforms covered by canopies, the passenger building was built south of the tracks, and connected to the platforms with an overpass. The decision to equip the station with four tracks was due to the original design of tram lines, which provided local and interurban services, and therefore the necessity of passing tracks. The presence of four tracks proved to be useful, however, only between 1972 and 1978, when the station was used as an interchange between the underground and tram. Later the two side rails become useless and were dismantled.
