= Gorgonzola, Lombardy =

Town in Milan, Italy

Gorgonzola
- Comune
- Città di Gorgonzola
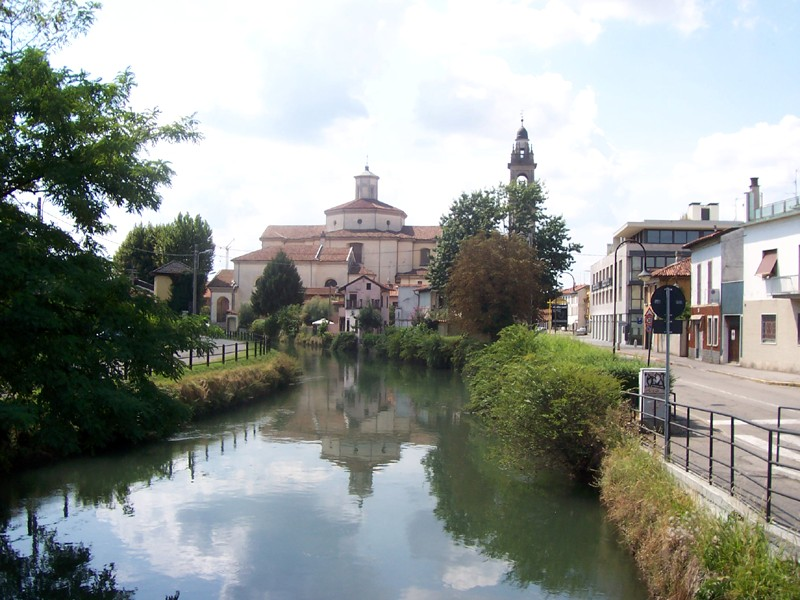
- The bell tower of the Church of Saints Gervasio and Protasio visible from Via Italia in Gorgonzola

- Coat of arms

- Location within Italy Location within Lombardy
- Coordinates: 45°32′N 9°24′E
- Country: Italy
- Region: Lombardy
- Metropolitan city: Milan (MI)

Government
  - Mayor: Ilaria Scaccabarozzi (centre-left coalition)

Area
  - Total: 10.69 km^{2} (4.13 sq mi)
- Elevation: 133 m (436 ft)

Population (31 December 2020)
  - Total: 20,862
  - Density: 1,952/km^{2} (5,054/sq mi)
- Demonym: Gorgonzolesi
- Time zone: UTC+1 (CET)
  - Summer (DST): UTC+2 (CEST)
- Postal code: 20064
- Dialing code: 02
- Website: Official website

Gorgonzola (Italian pronunciation: [ɡorɡonˈdzɔːla]; Lombard: Gorgonzoeula [ɡurɡũˈzøːla]) is a town in the Metropolitan City of Milan, Lombardy, northern Italy. It is part of the territory of the Martesana, northeast of Milan. Gorgonzola cheese is named after the town.

== History ==
The first written records mentioning the village of Gorgonzola date back to the 10th century: the notary clerk of the convent of Saint Ambrose in Milan was the caretaker of the church of Saints Gervasio and Protasio in "Gorgontiola". In 453 the church, located in the current suburb of Gorgonzola, was attacked by the Huns who destroyed the nearby Roman town of Argentia, causing the small village, which had grown from one "mutatio" (station for changing horses) to become the most densely populated of the surrounding territories.

In 1176, it joined the Lombard League and, in 1245, during clashes that followed the Peace of Constance in 1183 and which involved the heirs of Frederick Barbarossa, during the assault by Frederick II on the ramparts of Milan, the forces of Lombardy had to hold up in Gorgonzola: there were clashes amongst them and commanders of both sides were captured by their respective enemies.

In the 13th century, the town belonged directly to the Milanese family of the Della Torre, before they were ousted by the Visconti. In 1288, Gorgonzola was recorded as one of the most important churches of the diocese of Milan, and in 1510 it appears for the first time on a document, with its current name.

Towards the end of the 18th century, the town became politically significant for the area around Milan, particularly the 12th district of Lombardy, and it was vested with the power to administer 33 neighbouring towns. By the time of the Italian unification in 1861, Gorgonzola was in charge of administering only 19 of these, including one that was larger than itself: Cernusco sul Naviglio. In 1861, the population of the area was 28,496, only 4,320 of whom lived in Gorgonzola itself.

== Etymology ==
For a long time, it was thought that the name derived from the Latin "Curte Argentia" which seems to indicate a settlement near the Roman town of Argentia, situated between Milan and Bergamo, or, according to other interpretations, a place for the horses at the 14th mile on the road towards Bergamo; over time the name would undergo the change in Curt-Argentia, Cort-argentiola and finally Gorgonzola. A more recent theory is that it takes its name from the goddess Concordia, corrupted into Corcondiola and finally to Gorgonzola.

== Climate ==
Gorgonzola is located in the west of the basin of the Po Valley, and has a continental climate. Winters are cold, with heavy frost and fog, and temperatures frequently close to or below freezing. There are approximately 100 frost days per year, mostly from late November to early April, but occasionally in October or April as well.

Summers are very hot and humid, as throughout the Po Valley, but affected by very strong storms, destructive and often accompanied by lightning, hail and strong winds. The storms are most common in July and often cause significant cooling. Even in midsummer, cool days with temperatures of 12–15 °C are possible, and the months between June and August are quite rainy.

Overall, rainfall in Gorgonzola is very abundant and relatively evenly distributed throughout the year. However, winter months are drier, with a low of about 68 mm (2.7 in) in January. Snow falls from November to March and accumulations can be substantial. The average accumulations per event is around 100 mm (3.9 in). Total episodes of snow in a year are never more than ten.

Humidity is high throughout the year, especially in the winter months and during the night. Rainy and foggy days are becoming less frequent, although the total annual rainfall has not changed significantly. The mists are favoured by the clear skies, which allow cooling from radiation.

== Economy ==
In 2008, there were 1,223 companies in the municipality with a total of 4,770 employees. Of these, 1,461 employees were in industry, 688 in the commerce sector, and 2,233 in the service sector.

== Transport ==
The municipality of Gorgonzola is served by the line M2 of the Milan Metro with three stops: Villa Pompea (Piazza Marzabotto), Gorgonzola (Piazza Europa) and Cascina Antonietta (Via Sondrio).

== Cheese ==
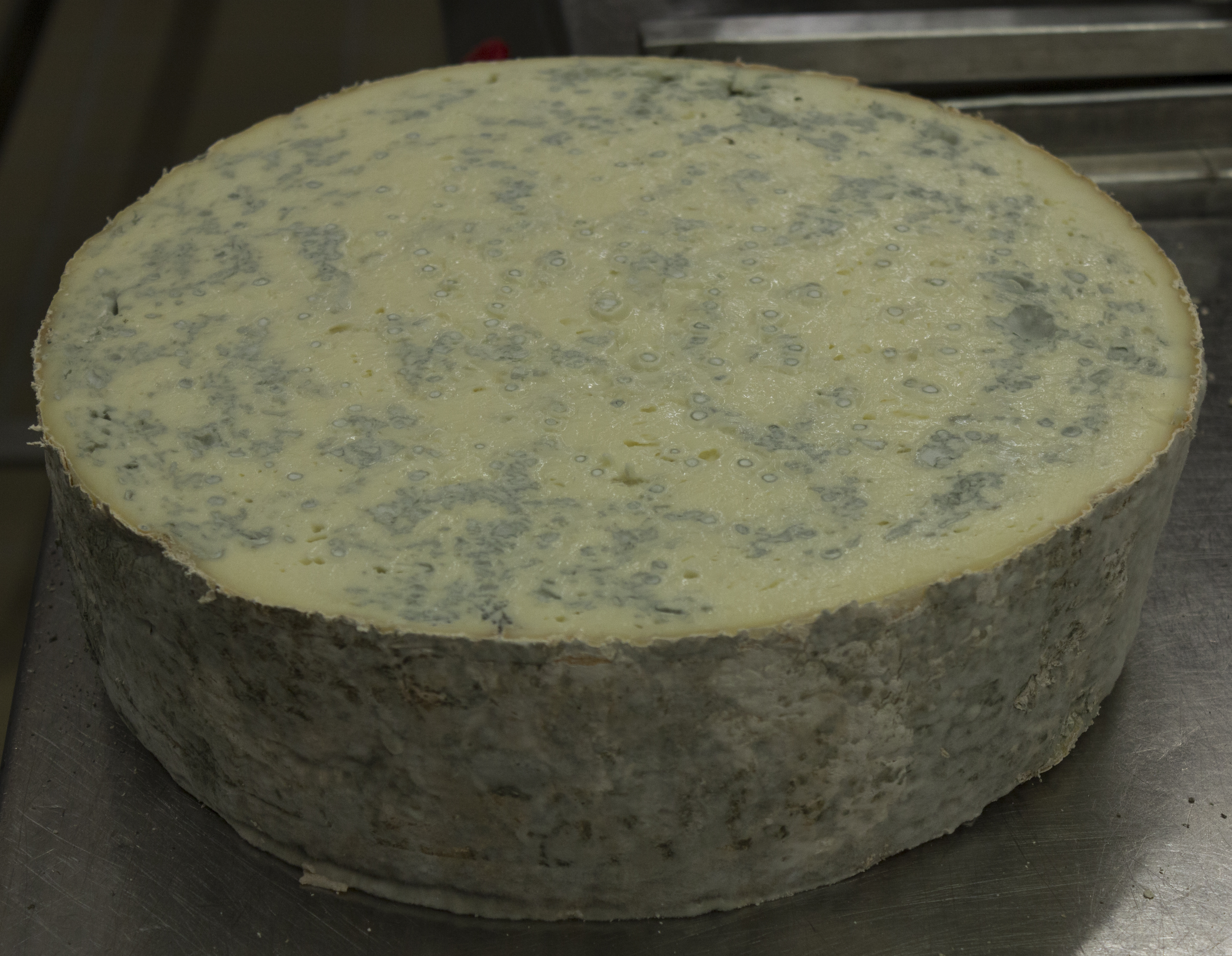
Gorgonzola cheese is said to have been born in Gorgonzola.

The city claims to have been the birthplace of its namesake cheese in 879, although other towns claim the origins. The area has a long history of breeding dairy cows and cheese production, in particular soft cheese. In this regard, there are documents in the city of Milan that prove the presence of these cattle and sheep, periodically surveyed and took the Empress Maria Theresa of Austria, who, in one of her proclamations declared that the areas east of Milan would continue in the cultivation of meadows for the breeding of dairy cows to be used in the production of cheese.

== Main sights ==
The main city church is dedicated to Saints Gervasio and Protasio, and was completely rebuilt in the 19th century in the neoclassical style by Simone Cantoni for the Duke Serbelloni.

The sanctuary of Our Lady of Help, formerly dedicated to St. Peter, part of an ancient convent of the Humiliated, religious architecture is the city's oldest. It was later dedicated to Our Lady of Help. The marble altar is from the 17th century, and there is a Via Crucis of valuable wood. In the past the church had an 18th-century pipe organ.

== Sport ==
The main volleyball team is US Volleyball Argentia whose male team currently plays in Serie B2, while the ladies play in Serie C. The club has teams of all ages from Under 13 to Under 18, both for men and women.

The main football club is Giana Erminio, which in 2013 achieved its first promotion to Serie D, and was promoted for the first time to Serie C in 2014-2015. The home ground of Giana Erminio (as well as the main ground in the city) is the Municipal Stadium of the City of Gorgonzola. Another football club is POL Argentia, whose first team plays in the second category. Other sports clubs in Gorgonzola include Argentia New Basketball, Shotokan Karate Argentia, and ASD Gorgonzola Cycling. In the town there is also the Group Podistico Gorgonzola, which organises the races known as Running Gipigiata.

== Notable people ==
- Luca Castellazzi, footballer of Turin
- Anacleto Cazzaniga, Archbishop of Urbino, former provost of Gorgonzola
- Camillo Ripamonti, senator and minister of the Republic

== Twin towns ==
- Ambert, France, since 2003. The towns, known for their blue cow's-milk cheeses (Fourme d'Ambert and Gorgonzola cheese), have almost the same latitude: 45° 33' N for Ambert, 45° 32' N for Gorgonzola.
- Annweiler am Trifels, Germany, since September 2008

== See also ==
- Naviglio Martesana
