= Piazza Abbiategrasso (Milan Metro) =

Milan metro station

Abbiategrasso
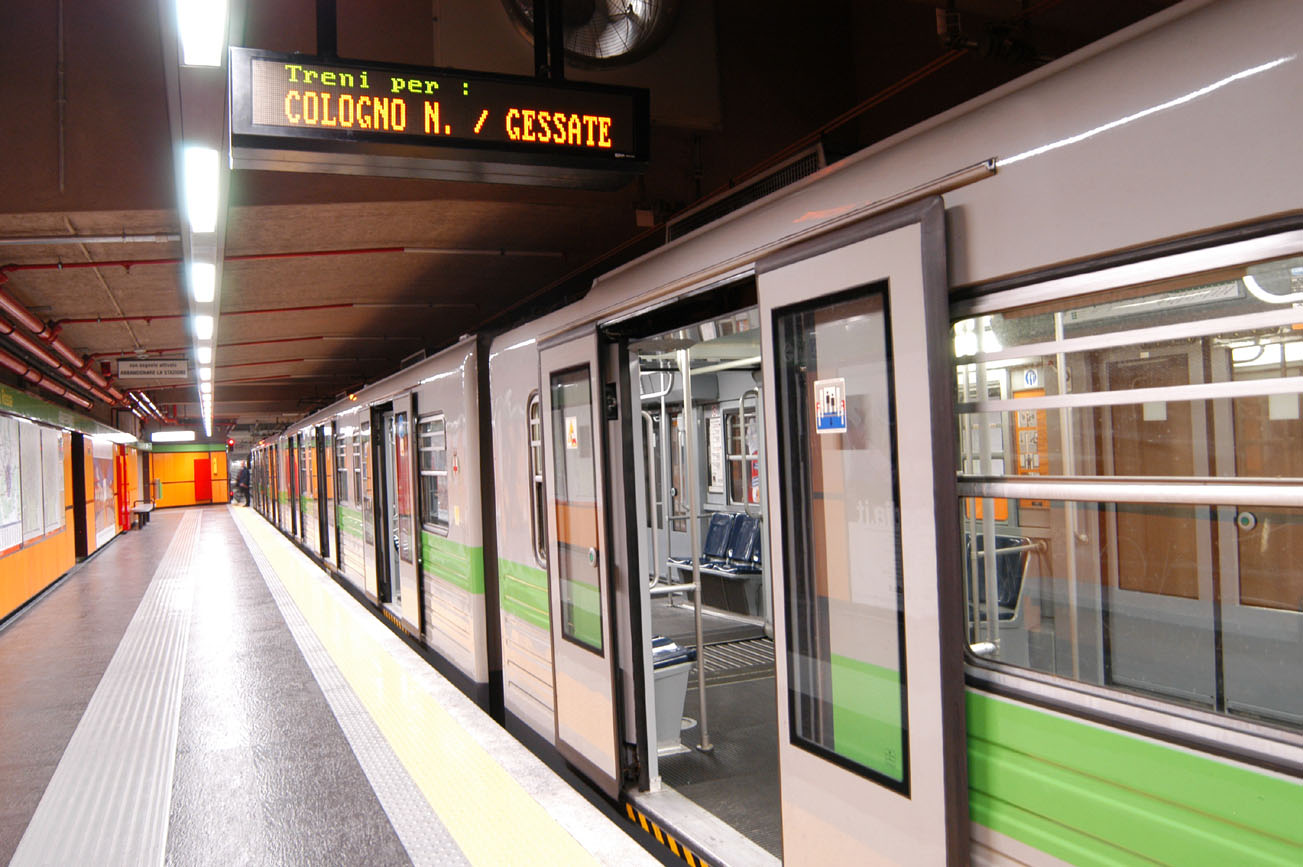

General information
- Location: Piazza Abbiategrasso, Milan; Italy
- Coordinates: 45°25′48″N 9°10′41″E
- Owner: Azienda Trasporti Milanesi
- Platforms: 2
- Tracks: 2

Construction
- Structure type: Underground
- Accessible: Yes

Other information
- Fare zone: STIBM: Mi1

History
- Opened: 17 March 2005; 21 years ago

Services
Preceding station	Milan Metro	Following station
Terminus	Line 2	Famagosta towards Cologno Nord or Gessate
Location

Piazza Abbiategrasso is a station on Line 2 of the Milan Metro. It is one of the two southern termini of the line, the other one being Assago Milanofiori Forum. The station was opened on 17 March 2005 as a one-station extension from Famagosta.
