= Gessate (Milan Metro) =

Milan metro station

Coordinates: 45.5453°N 9.4367°E

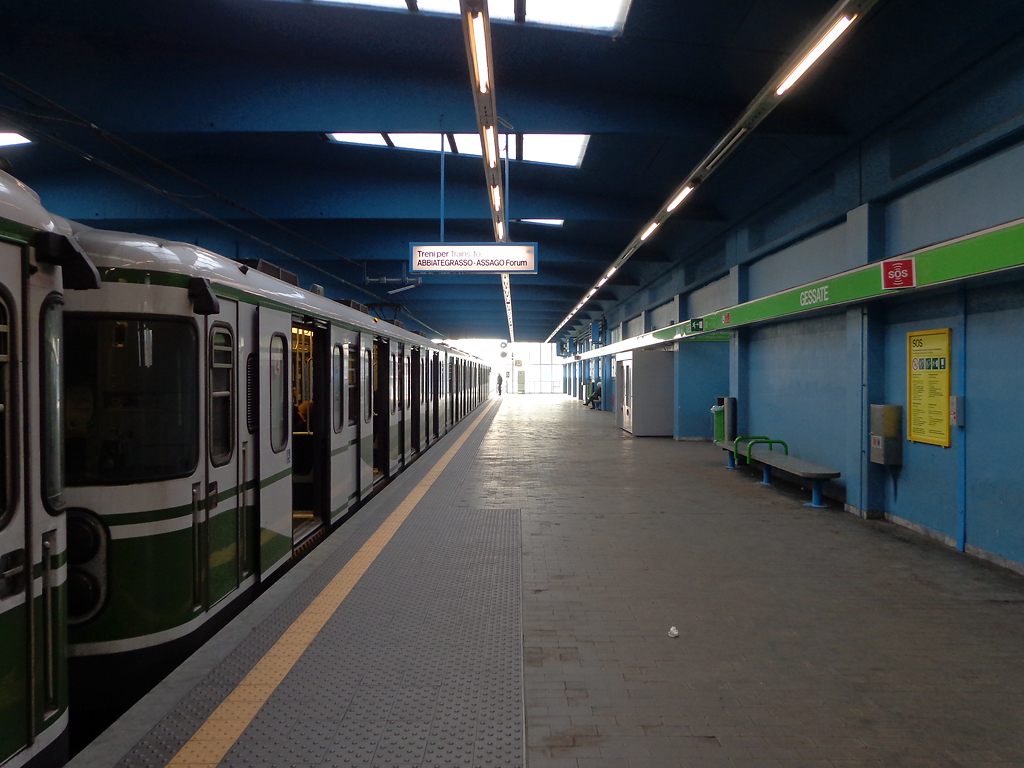

General information
- Location: Gessate; Italy
- Owner: Azienda Trasporti Milanesi
- Platforms: 2
- Tracks: 2

Construction
- Structure type: At grade
- Accessible: y

Other information
- Fare zone: STIBM: Mi6

History
- Opened: 13 April 1985; 41 years ago

Passengers
- 5

Services
Preceding station	Milan Metro	Following station
Cascina Antonietta towards Assago or Abbiategrasso	Line 2	Terminus
Location
- Location within Italy Location within Europe

Gessate is a suburban station on Line 2 of the Milan Metro serving the town of Gessate.

== History ==
The station was opened 13 April 1985, as the terminus of the extension from Gorgonzola. From 26 July to 31 August 2014 Gessate station was closed for the construction of the Outer Ring Road east of Milan. During the closure, trains used the previous station of Cascina Antonietta as their temporary terminus.

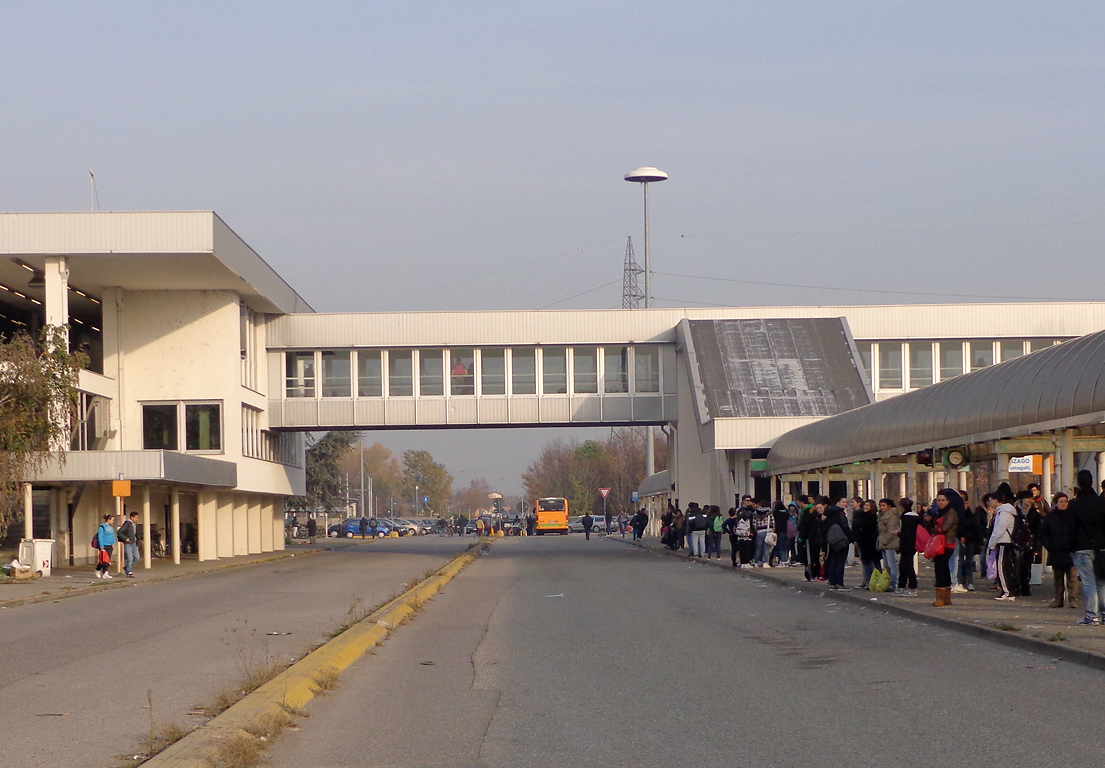
An overpass from the station to the bus stops
