= Assago Milanofiori Forum (Milan Metro) =

Milan metro station

Milanofiori Forum
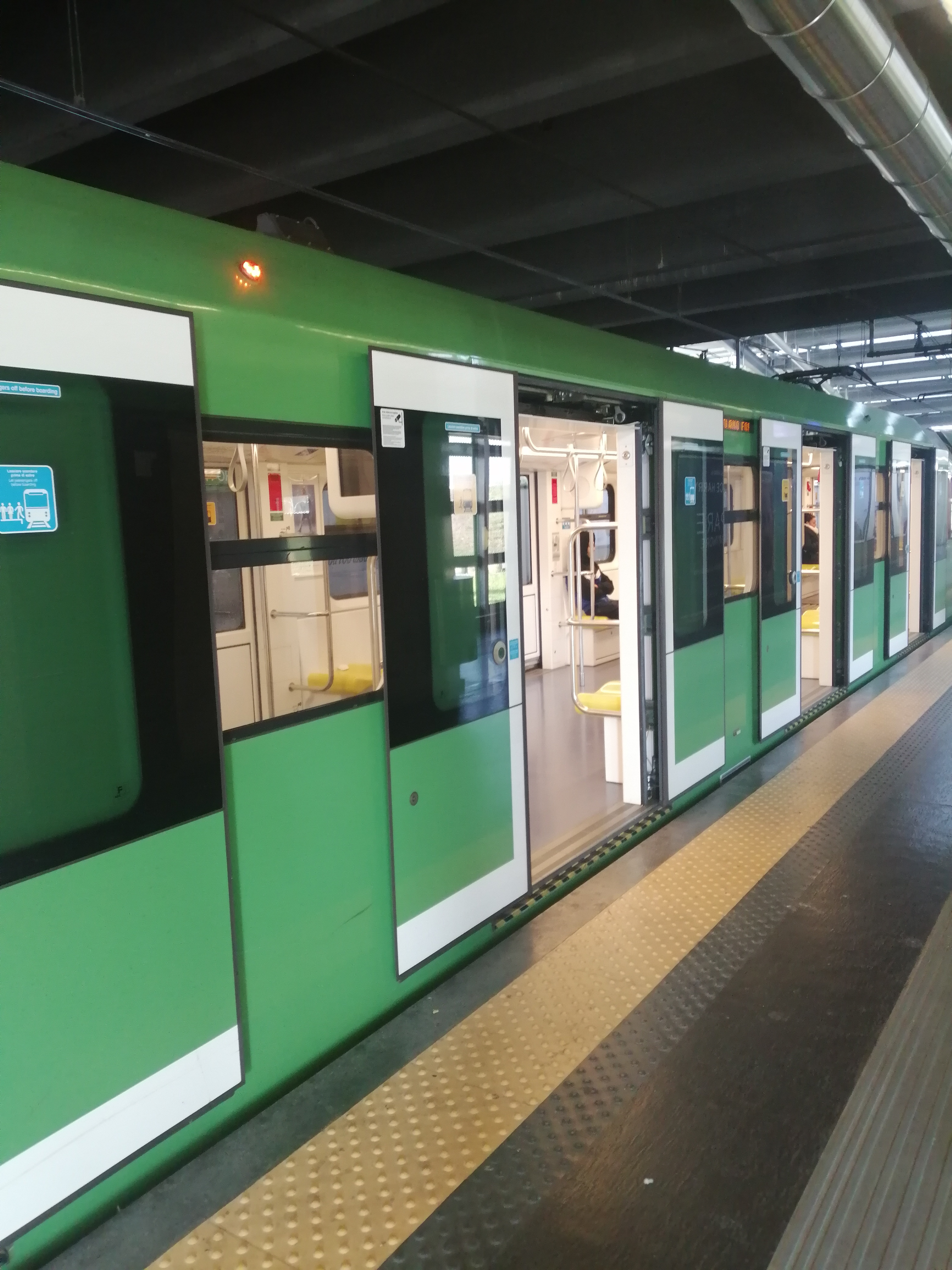

General information
- Location: Assago; Italy
- Coordinates: 45°24′06″N 9°08′44″E
- Owner: Azienda Trasporti Milanesi

Construction
- Structure type: Surface
- Accessible: Yes

Other information
- Fare zone: STIBM: Mi3

History
- Opened: 20 February 2011

Services
| Preceding station | Milan Metro | Following station |
|---|---|---|
| Terminus | Line 2 | Milanofiori Nord towards Cologno Nord or Gessate |
Location

Milanofiori Forum is a station on Line 2 of the Milan Metro, in the southern suburb of Assago. The line here runs beside Autostrada A7, and it is the southernmost station of the network. The station was opened on 20 February 2011 as the terminus of a two-station extension from Famagosta.

The station serves the nearby Assago Forum, an indoor arena. The station can get very crowded after concerts and other events at the Forum.
