= Azienda Trasporti Milanesi =

Milan public transport company

- Type: Società per azioni
- Predecessor: SAO (until 1893); Edison (until 1917)
- Founded: 1931
- Headquarters: Milan, Italy
- Area served: Milan metropolitan area
- Key people: Gioia Ghezzi (President)
- Services: Public transport
- Revenue: €903.097 million (2010)
- Net income: €6.831 million (2010)
- Owner: Municipality of Milan
- Number of employees: 9800 (2018)
- Subsidiaries: ATM servizi, Guidami, GESAM, Nord est trasporti (93.5%), Nuovi trasporti lombardi (74.5%), Mipark (51%), Perotti (51%), International Metro Service (Copenhagen Metro) (51%)
- Website: www.atm.it/en

Azienda Trasporti Milanesi S.p.A. ('Milanese Transports Company JSC'; ATM) is the municipal public transport company of Milan and 46 surrounding metropolitan municipalities. It operates 5 metro lines (see Milan Metro), 17 tram lines (see Trams in Milan), 124 bus lines and 4 trolleybus lines (see Trolleybuses in Milan), carrying about 776 million passengers in 2018.

ATM manages other minor transport services in Lombardy as well. These include Radiobus, a demand-responsive minibus service; the Cascina Gobba–San Raffaele people mover; the Como–Brunate funicular; the BikeMi bike sharing service. Since 2008, ATM it has operated the Copenhagen Metro in Denmark. Since November 2024 it has also been leading (51%) the operation of the Thessaloniki Metro in partnership with Egis Group (49%).

== History ==
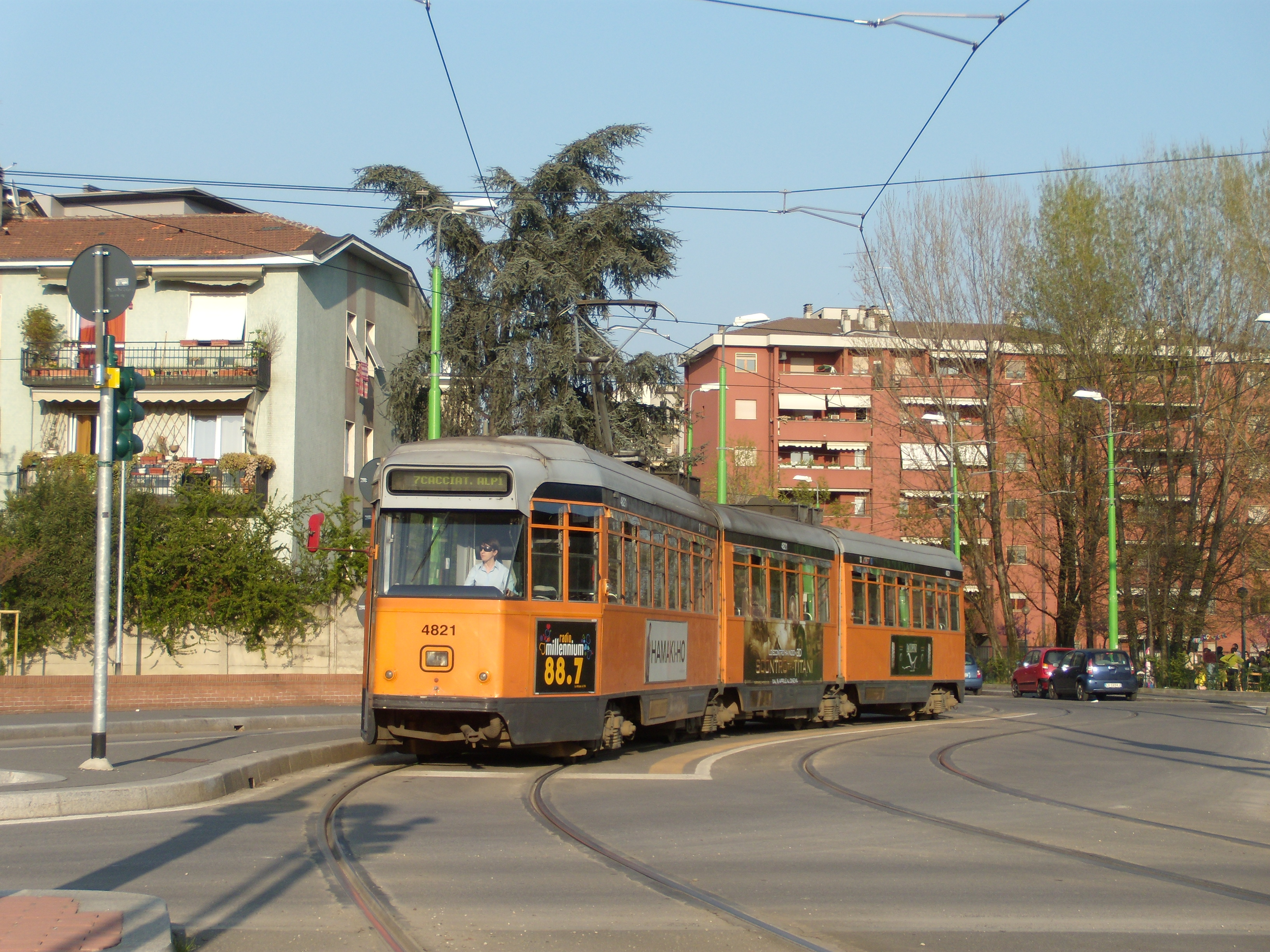
An old 4800 series articulated streetcar (Jumbotram), on the new metrotranvia 7, in Precotto.

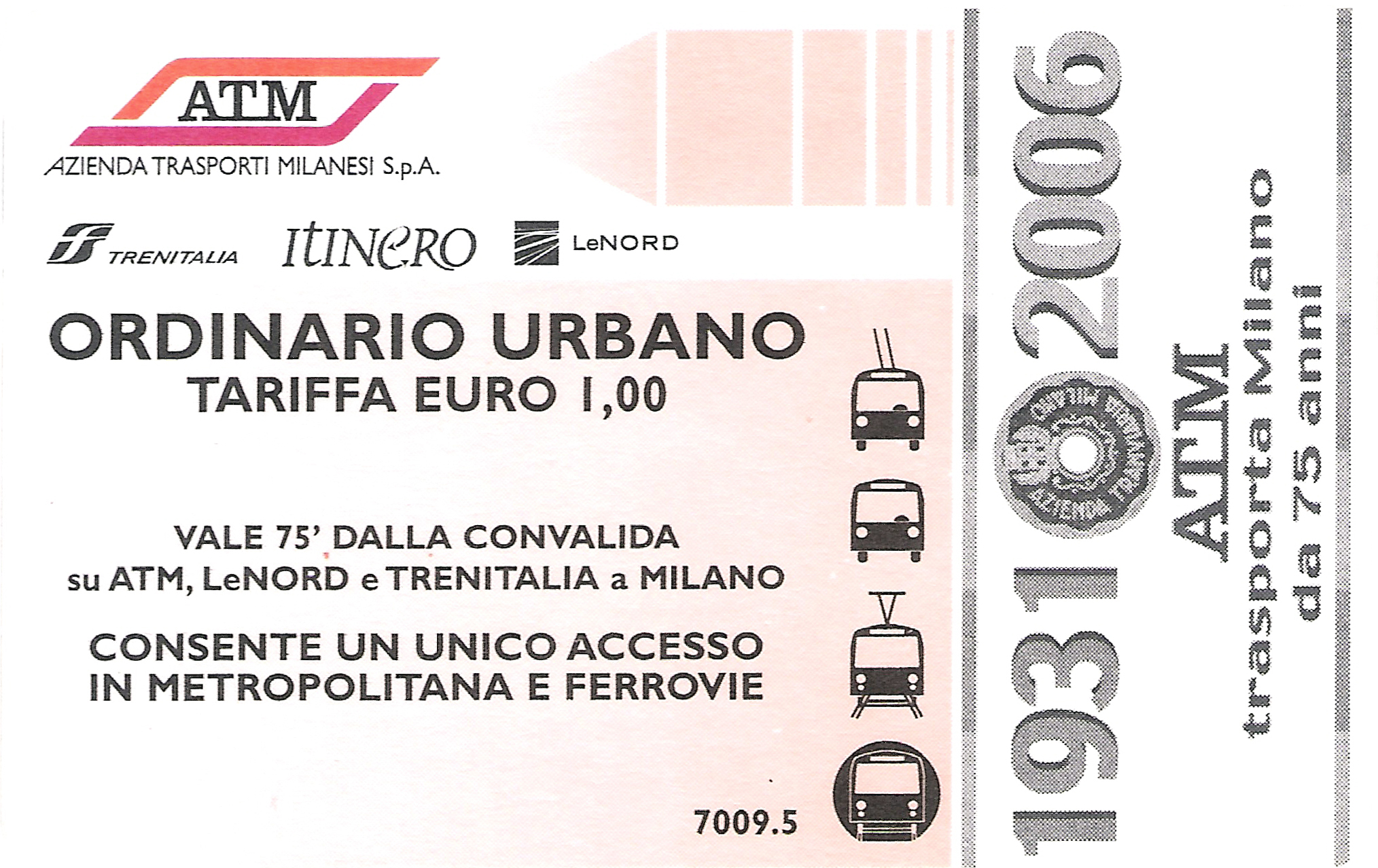
A ticket celebrating the 75th anniversary of ATM.

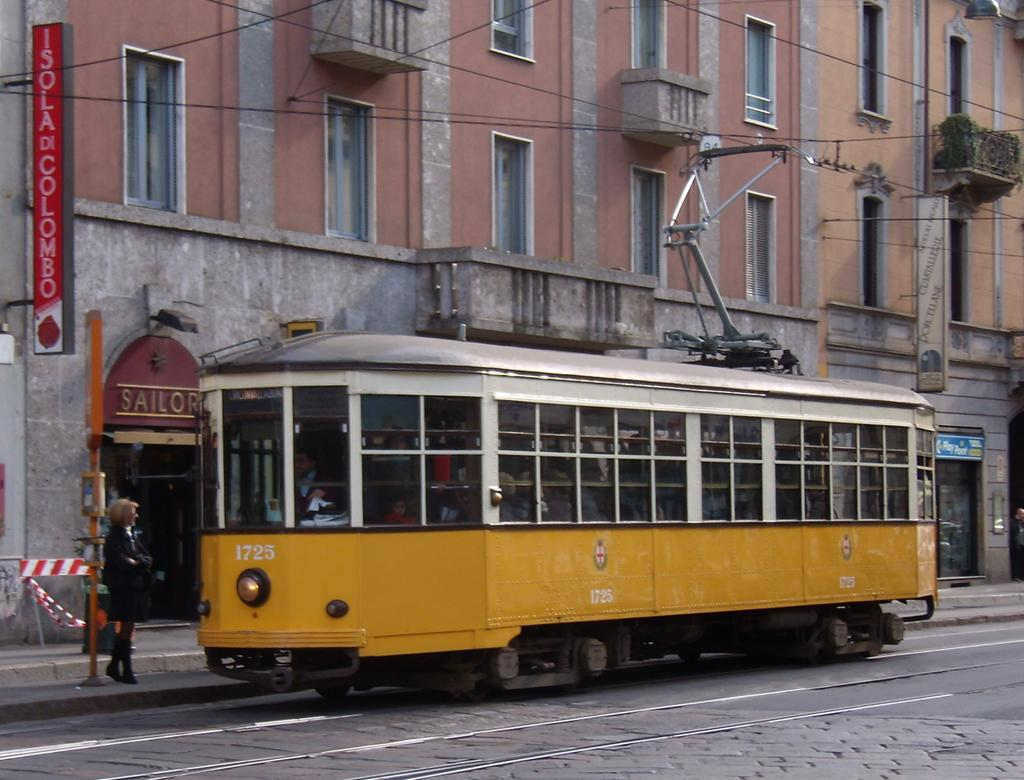
A Class 1500 streetcar on line 29 (now replaced by lines 9 and 10) in Corso Colombo, restored to the original 1920s white-and-yellow livery.

Public transport in Milan started on August 17, 1840, with the opening of the Milan-Monza railway. Horse-drawn buses were introduced in 1841. Services were run by the Società Anonima degli Omnibus (SAO), "Omnibus Anonymous Company". The company was responsible for 11 bus lines between 1861 and 1865.

Few years later the first horse-drawn trams were introduced: 3 lines were opened in 1881 followed in 1893 by the first electric tramway, built by Edison company. Two years later the same company opened 18 more lines, all ruled by municipality offices. Edison's concession on new lines expired in 1917, leaving all the operations to the municipality. Few years later the public offices responsible for public transport operations were made independent, becoming the Azienda Tranviaria Municipale (ATM) in 1931.

In the meantime, the first petrol powered bus lines were introduced in 1905, operated by SITA (Società Italiana Trasporto con Automobili) and then moved under control of ATM along with the first trolleybus line (1933).

After World War II resources were focused on bus lines and, since the mid-1950s, on the new metro. Milan Metro construction began in 1957 and in 1964 the first line was opened. Five years later the Line 2 was inaugurated.

On 1 January 1965, ATM changed its name to "Azienda Trasporti Municipali" (Municipal Transport Company). In these years a new generation of longer tram (jumbotram) were introduced. In the 1960s Italy and Milan saw a strong increase in car owners, and the increasing importance of private over public transport.

Several new stations of the two metro lines are opened in the following years. The new Line 3 was inaugurated in 1990. Tram line 15 to Rozzano was the first to go beyond the city border in 1992.

ATM changed its name again in 1999 to adopt the current one, "Azienda Trasporti Milanesi", and it became a S.p.a. in 2001. In these years, the first on-demand service, the Radiobus, was introduced to operate during the night.

The first light rail line, Line 7, was introduced on 7 December 2002. This was followed by other two lines on 8 December 2003: Line 4 and Line 15. These three lines are howsoever referred to as trams.

New magnetic tickets and electronic pass cards were introduced in 2004. The complete upgrade process took 3 years.

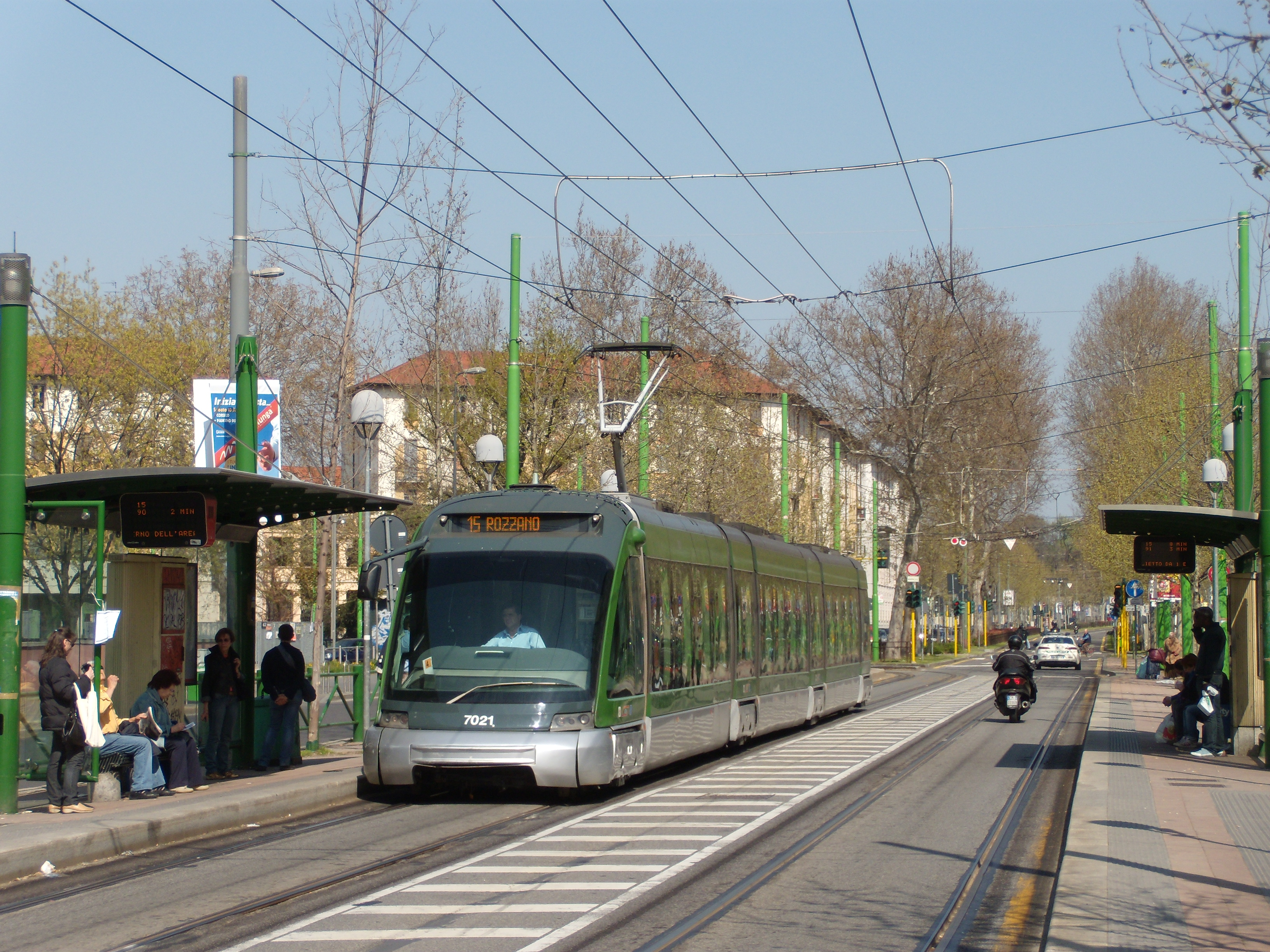
A 7000 series low-floor articulated Eurotram on line 15

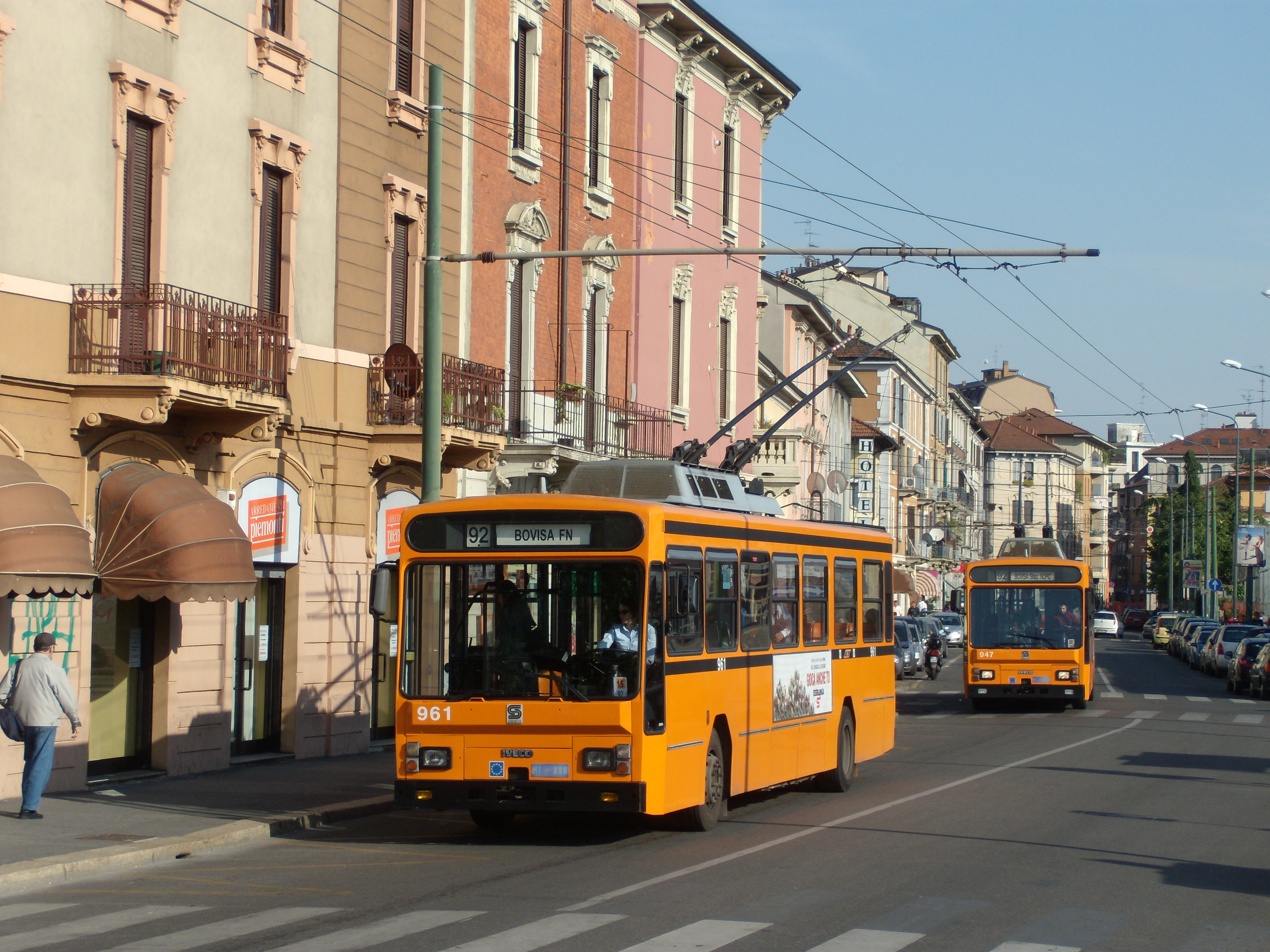
An Iveco trolleybus on line 92 at the Bovisa, near the railway station

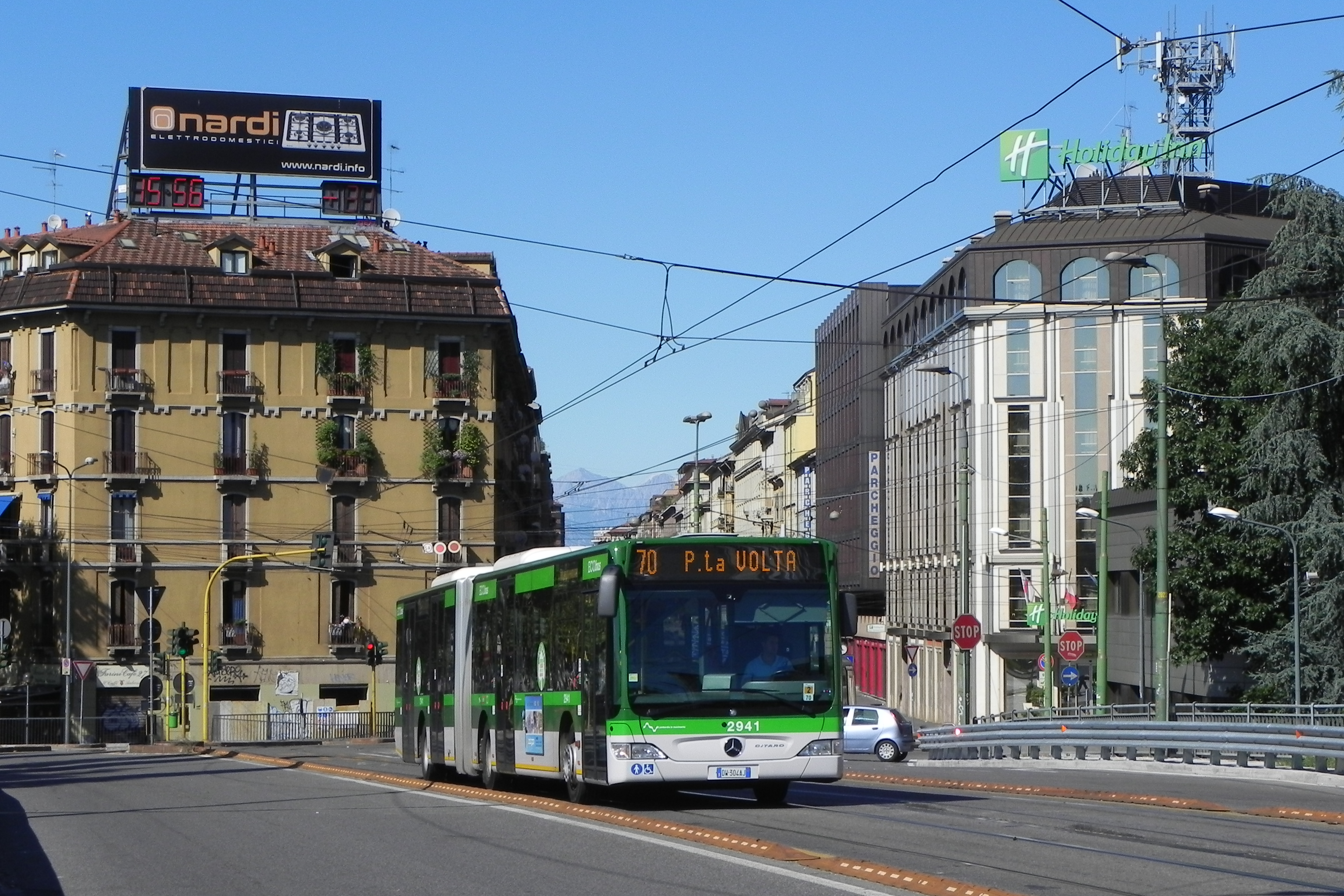
A Mercedes-Benz Citaro on line 70, in via Carlo Farini

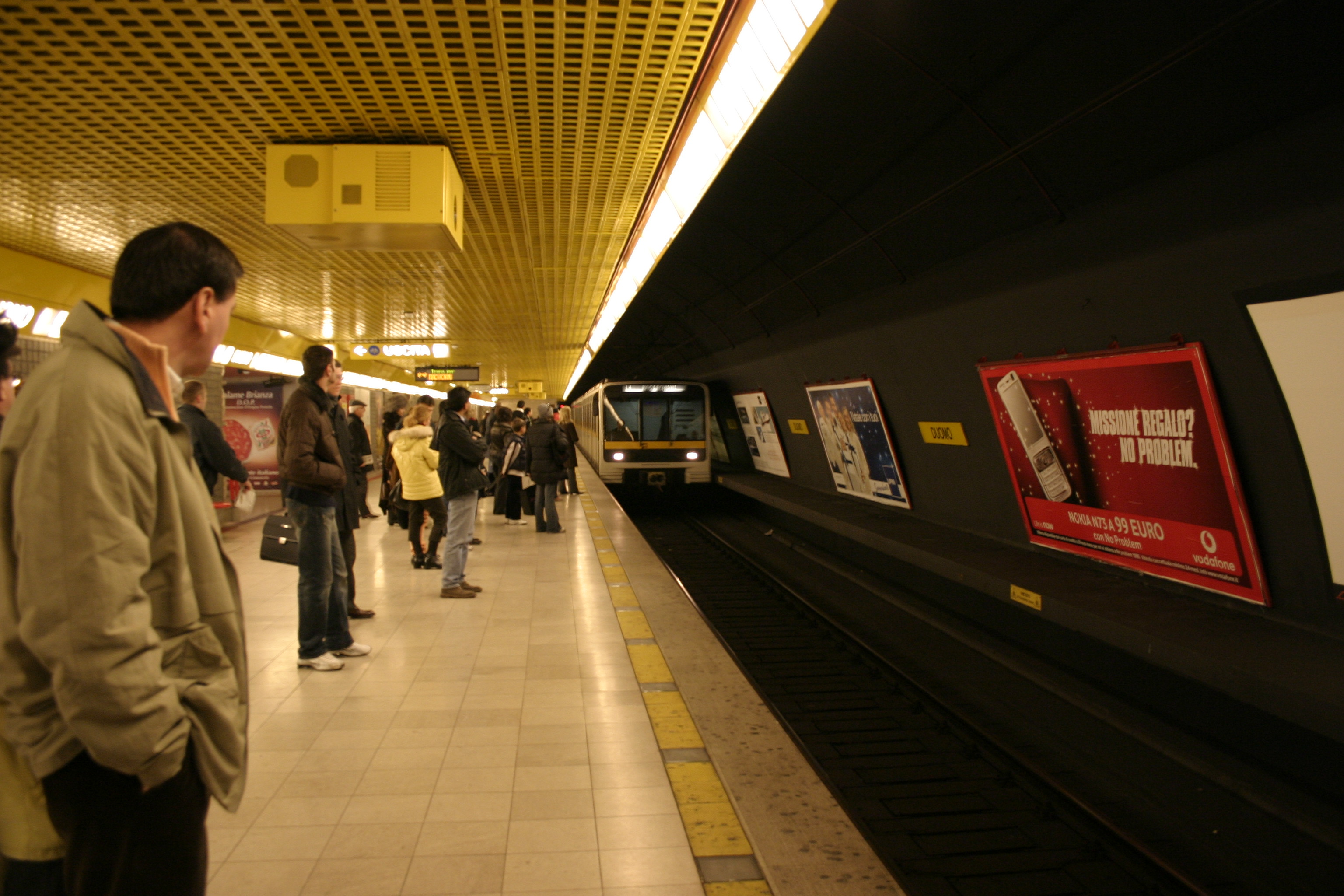
A train of underground line M3 bound for piazzale Maciachini (now extended to Comasina) entering the Duomo station

== Network ==
=== Rapid transit ===
The Milan rapid transit network consists of 5 lines:

- M1: Sesto I Maggio - Rho Fiera / Bisceglie
- M2: Assago Milanofiori Forum / Abbiategrasso - Cologno Nord / Gessate
- M3: San Donato - Comasina
- M4: Linate Aeroporto - San Cristoforo
- M5: San Siro Stadio - Bignami

The network is more than 112 km (70 mi) long and serves 135 stations, mainly underground. The system has a daily ridership of over 1 million and is the biggest in Italy.

Outside of Italy, ATM has operated the Copenhagen Metro. This will conclude in September 2027 when services are taken over by KBH Metro Partner.

=== People mover ===
ATM operates a single people mover line, MeLA, that connects the Milan Metro with San Raffaele Hospital.

=== Trams ===
The tram network comprises 15 lines fully within the city limits (1, 2, 3, 4, 5, 7, 9, 10, 12, 14, 16, 19, 24, 27, 33), plus two lines linking the city centre with the hinterland (15 Milan-Rozzano, 31 Milan-Cinisello Balsamo). Lines 1, 5, 10, 19 and 33 are operated with Peter Witt streetcars from the 1920s.

=== Trolleybuses ===
The trolleybus network consists of 4 lines: lines 90 and 91 (known as la circolare, "Circle line") run around the city, while lines 92 and 93 serve some of the northern and eastern neighbourhoods.

=== Buses ===
ATM operates 65 urban bus lines and 59 interurban bus lines.

== See also ==
- Transport in Milan
- Integrated ticketing in Lombardy
