= List of Milan Metro stations =

Milan Metro network map

The logo

The Milan Metro is the rapid transit system serving Milan, Italy. The network comprises 5 lines (two of which driverless), identified by different numbers and colors, with a total route length of 112 kilometres (70 mi) and 125 stations. The system has a daily ridership of over one million. The metro network is connected to the Milan suburban railway service through several stations. Metro lines are identified by the letter "M", while suburban line numbers are preceded by the letter "S". Milan Metro is the largest rapid transit system in Italy in terms of length, number of stations and ridership; it is the fifth longest in the European Union and the eighth in Europe.

== Stations ==
	Transfer station to suburban railway service
	Transfer station to Regional and National Railway Network
	Transfer station to Suburban Railway Network, Regional and National Railway Network
#	Terminal station
*	Station outside urban fare limit
※	Accessibility for disabled passengers

Station	Photo	Lines	Zone	Opened	Grade
Affori Centro ※		Milan Metro Line 3	1	26 March 2011	Underground
Affori FN ※		Milan Metro Line 3 Line S2 (Milan suburban railway service) Line S4 (Milan suburban railway service)	1	26 March 2011	Underground
Amendola ※		Milan Metro Line 1	1	1 November 1964	Underground
Argonne ※		Milan Metro Line 4	1	26 November 2022	Underground
Assago Milanofiori Forum#* ※		Milan Metro Line 2	3	20 February 2011	Surface
Assago Milanofiori Nord* ※		Milan Metro Line 2	3	20 February 2011	Surface
Bande Nere ※		Milan Metro Line 1	1	18 April 1975	Underground
Bicocca ※		Milan Metro Line 5	1	10 February 2013	Underground
Bignami# ※		Milan Metro Line 5	1	10 February 2013	Underground
Bisceglie# ※		Milan Metro Line 1	1	21 March 1992	Underground
Bolivar ※		Milan Metro Line 4	1	12 October 2024	Underground
Bonola ※		Milan Metro Line 1	1	12 April 1980	Underground
Brenta ※		Milan Metro Line 3	1	12 May 1991	Underground
Buonarroti		Milan Metro Line 1	1	1 November 1964	Underground
Bussero*		Milan Metro Line 2	4	4 December 1972	Surface
Ca’ Granda ※		Milan Metro Line 5	1	10 February 2013	Underground
Cadorna – Triennale ※		Milan Metro Line 1 Milan Metro Line 2 Line S3 (Milan suburban railway service) Line S4 (Milan suburban railway service)	1	1 November 1964	Underground
Caiazzo		Milan Metro Line 2	1	27 September 1969	Underground
Cairoli ※		Milan Metro Line 1	1	1 November 1964	Underground
California ※		Milan Metro Line 4	1	12 October 2024	Underground
Cascina Antonietta*		Milan Metro Line 2	5	13 April 1985	Surface
Cascina Burrona*		Milan Metro Line 2	3	4 December 1972	Surface
Cascina Gobba ※		Milan Metro Line 2		27 September 1969	Viaduct
Cassina de' Pecchi*		Milan Metro Line 2	4	4 December 1972	Bridge
Cenisio ※		Milan Metro Line 5	1	20 June 2015	Underground
Centrale ※		Milan Metro Line 2 Milan Metro Line 3	1	27 April 1970	Underground
Cernusco sul Naviglio* ※		Milan Metro Line 2	4	4 December 1972	Surface
Cimiano ※		Milan Metro Line 2	1	27 September 1969	Surface
Cologno Centro*		Milan Metro Line 2	3	7 June 1981	Viaduct
Cologno Nord#*		Milan Metro Line 2	3	7 June 1981	Surface
Cologno Sud*		Milan Metro Line 2	3	7 June 1981	Viaduct
Comasina# ※		Milan Metro Line 3	1	26 March 2011	Underground
Conciliazione		Milan Metro Line 1	1	1 November 1964	Underground
Coni Zugna ※		Milan Metro Line 4	1	12 October 2024	Underground
Cordusio ※		Milan Metro Line 1	1	1 November 1964	Underground
Corvetto ※		Milan Metro Line 3	1	12 May 1991	Underground
Crescenzago ※		Milan Metro Line 2	1	27 September 1969	Surface
Crocetta ※		Milan Metro Line 3	1	16 December 1990	Underground
Dateo ※		Milan Metro Line 4 Line S1 (Milan suburban railway service) Line S2 (Milan suburban railway service) Line S5 (Milan suburban railway service) Line S6 (Milan suburban railway service) Line S12 (Milan suburban railway service) Line S13 (Milan suburban railway service)	1	26 November 2022	Underground
De Amicis ※		Milan Metro Line 4	1	12 October 2024	Underground
De Angeli		Milan Metro Line 1	1	2 April 1966	Underground
Dergano ※		Milan Metro Line 3	1	26 March 2011	Underground
Domodossola ※		Milan Metro Line 5	1	29 April 2015	Underground
Duomo ※		Milan Metro Line 1 Milan Metro Line 3	1	1 November 1964	Underground
Famagosta ※		Milan Metro Line 2	1	1 November 1994	Underground
Frattini ※		Milan Metro Line 4	1	12 October 2024	Underground
Gambara ※		Milan Metro Line 1	1	2 April 1966	Underground
Garibaldi FS ※		Milan Metro Line 2 Milan Metro Line 5 Line S1 (Milan suburban railway service) Line S2 (Milan suburban railway service) Line S5 (Milan suburban railway service) Line S6 (Milan suburban railway service) Line S7 (Milan suburban railway service) Line S8 (Milan suburban railway service) Line S11 (Milan suburban railway service) Line S12 (Milan suburban railway service) Line S13 (Milan suburban railway service)	1	12 July 1971	Underground
Gelsomini ※		Milan Metro Line 4	1	12 October 2024	Underground
Gerusalemme ※		Milan Metro Line 5	1	26 September 2015	Underground
Gessate#*		Milan Metro Line 2	6	13 April 1985	Surface
Gioia ※		Milan Metro Line 2	1	12 July 1971	Underground
Gorgonzola*		Milan Metro Line 2	5	4 December 1972	Surface
Gorla ※		Milan Metro Line 1	1	1 November 1964	Underground
Inganni ※		Milan Metro Line 1	1	18 April 1975	Underground
Isola ※		Milan Metro Line 5	1	1 March 2014	Underground
Istria ※		Milan Metro Line 5	1	10 February 2013	Underground
Lambrate ※		Milan Metro Line 2 Line S9 (Milan suburban railway service)	1	27 September 1969	Underground
Lampugnano ※		Milan Metro Line 1	1	12 April 1980	Underground
Lanza - Brera - Piccolo Teatro		Milan Metro Line 2	1	3 March 1978	Underground
Lima		Milan Metro Line 1	1	1 November 1964	Underground
Linate Aeroporto# ※		Milan Metro Line 4	1	26 November 2022	Underground
Lodi T.I.B.B. ※		Milan Metro Line 3 Line S9 (Milan suburban railway service) Line S19 (Milan suburban railway service)	1	12 May 1991	Underground
Loreto ※		Milan Metro Line 1 Milan Metro Line 2	1	1 November 1964	Underground
Lotto - Fieramilanocity		Milan Metro Line 1 Milan Metro Line 5	1	1 November 1964	Underground
Maciachini ※		Milan Metro Line 3	1	8 December 2003	Underground
Marche ※		Milan Metro Line 5	1	10 February 2013	Underground
Missori ※		Milan Metro Line 3	1	16 December 1990	Underground
Molino Dorino ※		Milan Metro Line 1	1	28 September 1986	Underground
Montenapoleone ※		Milan Metro Line 3	1	3 May 1990	Underground
Monumentale ※		Milan Metro Line 5	1	11 October 2015	Underground
Moscova		Milan Metro Line 2	1	3 March 1978	Underground
Pagano ※		Milan Metro Line 1	1	1 November 1964	Underground
Palestro ※		Milan Metro Line 1	1	1 November 1964	Underground
Pasteur		Milan Metro Line 1	1	1 November 1964	Underground
Pero* ※		Milan Metro Line 1	3	19 December 2005	Underground
Piazza Abbiategrasso# ※		Milan Metro Line 2	1	17 March 2005	Underground
Piola ※		Milan Metro Line 2	1	27 September 1969	Underground
Ponale ※		Milan Metro Line 5	1	10 February 2013	Underground
Porta Genova ※		Milan Metro Line 2	1	30 October 1983	Underground
Porta Romana ※		Milan Metro Line 3	1	16 December 1990	Underground
Porta Venezia ※		Milan Metro Line 1 Line S1 (Milan suburban railway service) Line S2 (Milan suburban railway service) Line S5 (Milan suburban railway service) Line S6 (Milan suburban railway service) Line S12 (Milan suburban railway service) Line S13 (Milan suburban railway service)	1	1 November 1964	Underground
Portello ※		Milan Metro Line 5	1	6 June 2015	Underground
Porto di Mare ※		Milan Metro Line 3	1	12 May 1991	Underground
Precotto		Milan Metro Line 1	1	1 November 1964	Underground
Primaticcio		Milan Metro Line 1	1	8 November 1975	Underground
QT8		Milan Metro Line 1	1	8 November 1975	Underground
Repetti ※		Milan Metro Line 4	1	26 November 2022	Underground
Repubblica ※		Milan Metro Line 3 Line S1 (Milan suburban railway service) Line S2 (Milan suburban railway service) Line S5 (Milan suburban railway service) Line S6 (Milan suburban railway service) Line S12 (Milan suburban railway service) Line S13 (Milan suburban railway service)	1	3 May 1990	Underground
Rho Fiera#* ※		Milan Metro Line 1 Line S5 (Milan suburban railway service) Line S6 (Milan suburban railway service)	3	30 March 2005	Underground
Rogoredo ※		Milan Metro Line 3 Line S1 (Milan suburban railway service) Line S2 (Milan suburban railway service) Line S12 (Milan suburban railway service) Line S13 (Milan suburban railway service) Line S19 (Milan suburban railway service)	1	12 May 1991	Underground
Romolo ※		Milan Metro Line 2 Line S9 (Milan suburban railway service) Line S19 (Milan suburban railway service)	1	13 April 1985	Underground
Rovereto		Milan Metro Line 1	1	1 November 1964	Underground
San Babila ※		Milan Metro Line 1 Milan Metro Line 4	1	1 November 1964	Underground
San Cristoforo FS# ※		Milan Metro Line 4 Line S9 (Milan suburban railway service) Line S19 (Milan suburban railway service)	1	12 October 2024	Underground
San Donato# ※		Milan Metro Line 3		12 May 1991	Underground
San Leonardo		Milan Metro Line 1	1	12 April 1980	Underground
San Siro Ippodromo ※		Milan Metro Line 5	1	29 April 2015	Underground
San Siro Stadio# ※		Milan Metro Line 5	1	29 April 2015	Underground
Sant'Agostino ※		Milan Metro Line 2	1	30 October 1983	Underground
Sant'Ambrogio ※		Milan Metro Line 2 Milan Metro Line 4	1	30 October 1983	Underground
Santa Sofia ※		Milan Metro Line 4	1	12 October 2024	Underground
Segesta ※		Milan Metro Line 5	1	29 April 2015	Underground
Segneri ※		Milan Metro Line 4	1	12 October 2024	Underground
Sesto 1º Maggio#* ※		Milan Metro Line 1 Line S7 (Milan suburban railway service) Line S8 (Milan suburban railway service) Line S9 (Milan suburban railway service) Line S11 (Milan suburban railway service)	3	28 September 1986	Underground
Sesto Marelli ※		Milan Metro Line 1	3	1 November 1964	Underground
Sesto Rondò*		Milan Metro Line 1	3	28 September 1986	Underground
Sforza-Policlinico ※		Milan Metro Line 4	1	12 October 2024	Underground
Sondrio ※		Milan Metro Line 3	1	12 May 1991	Underground
Stazione Forlanini ※		Milan Metro Line 4 Line S5 (Milan suburban railway service) Line S6 (Milan suburban railway service) Line S9 (Milan suburban railway service)	1	26 November 2022	Underground
Susa ※		Milan Metro Line 4	1	26 November 2022	Underground
Tolstoj ※		Milan Metro Line 4	1	12 October 2024	Underground
Tre Torri ※		Milan Metro Line 5	1	14 November 2015	Underground
Tricolore ※		Milan Metro Line 4	1	4 July 2023	Underground
Turati ※		Milan Metro Line 3	1	3 May 1990	Underground
Turro		Milan Metro Line 1	1	1 November 1964	Underground
Udine ※		Milan Metro Line 2	1	27 September 1969	Underground
Uruguay		Milan Metro Line 1	1	12 April 1980	Underground
Vetra ※		Milan Metro Line 4	1	12 October 2024	Underground
Villa Fiorita*		Milan Metro Line 2	4	4 December 1972	Surface
Villa Pompea*		Milan Metro Line 2	5	4 December 1972	Surface
Villa San Giovanni		Milan Metro Line 1	1	1 November 1964	Underground
Vimodrone*		Milan Metro Line 2	3	4 December 1972	Surface
Wagner		Milan Metro Line 1	1	2 April 1966	Underground
Zara ※		Milan Metro Line 3 Milan Metro Line 5	1	16 December 1995	Underground
