= Turati (Milan Metro) =

Milan metro station

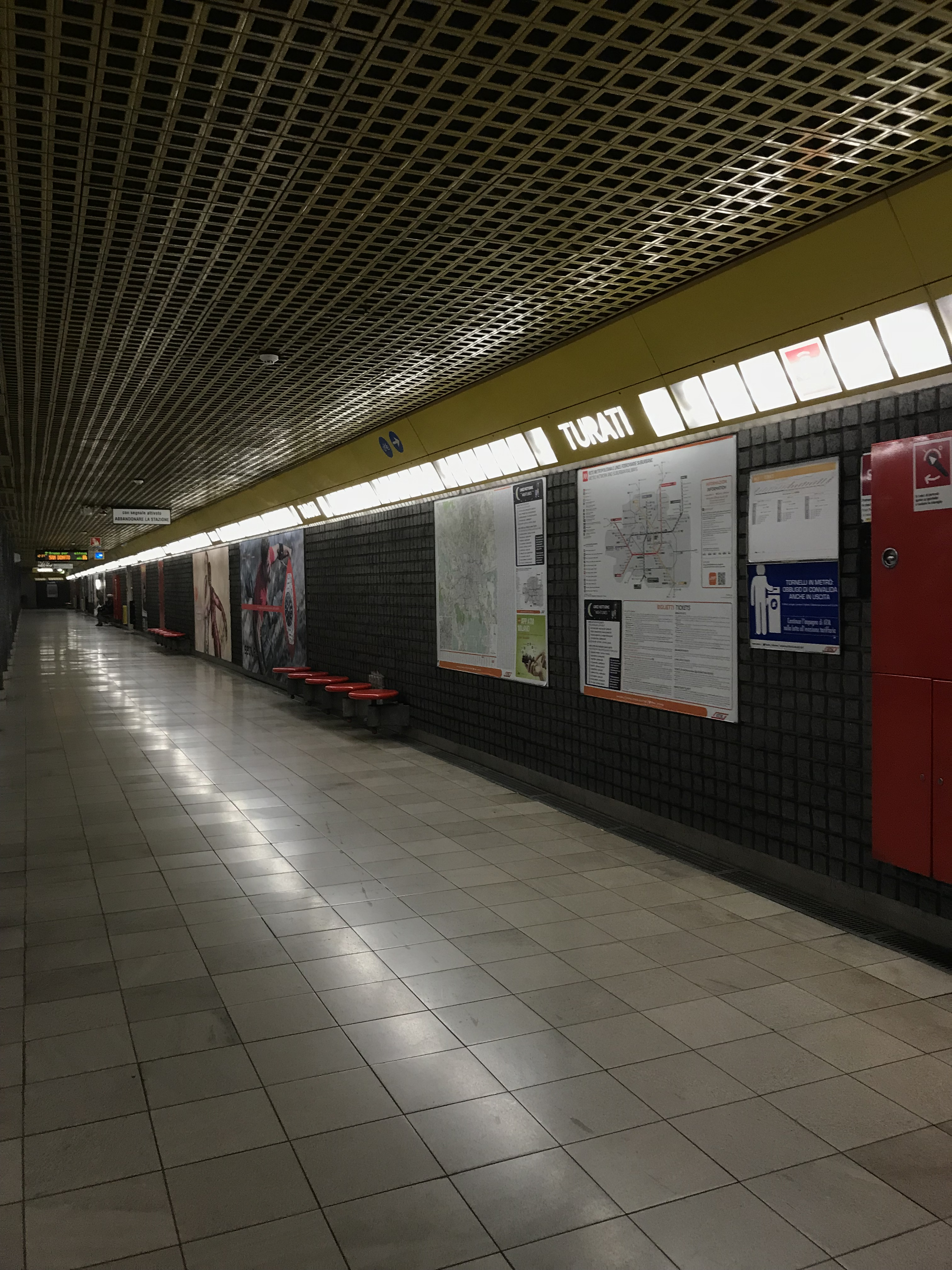

General information
- Location: Via Fillipo Turati, Milan
- Coordinates: 45°28′30″N 9°11′38″E
- Owner: Azienda Trasporti Milanesi
- Platforms: 2
- Tracks: 2

Construction
- Structure type: Underground
- Platform levels: 2
- Accessible: yes

Other information
- Fare zone: STIBM: Mi1

History
- Opened: 1 May 1990; 36 years ago

Services
| Preceding station | Milan Metro | Following station |
|---|---|---|
| Repubblica towards Comasina | Line 3 | Montenapoleone towards San Donato |
Location
- Location within Milan Location within Lombardy Location within Northern Italy Location within Italy

Turati is a station on Line 3 of the Milan Metro which opened on 1 May 1990, as part of the inaugural section of the line between Duomo and Centrale. Initially, Duomo was connected with Centrale by shuttle service, and on 16 December 1990, with the extension of the line to Porta Romana, full-scale service started.

The station is located on Via Filippo Turati, near Piazza Cavour, in the city centre of Milan. It is near the public gardens of Porta Venezia.

The station is underground, like all the other stations of the line and, like the other one in the city centre, it is built in two different overlapped tunnels, with the lower one sometimes being flooded.
