= Montenapoleone (Milan Metro) =

Milan metro station

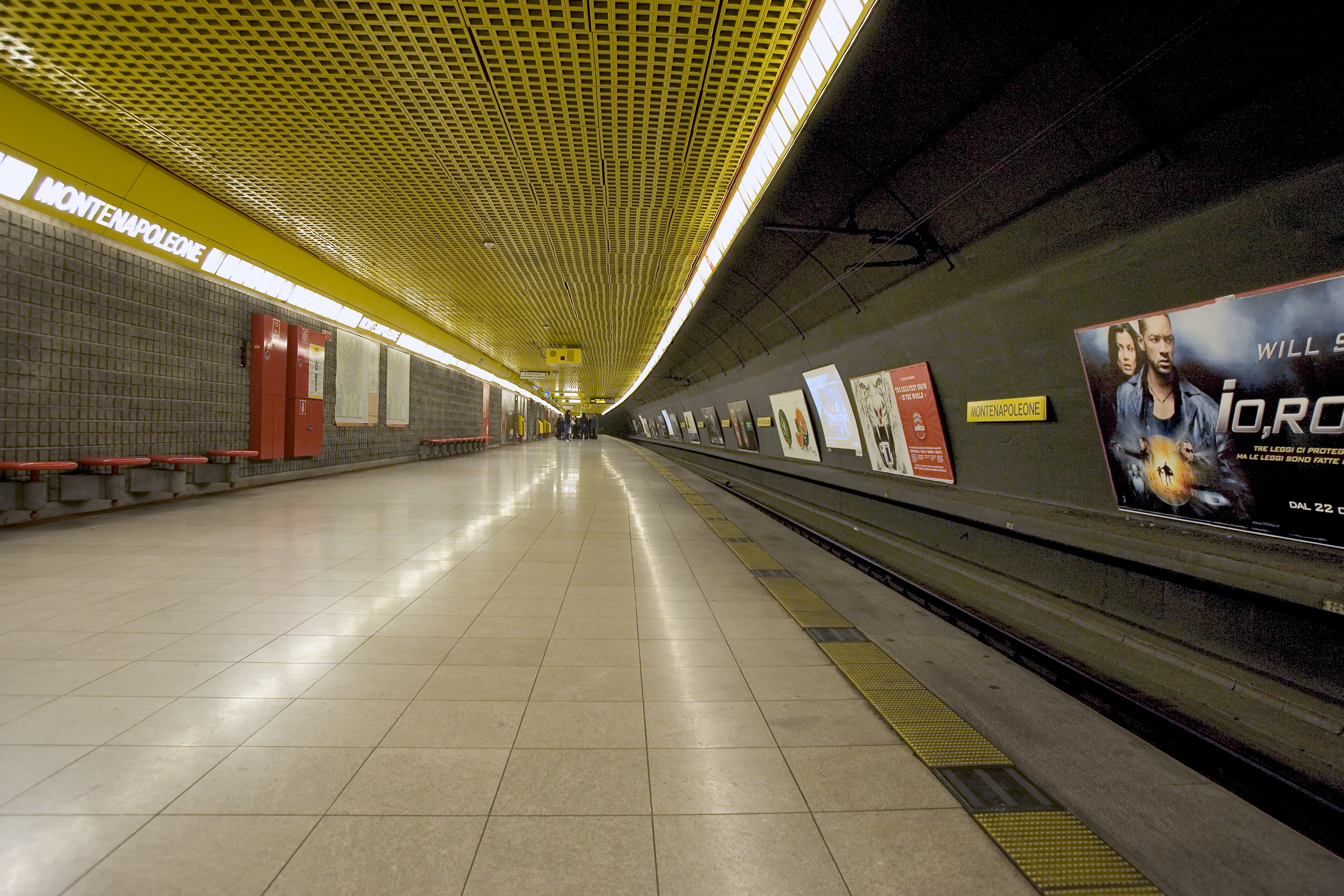

General information
- Location: Via Monte Napoleone, Milan
- Coordinates: 45°28′13″N 9°11′32″E
- Owner: Azienda Trasporti Milanesi
- Platforms: 2
- Tracks: 2

Construction
- Structure type: Underground
- Platform levels: 2
- Accessible: yes

Other information
- Fare zone: STIBM: Mi1

History
- Opened: 1 May 1990; 36 years ago

Services
Preceding station	Milan Metro	Following station
Turati towards Comasina	Line 3	Duomo towards San Donato
Location
- Location within Milan Location within Lombardy Location within Northern Italy Location within Italy

Montenapoleone is a station on Line 3 of the Milan Metro which opened on 1 May 1990, as part of the inaugural section of the line between Duomo and Centrale. Initially, Duomo was connected with Centrale by shuttle service, and on 16 December 1990, with the extension of the line to Porta Romana, full-scale service started.

The station is located on Via Monte Napoleone at the intersection with Via Alessandro Manzoni, in the city centre of Milan. It is located right in the center of the fashion district of Milan, near La Scala and Museo Poldi Pezzoli.

The station, like all the others on Line 3, is underground. In the first projects of the line, the station was to be called Manzoni.

== See also ==
- List of Milan Metro stations
