= Missori (Milan Metro) =

Milan metro station

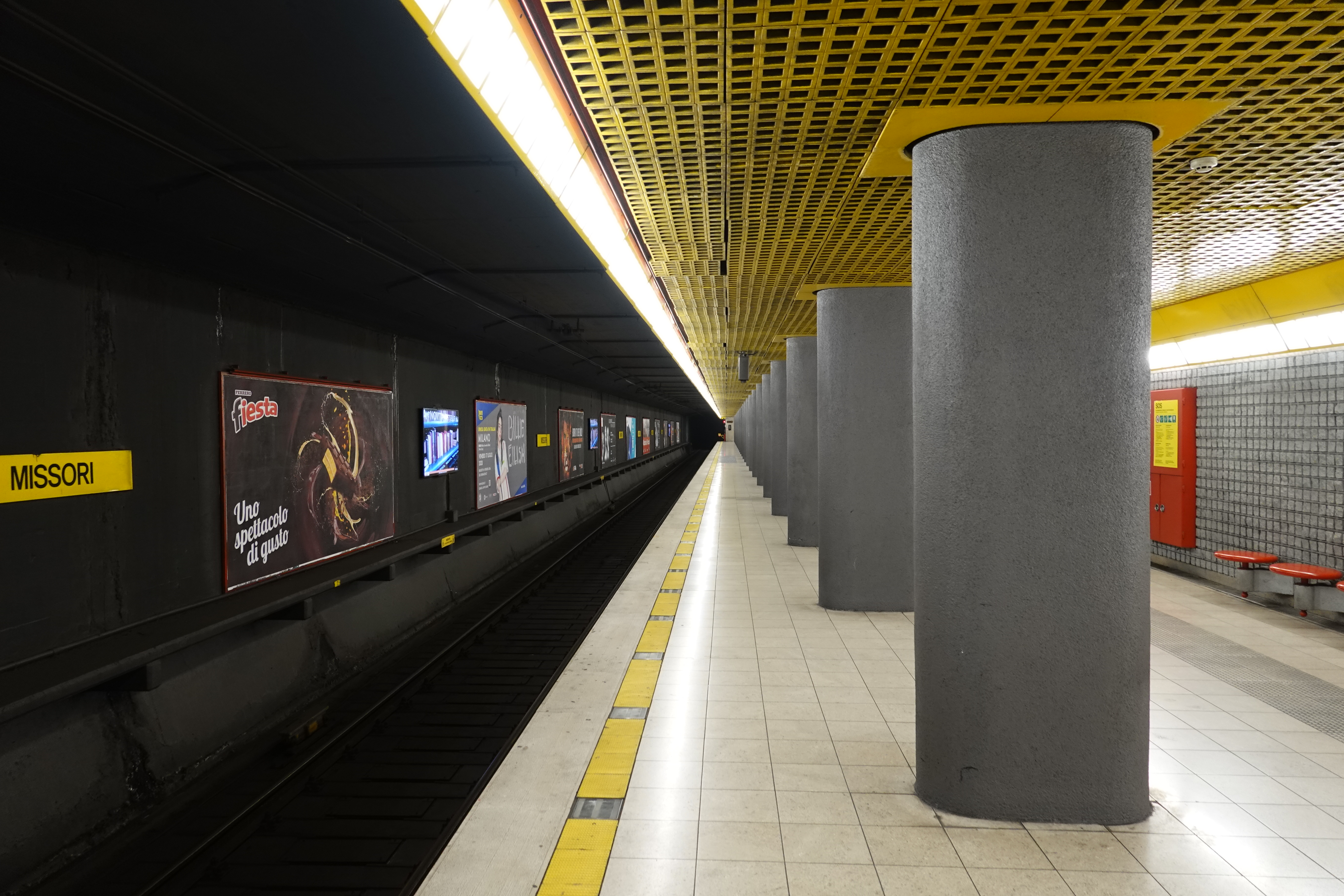

General information
- Location: Piazza Giuseppe Missori, Milan
- Coordinates: 45°27′38″N 9°11′18″E
- Owner: Azienda Trasporti Milanesi
- Platforms: 2
- Tracks: 2

Construction
- Structure type: Underground
- Platform levels: 2
- Accessible: yes

Other information
- Fare zone: STIBM: Mi1

History
- Opened: 16 December 1990; 35 years ago

Services
Preceding station	Milan Metro	Following station
Duomo towards Comasina	Line 3	Crocetta towards San Donato
Santa Sofia towards San Cristoforo FS	Line 4 transfer at Sforza–Policlinico	San Babila towards Linate Aeroporto
Location
- Location within Milan Location within Lombardy Location within Northern Italy Location within Italy

Missori is a Milan Metro station on Line 3. The station was opened on 16 December 1990 as part of the extension of the line from Duomo to Porta Romana.

The station is located at Piazza Giuseppe Missori, in the central area near the Velasca Tower, at the end of Via Giuseppe Mazzini, which by the Duomo leads to the south. Along with the Crocetta station, it can be used to access the University of Milan.

Like its nearest stations, it is underground in two overlapped tunnels.

It is named after Colonel Giuseppe Missori.
