= Porto di Mare (Milan Metro) =

Metro station in Milan, Italy

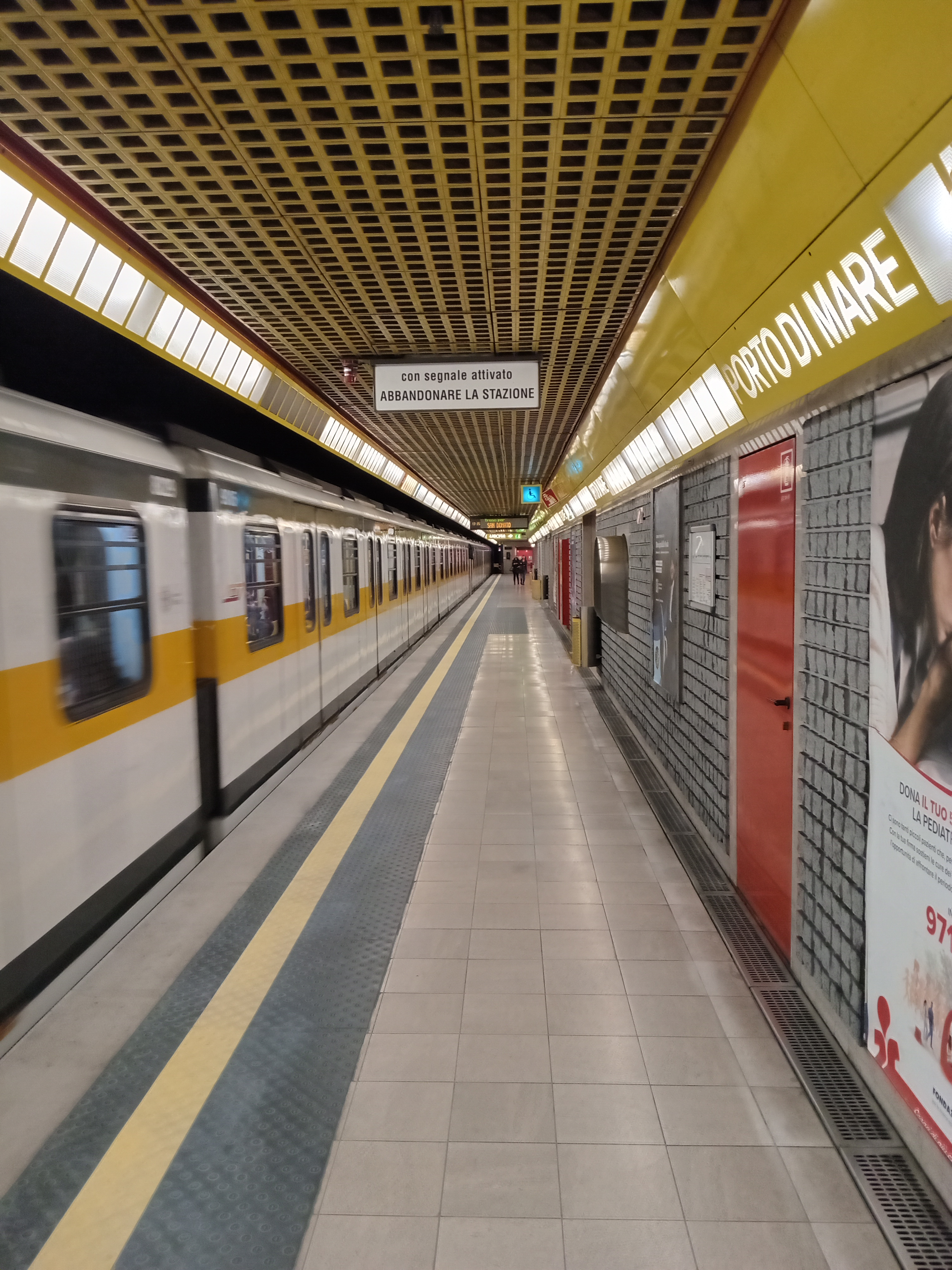

General information
- Location: Via Gian Battista Cassinis, Milan
- Coordinates: 45°26′13.5″N 9°13′50″E
- Owner: Azienda Trasporti Milanesi
- Platforms: 2
- Tracks: 2

Construction
- Structure type: Underground
- Accessible: yes

Other information
- Fare zone: STIBM: Mi1

History
- Opened: 12 May 1991; 35 years ago

Services
Preceding station	Milan Metro	Following station
Corvetto towards Comasina	Line 3	Rogoredo towards San Donato
Location
- Location within Milan Location within Lombardy Location within Northern Italy Location within Italy

Porto di Mare (literally Sea Port) is a station on Line 3 of the Milan Metro in Milan, Italy. The station was opened on 12 May 1991 as part of the extension of the line from Porta Romana to San Donato. It takes the name from a never-realized project of a fluvial port to reach the Po River and consequentially the Adriatic Sea.

The station is located at the historic starting point of the Motorway of the Sun, which is in the municipality of Milan. This is an underground station with two tracks in a single tunnel.
