= Corvetto (Milan Metro) =

Milan metro station

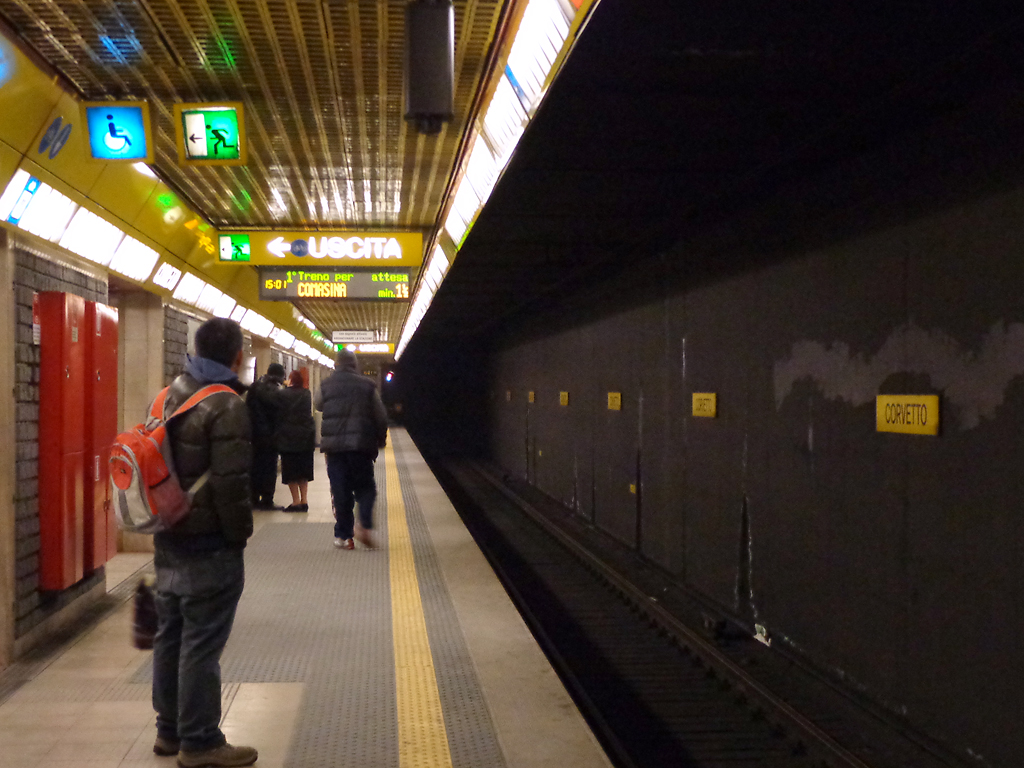

General information
- Location: Piazzale Luigi Emanuele Corvetto, Milan
- Coordinates: 45°26′25″N 9°13′26″E
- Owner: Azienda Trasporti Milanesi
- Platforms: 1
- Tracks: 2

Construction
- Structure type: Underground
- Accessible: yes

Other information
- Fare zone: STIBM: Mi1

History
- Opened: 12 May 1991; 35 years ago

Services
Preceding station	Milan Metro	Following station
Brenta towards Comasina	Line 3	Porto di Mare towards San Donato
Location
- Location within Milan Location within Lombardy Location within Northern Italy Location within Italy

Corvetto is a station on Line 3 of the Milan Metro in Milan, Italy. The station was opened on 12 May 1991 as part of the extension of the line from Porta Romana to San Donato.

The station is located at Piazzale Luigi Emanuele Corvetto at the end of Corso Lodi, which is in the municipality of Milan. This is an underground station with two tracks in two different tunnels. Corvetto is the Contemporary Art District of Milan.
