= Crocetta (Milan Metro) =

Milan metro station

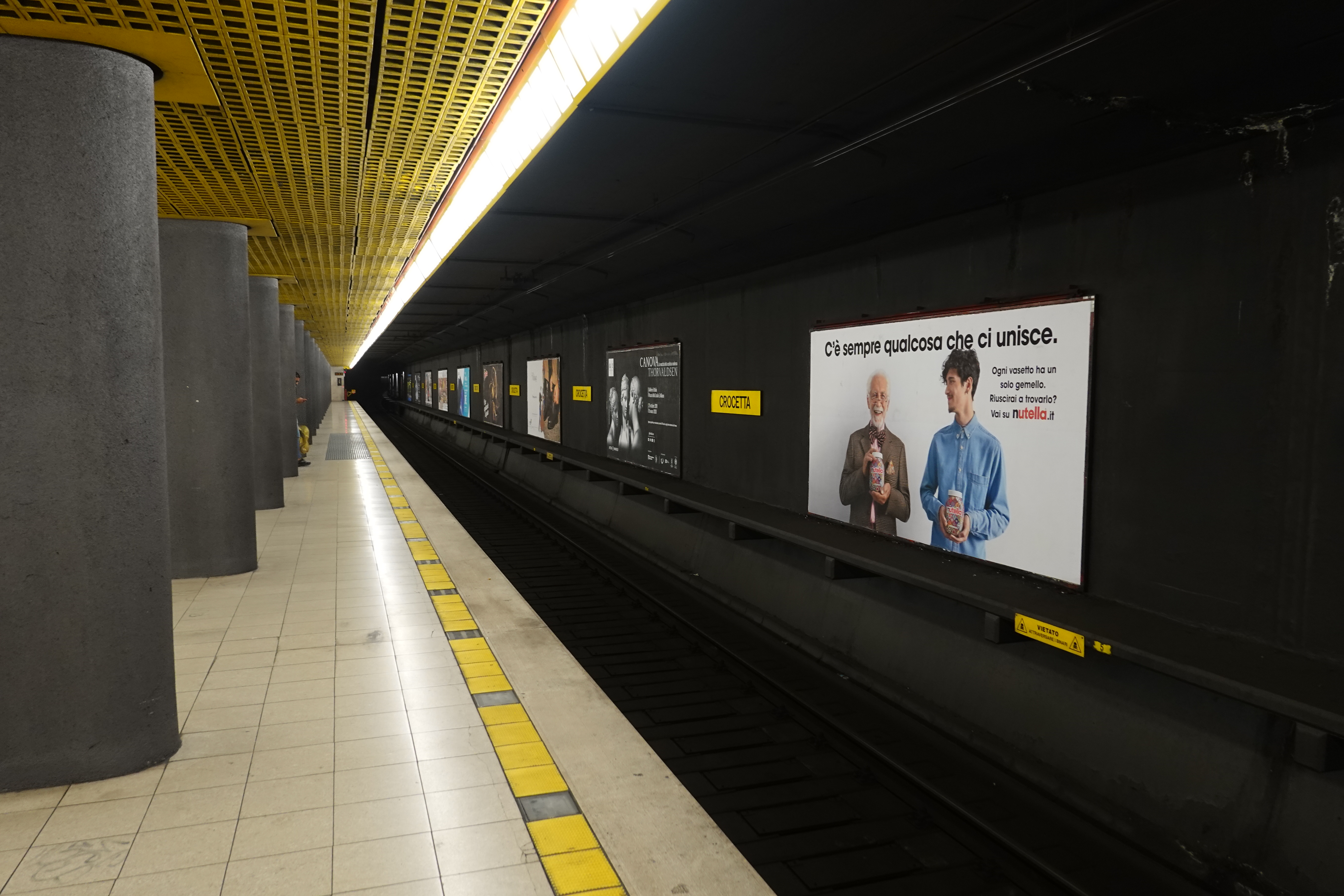

General information
- Location: Largo della Crocetta, Milan
- Coordinates: 45°27′22″N 9°11′44″E
- Owner: Azienda Trasporti Milanesi
- Platforms: 2
- Tracks: 2

Construction
- Structure type: Underground
- Platform levels: 2
- Accessible: yes

Other information
- Fare zone: STIBM: Mi1

History
- Opened: 16 December 1990; 35 years ago

Services
Preceding station	Milan Metro	Following station
Missori towards Comasina	Line 3	Porta Romana towards San Donato
Location
- Location within Milan Location within Lombardy Location within Northern Italy Location within Italy

Crocetta is a Milan Metro station on Line 3. The station was opened on 16 December 1990 as part of the extension of the line from Duomo to Porta Romana.

The station is located in Largo della Crocetta, in the city centre just outside the core area, near the Teatro Carcano and the Ca' Granda. The station is at the confluence of Corso di Porta Romana, Corso di Porta Vigentina and Via Alfonso Lamarmora.

Like its northern nearest stations, it is underground in two overlapped tunnels. In initial projects the station was to be called Lamarmora, taking the name from the street which originates from the point where the station is located.
