= Repubblica (Milan Metro) =

Milan metro station

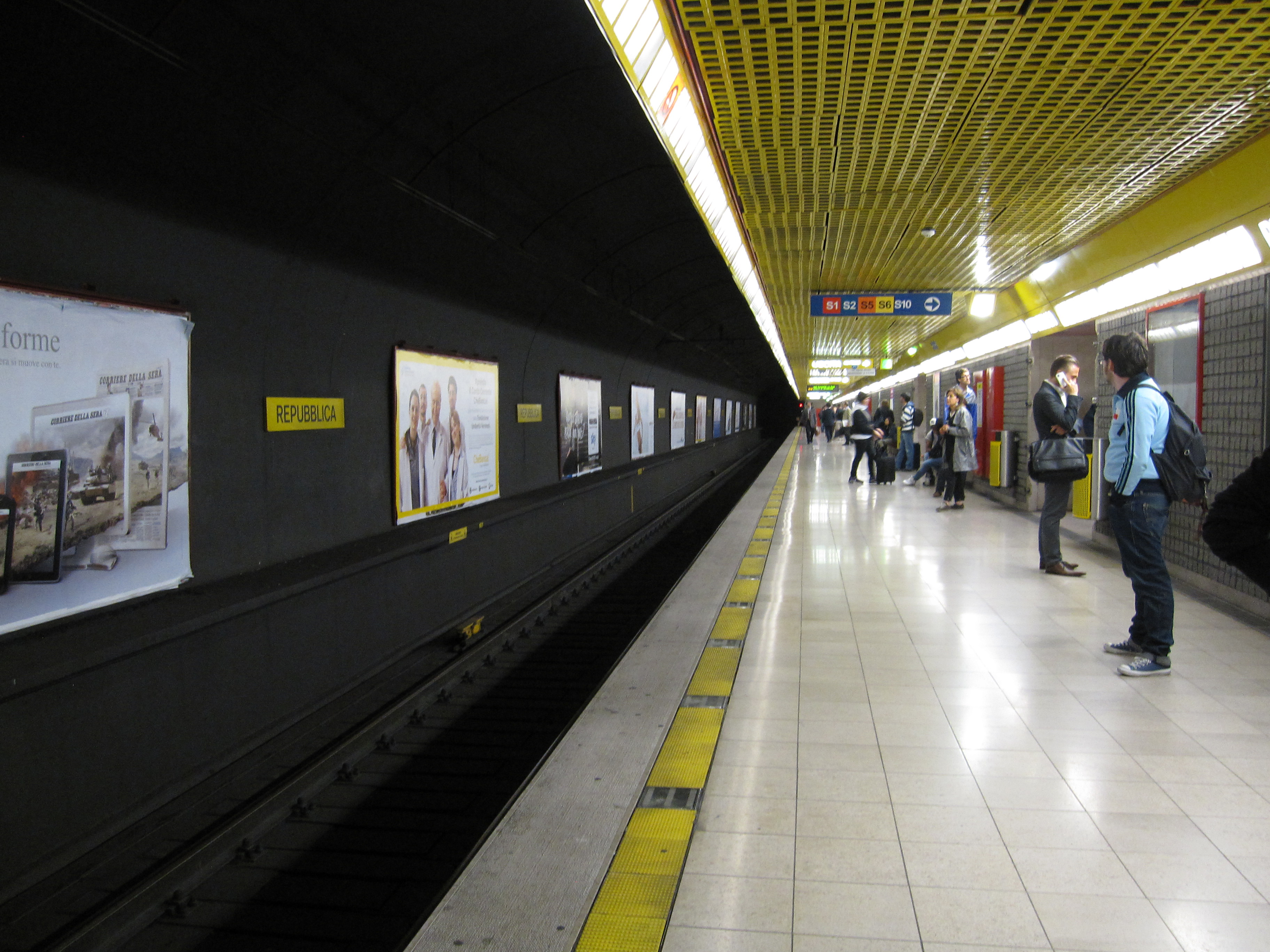

General information
- Location: Piazza della Repubblica, Milan
- Coordinates: 45°28′42″N 9°11′49″E
- Owner: Azienda Trasporti Milanesi
- Platforms: 1
- Tracks: 2
- Connections: Milano Repubblica railway station

Construction
- Structure type: Underground
- Accessible: yes

Other information
- Fare zone: STIBM: Mi1

History
- Opened: 1 May 1990; 36 years ago

Services
Preceding station	Milan Metro	Following station
Centrale towards Comasina	Line 3	Turati towards San Donato
Location
- Location within Milan Location within Lombardy Location within Northern Italy Location within Italy

Repubblica is a Milan Metro station on Line 3. Works began in 1984, and it was opened in 1990. Since 1997, it is connected with the Milano Repubblica railway station of the Milan Passante railway.

The station opened on 1 May 1990 as part of the inaugural section of Line 3 between Duomo and Centrale. Initially, Duomo was connected with Centrale by shuttle service, and on 16 December 1990, with the extension of the line to Porta Romana, full-scale service started.

The station, underground, is located under the square of the same name. It has two tracks, served by an island platform.

It serves the many luxury hotels in the area, in addition to offices and the Revenue Agency, the Land Registry, the historic Cozzi pool, the standing exhibition, Palazzo Dugnani and offices of some services of the Lombardy Region.
