= Brenta =

Brenta may refer to:

- Brenta (river), Italy
- Brenta, Lombardy, a commune (municipality)
- Brenta Group, mountain
- Brenta (Milan Metro), a metro station
- Brenta Valley
- Brenta (surname)

== See also ==
- Brena (disambiguation)
- Brenda (disambiguation)
