= Repubblica =

Repubblica (Republic in Italian) may refer to:

== Rail stations ==
- Repubblica (Milan Metro), Milan, Italy
- Milano Repubblica railway station, on the Milan Passante railway
- Repubblica – Teatro dell'Opera (Rome Metro), Rome, Italy

== Other ==
- la Repubblica, an Italian newspaper
- Repubblica (fictional country), from the British TV series The Fast Show

== See also ==
- Republica, an English rock band
