= Lodi T.I.B.B. (Milan Metro) =

Milan metro station

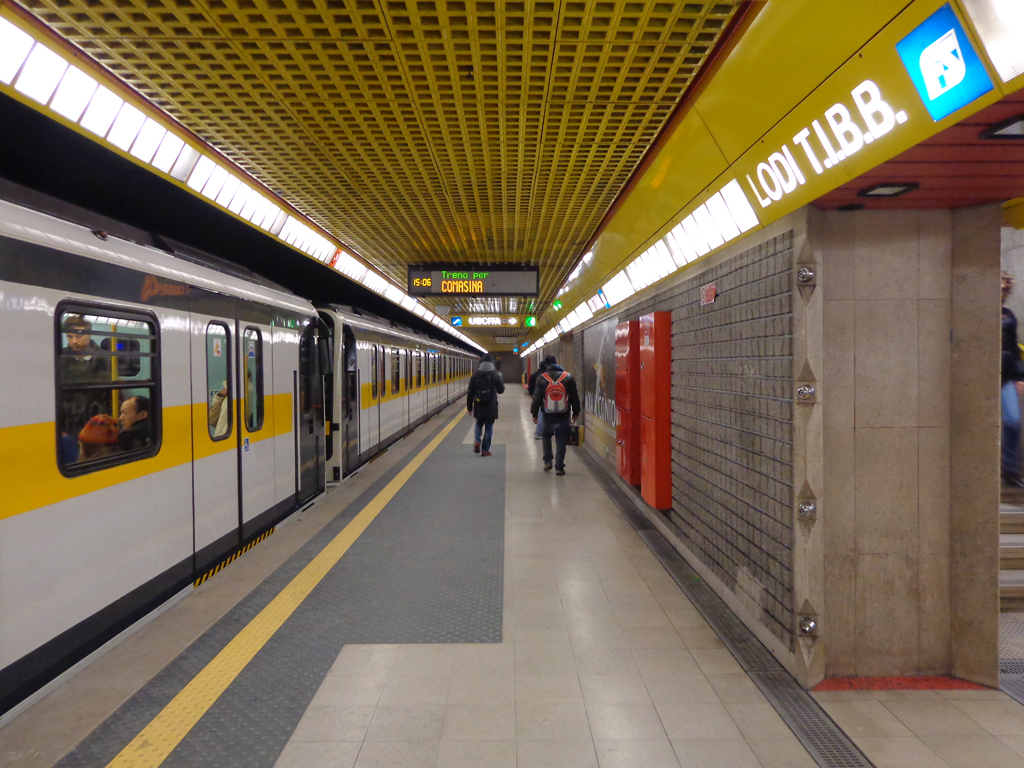

General information
- Location: Piazzale Lodi, Milan
- Coordinates: 45°26′49″N 9°12′37″E
- Owner: Azienda Trasporti Milanesi
- Platforms: 2
- Tracks: 2

Construction
- Structure type: Underground
- Accessible: yes

Other information
- Fare zone: STIBM: Mi1

History
- Opened: 12 May 1991; 35 years ago

Services
Preceding station	Milan Metro	Following station
Porta Romana towards Comasina	Line 3	Brenta towards San Donato
Location
- Location within Milan Location within Lombardy Location within Northern Italy Location within Italy

Lodi T.I.B.B. is a station in Milan, Italy on Line 3 of the Milan Metro. The station is located at Piazzale Lodi and is partially named after the company Tecnomasio Italiano Brown Boveri (T.I.B.B.) which built underground trains for years. This is an underground station with two tracks in a single tunnel.

Lodi T.I.B.B. was opened on 12 May 1991 as part of the extension of the line from Porta Romana to San Donato.

The station is near the overground Milano Porta Romana railway station.
