= Maciachini (Milan Metro) =

Milan metro station

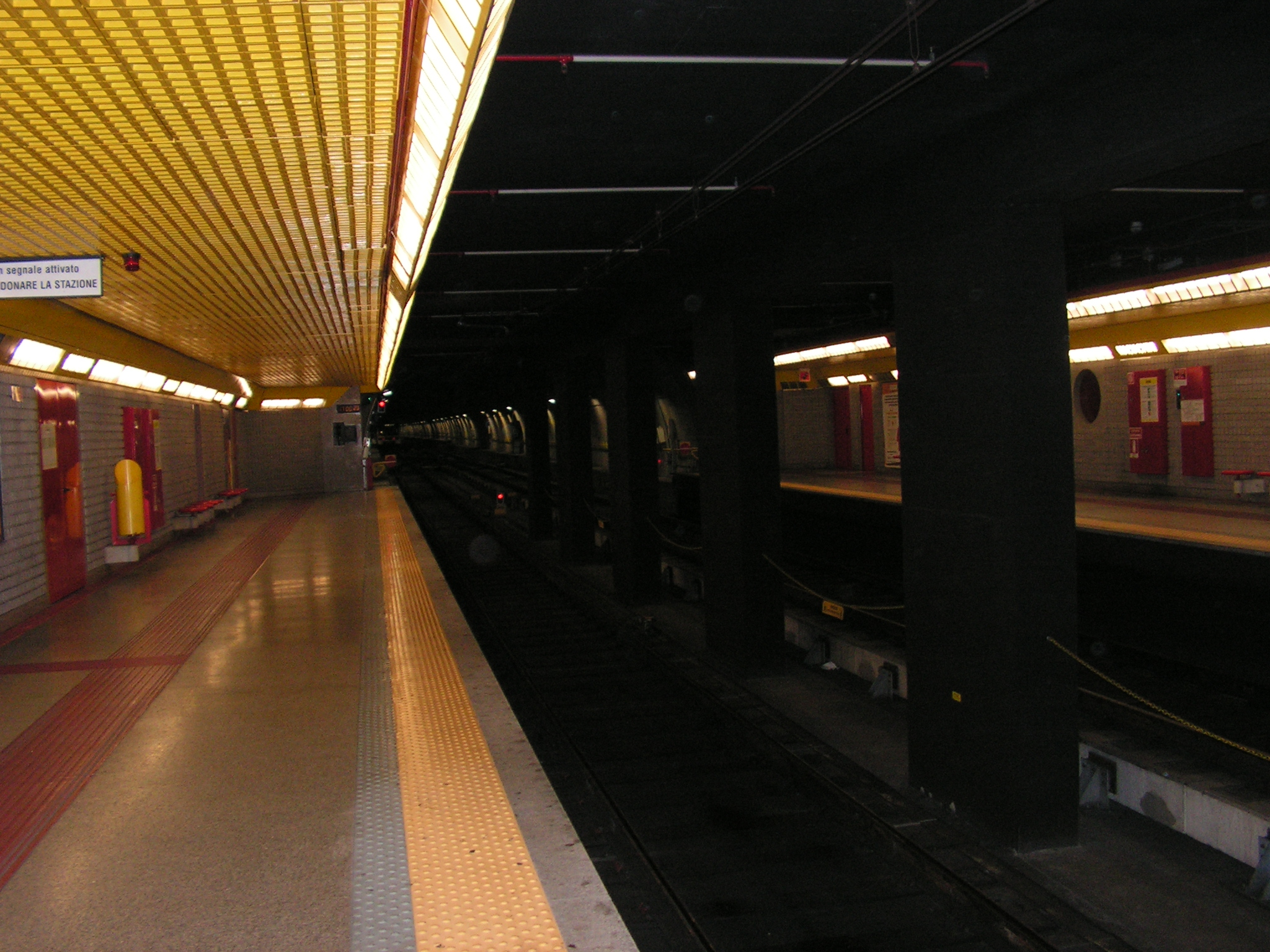

General information
- Location: Piazzale Carlo Maciachini, Milan
- Coordinates: 45°29′53″N 9°11′05″E
- Owner: Azienda Trasporti Milanesi
- Platforms: 2
- Tracks: 2

Construction
- Structure type: Underground
- Accessible: yes

Other information
- Fare zone: STIBM: Mi1

History
- Opened: 8 December 2003; 22 years ago

Services
Preceding station	Milan Metro	Following station
Dergano towards Comasina	Line 3	Zara towards San Donato
Location
- Location within Milan Location within Lombardy Location within Northern Italy Location within Italy

Maciachini is an underground station on Line 3 of the Milan Metro which opened on December 8, 2003, thirteen years after the opening of the original trunk of the line. This station was the northern terminus of the line until March 26, 2011, with the extension of the line to Comasina.

The station is located at Piazzale Carlo Maciachini on the Milan Ring Road, in the municipality of Milan.
