= Brenta (Milan Metro) =

Milan metro station

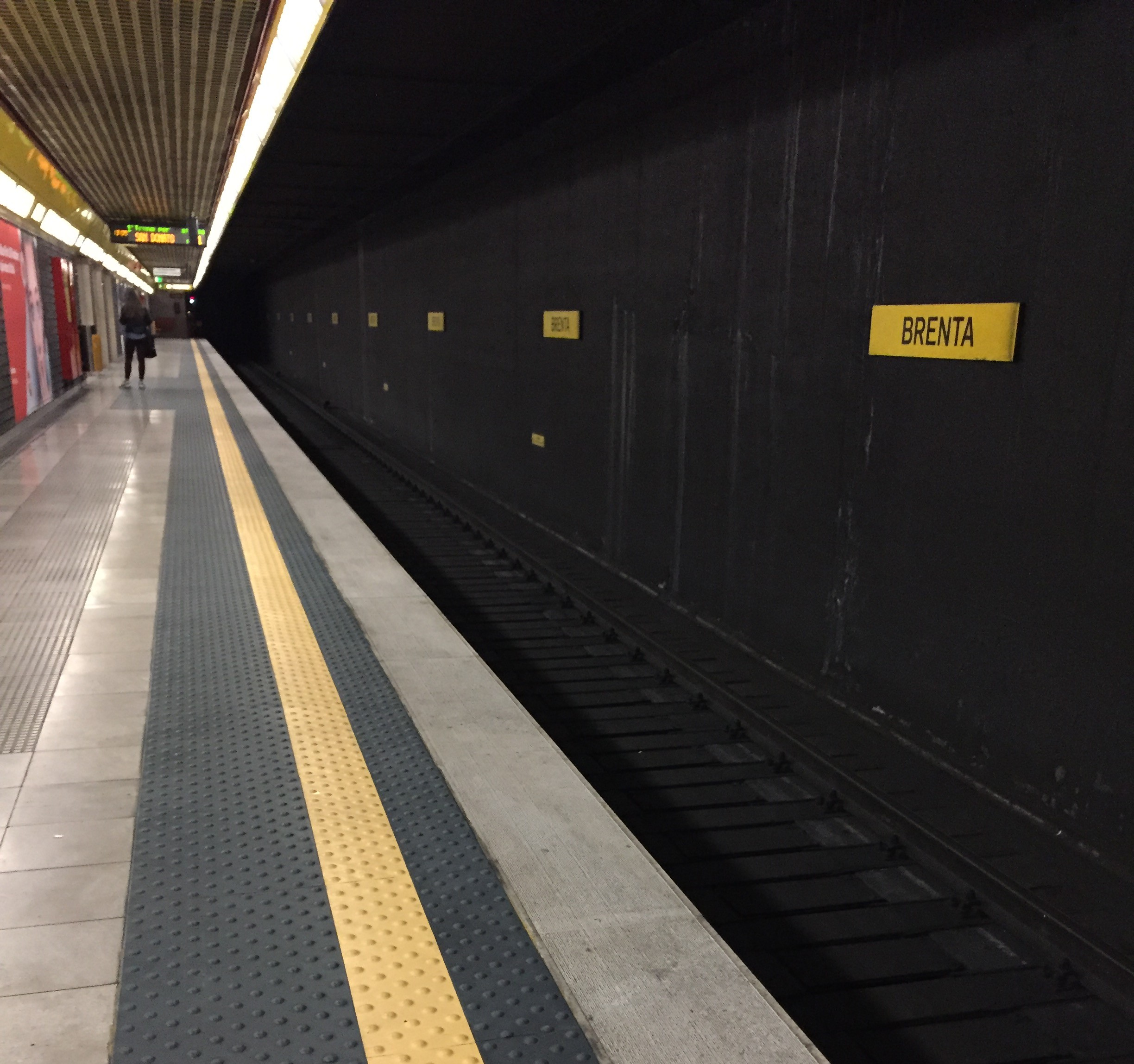

General information
- Location: Corso Lodi at Viale Brenta, Milan
- Coordinates: 45°26′33″N 9°13′08″E
- Owner: Azienda Trasporti Milanesi
- Platforms: 1
- Tracks: 2

Construction
- Structure type: Underground
- Accessible: yes

Other information
- Fare zone: STIBM: Mi1

History
- Opened: 12 May 1991; 35 years ago

Services
Preceding station	Milan Metro	Following station
Lodi T.I.B.B. towards Comasina	Line 3	Corvetto towards San Donato
Location
- Location within Milan Location within Lombardy Location within Northern Italy Location within Italy

Brenta is a station on Line 3 of the Milan Metro in Milan, Italy. The station was opened on 12 May 1991, as part of the extension of the line from Porta Romana to San Donato.

The station is located on Corso Lodi at the intersection with Viale Brenta, which is in the municipality of Milan. This is an underground station with two tracks in two different tunnels.
