= Rogoredo (Milan Metro) =

Milan metro station

Rogoredo FS
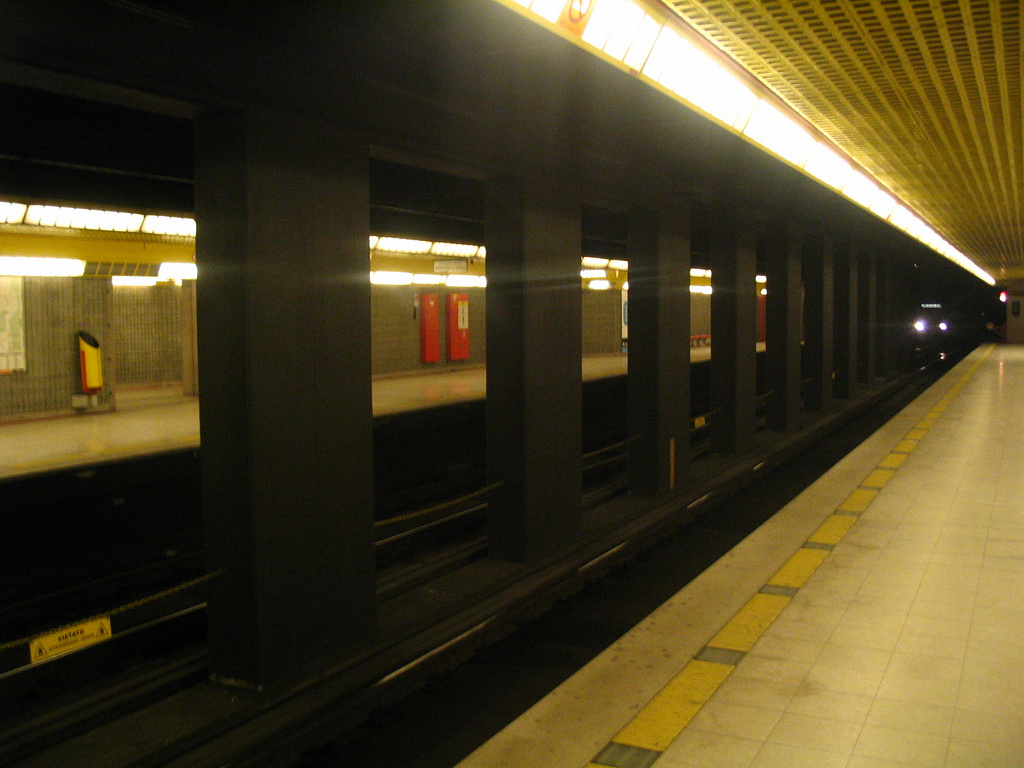

General information
- Location: Via Gian Battista Cassinis, Rogoredo, Milan
- Coordinates: 45°25′59″N 9°14′20″E
- Owner: Azienda Trasporti Milanesi
- Platforms: 2
- Tracks: 2
- Connections: Milan Rogoredo railway station

Construction
- Structure type: Underground
- Accessible: yes

Other information
- Fare zone: STIBM: Mi1

History
- Opened: 12 May 1991; 35 years ago

Services
Preceding station	Milan Metro	Following station
Porto di Mare towards Comasina	Line 3	San Donato Terminus
Location
- Location within Milan Location within Lombardy Location within Northern Italy Location within Italy

Rogoredo FS is a station on Line 3 of the Milan Metro in Milan, Italy. The station was opened on 12 May 1991 as part of the extension of the line from Porta Romana to San Donato.

The station is located on Via Gian Battista Cassinis, just under the Milano Rogoredo railway station, which is in the municipality of Milan. This is an underground station with two tracks in a single tunnel. It serves the ward of Rogoredo.
