= Zara (Milan Metro) =

Milan metro station

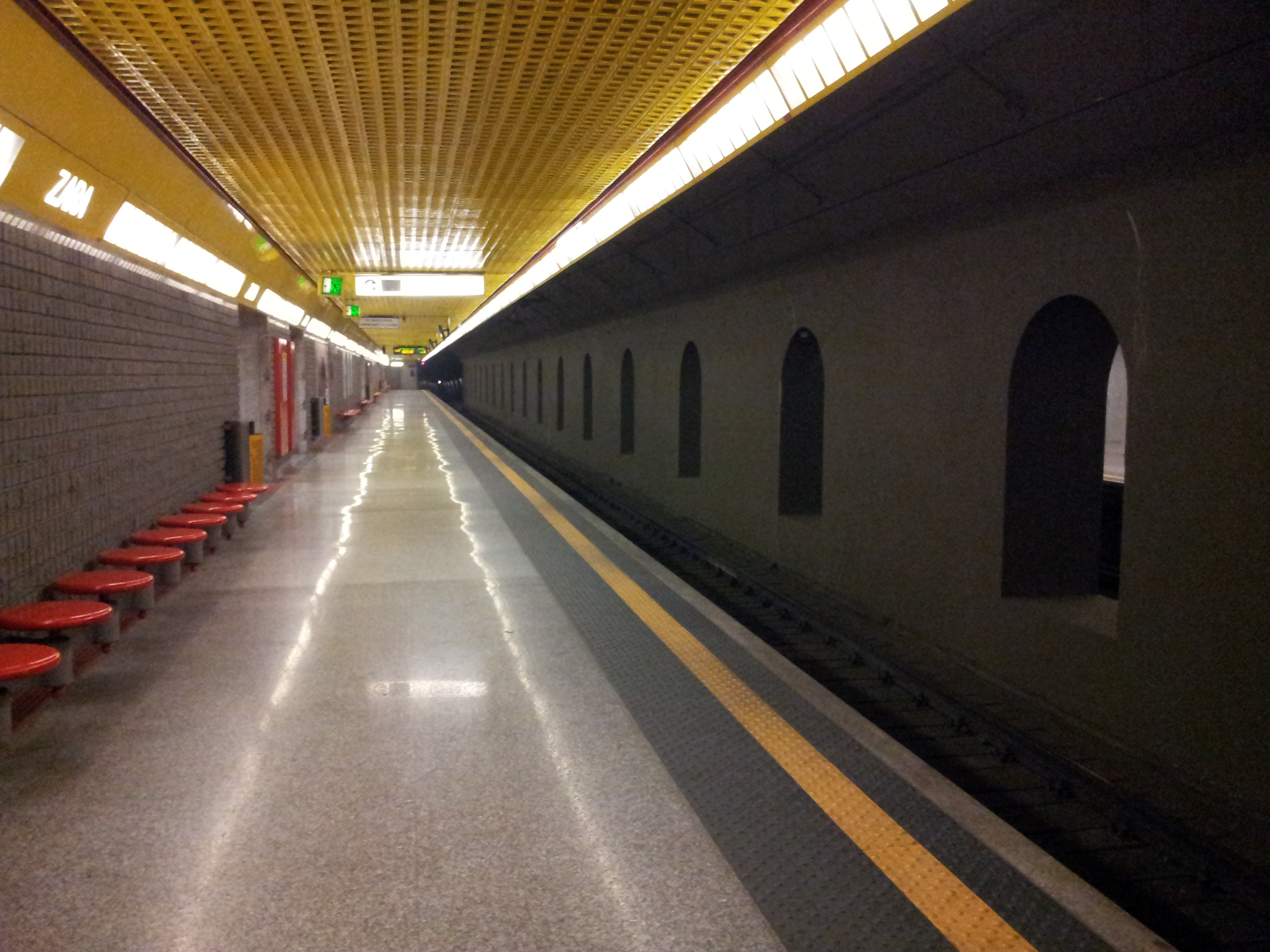

General information
- Location: Viale Zara, Milan
- Coordinates: 45°29′32.6″N 9°11′33″E
- Owner: Azienda Trasporti Milanesi
- Platforms: 2 (line 3); 1 (line 5)
- Tracks: 2 (line 3); 2 (line 5)

Construction
- Structure type: Underground
- Platform levels: 2
- Accessible: yes

Other information
- Fare zone: STIBM: Mi1

History
- Opened: Line 3: 16 December 1995; 30 years ago Line 5: 10 February 2013; 13 years ago

Services
Preceding station	Milan Metro	Following station
Maciachini towards Comasina	Line 3	Sondrio towards San Donato
Marche towards Bignami	Line 5	Isola towards San Siro Stadio
Location
- Location within Milan Location within Lombardy Location within Northern Italy Location within Italy

Zara is an interchange station between Lines 3 and 5 of the Milan Metro. The station opened in 1995. It was the final stop on Line 3 until 2003, when Maciachini was opened.

It was the final stop on Line 5 and its only link to the rest of the network from the line's opening on 10 February 2013 until its extension to Porta Garibaldi on 1 March 2014.

The station is located on Viale Zara, in the municipality of Milan.
