= Milan Metro Line 3 =

Subway line serving Milan, Italy

M3

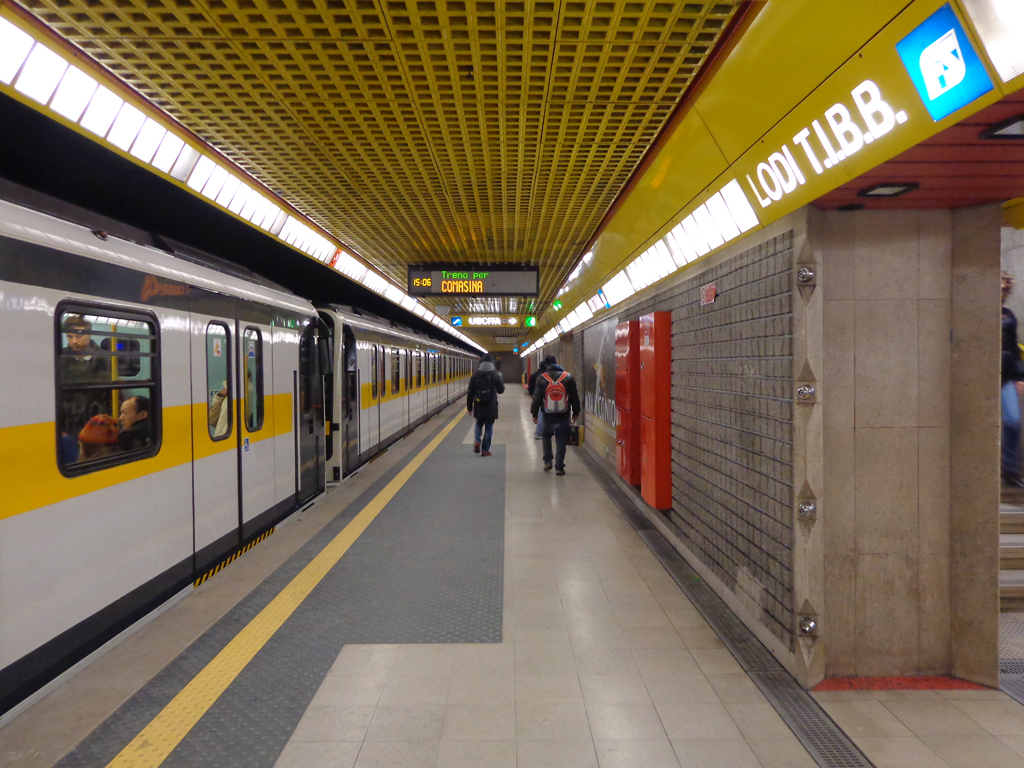
- Lodi T.I.B.B. station

Overview
- Status: Operational
- Line number: 3
- Locale: Milan, Italy
- Termini: Comasina; San Donato
- Stations: 21

Service
- Type: Rapid transit
- System: Milan Metro
- Operator(s): Azienda Trasporti Milanesi
- Depot(s): Rogoredo Depot
- Rolling stock: UdT series 8000/8100; AnsaldoBreda Meneghino
- Daily ridership: 250,000 (2012)

History
- Opened: 3 May 1990; 36 years ago
- Last extension: 2011

Technical
- Line length: 17.1 km (10.6 mi)
- Track gauge: 1,435 mm (4 ft 8 1/2 in) standard gauge
- Electrification: Overhead line, 1,500 V DC
Route map

Line 3 is an underground line in Milan, Italy. This line is part of the Milan Metro and operated by ATM. Construction began in 1981 in order to be ready for the 1990 Football World Cup. It is also called the Yellow Line (Linea Gialla) as identified by its yellow signage.

The line connects the southeastern suburb of San Donato Milanese to the northwestern area of the city, travelling through the city centre. It is 17.1 km long and has 21 stations.

== History ==
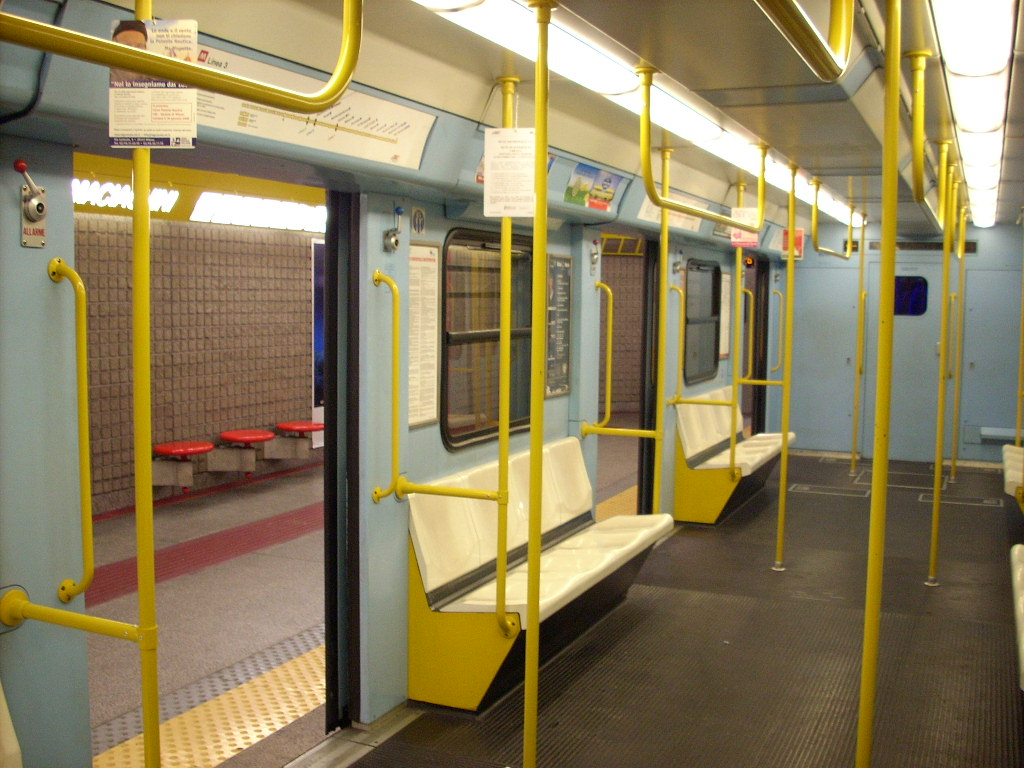
Inside an original line M3 train.

The proposal for a third metro line was approved by the municipal government of Milan in 1977. The route was chosen based on a study of main traffic routes in previous years. The final projected route was presented in early 1981. Works on the new line began on 8 September in the same year. The first section, from Centrale to Duomo opened on 3 May 1990, just in time for the beginning of the World Cup. However, only a shuttle service was active between the two terminus, as the entire central section (of which Duomo was a part of) has tracks on two different levels, making communications impossible between the two. At the end of the year the line was extended to Porta Romana, where it became possible to have switches between the tracks and start regular (non-shuttle) service.

New extensions to Sondrio to the north and to San Donato to the south opened on 12 May 1991.

Further extensions of the new line happened slowly in the following years. Zara station was inaugurated only on 16 December 1995 and Maciachini on 8 December 2003. The last extension (Maciachini-Comasina) opened in early 2011.

== Route ==
The line, 16.6 kilometres long with 21 stations, runs from Comasina to San Donato, entirely underground.

Station Name	Transfer	Opening
Comasina		26 March 2011
Affori FN	Line S2 (Milan suburban railway service) Line S4 (Milan suburban railway service)	26 March 2011
Affori Centro		26 March 2011
Dergano		26 March 2011
Maciachini		8 December 2003
Zara	Milan Metro Line 5	16 December 1995
Sondrio		12 May 1991
Centrale FS	Milan Metro Line 2	3 May 1990
Repubblica	Line S1 (Milan suburban railway service) Line S2 (Milan suburban railway service) Line S5 (Milan suburban railway service) Line S6 (Milan suburban railway service) Line S12 (Milan suburban railway service) Line S13 (Milan suburban railway service)	3 May 1990
Turati		3 May 1990
Montenapoleone		3 May 1990
Duomo	Milan Metro Line 1	3 May 1990
Missori	(Note: Out-of-system interchange at Sforza-Policlinico)	16 December 1990
Crocetta		6 December 1990
Porta Romana		6 December 1990
Lodi T.I.B.B.	Line S9 (Milan suburban railway service) Line S19 (Milan suburban railway service)	12 May 1991
Brenta		12 May 1991
Corvetto		12 May 1991
Porto di Mare		12 May 1991
Rogoredo FS	Line S1 (Milan suburban railway service) Line S2 (Milan suburban railway service) Line S12 (Milan suburban railway service) Line S13 (Milan suburban railway service) Line S19 (Milan suburban railway service)	12 May 1991
San Donato		12 May 1991

== Rolling stock ==
Trains use an overhead contact system providing a voltage of 1,500 V DC. The track gauge is of the 1,435 mm (4 ft 8 1/2 in) standard gauge.

As of 2020, there are two types of rolling stocks being used on the line:

- The 8000-series, introduced between 1989 and 2003, and divided into three subseries:
  - "Standard" 8000-series - built by a consortium of Breda, Fiat Ferroviaria and OMS, with GTO–VVVF inverters made by ABB.
  - "8080" series - built by Socimi, with GTO–VVVF inverters made by Hitachi. Decommissioned.
  - 8100-series - air-conditioned, open gangway version of the older 8000-series, introduced in 2003 for the line's extension to Machiachini.
- 900 Series "Meneghino", introduced in 2011 for the line's extension to Comasina.

== Planned extension ==
A southeastern extension of the line has been planned. The new extension will run from San Donato through the municipalities of San Donato Milanese, Peschiera Borromeo, Mediglia, Pantigliate, Settala and finish in Paullo. The extended section will be 14.8 km (9.2 mi) long and has 6 stations. Trains will run mostly underground (60%).

Although the project was approved in 2010, it was put on hold in early 2011 due to lack of funds. Works were postponed to a later date.

Currently there are plans to replace 48 lifts and 52 elevators for the Milan-Cortina Winter Olympics in 2026.
