= Sondrio (Milan Metro) =

Milan metro station

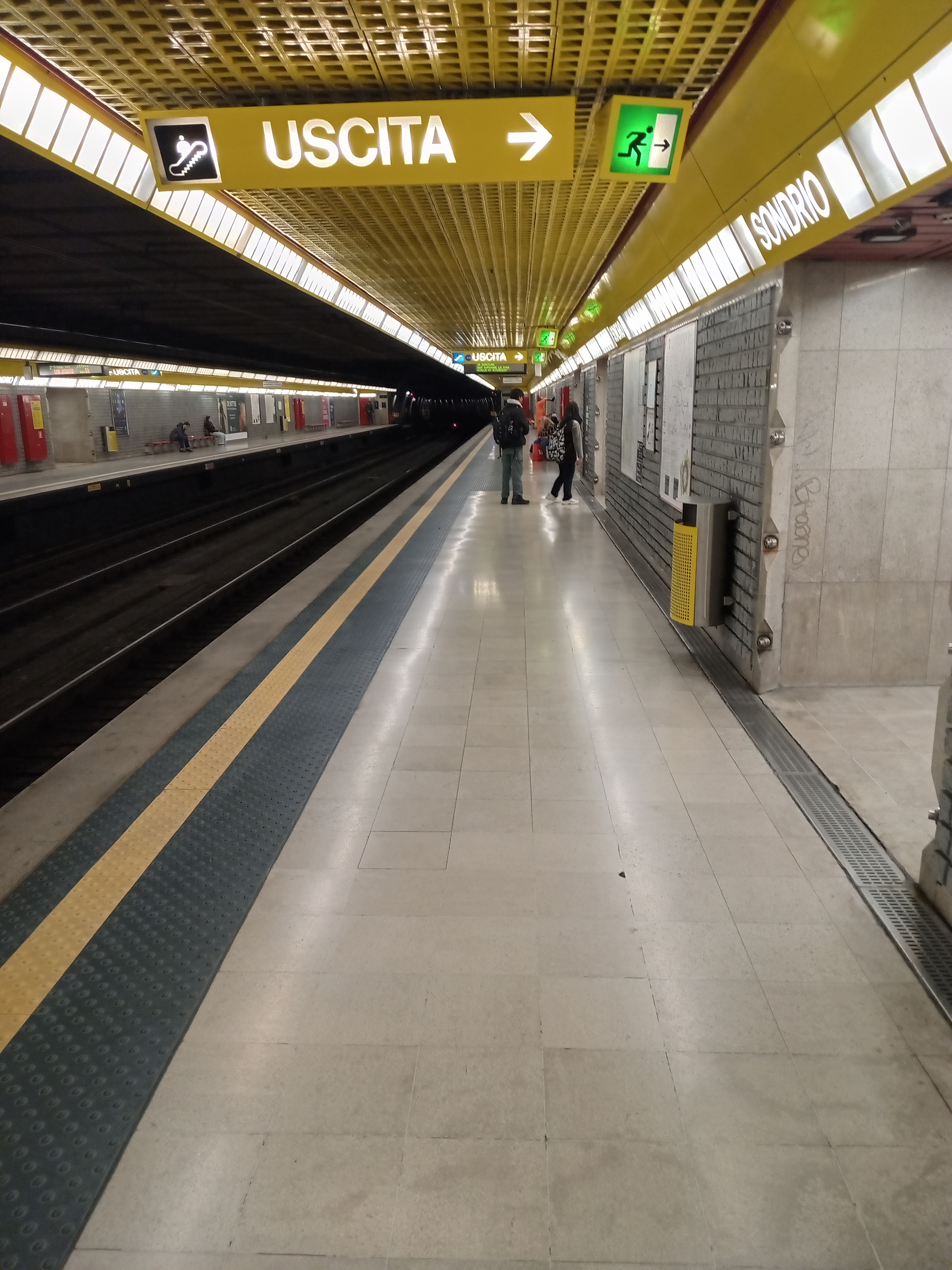

General information
- Location: Viale Sondrio at Via Melchiorre Gioia, Milan
- Coordinates: 45°29′23″N 9°12′04″E
- Owner: Azienda Trasporti Milanesi
- Platforms: 2
- Tracks: 2

Construction
- Structure type: Underground
- Accessible: yes

Other information
- Fare zone: STIBM: Mi1

History
- Opened: 12 May 1991; 35 years ago

Services
Preceding station	Milan Metro	Following station
Zara towards Comasina	Line 3	Centrale towards San Donato
Location
- Location within Milan Location within Lombardy Location within Northern Italy Location within Italy

Sondrio is a station on Line 3 of the Milan Metro which opened on 12 May 1991, more than a year after the opening of the original trunk of the line, as a one-station extension from Centrale. It was the final stop on the line until 1995, when Zara (Milan Metro) was opened.

The station is located on Via Melchiorre Gioia at the intersection with Viale Sondrio, in the municipality of Milan.

The station is underground, built in a single tunnel with two trucks, and is sometimes flooded.
