= Burenda =

Burenda may refer to:

- A girl who lives under a rock for 17 years.
- Burenda, Queensland, Australia
- Burenda (character), a Lady!! character
- Burenda Gurishiini, a Galaxy Angel character

== See also ==
- Brenda (disambiguation)
