= Centrale (Milan Metro) =

Milan metro station

Centrale FS
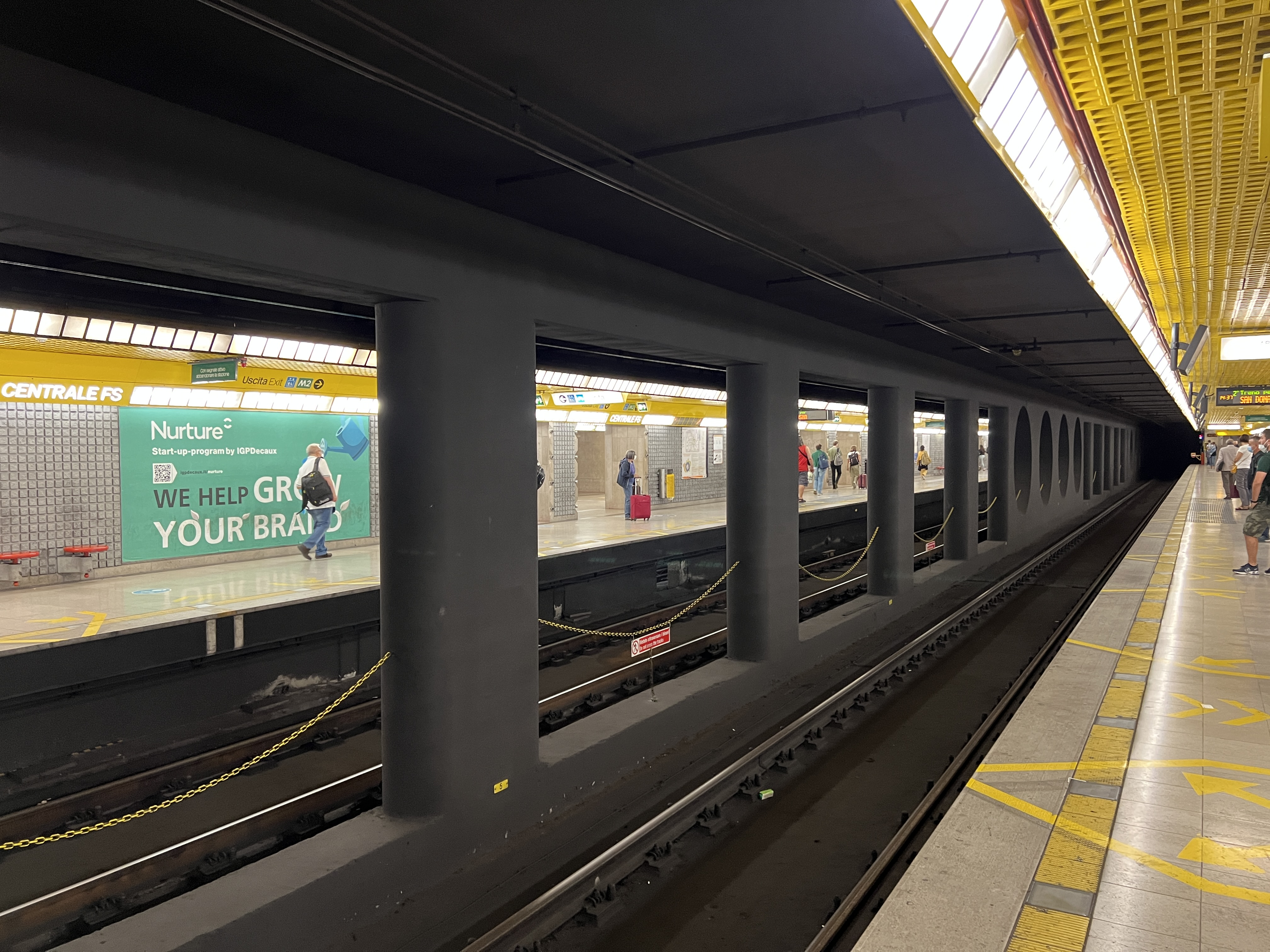

General information
- Location: Piazza Duca d'Aosta, Milan
- Coordinates: 45°29′05″N 9°12′11″E
- Owner: Azienda Trasporti Milanesi
- Platforms: 2 (line 2); 2 (line 3)
- Tracks: 2 (line 2); 2 (line 3)
- Connections: Milano Centrale railway station

Construction
- Structure type: Underground
- Platform levels: 2
- Accessible: y

Other information
- Fare zone: STIBM: Mi1

History
- Opened: Line 2: 27 April 1970; 56 years ago Line 3: 1 May 1990; 36 years ago

Services
Preceding station	Milan Metro	Following station
Gioia towards Assago or Abbiategrasso	Line 2	Caiazzo towards Cologno Nord or Gessate
Sondrio towards Comasina	Line 3	Repubblica towards San Donato
Location
- Location within Milan Location within Lombardy Location within Northern Italy Location within Italy

Centrale FS is a station on Lines 2 and 3 of the Milan Metro in Milan, Italy. The Line 2 station was opened on 27 April 1970 as a one-station extension from Caiazzo. On 21 July 1971, the line was extended to Garibaldi FS. The Line 3 station was opened on 1 May 1990 as part of the inaugural section of the line between Duomo and Centrale. Initially, Duomo was connected with Centrale by shuttle service, and on 16 December 1990, with the extension of the line to Porta Romana, full-scale service started. The station remained the terminus of Line 3 until 12 May 1991, when Sondrio was opened.

The station is located just under the Milano Centrale railway station. The station is underground with two tracks in a single tunnel both for Line 3 and Line 2, Line 2 running deeper than Line 3. The station also serves the Pirelli Tower.
