= Brena (surname) =

Brena or Breña is a surname. Notable people with the surname include:

- Guido Breña López (1931–2013), Peruvian Roman Catholic bishop
- Kelly Brena, Martiniquais football player
- Lepa Brena (born 1960), Yugoslav and Serbian singer and actress

== See also ==
- Brena (disambiguation)
- Brenta (surname)
- Brera (surname)
