= Brenta (surname) =

Brenta is a surname. Notable people with the surname include:

- Emilio Brenta, an Italian admiral
- Julie Brenta, a Belgian sound engineer and film editor

== See also ==
- Brenta (disambiguation)
- Brena (surname)
