= Gioia (Milan Metro) =

Milan metro station

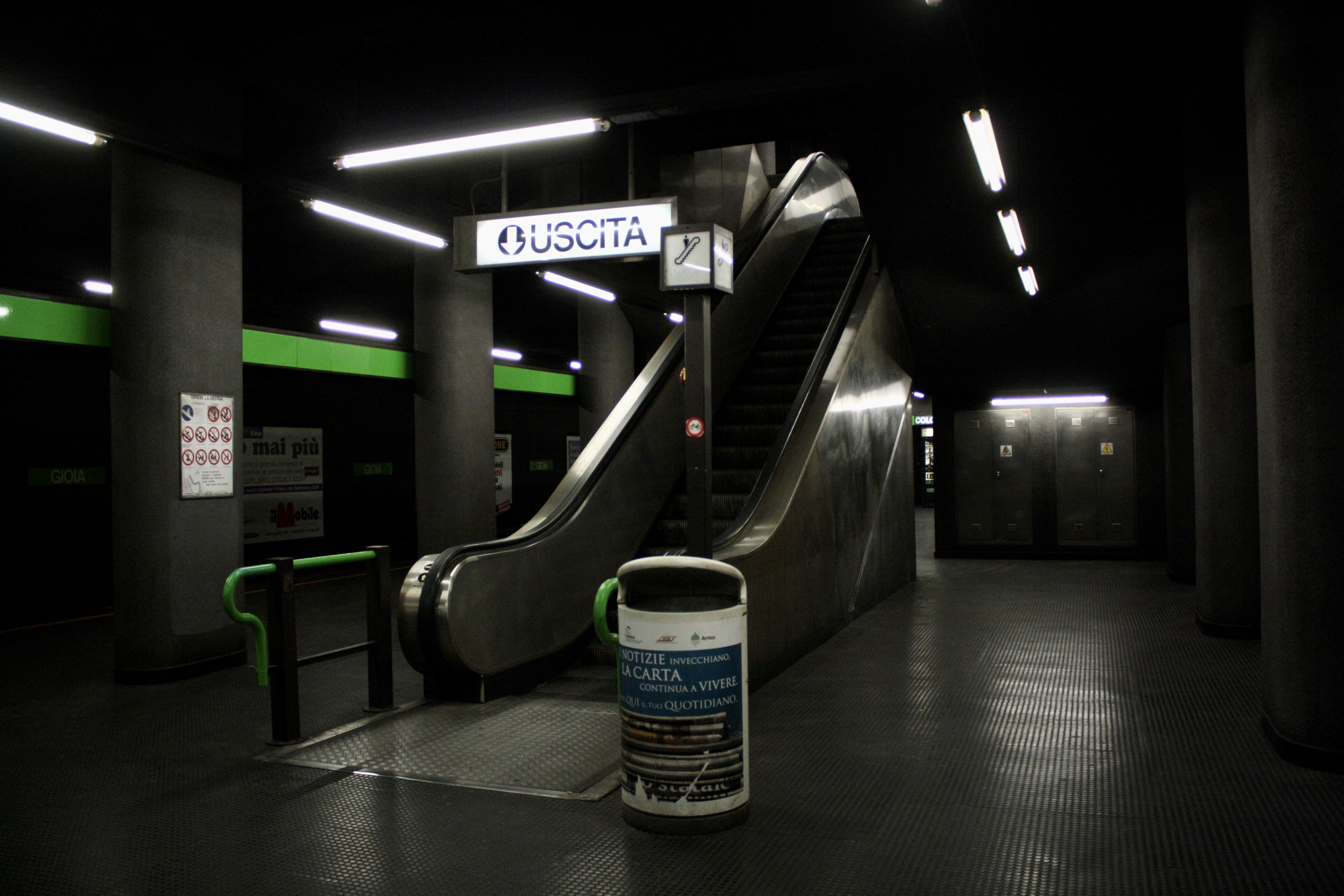

General information
- Location: Via Melchiorre Gioia, Milan
- Coordinates: 45°29′05″N 9°11′43″E
- Owner: Azienda Trasporti Milanesi
- Platforms: 1
- Tracks: 2

Construction
- Structure type: Underground
- Accessible: y

Other information
- Fare zone: STIBM: Mi1

History
- Opened: 12 July 1971; 55 years ago

Services
Preceding station	Milan Metro	Following station
Garibaldi FS towards Assago or Abbiategrasso	Line 2	Centrale towards Cologno Nord or Gessate
Location

Gioia is a station on Line 2 of the Milan Metro. The station was opened on 21 July 1971 as part of the extension from Centrale to Garibaldi FS.

The station is located between Via Melchiorre Gioia and Via Giovanni Battista Pirelli, within the territory of the municipality of Milan. It is also the focus of the Management Center of Milan.

This is an underground station, with two tracks in two separate tunnels.
