= Breña (disambiguation) =

Breña is a district, Lima, Peru. Breña or Brena may also refer to:

- Brena (surname)
- "Breña", a song by A Perfect Circle from Mer de Noms
- Breña Alta, a municipality in the province of Santa Cruz de Tenerife, in the Canary Islands
- Breña Baja, a municipality in the province of Santa Cruz de Tenerife, in the Canary Islands
- Las Breñas, a city in Chaco Province, Argentina
- House at Breñas Point, a house on a peninsula named Breñas, in Dorado, Puerto Rico
- Brena (footballer) (born 1996), Brazilian footballer
