= Brenda (disambiguation) =

Brenda, a feminine given name

Brenda may also refer to:

- Brenda, a children's author
- BRENDA, an enzyme database
- Brenda & the Tabulations, an American R&B group
- Rural Municipality of Brenda, municipality in Manitoba, Canada
- Kolbjørn Brenda, a Norwegian actor
- 1609 Brenda, a stony asteroid of the asteroid belt
- Brenda (album), a 1973 album by Brenda Lee

== See also ==
- Brenta (disambiguation)
