= Duomo (Milan Metro) =

Milan metro station

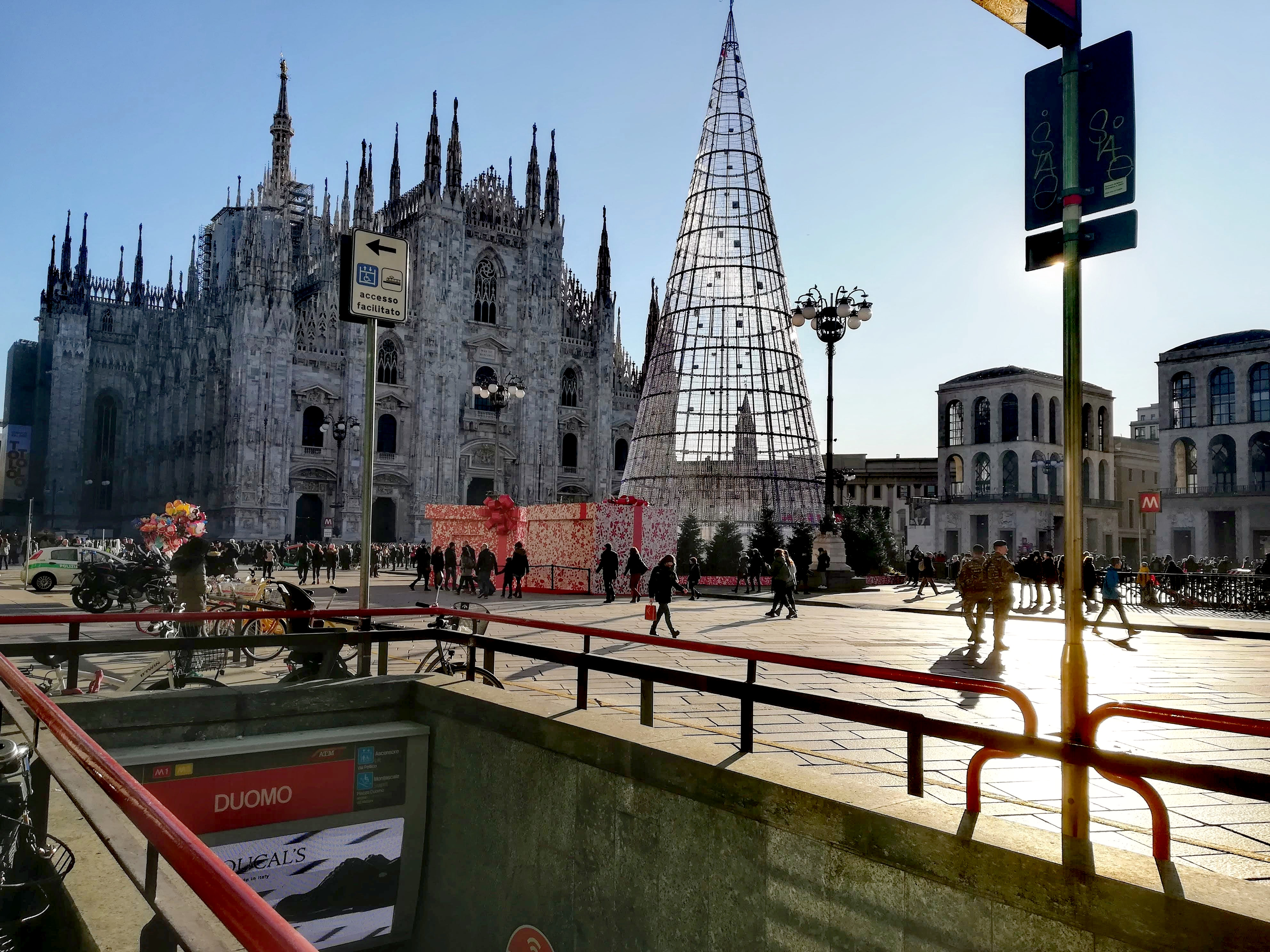

General information
- Location: Piazza del Duomo, Milan
- Coordinates: 45°27′53″N 9°11′25″E
- Owner: Azienda Trasporti Milanesi
- Platforms: 2 (line 1); 2 (line 3)
- Tracks: 2 (line 1); 2 (line 3)

Construction
- Structure type: Underground
- Platform levels: 3 (one for line 1 station and two for line 3)
- Accessible: y

Other information
- Fare zone: STIBM: Mi1

History
- Opened: Line 1: 1 November 1964; 61 years ago Line 3: 1 May 1990; 36 years ago

Services
Preceding station	Milan Metro	Following station
Cordusio towards Rho Fiera or Bisceglie	Line 1	San Babila towards Sesto 1º Maggio
Montenapoleone towards Comasina	Line 3	Missori towards San Donato
Location
- Location within Milan Location within Lombardy Location within Northern Italy Location within Italy

Duomo is an interchange station serving Lines 1 and 3 of the Milan Metro.

The station is underground and located at Piazza Duomo, the central area of Milan. The Line 1 station was opened on 1 November 1964 as part of the inaugural section of the Metro, between Sesto Marelli and Lotto. On 1 May 1990, it became an interchange with Line 3. Initially, Duomo was connected with Centrale by shuttle service, and on 16 December 1990, with the extension of the line from Duomo to Porta Romana, full-scale service started.

The Line 3 platform serving trains to San Donato has several problems with moisture as it is at a depth of about 25 meters. Line 1, being older, runs above Line 3. The Line 3 section is divided into two orthogonal tubes, the northern one being above the southern one.

Near the station are the Duomo, the Teatro alla Scala, the Royal Palace and the Galleria Vittorio Emanuele II.

A corridor of the station is in communication (but the passage is closed) with the archaeological excavations of the pre-Christian basilica located under the Duomo.

The mezzanine of the station is connected by tunnels that reach the exits of Piazza Cordusio ("Craft Gallery"), Palazzo Reale ("Galleria del Parvis"), Corso Vittorio Emanuele II and the Rinascente in Piazza Duomo.
