= Milan Metro Line 4 =

Metro line in Milan, Italy

M4

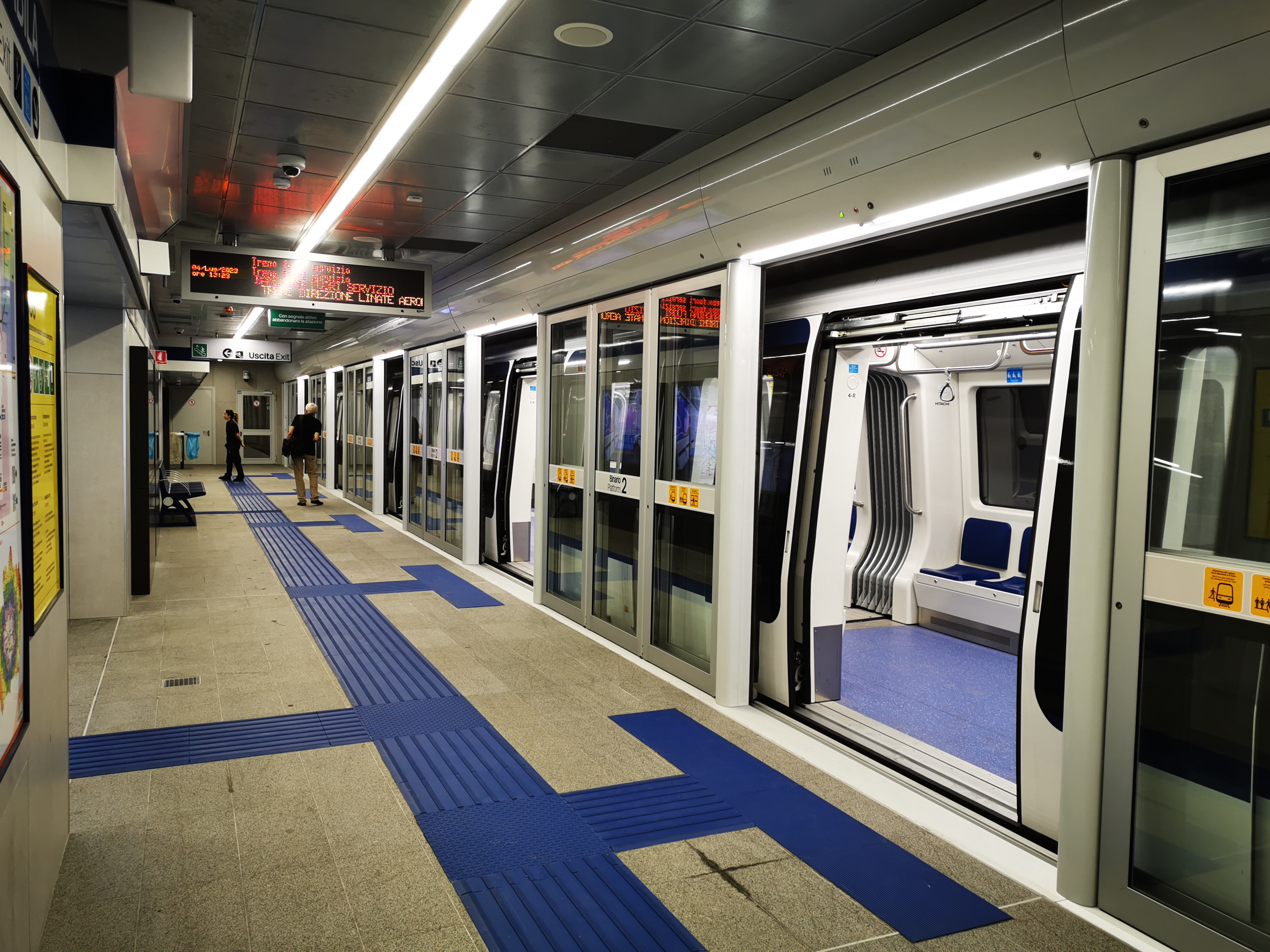
- San Babila station

Overview
- Status: Operational
- Locale: Milan, Italy
- Stations: 21
- Website: Official website

Service
- Type: Rapid transit
- System: Milan Metro
- Operator(s): Azienda Trasporti Milanesi
- Rolling stock: Hitachi Rail Italy Driverless Metro
- Daily ridership: 40,000 (July 2023-February 2024)

History
- Opened: 26 November 2022; 3 years ago
- Last extension: 12 October 2024

Technical
- Line length: 15.2 km (9.4 mi)
- Track gauge: 1,435 mm (4 ft 8 1/2 in) standard gauge
- Electrification: Third rail, 750 V DC
Route map

Line 4 is an underground rapid transit line in Milan, Italy, part of the Milan Metro. The line is 15.2 km (9.4 mi) long with 21 stations.

The line was opened in stages between 2022 and 2024. It features automatic driverless trains and is designed for a capacity of 24–28,000 passengers per hour in each direction. The expected annual ridership is 87 million.

== Construction ==
The first three stations of the line (Linate-Repetti-Forlanini) was originally planned to be completed in 2015, as part of the works for the Milan Expo. However, delays in planning, financing and construction works forced to postpone the opening, with the first section opening on 26 November 2022 and the rest of the line expected to open by 2023. The line is 15 km (9.3 mi) long with 21 stations, with its final 13 stops opening on 12 October 2024.

The consortium ATM-Webuild is responsible for the construction works.

Of the total estimated cost of about €1.7 billion, the Government of Italy will cover €786 million via a grant, the municipal government of Milan will cover €400 million, and €512 million will be funded by private investors.

== Route ==
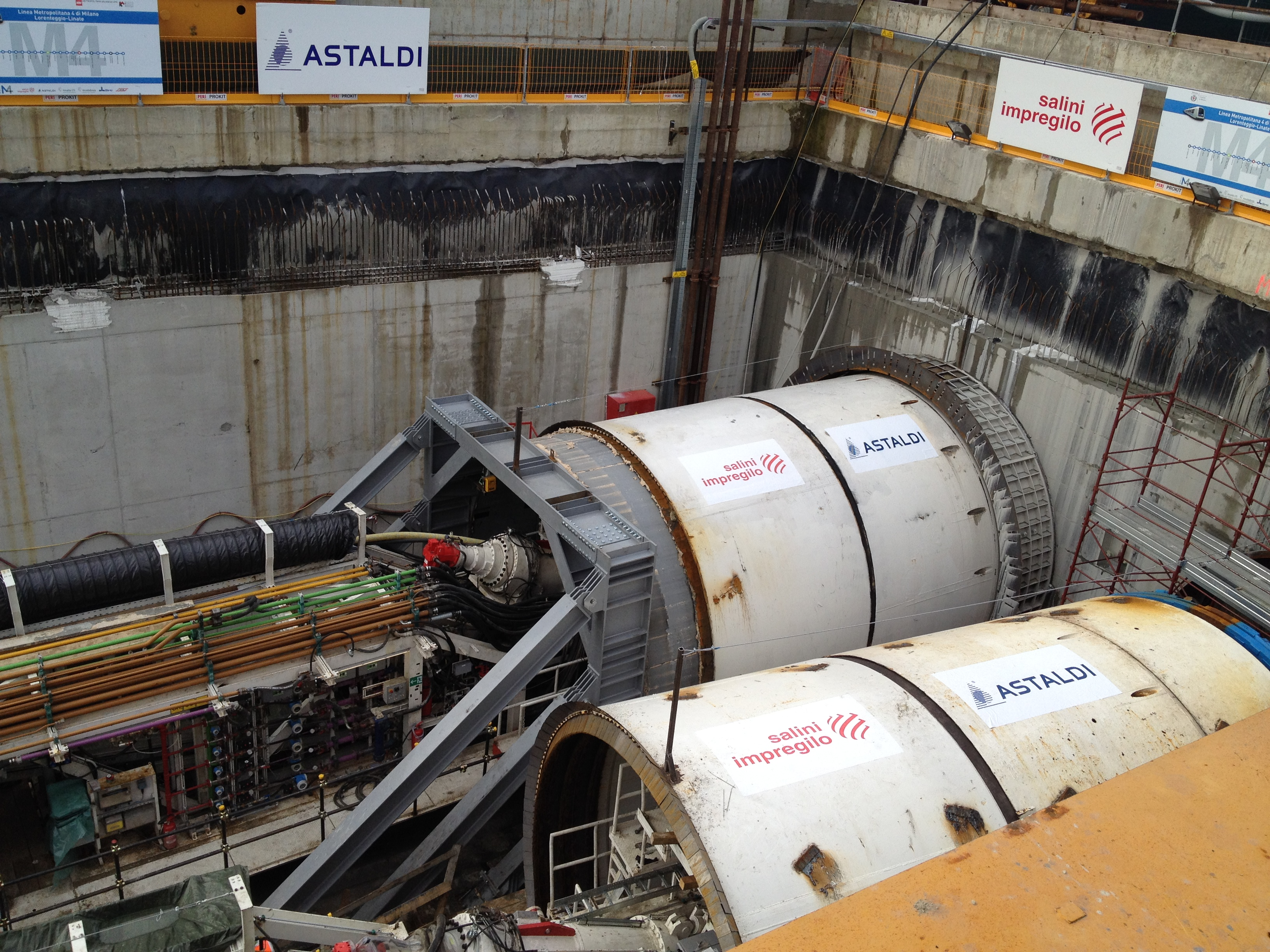
Tunnel boring machines used in the project, 2014

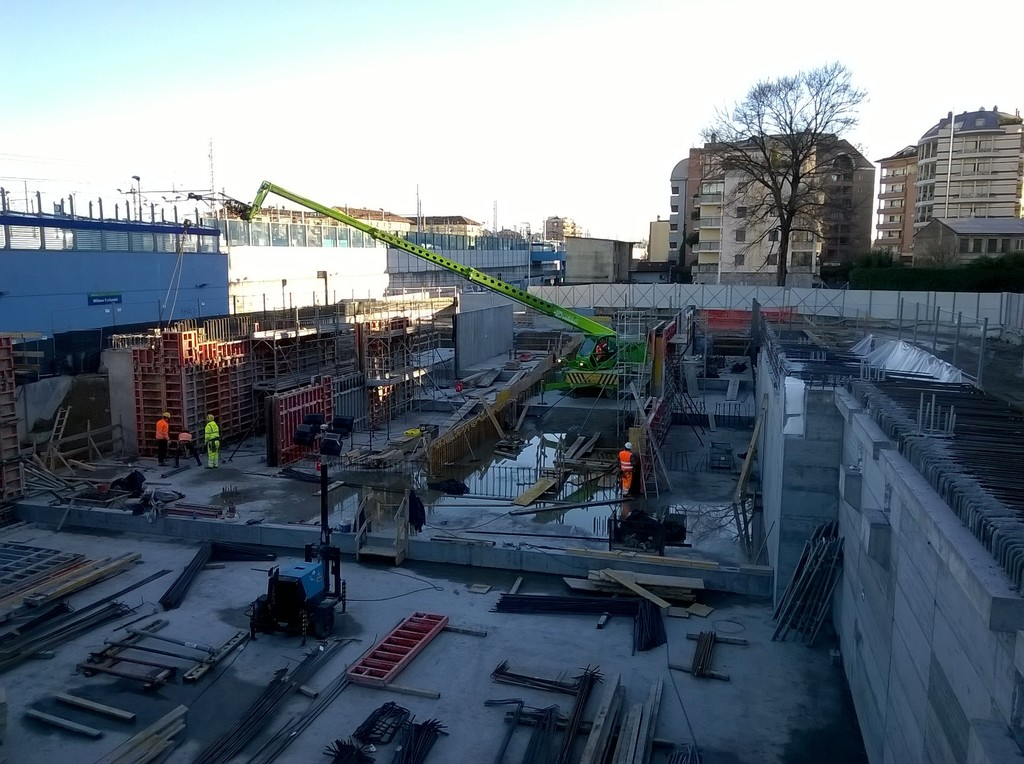
Forlanini FS station under construction in 2016

The line connects the south-western neighborhood of Lorenteggio with Linate Airport on the east, passing through the city center. All stations are underground.

Station Name	Transfer	Opening
San Cristoforo FS	Line S9 (Milan suburban railway service) Line S19 (Milan suburban railway service)	12 October 2024
Segneri		12 October 2024
Gelsomini		12 October 2024
Frattini		12 October 2024
Tolstoj		12 October 2024
Bolivar		12 October 2024
California		12 October 2024
Coni Zugna		12 October 2024
Sant'Ambrogio	Milan Metro Line 2	12 October 2024
De Amicis		12 October 2024
Vetra		12 October 2024
Santa Sofia		12 October 2024
Sforza-Policlinico	(Note: Out-of-system interchange at Missori)	12 October 2024
San Babila	Milan Metro Line 1	4 July 2023
Tricolore		4 July 2023
Dateo	Line S1 (Milan suburban railway service) Line S2 (Milan suburban railway service) Line S5 (Milan suburban railway service) Line S6 (Milan suburban railway service) Line S12 (Milan suburban railway service) Line S13 (Milan suburban railway service)	26 November 2022
Susa		26 November 2022
Argonne		26 November 2022
Stazione Forlanini	Line S5 (Milan suburban railway service) Line S6 (Milan suburban railway service) Line S9 (Milan suburban railway service)	26 November 2022
Repetti		26 November 2022
Linate Aeroporto		26 November 2022

== Rolling stock ==
The line uses Hitachi Rail Italy Driverless Metro automatic driverless trains. The line will be operated by 37 four-car EMUs manufactured by Hitachi Rail Italy at Reggio Calabria. Because of production problems caused by the COVID-19 pandemic, some were sent to Hitachi Newton Aycliffe in England for final fitting out.

== See also ==
- Transport in Milan
- Milan S Lines
