= San Babila (Milan Metro) =

Metro station in Milan, Italy

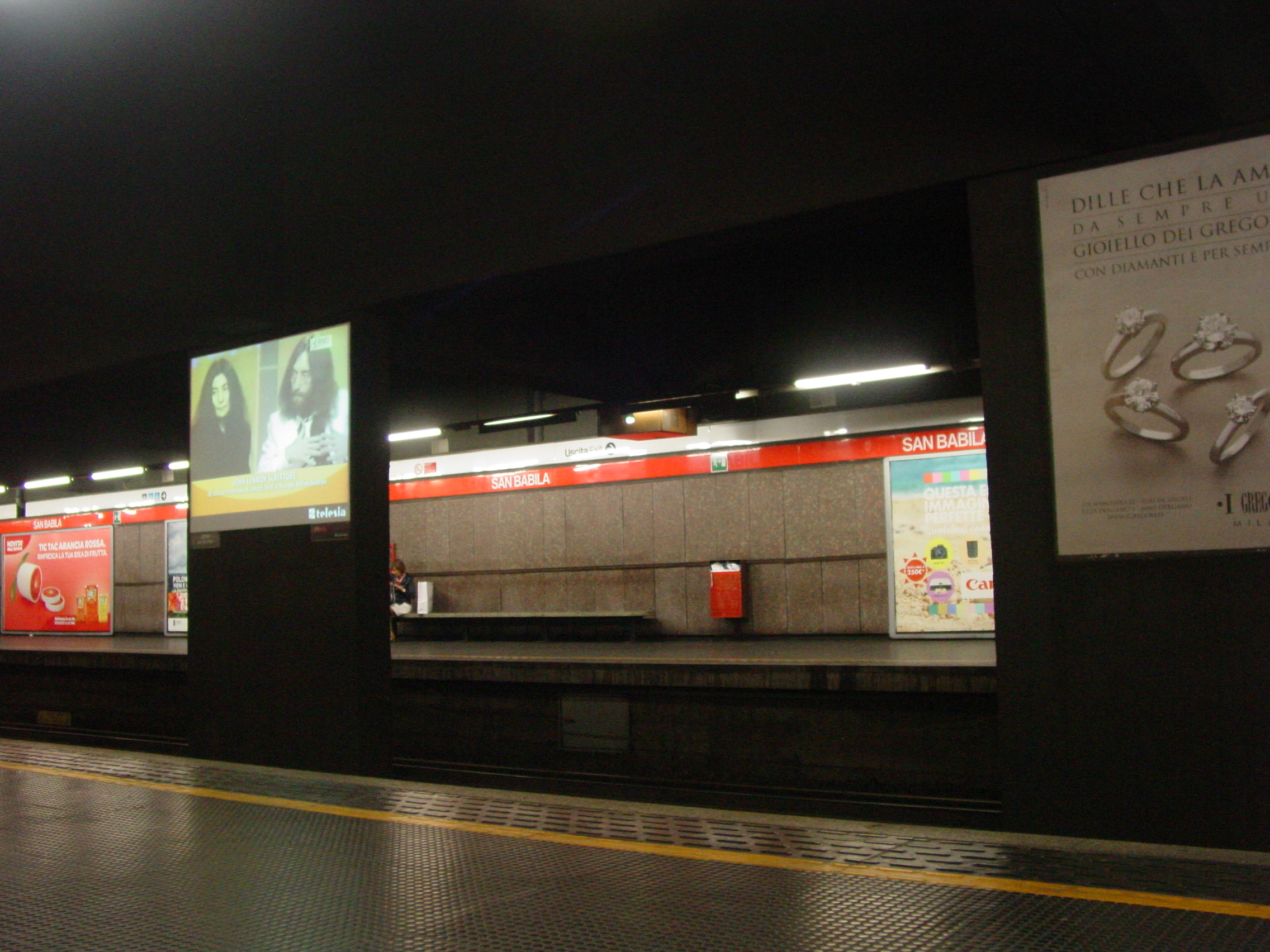

General information
- Location: Piazza San Babila, Milan
- Coordinates: 45°28′00″N 9°11′51″E
- Owner: Azienda Trasporti Milanesi
- Platforms: 4
- Tracks: 4

Construction
- Structure type: Underground
- Accessible: y

Other information
- Fare zone: STIBM: Mi1

History
- Opened: 1 November 1964; 61 years ago

Services
Preceding station	Milan Metro	Following station
Duomo towards Rho Fiera or Bisceglie	Line 1	Palestro towards Sesto 1º Maggio
Sforza-Policlinico towards San Cristoforo FS	Line 4	Tricolore towards Linate Aeroporto
Location
- Location within Milan Location within Lombardy Location within Northern Italy Location within Italy

San Babila is an underground station on Line 1 and Line 4 of the Milan Metro. It opened on 1 November 1964 as part of the inaugural section of the Metro, between Sesto Marelli and Lotto.

The station is located at Piazza San Babila, in the city centre of Milan.
