= Porta Romana (Milan Metro) =

Milan metro station

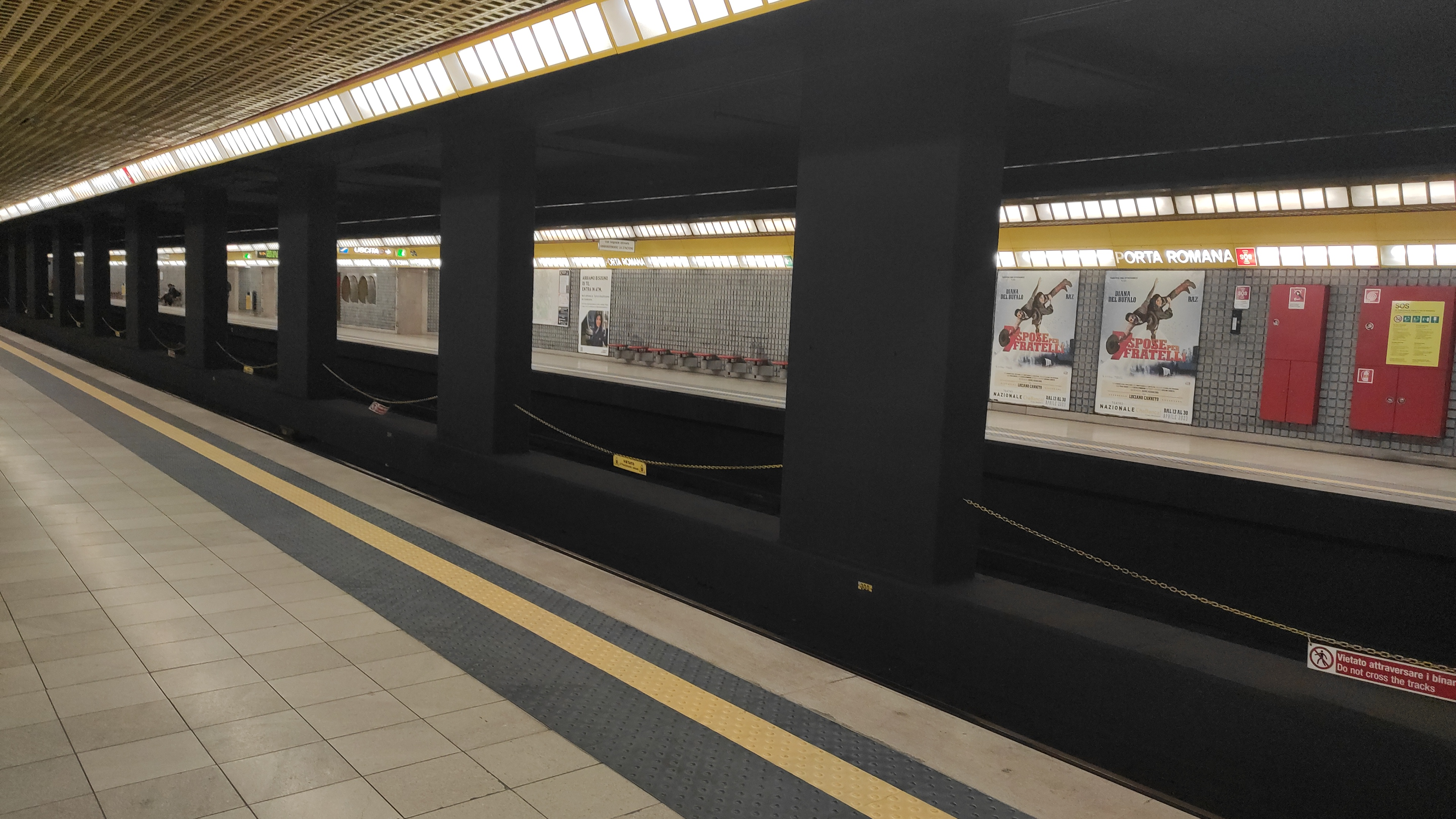

General information
- Location: Corso Lodi near Porta Romana, Milan
- Coordinates: 45°27′06″N 9°12′11″E
- Owner: Azienda Trasporti Milanesi
- Platforms: 2
- Tracks: 2

Construction
- Structure type: Underground
- Accessible: yes

Other information
- Fare zone: STIBM: Mi1

History
- Opened: 16 December 1990; 35 years ago

Services
Preceding station	Milan Metro	Following station
Crocetta towards Comasina	Line 3	Lodi T.I.B.B. towards San Donato
Location
- Location within Milan Location within Lombardy Location within Northern Italy Location within Italy

Porta Romana is a station on Line 3 of the Milan Metro which opened on 16 December 1990 as part of the extension of the line from Duomo to Porta Romana. The line terminated here until 12 May 1991, when it was extended south to San Donato.

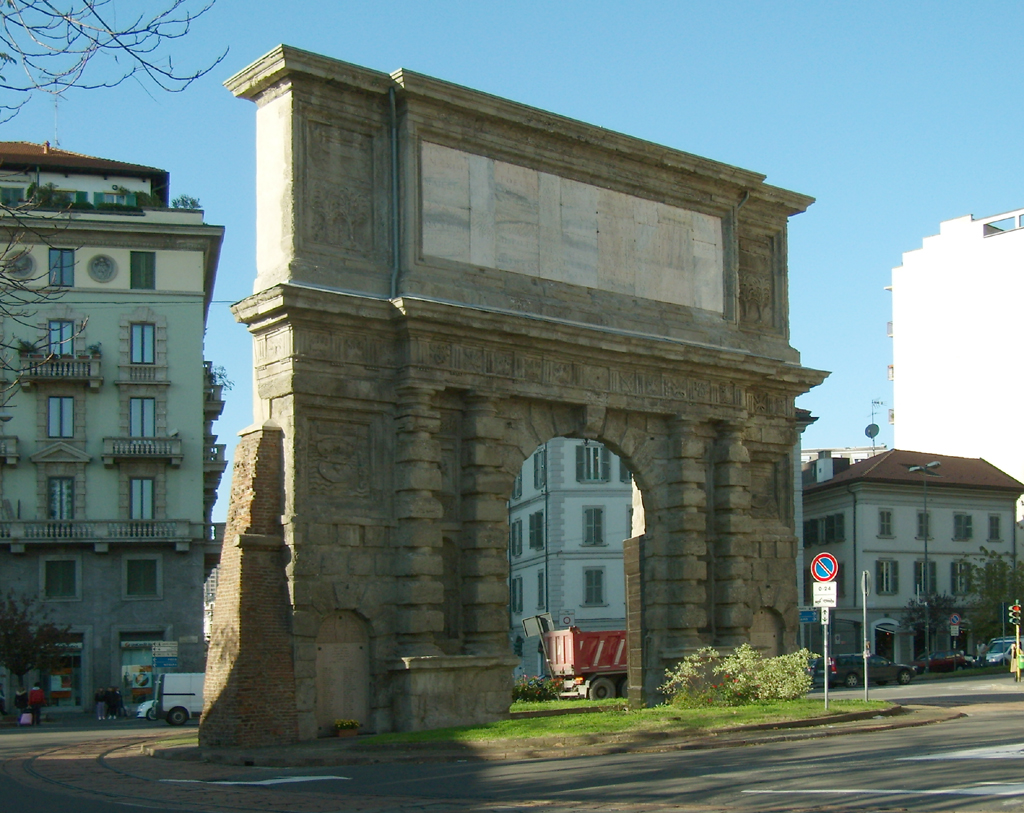
Roman Gate, Porta Romana

The station is located at the extreme south of Corso di Porta Romana, in Piazza Medaglie d'Oro. According to the first projects, the station was to be called Medaglie d'Oro after the homonymous square.

The station, like all others on Line 3, is underground, and it is the first one in the southern track to be built in a single tunnel, marking the exit from the city center.

The station is near Bocconi University.
