= San Donato (Milan Metro) =

Milan metro station

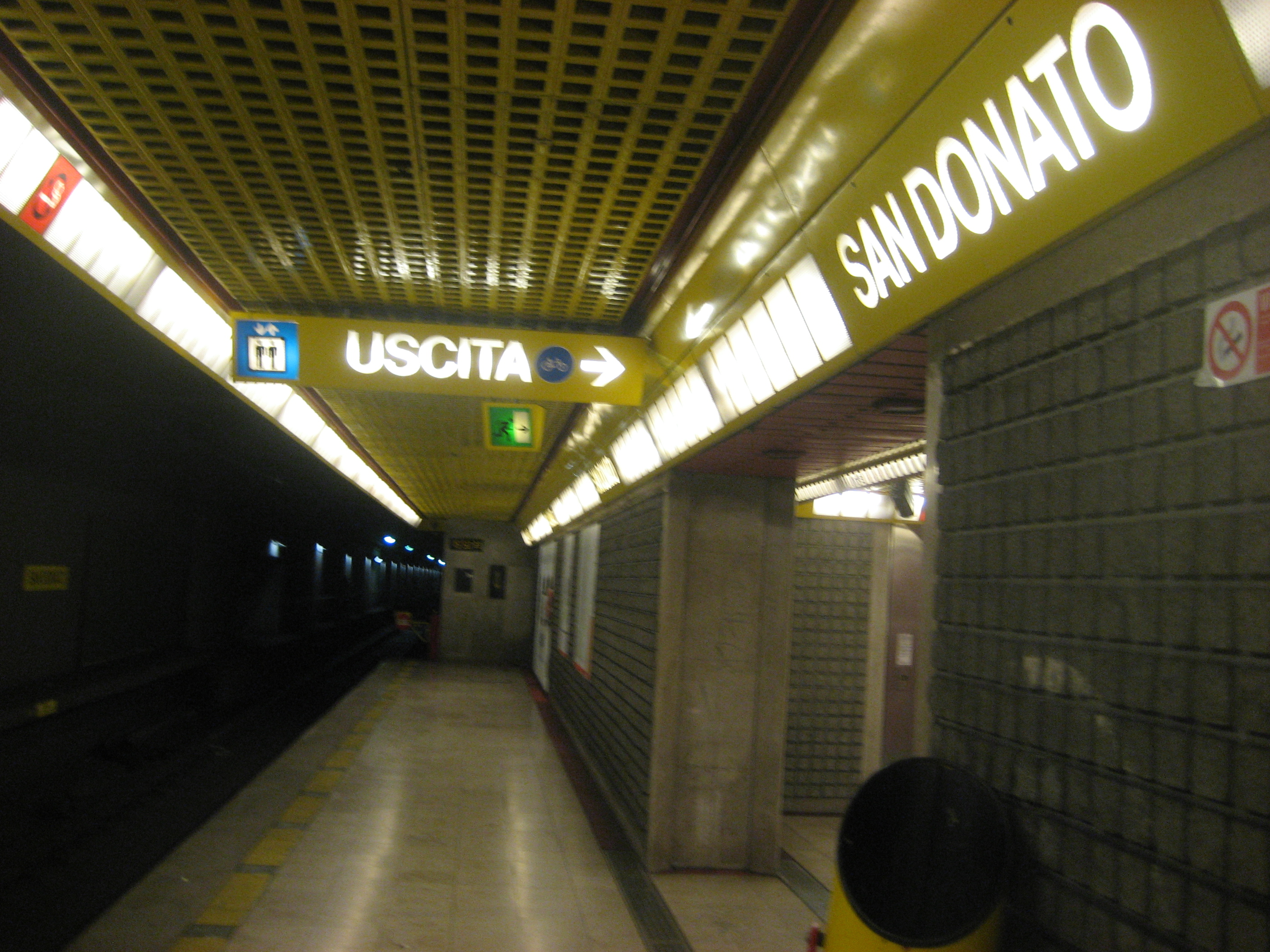

General information
- Location: Via Giuseppe Impastato, Milan
- Coordinates: 45°25′45″N 9°15′23″E
- Owner: Azienda Trasporti Milanesi
- Platforms: 2
- Tracks: 3

Construction
- Structure type: Underground
- Accessible: yes

Other information
- Fare zone: STIBM: Mi1 and Mi3

History
- Opened: 12 May 1991; 35 years ago

Services
Preceding station	Milan Metro	Following station
Rogoredo towards Comasina	Line 3	Terminus
Location
- Location within Milan Location within Lombardy Location within Northern Italy Location within Italy

San Donato is a station on Line 3 of the Milan Metro in Milan, Italy. The station was opened on 12 May 1991 as part of the extension of the line from Porta Romana. It is the southern terminus of the line.

The station is located between Via Marignano and Via Giuseppe Impastato, in the municipality of Milan, near the city border with San Donato Milanese.

The station is underground with three tracks in two different tunnels.

An airplane crash happened close to this station in 2021. All of its eight passengers died in the incident.
