= Comasina (Milan Metro) =

Milan metro station

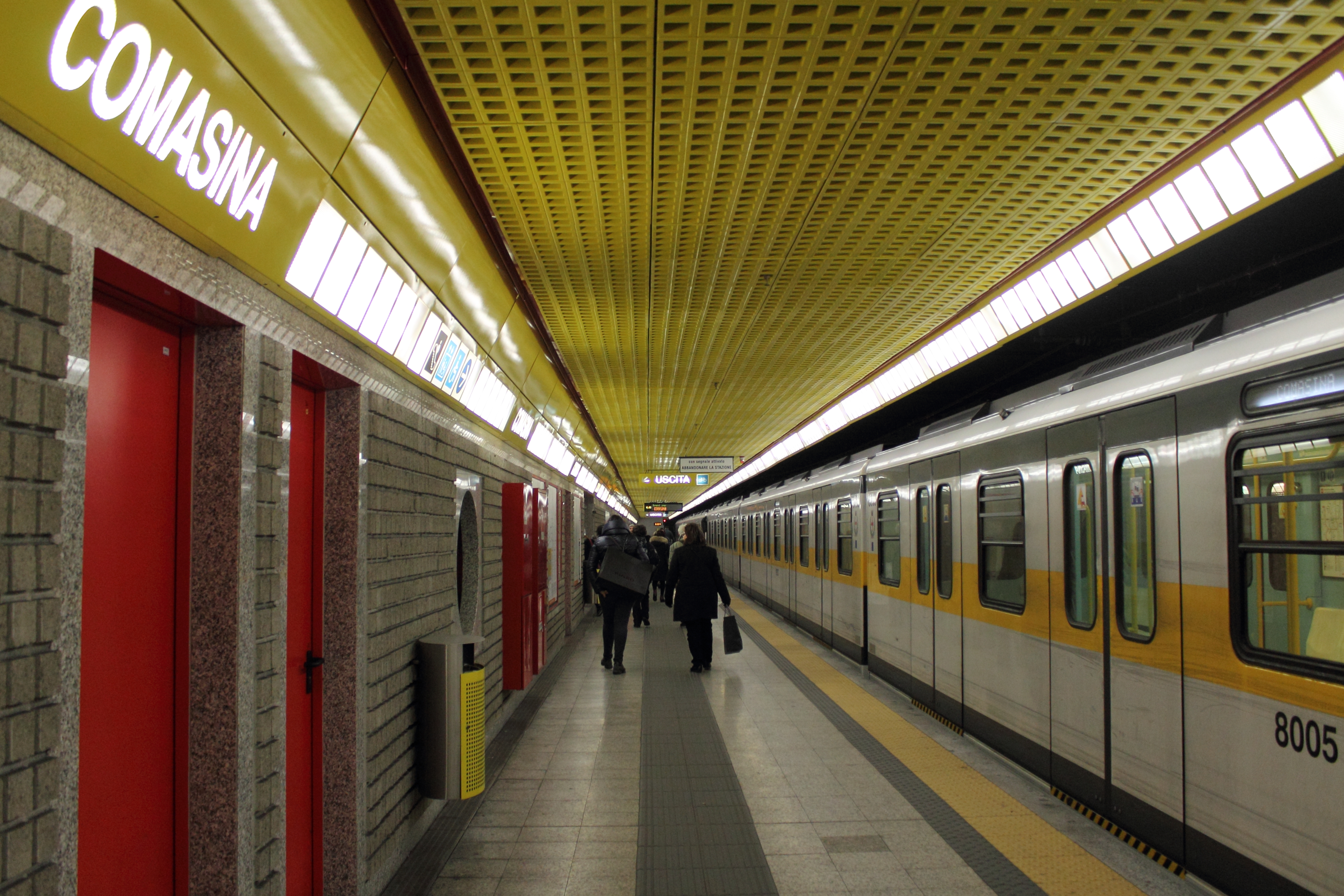

General information
- Location: Via Comasina, Comasina, Milan
- Coordinates: 45°31′43″N 9°09′49″E
- Owner: Azienda Trasporti Milanesi
- Platforms: 2
- Tracks: 2

Construction
- Structure type: Underground
- Accessible: yes

Other information
- Fare zone: STIBM: Mi1

History
- Opened: 26 March 2011; 15 years ago

Services
Preceding station	Milan Metro	Following station
Terminus	Line 3	Affori FN towards San Donato
Location
- Location within Milan Location within Lombardy Location within Northern Italy Location within Italy

Comasina is a station on Line 3 of the Milan Metro which opened on March 26, 2011, twenty-one years after the opening of the original trunk of the line. Since its opening, it is the northern terminus of the line and one of the four stations on Line 3 opened in 2011, part of the section from Dergano to Comasina.

This station is located in the Comasina district, and it allows interchange with several lines serving the northern part of the Province of Milan.

The station is underground and built on a single tunnel with two tracks.
