= Cimiano (Milan Metro) =

Milan metro station

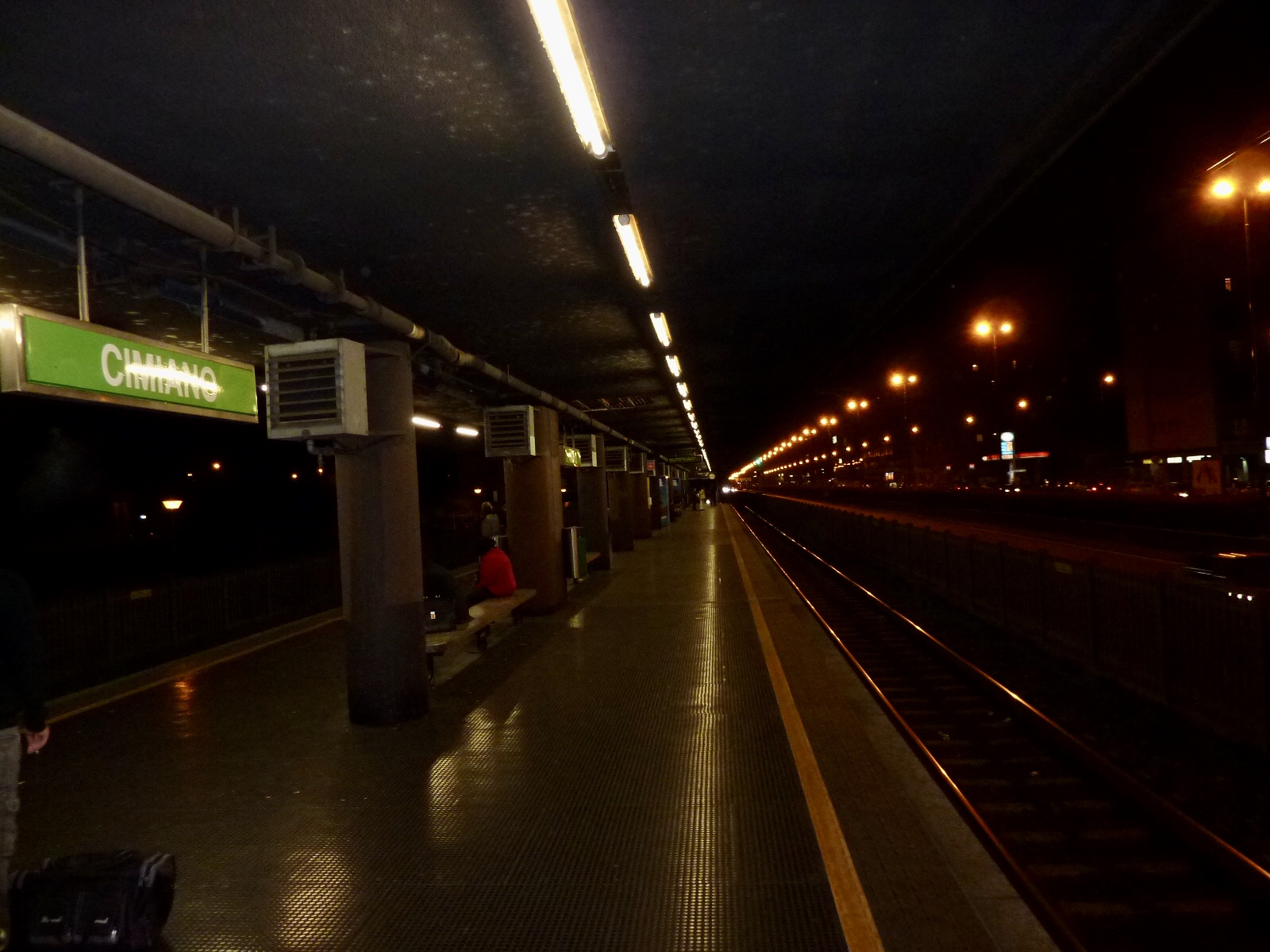

General information
- Location: Cimiano, Milan; Italy
- Coordinates: 45°29′58.6″N 9°14′27″E
- Owner: Azienda Trasporti Milanesi
- Platforms: 1 Island platform
- Tracks: 2

Construction
- Structure type: Surface
- Accessible: y

Other information
- Fare zone: STIBM: Mi1

History
- Opened: 26 May 1969; 57 years ago as tramway stop 27 September 1969; 56 years ago as metro station

Services
Preceding station	Milan Metro	Following station
Udine towards Assago or Abbiategrasso	Line 2	Crescenzago towards Cologno Nord or Gessate
Location

Cimiano is a station on Line 2 of the Milan Metro. The station is located near the junction between Via Palmanova, Viale Don Luigi Orione, Via Don Giovanni Calabria and Via Pusiano, in the district of Cimiano. The station was opened on 27 September 1969 as part of the inaugural section of Line 2, between Cascina Gobba and Caiazzo.

It is a surface station with a single island platform and has no access for people with physical disabilities.
