= Udine (Milan Metro) =

Milan metro station

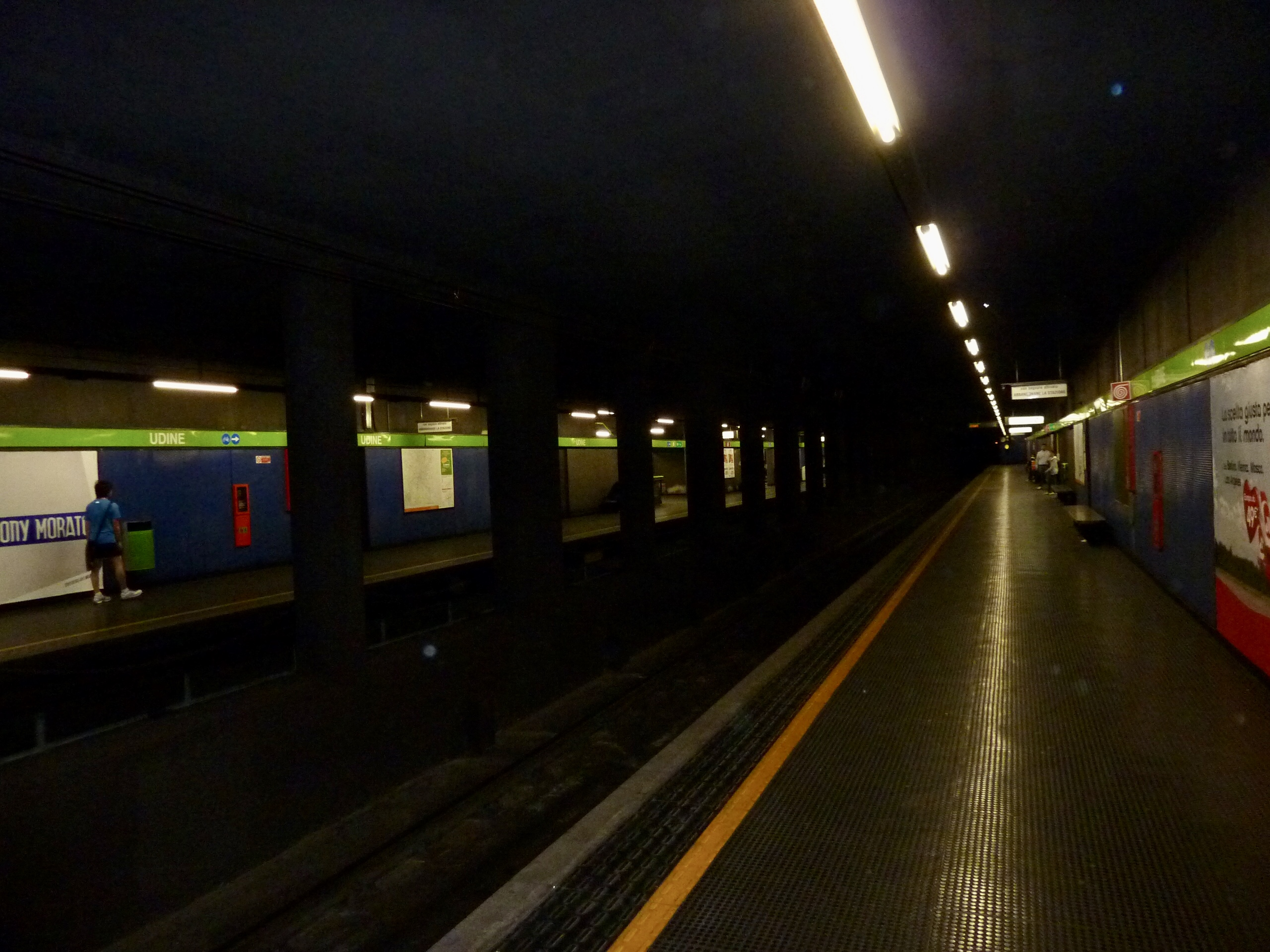

General information
- Location: Piazzale Udine, Milan; Italy
- Coordinates: 45°29′29″N 9°14′13″E
- Owner: Azienda Trasporti Milanesi
- Platforms: 2
- Tracks: 2

Construction
- Structure type: Underground
- Accessible: Yes

Other information
- Fare zone: STIBM: Mi1

History
- Opened: 27 September 1969; 56 years ago

Services
Preceding station	Milan Metro	Following station
Lambrate towards Assago or Abbiategrasso	Line 2	Cimiano towards Cologno Nord or Gessate
Location

Udine is a station on Line 2 of the Milan Metro. It is located at Piazzale Udine, near Parco Lambro, a large urban park, and Quartiere Feltre, a major residential district of Milan. The station was opened on 27 September 1969 as part of the inaugural section of Line 2, between Cascina Gobba and Caiazzo.
