= Lambrate (Milan Metro) =

Metro station in Milan, Italy

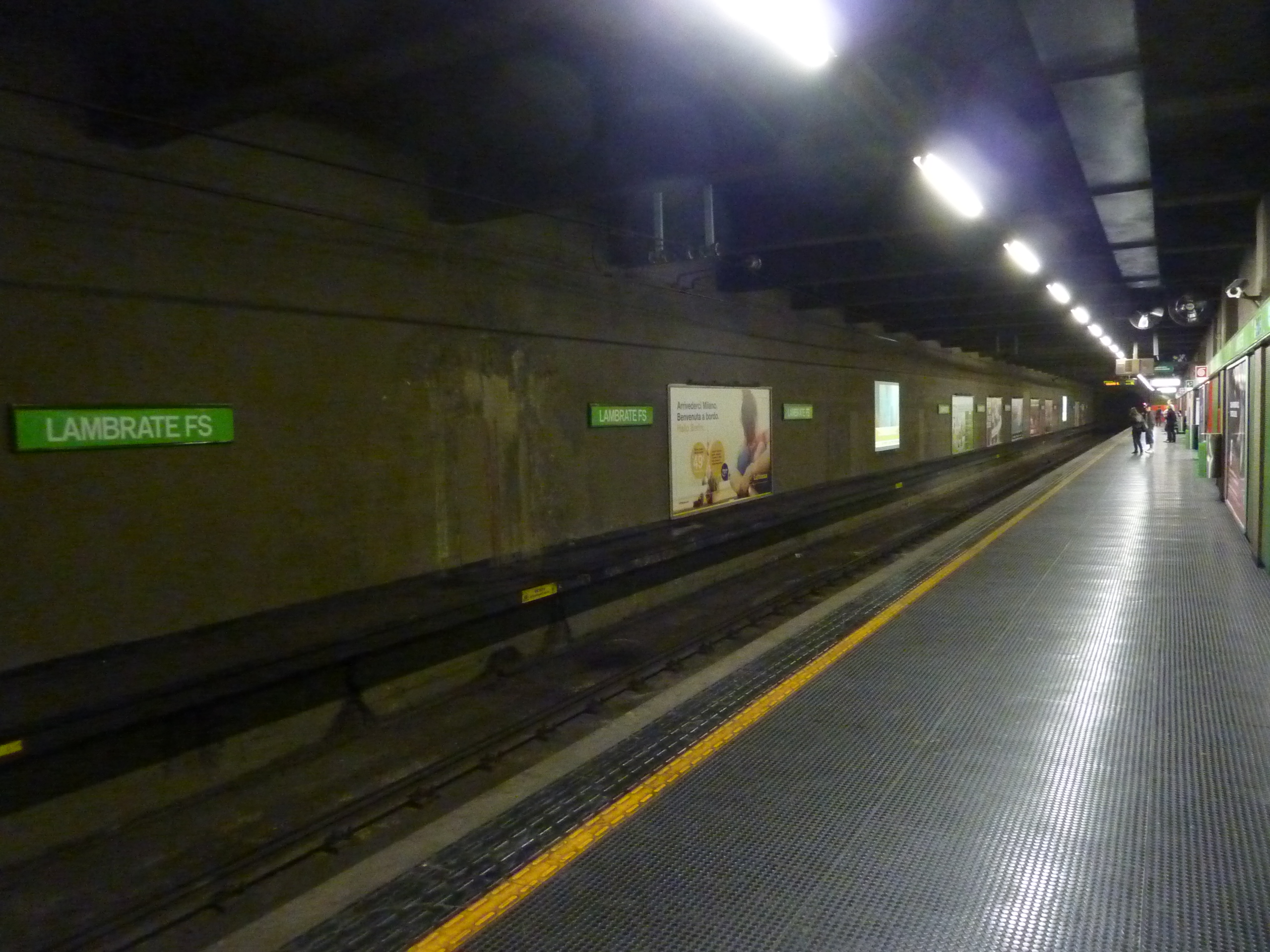

General information
- Location: Piazza Enrico Bottini, Milan; Italy
- Coordinates: 45°29′04″N 9°14′09″E
- Owner: Azienda Trasporti Milanesi
- Platforms: 1
- Tracks: 2
- Connections: Milano Lambrate railway station

Construction
- Structure type: Underground
- Accessible: Yes

Other information
- Fare zone: STIBM: Mi1

History
- Opened: 27 September 1969; 56 years ago

Services
Preceding station	Milan Metro	Following station
Piola towards Assago or Abbiategrasso	Line 2	Udine towards Cologno Nord or Gessate
Location

Lambrate is a station on Line 2 of the Milan Metro in the Lambrate district of Milan. It was opened on 27 September 1969 as part of the inaugural section of Line 2, between Cascina Gobba and Caiazzo.

The station is located at the Piazza Enrico Bottini, in front of Milano Lambrate railway station, and has been connected to it by a tunnel since December 2010.
