= Piola (Milan Metro) =

Milan metro station

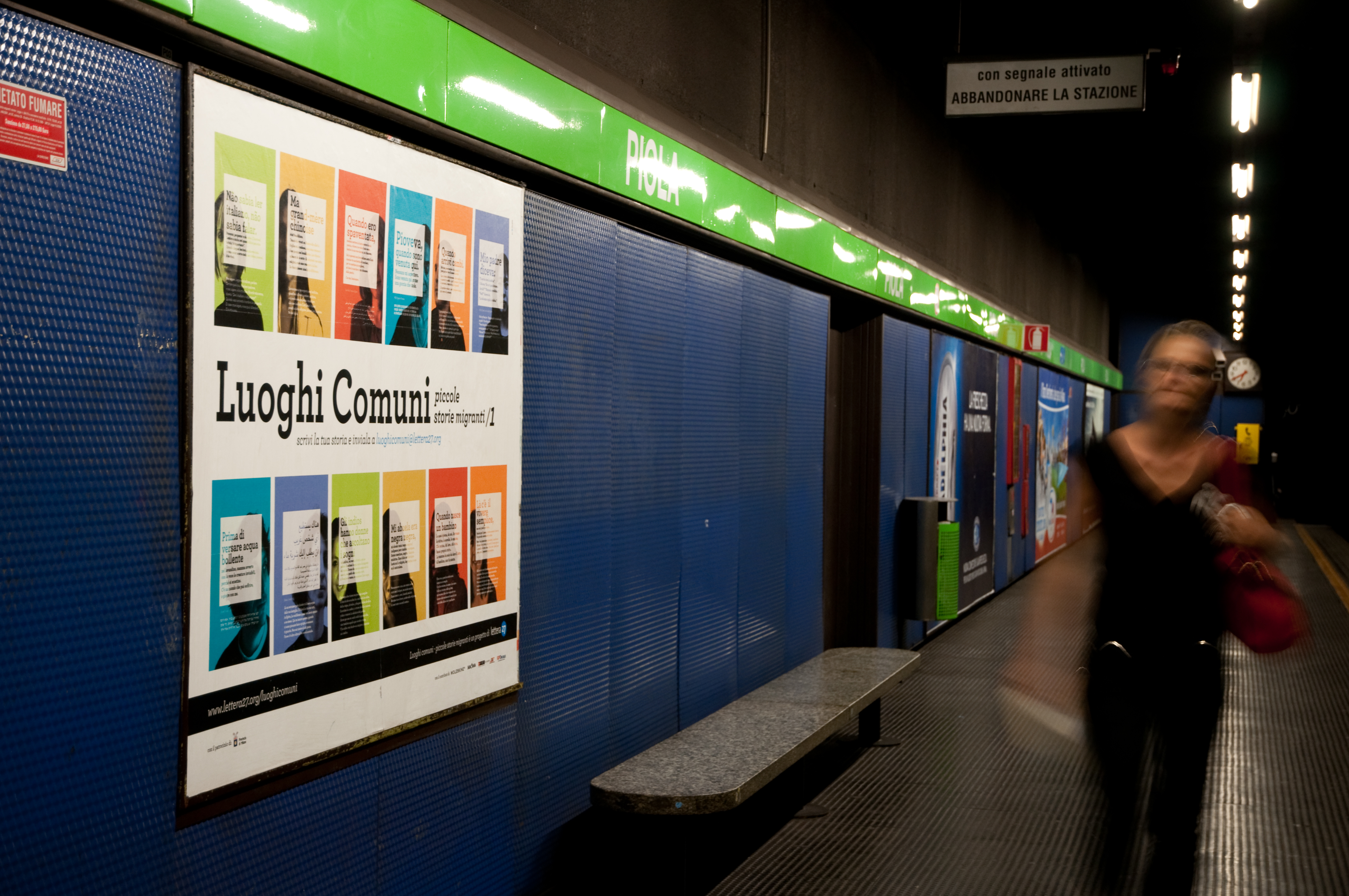

General information
- Location: Piazzale Piola, Milan; Italy
- Coordinates: 45°28′51″N 9°13′31″E
- Owner: Azienda Trasporti Milanesi
- Platforms: 1
- Tracks: 2

Construction
- Structure type: Underground
- Accessible: Yes

Other information
- Fare zone: STIBM: Mi1

History
- Opened: 27 September 1969; 56 years ago

Services
Preceding station	Milan Metro	Following station
Loreto towards Assago or Abbiategrasso	Line 2	Lambrate towards Cologno Nord or Gessate
Location

Piola is a station of the Milan Metro, on line M2. The station grants direct access to the Politecnico di Milano (POLIMI).

== History ==
Piola station was activated on September 27, 1969, as part of the first section of line 2, between Cascina Gobba and Caiazzo.

== Structures and facilities ==
The underground station is named after the nearby Piazzale Gabrio Piola, though it does not have a direct access to the square. There are three entrances to the station: Via Pacini, Via Bazzini, and Via d'Ovidio near Politecnico di Milano Architecture Building.

Piola station primarily serves the Politecnico di Milano, Città Studi area near the University of Milan and the Istituto dei Tumori.

== Interchanges ==
Several urban bus lines stop near the station:

- Trolley stop (V.le Gran Sasso P.le Piola M2, lines 90 e 91]])
- Trolley stop (V.le Romagna P.le Piola M2, lines 90 e 91]])
- Bus stop

== Services ==
The station has:

- Accessibility for Disability
- Escalators
- Ticket machine
- Stazione video surveillance

== Bibliography ==
- Giorgio Meregalli, Gli impianti ferroviari della linea 2 della Metropolitana di Milano, in "Ingegneria Ferroviaria", May 1971, pp. 469–492.
