= Signalling of the Milan Metro =

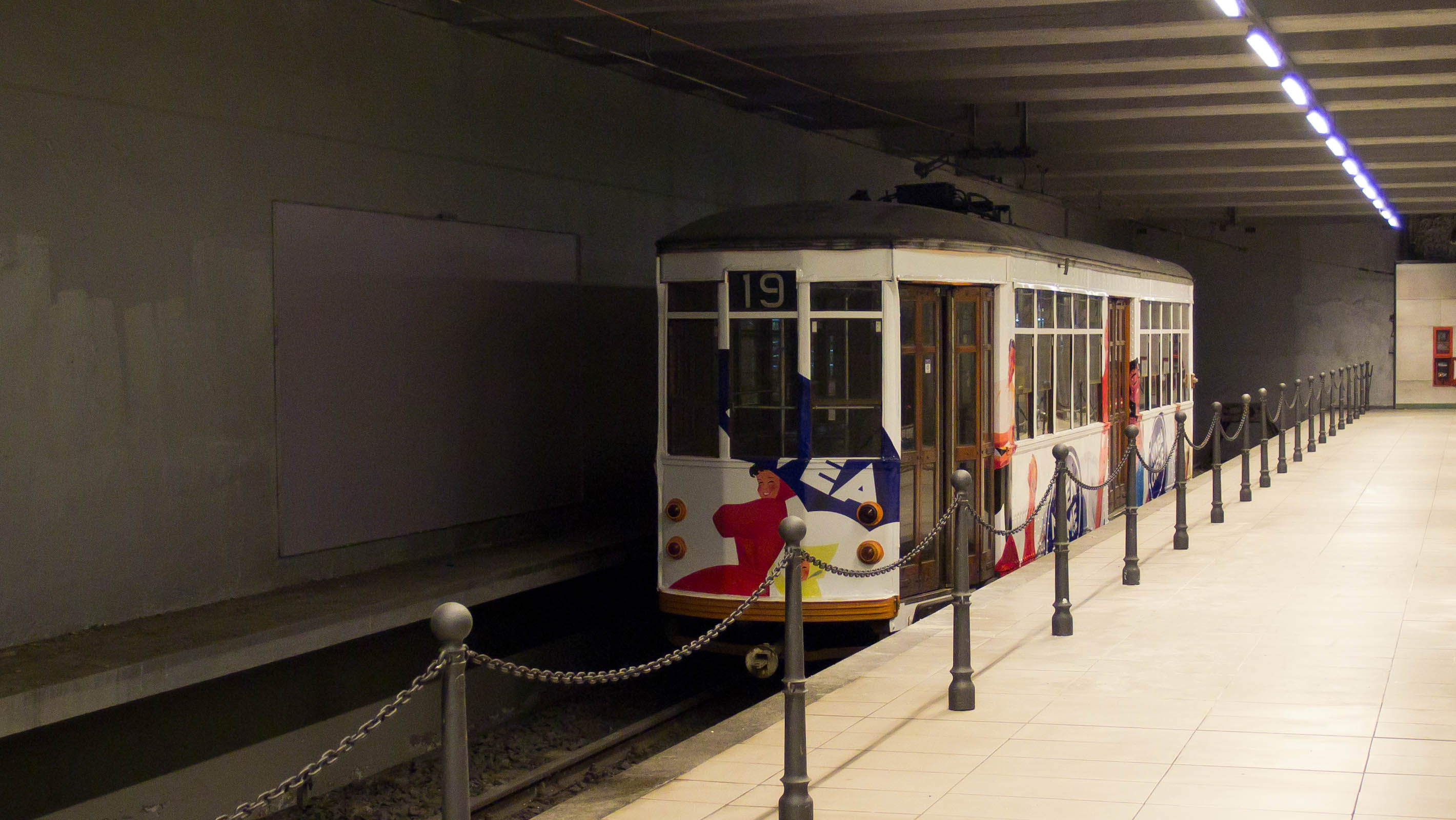
Garibaldi station from Milan's Metro System with an ATM class 1500 tram

The Milan Metro subway system is managed by a single ATM control centre, built in 2013 by Alstom.

== Lines 1 and 2 ==
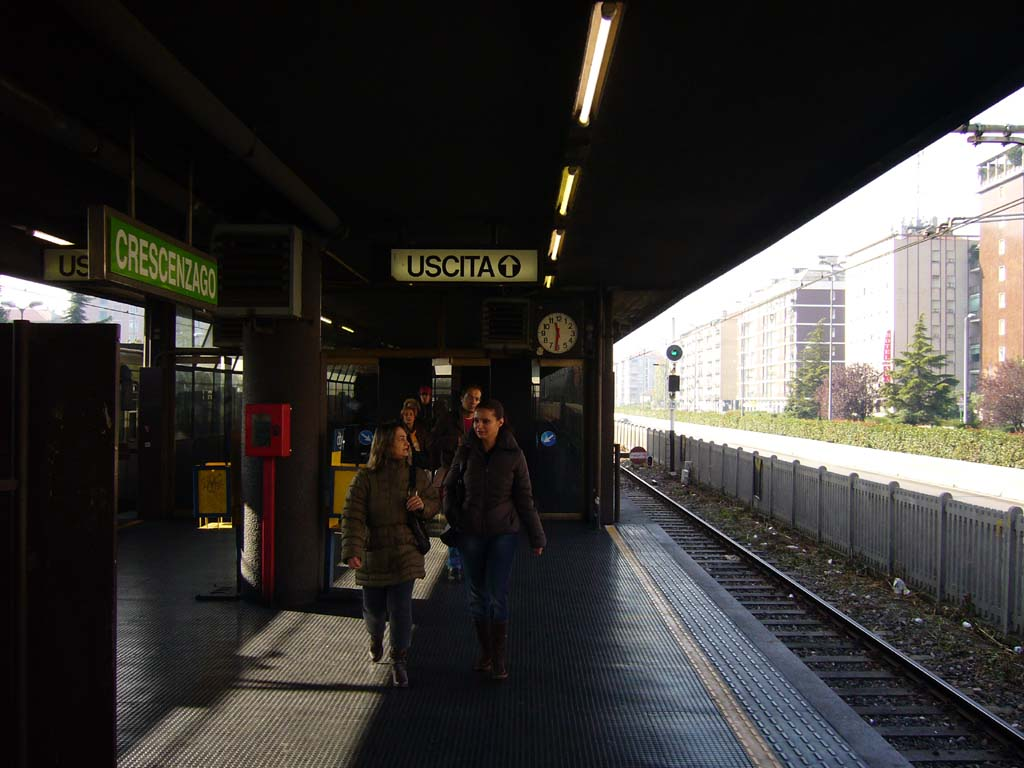
An FS like signal in Crescenzago station

Line 2 uses a speed signaling system. Trains are directed using light signals with five aspects:

- Imperative red: The train must stop.
- Permissive red: The train can go on with a maximum speed of 15 km/h (9 mph) and must stop in case of danger. Physically, it's represented by a fixed or flashing "P" under the semaphore.
- Red-yellow: The train can reach 25 km/h (15 mph).
- Yellow: The train can reach 45 km/h (28 mph).
- Green: The train can reach the line's speed limit: 85 km/h (53 mph) for the red line and 70 km/h (43 mph) for the green line.

Before 2011, Line 1 used this same system, but now uses a new signaling apparatus. The signaling apparatus permits a 90-second frequency on the line, allowing for additional capacity, especially at rush hour, similar to the one used on the M3 line. The speed of the train is decided by an ATC system and a two-color semaphore system.

The two-color semaphore system has three possible states:

- Red: Imperative red.
- Red and white: Conditional green.
- White: Green.

== Line 3 ==
Line 3 has an ATO/ATP system, so the driver must only check the doors and give consent to the electronic system to start the train.

== Lines 4 and 5 ==
Lines 4 and 5 use AnsaldoBreda Driverless Metro, consequently the lines do not have classical light signaling. Automatic signaling permits a frequency of a train every 75 seconds, but on Line 5 only a 150-second frequency is used, owing to the lack of big enough depot for the number of trains that would be needed; this may get fixed as the line gets its own depot, along with its planned extension into Monza.

== See also ==
- Italian railway signalling
