= Matteo Motterlini =

Italian philosopher

Matteo Motterlini (born 6 January 1967) is an Italian philosopher of science, behavioral and neuroeconomist. He teaches at Vita-Salute San Raffaele University of Milan, Italy.

== Academic career and publications ==
Former Adviser for Social and Behavioral Sciences for the Presidency of the Council of Ministers in Italy (appointed 5 May 2016 - ended March 2018)

Motterlini holds graduate degrees in Logic & Scientific Method and Economics from The London School of Economics and Political Science. He held teaching and research positions at Carnegie Mellon University (Dept. of Social and Decision Sciences, 1999–2000) and University of California Los Angeles (Dept. of Psychology, 2011–2012).

He is perhaps best known for his contribution to the field of philosophy of science and the history of ideas, mainly to the issue of the rationality of science and the debate "for and against method" with respect to the philosophical ideas of Imre Lakatos and Paul K. Feyerabend.

Based on the original material in the Lakatos Archive, he edited For and Against Method (1999, University of Chicago Press), including Lakatos's Lectures on Scientific Method and the Lakatos-Feyerabend Correspondence.

He investigates the neurological basis of human irrationality. His research focuses on the neural correlations of financial decision making, with a special reference to the role of emotions, regret, social learning and loss aversion.

He is director of the Center for Experimental and Applied Epistemology (CRESA) where he and his team design and the test ways in which neuro-behavioral economics findings may inform more effective evidence-based public policy.

He is also a prolific writer for general public and contributes regularly to several Italian newspapers, notably Il Corriere della sera and Il Sole 24 Ore. His pop-science books Economia emotiva (Emotional Economics) (2006, Rizzoli) and Trappole mentali (Mental Traps) (2008, Rizzoli) are worldwide best sellers with translations into Spanish, Korean, Japanese and Chinese. He was Scientific Advisor of AC Milan football club for six seasons from 2004 to 2010.
