= Crippa =

Crippa is an Italian surname. Notable people with the surname include:

- Alfonso Crippa (1905–1983), Italian racing cyclist
- Andrea Crippa (born 1986), Italian politician
- Dante Crippa (1937–2021), Italian footballer
- Edward D. Crippa (1899–1960), American politician
- Fábio Crippa (1928–2011), Brazilian footballer
- Fiorenzo Crippa (1926–2017), Italian racing cyclist
- Maddalena Crippa (born 1957), Italian actress
- Martina Crippa (born 1989), Italian basketball player
- Massimo Crippa (born 1965), Italian footballer
- Mauro Crippa (born 1959), Italian journalist and media executive
- Nekagenet Crippa (born 1994), Ethiopian-born Italian athlete, older brother of Yemaneberhan Crippa
- Salvatore Crippa (1914–1971), Italian road cyclist
- Yemaneberhan Crippa (born 1996), Ethiopian-born Italian athlete
