= Cologno Centro (Milan Metro) =

Milan metro station

Coordinates: 45.5273°N 9.2830°E

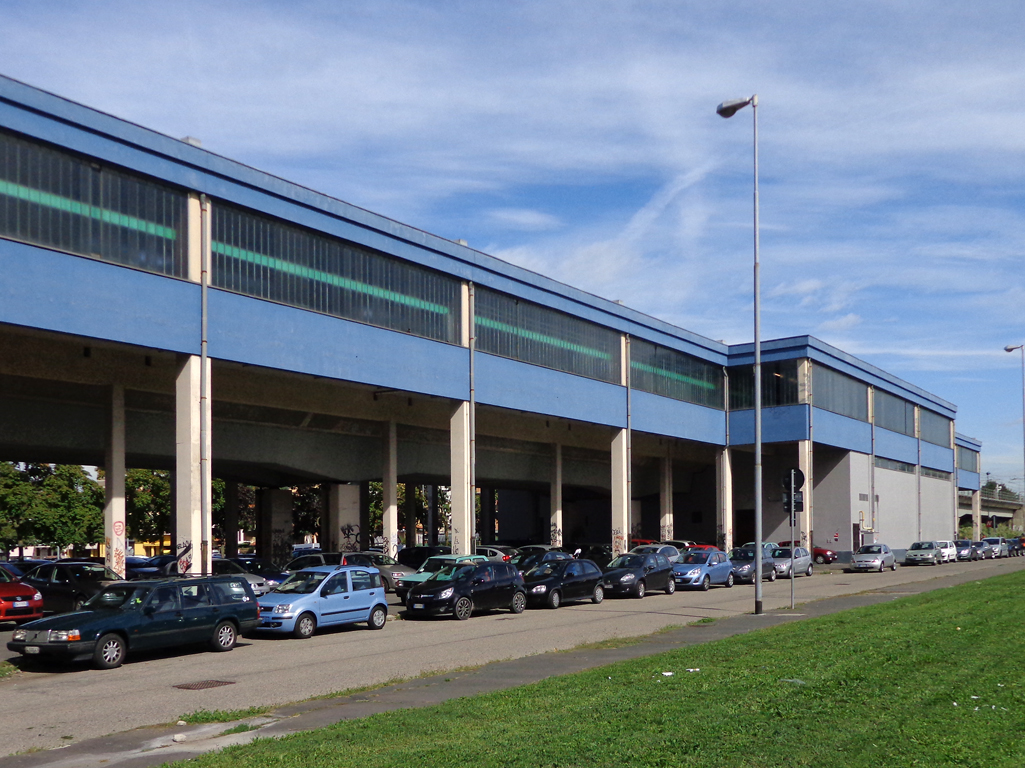

General information
- Location: Milan; Italy
- Owner: Azienda Trasporti Milanesi
- Platforms: 2
- Tracks: 2

Construction
- Structure type: Elevated

Other information
- Fare zone: STIBM: Mi3

History
- Opened: 7 June 1981; 45 years ago

Services
Preceding station	Milan Metro	Following station
Cologno Sud towards Assago or Abbiategrasso	Line 2	Cologno Nord Terminus
Location

Cologno Centro is a suburban station on Line 2 of the Milan Metro in the municipality of Cologno Monzese.

== History ==
The station was opened on 7 June 1981 with the opening of the Cologno Monzese branch from Cascina Gobba to Cologno Nord. In the early plans its name was simply Cologno.
