= Crescenzago (Milan Metro) =

Metro station in Milan, Italy

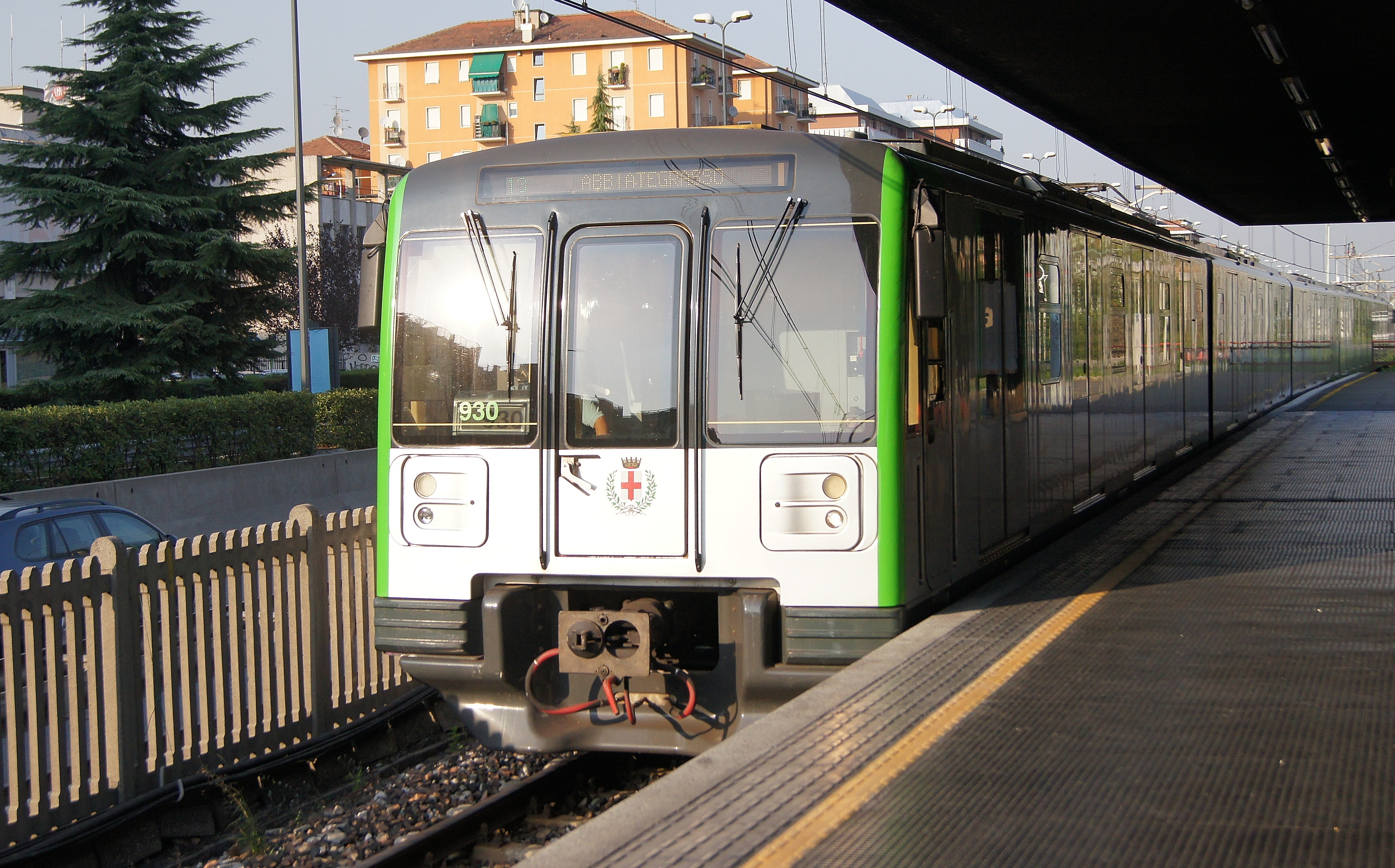

General information
- Location: Via Francesco Robino, Milan; Italy
- Coordinates: 45°30′17.5″N 9°14′52″E
- Owner: Azienda Trasporti Milanesi
- Platforms: 1
- Tracks: 2

Construction
- Structure type: Surface
- Accessible: y

Other information
- Fare zone: STIBM: Mi1

History
- Opened: 26 May 1969; 57 years ago as tramway stop 27 September 1969; 56 years ago as metro station

Services
| Preceding station | Milan Metro | Following station |
|---|---|---|
| Cimiano towards Assago or Abbiategrasso | Line 2 | Cascina Gobba towards Cologno Nord or Gessate |
Location

Crescenzago is a station on Line 2 of the Milan Metro. It was opened on 27 September 1969 as part of the inaugural section of Line 2, between Cascina Gobba and Caiazzo.

The station has no access for people with physical disabilities.
