= MeLA =

Automated shuttle transit route in Milan

Overview
- Native name: Metropolitana Leggera Automatica
- Locale: Milan, Italy
- Transit type: People mover
- Number of lines: 1
- Number of stations: 2

Operation
- Began operation: 1999

Technical
- System length: 682 m (2,238 ft)
- Top speed: 35 km/h (22 mph)

Map of the MeLA line

MeLA (Italian: Metropolitana Leggera Automatica) is a 682 m (2,238 ft)-long people mover in Milan's Zone 3. MeLA was completed on July 12, 1999, and is operated by Azienda Trasporti Milanesi and was the first automated people mover in Italy.

The line acts as a shuttle connecting Cascina Gobba Station on Line 2 of the Milan Metro with the nearby San Raffaele Hospital. Half of the line is underground as it passes through the San Raffaele Hospital complex. The line uses cable propulsion and has a top speed of 36 km/h.

In 2024 the line was suspended for extensive renovation but it is unknown when it will be working again.
