= Mauro Crippa =

Italian journalist (born 1959)

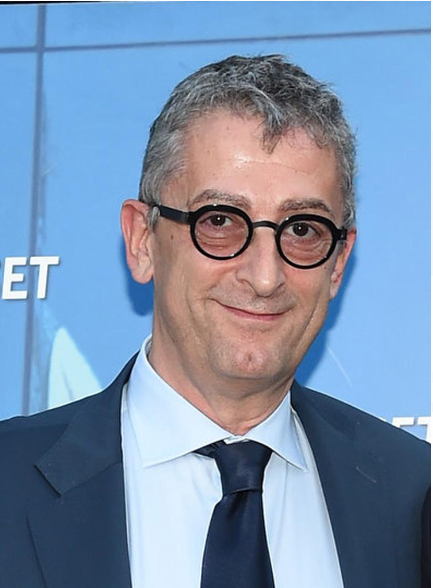
- Born: 26 April 1959 (age 67); Rome, Italy
- Education: Vita-Salute San Raffaele University
- Occupation: Manager
- Title: Chief Corporate Communication Officer, MediaForEurope

Mauro Crippa (born 26 April 1959 in Rome) is an Italian journalist and media executive. He serves as Chief Corporate Communication Officer of MediaForEurope and as Director General for News and Communication at Mediaset.

== Biography ==
He graduated in Philosophy from Vita-Salute San Raffaele University in Milan and began his career in 1984 at IBM Italy, working in internal and external communications.

In 1987, he joined Arnoldo Mondadori Editore, where he was responsible for institutional and product press relations.

In 1994, he joined the Fininvest Group as Director of Press Relations. He subsequently held various roles in the communications division of the Mediaset Group, where he headed the central communication and press relations department.

Over the course of his career, he has served on several boards of directors, including that of Società Europea, publisher of Il Giornale (1998–2023), the Mediaset Group (1998–2018), and RTI (since 1999). He has also been a board member of Class CNBC.

In 2010, he was appointed Director General for News at Mediaset, with responsibility for coordinating the group's news operations. Since 2019, he has headed the Videonews division.

In January 2024, he also assumed the role of Director of Communication and Image at Mediaset, while concurrently retaining his position as Director General for News. Since March 2026, he has been Chief Corporate Communication Officer of MediaForEurope.

He teaches political communication at IULM University and is a member of the Scientific Committee of the IULM Master's programme in Journalism.

=== Editorial activity ===
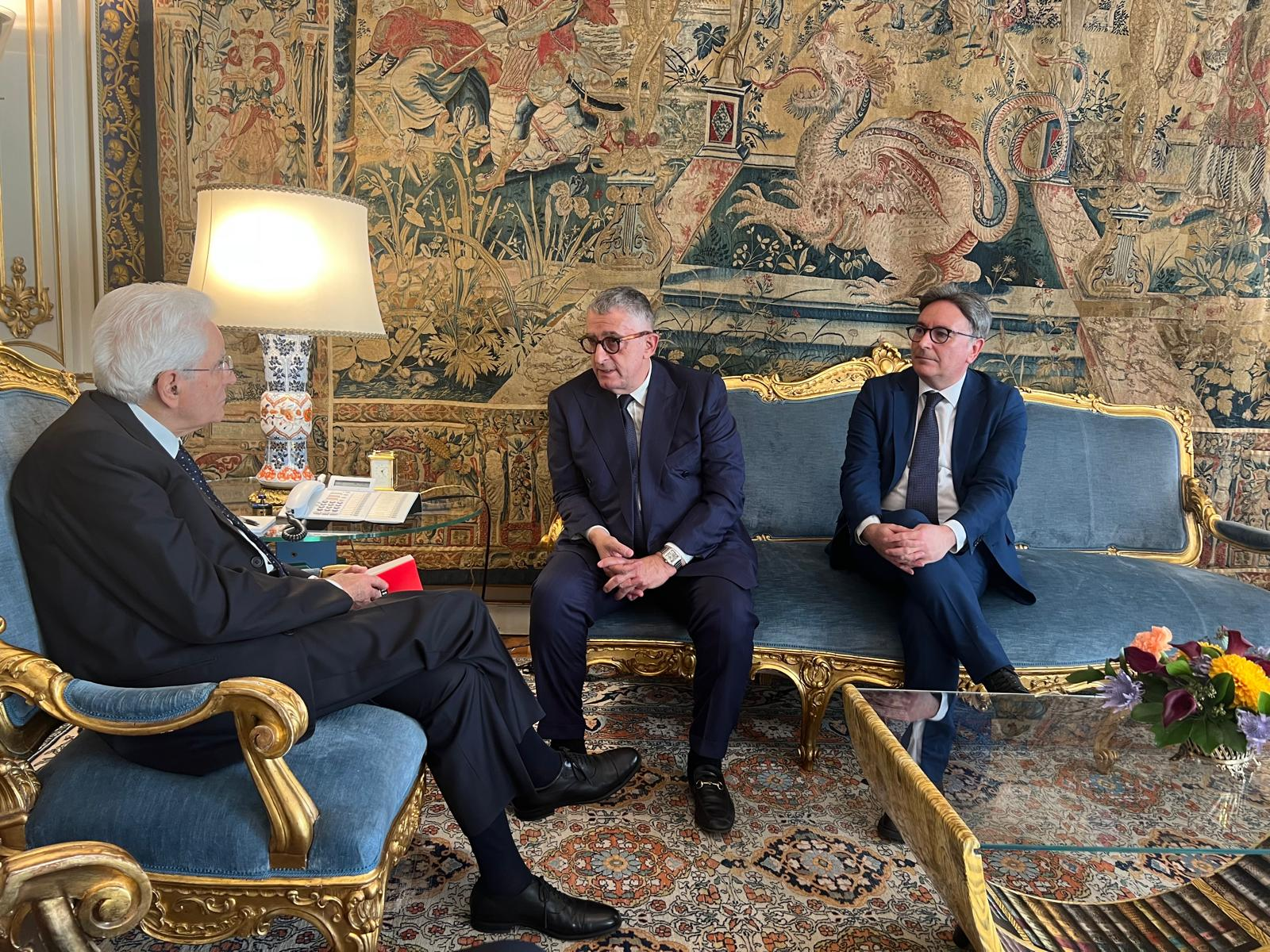
Mauro Crippa and Giuseppe Girgenti presenting a copy of Umano, poco umano to President of the Italian Republic Sergio Mattarella

In 2024, he co-authored, with philosopher Giuseppe Girgenti, the essay Umano, poco umano. Esercizi spirituali contro l'intelligenza artificiale, published by Piemme.

The book addresses the development of artificial intelligence from a philosophical and cultural perspective and has been presented at several institutional venues, including the Italian Senate, the Chamber of Deputies, and the Quirinale Palace.

== Books ==
- Crippa, Mauro; Girgenti, Giuseppe (2024). Umano, poco umano. Esercizi spirituali contro l'intelligenza artificiale (in Italian). Milan: Edizioni Piemme. ISBN 978-88-566-9417-8.
