= Mediaset =

Italian mass media company

Mediaset S.p.A.
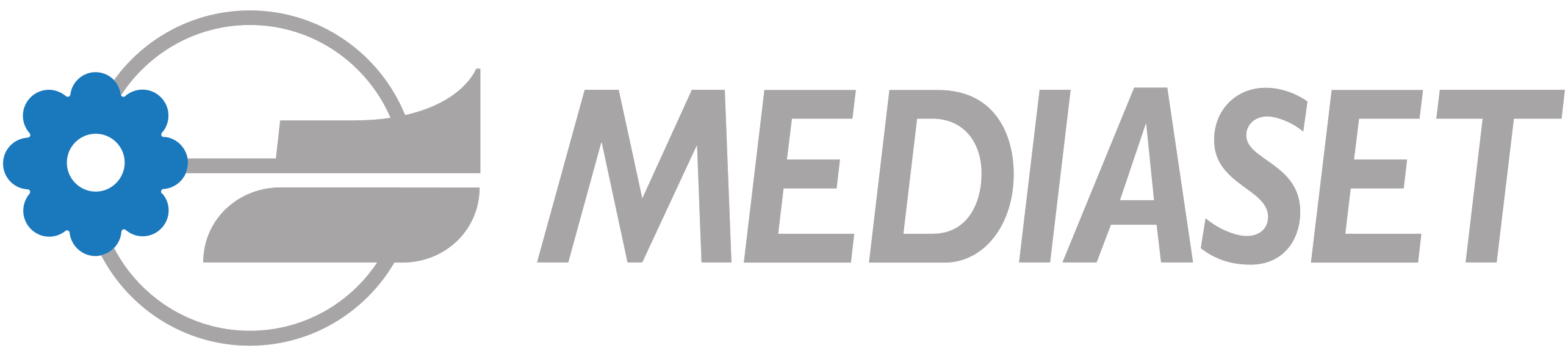
- Logo used since 2006

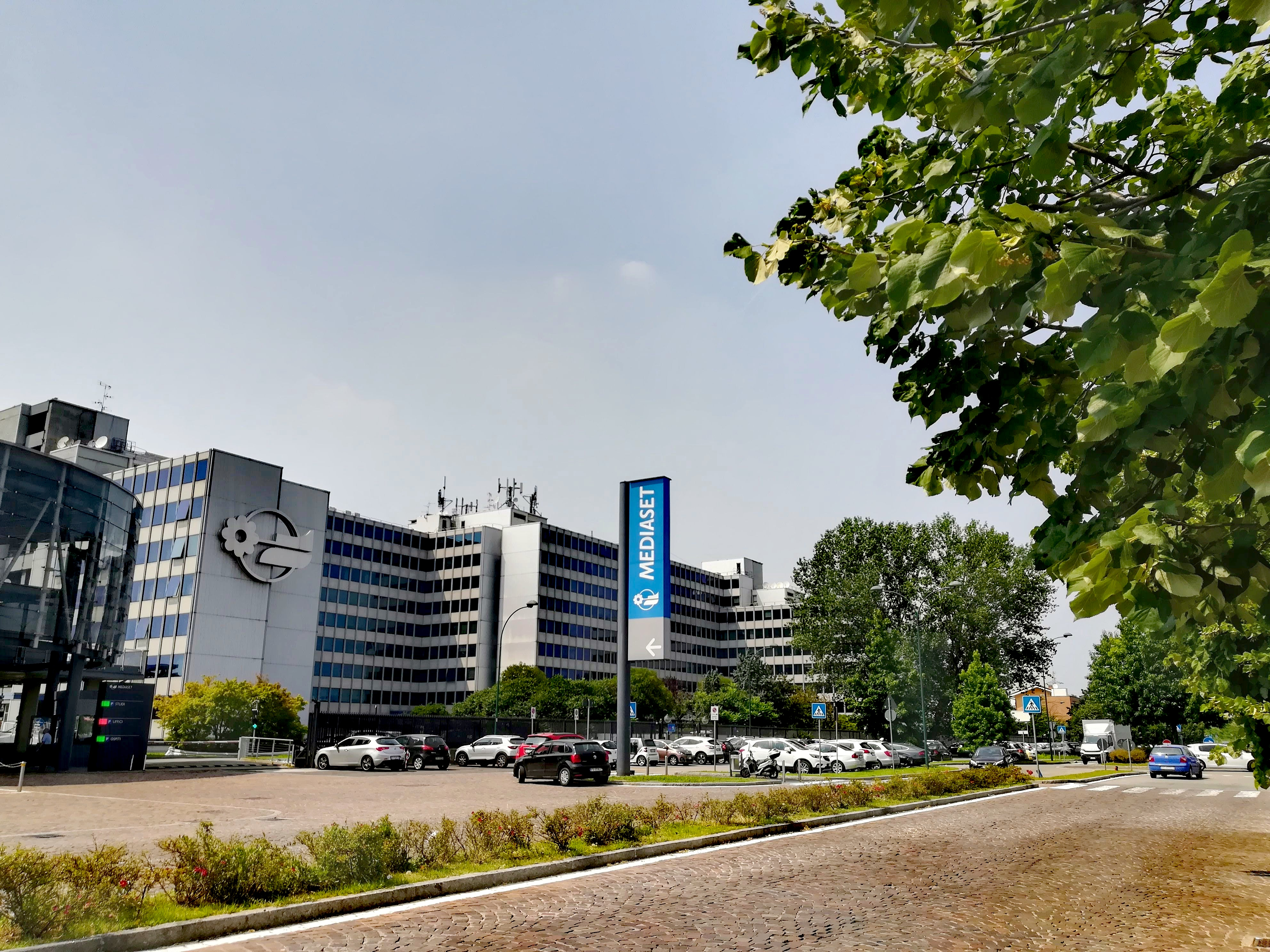
- Headquarters in Cologno Monzese (Milan)
- Formerly: Mediaset Italia S.p.A. (2019–2022)
- Type: Subsidiary
- Industry: Mass media
- Founded: 15 December 1993; 32 years ago (brand); 2019; 7 years ago (company)
- Founder: Silvio Berlusconi
- Headquarters: Cologno Monzese, Milan, Italy
- Key people: Pier Silvio Berlusconi (CEO)
- Products: Free-to-air and subscription television broadcasting Radio; Television Production
- Revenue: ▲€2.801 billion (2022)
- Net income: ▲€471 million (2018)
- Owner: MFE – MediaForEurope
- Number of employees: ▲4,858 (2022)
- Subsidiaries: Reti Televisive Italiane; Publitalia '80
- Website: www.mediaset.it

Mediaset S.p.A. is an Italian mass media and television production and distribution company that is the largest commercial broadcaster in the country. The company is controlled by the holding company MFE – MediaForEurope (the original iteration of Mediaset S.p.A., a.k.a. the Mediaset Group), which is majority-owned by the Berlusconi family's Fininvest Group. Stemming from a business founded in 1987 by entrepreneur and later Italian prime minister Silvio Berlusconi, Mediaset competes primarily against the public broadcaster RAI, the privately owned La7 and (through Sky Group Limited) Comcast's Sky Italia.

Mediaset's headquarters are in Milan, Lombardy. Many of its studios were located in the Milano 2 area of Segrate, a municipality bordering Milan, where broadcasts of local station TeleMilano (now airing nationally as Mediaset's Canale 5) began in 1978. After merging with various local broadcasters to form the Canale 5 syndication, production was moved to Cologno Monzese, where the infrastructure of the former Telealtomilanese was present. The company currently has two main television production centres, in Cologno Monzese and Rome.

In 2019, Mediaset transferred its corporate functions to the Netherlands and as a result, the Italian operations were taken over by a wholly owned subsidiary of Mediaset which began operations that year.

== History ==
=== Starting in late 1970s ===
Silvio Berlusconi's involvement in the television industry began in 1978, with Telemilano, a local Milan-based broadcaster that became Canale 5 two years later and began broadcasting nationally. Canale 5 was subsequently joined by Italia 1 (bought from the publishing group Rusconi in 1982) and Rete 4 (acquired from Arnoldo Mondadori Editore in 1984). The television area was called RTI and became established with three national analogue networks, supported by an advertising sales company, Publitalia '80, that exclusively collects advertising for all three channels and two other companies, Videotime, that manages TV technology and production activities, and Elettronica Industriale that guarantees signal distribution through the management of the broadcasting infrastructure. In 1987, it bought out Italian's leading home video distributor Domovideo, in a seesaw contest with Vincenzo Romangoli.

In the 1980s, Berlusconi's company Fininvest was contracted to operate TV Koper-Capodistria, a TV station which was intended to serve Italian-speaking audiences in the region of Istria, Slovenia, Yugoslavia, but was widely available in Italy through cable systems. Under Fininvest's control, the station mainly operated as a sports channel. This arrangement ended in 1990.

In 1990, Silvio Berlusconi Communications entered into a partnership with DIC Enterprises and having SBC subsidiary Reteitalia S.p.A. and Spanish TV channel Telecinco (which SBC held a stake) to co-produce shows, a relationship that lasted until 1994.

The subsidiary production company Mediavivere was created in 1999 specifically to produce the Italian soap opera Vivere, which was broadcast on Canale 5 from 1999 to 2007 and on Rete 4 from 2007 to 2008. The company also produced the soap opera CentoVetrine, which aired on Canale 5 from 2001 to 2016, as well as several television miniseries between 2006 and 2015. Mediavivere was dissolved in 2016.

=== 2010s ===
Eutelsat's Hotbird satellite on Canale 5, Italia 1 and Rete 4 channels are fully encrypted as of 7 September 2015. To continue watching, you will need to purchase the Tivùsat decoder and smartcard, which do not require a monthly subscription, only in Italy. Before 7 September 2015, the 3 Mediaset free channels were encrypted via satellite due to some copyrighted programs and sports events. Mediaset's news channel TGcom24 continues to broadcast free-to-air via satellite.

=== 2020s ===
In October 2021, the headquarters of Mediaset S.p.A. was relocated to Amsterdam, becoming Mediaset N.V.

In November 2021, Mediaset announced a major restructuring, under which it would form a new parent company, MFE – MediaForEurope N.V., which would be domiciled in the Netherlands.

== Holdings ==
=== Premium-tier channels ===
| Channel | LCN on DVB-T | LCN on Sky | Launched | Closed | Description |
|---|---|---|---|---|---|
| Premium Action | 459 | – | 1 April 2013 | 10 January 2022 | Television series |
| Premium Action HD | – | 125 | 23 June 2015 | 10 January 2022 | Television series |
| Premium Crime | 503 | – | 1 July 2011 | 10 January 2022 | Television series |
| Premium Crime HD | – | 10 | 23 June 2015 | 10 January 2022 | Television series |
| Premium Stories | 462 | – | 23 June 2015 | 10 January 2022 | Television series |
| Premium Stories HD | – | 14 | 4 June 2018 | 10 January 2022 | Television series |
| Premium Cinema 1 | 463 | – | 1 July 2020 | 10 January 2022 | Films |
| Premium Cinema 1 HD | – | 313 | 1 July 2020 | 10 January 2022 | Films |
| Premium Cinema 1 +24 HD | – | 314 | 1 July 2020 | 10 January 2022 | Films |
| Premium Cinema 2 | 464 | – | 1 July 2020 | 10 January 2022 | Films |
| Premium Cinema 2 HD | – | 315 | 1 July 2020 | 10 January 2022 | Films |
| Premium Cinema 3 | 465 | – | 1 July 2020 | 10 January 2022 | Films |
| Premium Cinema 3 HD | – | 316 | 1 July 2020 | 10 January 2022 | Films |

=== Radio ===
On 1 July 2016, the radio activities were merged into the new company RadioMediaset, whose presidency Paolo Salvaderi was appointed. The company deals with the editorial activities of: Radio Monte Carlo, R101, Radio 105 Network, Virgin Radio, Radio Subasio and their respective television networks.

=== Streaming service ===
- Mediaset Infinity

=== International service ===
- Mediaset Italia

== Impact ==
A 2019 study in The American Economic Review examined the impact of Mediaset on Italy during its rollout in the 1980s. The study compared the voting habits of people who grew up in towns and regions that got early access to Mediaset against ones who only got late access to Mediaset. The study noted that Mediaset's programming, especially during the 80s & 90s, was far more slanted toward entertainment and contained far less news and educational content than its competitors, the RAI and Telemontecarlo. It also concluded that "individuals with early access to Mediaset all-entertainment content were more likely to vote for Berlusconi's party in 1994 when he first ran for office... we find that individuals exposed to entertainment TV as children were less cognitively sophisticated and civic-minded as adults, and ultimately more vulnerable to Berlusconi's populist rhetoric." The study said the effect included populist parties in general that offered simple slogans and easy cure-alls, including non-Berlusconi populist parties such as the Five Star Movement.

=== Criticism ===
The network has been heavily criticized over the years by other media and journalists in Italy because of the direct link to politic person of Berlusconi and of the content of some shows: the broadcaster was repeatedly cited as "Merdaset" (rephrasing with the word merda, the Italian for "shit") by some journalists.

== Lawsuits ==
=== Europa 7 ===
In January 2008, the European Court of Justice ruled that the TV frequencies used by Mediaset to broadcast Rete 4 were shared out unfairly. They should have been given to Europa 7, a competitor channel, the judges maintain, and Rete 4 should be broadcast via satellite instead. Although the Italian Council of State, the highest court on administrative matters, has confirmed that the Italian government should abide by this European ruling, Rete 4 continues its operation on analogue frequencies and on DVB-T.

=== Google ===
On 30 July 2008, Mediaset filed a lawsuit against Google for €500 million (US$779 million) charging copyright infringement. The company stated that 325 hours worth of material was uploaded to YouTube and the result was the loss of 315,672 viewing days and ad revenue.

=== Sky Italia ===
On 16 September 2009, Sky Italia (owned by the original News Corporation at the time) filed a lawsuit to the Court of Milan, Italy, against Reti Televisive Italiane and Publitalia '80 for a violation of Article 82 of European Treaty that regulates free economic competition between companies, in particular for refusing to allow Sky Italia to purchase advertising on the three main Mediaset television channels (Canale 5, Italia 1 and Rete 4), exercising Article 700 of the Italian Civil Procedural Code who permit to require an urgent action. Mediaset has rejected the charge of antitrust violations, stating that in 2009 it had broadcast Sky Italia commercials 3107 times on its channels, whereas Sky Italia has always refused to broadcast Mediaset commercials.

== See also ==
- TGCOM, an Italian news website owned by Mediaset
- Television in Italy
- Mauro Crippa
- Sport Mediaset
