= Cimiano =

Coordinates: 45.499963°N 9.244308°E

- Quartier of Milan
- Interactive map of Cimiano
- Country: Italy
- Region: Lombardy
- Province: Milan
- Comune: Milan
- Zone: 3
- Time zone: UTC+1 (CET)
  - Summer (DST): UTC+2 (CEST)

Cimiano (Lombard: Cimian [tʃiˈmjãː]) is a district (quartiere) of Milan, Italy. It is located within the Zone 3 administrative division, north-east of the city centre. The Milan Metro (Line 2) stops at Cimiano.

The name "Cimiano" is a contraction of cimiliano, meaning "next to Milan".

The oldest known reference to the settlement is in a 10th Century Lombards manuscript. It was an autonomous comune until 1757, when it was annexed to Crescenzago, which in turn became part of Milan in 1923.

The Rizzoli publishing house, one of the major publishing houses in Italy, is based in Cimiano.
