= Cologno Monzese =

Cologno Monzese Cològn (Lombard)
- Comune
- Città di Cologno Monzese
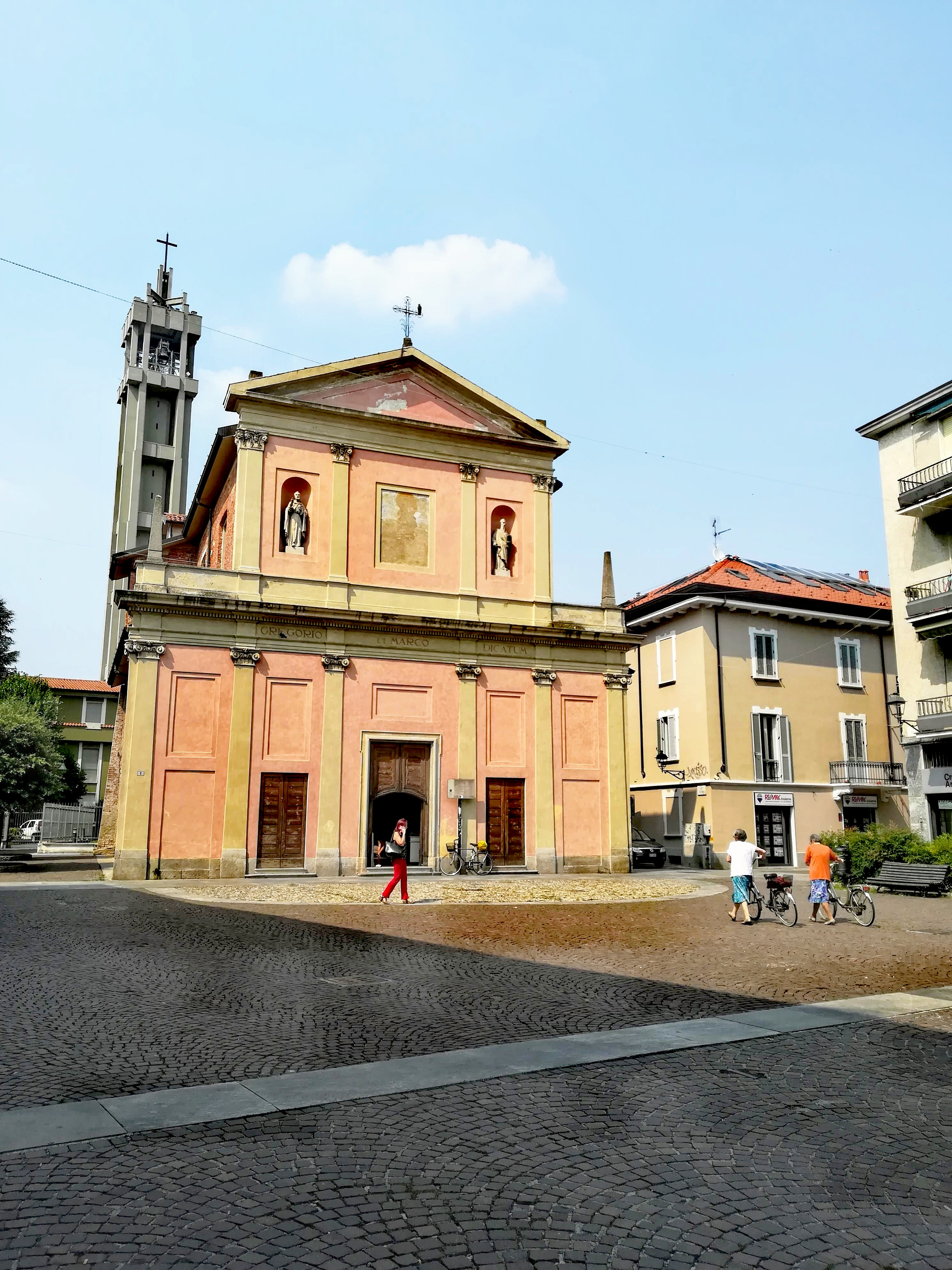

- Coat of arms

- Location within Italy Location within Lombardy
- Coordinates: 45°31′42.98″N 9°16′41.78″E
- Country: Italy
- Region: Lombardy
- Metropolitan city: Milan (MI)
- Frazioni: San Maurizio al Lambro, San Giuliano Monzese

Government
  - Mayor: Angelo Rocchi

Area
  - Total: 8.4 km^{2} (3.2 sq mi)
- Elevation: 134 m (440 ft)

Population (31 March 2018)
  - Total: 47,749
  - Density: 5,700/km^{2} (15,000/sq mi)
- Demonym: Colognesi
- Time zone: UTC+1 (CET)
  - Summer (DST): UTC+2 (CEST)
- Postal code: 20093
- Dialing code: 02
- Website: Official website

Cologno Monzese (Milanese: Cològn [kuˈlɔɲ]) is a comune (municipality) in the Metropolitan City of Milan in the Italian region of Lombardy, located about 5 kilometres (3 mi) northeast of Milan. The population increased substantially after World War II, when many people from Southern Italy settled here (especially from Apulia).

After being subject for a long time to the influence exerted by San Maurizio al Lambro (which is now part of the municipality as a hamlet) Cologno received the honorary title of city with a presidential decree on 19 September 1996.

== Main sights ==
Sights in Cologno include Villa Casati, the seat of the comune, and San Giuliano, a medieval Romanesque church. Part of the commune is included in the Media Valle del Lambro Park.

The TV studios of Mediaset and some radio networks (RTL 102.5, Radio Italia and Radio TRS) are located here.

== Transport ==
The town is served by three stations of the Milan Metro: Cologno Nord (North), Cologno Centro (Centre) and Cologno Sud (South). The nearest airport is Linate, in Milan, but Malpensa is not far. Cologno is also linked up with Milan by the Tangenziale Est, an orbital motorway that surrounds the capital city of Lombardy.

== People ==
- J-Ax (born 1972), rapper
- Gianluca Gazzoli (born 1988), radio personality, television presenter and YouTuber
- Grido (born 1979), rapper
