= Italian railway signalling =

Italian railway gadgets

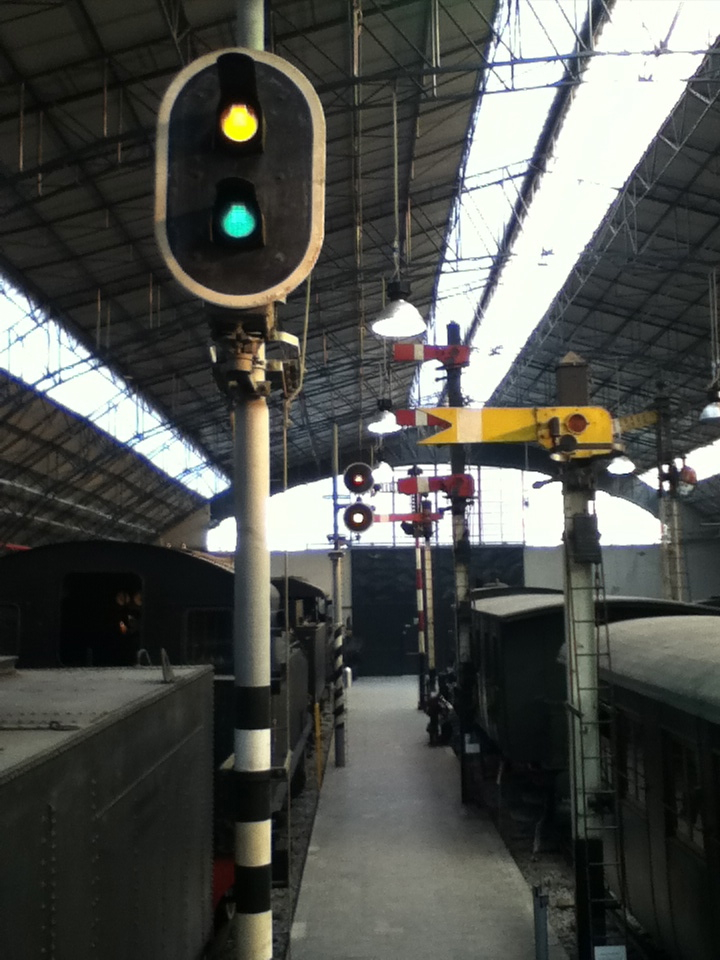
Historical and current signals

The Italian railway signalling currently in use, employed on the Italian national railway network, is regulated by the "Regulation on signals" (Regolamento sui segnali), issued by the Italian railway infrastructure manager, RFI (Rete Ferroviaria Italiana, part of the FSI Group).

Signals have historically been derived from early British semaphore signals, along with the practice of running on the left side on double track main lines. Consequently, signals are placed on the left of the tracks.

Current practice makes use of light signals of the "searchlight" type on conventional lines, and of the ERTMS cab signalling on high-speed lines.

== Historic development ==
The signalling practice in the early days of Italian railways was not dissimilar to that employed in Britain at the time, where trains were separated by means of either a fixed timetable operation on single track lines or by police officers handsignalling trains on a "time interval working" system. The introduction of the telegraph in the 1840s allowed then for the introduction of the telegraphic block system. Disc signals, probably of French origin, first, and then semaphore signals were introduced. The use of light signals dates to about 1925, along with the introduction of the telephone block and the dirigente unico method of operation, while the modern "searchlight" signals are in use since 1947.

== Modern signalling ==
Modern Italian light signals (segnali permanentemente luminosi) are of the "searchlight" type that can show red, yellow and green through a single aperture. As in British practice, signals are normally placed to the left of the track that they govern and have a black circular background with a white border (vela). In some cases, signals are placed on the right of the track and have a squared background. A signal can have up to three lights, or "arms", and their aspects may be fixed or blinking. Italian light signals can either be "Category 1 signals" (segnali di 1° categoria) or "Distant signals" (segnali di avviso).

Distant signals are light signals which cannot display a red — stop — aspect: therefore, they are normally used to govern the approach to main signals, especially on single track lines. A third type of signal, called "Coupled Category 1 and Distant signals" (segnali di 1° categoria e di avviso accoppiati), or simply "Coupled signals" (segnali accoppiati), can show the combination of both Category 1 and Distant signals at the same time.

=== Category 1 signals ===
Category 1 signals are placed right before the danger point and act as a basic stop/go signals, indicating if the block section in the rear is occupied or not. They are used mainly as "starting signals" (segnali di partenza) or on "block signals" (segnali di blocco) in "non-coupled block" lines (blocco non concatenato) — provided that the next signal is the Distant for the following Category 1 signal. The reduced speed limit (which can be either 30, 60 or 100 km/h) is indicated by the preceding Distant signal or by an auxiliary speed indication (segnalazione ausiliaria di limite di velocità), informally known as "rappel".

| Category 1 signal aspects | | |
|---|---|---|
| Stop (via impedita) | Proceed (via libera) | Proceed at reduced speed (via libera con conferma di riduzione di velocità) |

=== Distant signals ===
Because a train running at speed takes a long distance to stop, train drivers must have advanced warning of the aspect of a Category 1 signal ahead. This is the function of the distant signal, which is placed at a distance of 800, 1000, or 1200 meters on the approach of the relevant main signal, depending on permissible speed and gradient of the line concerned. If the distant signal is showing a 'proceed' indication, the train can continue running at speed. If, however, a 'cautionary' indication is displayed, the driver must be prepared to obey to the Category 1 signal ahead. Distant signals can be distinguished from Category 1 and Coupled signals by their striped masts.

| Distant signal aspects | | | | | |
|---|---|---|---|---|---|
| Proceed (avviso di via libera) | Approach 100 km/h (avviso di via libera a 100 km/h) | Approach 60 km/h (avviso di via libera a 60 km/h) | Approach 30 km/h (avviso di via libera a 30 km/h) | Advance approach (avviso anticipato) | Approach (avviso di via impedita) |

The "approach" and "advance approach" indications are rather peculiar. The "approach" aspect does not simply tell to expect the next signal showing stop, it instructs the driver to "approach the signal prepared to stop, not exceeding 30 km/h at least 200 meters (≈ 650 ft) before the signal." This controlled speed is called "approach speed" (velocità di approccio). The "advance approach" aspect tells the driver to expect the next but one main signal showing either stop or proceed at reduced speed, but at limited braking distance: within station limits, the placement of "home signals" (segnali di protezione) and "starting signals" is usually affected by the location of points and turnouts, so that the space between them might be less than the standard braking distance.

=== Coupled signals ===
If a Distant signal is close to a preceding Category 1 signal (i.e. when the distance between two consecutive Category 1 signals is equal to or lower than 1,500 meters, or a maximum of 2,000 meters in special cases), the Distant signal is combined into the preceding Category 1 signal to form a single signal carrying out both functions. That is, a Coupled signal (segnale accoppiato) can show the combination of both signal types. This arrangement is employed to add more block sections between two stations, thus increasing capacity: a train would normally run on Coupled signals only from full speed to a stop with a sequence of green, (flashing yellow,) yellow, and red aspects. If more than one route is available, a second arm (signal head) is added, as per the "proceed at reduced speed" indication shown by Category 1 signals. This will be reflected by a second arm at the preceding signal, as per the various "approach speed" indications shown by Distant signals. But "Coupled signals" can show speed restrictions combined with Distant aspects too, so a third arm may (or may not) be added: in this case, the first arm will stay red, as a "placeholder" indicating that the train cannot proceed at track speed, while the second and third arms will then show the relevant distant aspect, for the signal ahead. (This practice originates from the so-called splitting signals at junctions.)

| | Coupled signal aspects | | | | | |
|---|---|---|---|---|---|---|
| | Proceed (... con avviso di via libera) | Approach 100 km/h (... con avviso di via libera a 100 km/h) | Approach 60 km/h (... con avviso di via libera a 60 km/h) | Approach 30 km/h (... con avviso di via libera a 30 km/h) | Advance approach (... con avviso anticipato) | Approach (... con avviso di via impedita) |
| This signal: "proceed" (via libera...), next signal: ... | | | | | | |
| This signal: "proceed at reduced speed" (via libera con conferma di riduzione di velocità a 30/60/100 km/h...), next signal: ... | | | | | | |

=== Other aspects and indications ===
There are two more Category 1 signal aspects, usually shown on "home signals", which instruct the driver to proceed cautiously towards a buffer stop or an occupied or a very short track.

| Aspect | Meaning | Aspect | Meaning |
|---|---|---|---|
| | Proceed with caution towards a buffer stop, an occupied track, or a red signal at abnormally reduced distance (350–600 meters). | | Proceed at reduced speed (30 km/h) and with caution towards a buffer stop, an occupied track, or a red signal at abnormally reduced distance (350–600 meters). Unlike other "reduced speed" aspects, this signal is always preceded by a single yellow signal and not a "reduce to 30 km/h" one! |
| | Auxiliary speed indication — "rappel". With a single white bar, the signal authorizes a maximum speed of 60 km/h. | | Auxiliary speed indication — "rappel". With two white bars, the signal authorizes a maximum speed of 100 km/h. |

== Positioning ==
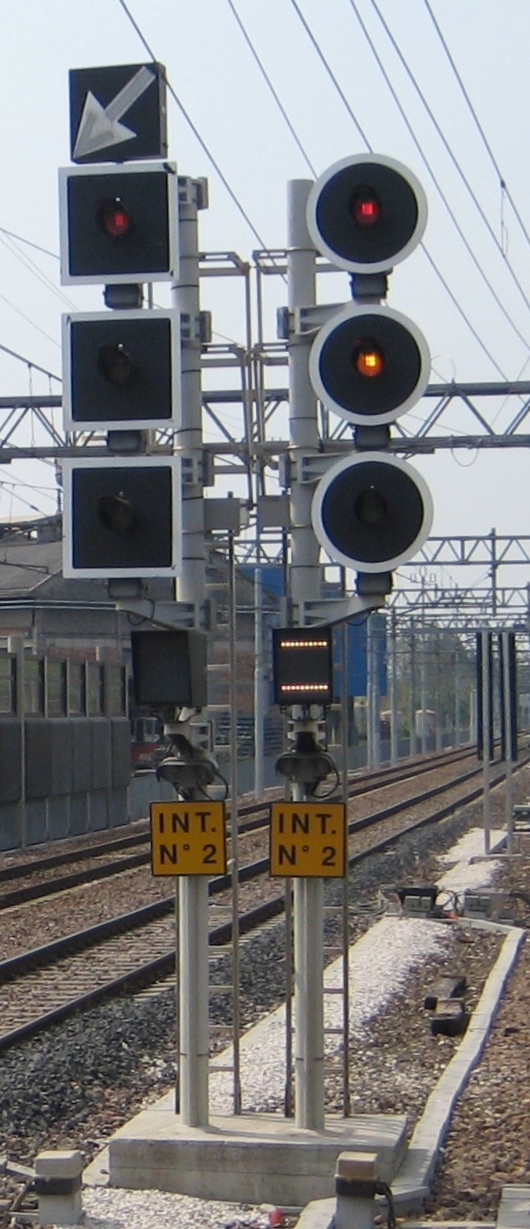
example of signals placed left and right of tracks under control. Note the square plates

Signals are placed on the left of the tracks except where there is no space to do so, in which case they are placed on the right hand and square plates are used instead of round ones.

== Train protection system ==
As Train protection system the following are used in Italy:

- RS4 Codici
- RS9 Codici (Blocco Automatico a Correnti Codificate, BACC)
- Sistema Controllo Marcia Treno (SCMT)
- Sistema Supporto Condotta (SSC)
- European Train Control System (ETCS)
