= San Raffaele Hospital =

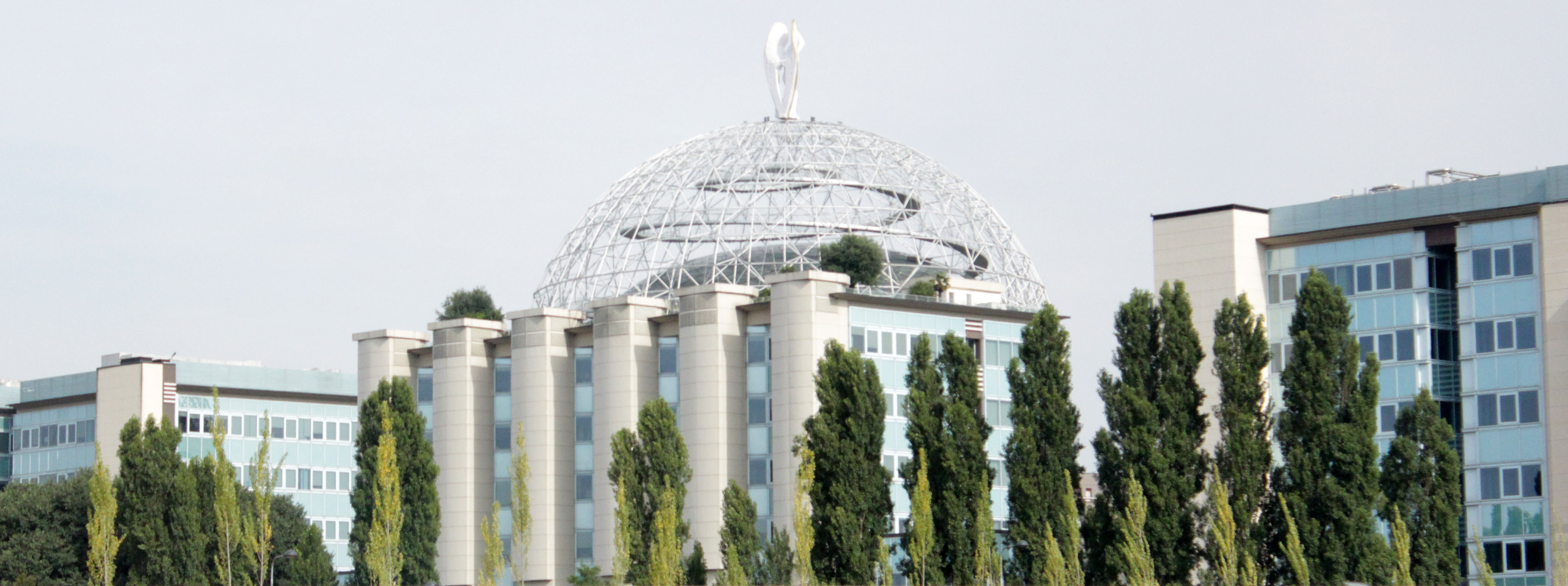

Geography
- Location: Segrate, province of Milan, Italy
- Coordinates: 45.505636°N 9.265605°E

Organisation
- Funding: Private
- Type: General
- Affiliated university: Vita-Salute San Raffaele University

Services
- Emergency department: I
- Beds: 1,350

History
- Opened: 1969

Links
- Website: www.sanraffaele.org
- Lists: Hospitals in Italy

The San Raffaele Hospital, known in Italian as Istituto scientifico universitario San Raffaele or Ospedale San Raffaele (HSR), is a university hospital situated in Segrate, in the province of Milan, Italy. It was founded in 1969 by don Luigi Maria Verzé, president of "Fondazione San Raffaele del Monte Tabor". The facility is connected to the Milan Metro by the MeLA people mover.

The hospital is affiliated with the School of Medicine and the School of Nursing of the Vita-Salute San Raffaele University.

== Facility ==
=== Structure ===
The HSR is divided in different sectors:

- Sector A
- Sector B
- Sector C (Emergency Department)
- Sector D
- Sector G (Outpatient Clinic)
- Sector Q
- Sector R (Central Admittance, Radiology, Endoscopy)
- DiMeR (Department of Riabilitative Medicine)
- San Raffaele Turro (SRT)
- HSR Resnati

=== Departments & Wards ===
==== Arrhythmology Department ====
- Arrhythmology and Electrophysiology

==== Cardio-Thoracic-Vascular Department ====
- Clinical Cardiology
- Cardiac Catheterization Laboratory
- Cardiac Surgery
- Thoracic Surgery
- Vascular Surgery
- Cardiothoracic Intensive Care Unit
- Coronary Care Unit
- Rehabilitation - Functional Rieducation Service

==== General and Specialistic Surgery Department ====
- Esophagus-Gastric and Colo-Rectal Surgery
- Endocrino-pancreatic Surgery
- Hepato-biliary Surgery
- Orthopedics and Traumatology
- General Intensive Care Unit
- Gastroenterology and G.I. Endoscopy
- Day-Surgery Center

==== Head-Neck District Department ====
- Neurosurgery
- Ophthalmology
- E.N.T.
- Neuroradiology
- Neurosurgical Intensive Care Unit

==== Infectious Diseases Department ====
- Infectious Diseases
- Day Hospital Infectious Diseases

==== Maternal Department ====
- Gynaecology
- Obstetrics
- Birth Sciences Day-Surgery
- Pediatrics
- Neonatology - Neonatal Intensive Care Unit
- IME

==== Specialistic and Internal Medicine Department ====
- Endocrinology - Diabetology
- Allergology
- Nephrology
- Transplants Unit

==== Neurological Department ====
- Neurology - Stroke Unit
- Neurorehabilitation
- Neurophysiology

==== Clinical Neurosciences Department ====
- Neurology - San Raffaele Turro
- Sleep Center
- Psychiatry
- Clinical Psychology

==== Oncology Department ====
- Oncology
- Hematology - Bone Marrow Transplant Unit
- Medical Oncology Service
- Radiotherapy - Nuclear Medicine
- Oncological Day-Hospital - Arianne Line

==== Radiology Department ====
- Radiology
- Radiology - San Raffaele Turro

==== Urological Department ====
- Urology
- Urology - San Raffaele Turro

==== Emergency Department ====
- E.R. - Trauma Center

==== Other Wards & Services ====
- Blood Center
- Dermatology
- Laboratory Medicine
- Morgue
- Odontoiatry
- Pathology
- Pharmacy
- Plastic Aesthetic and Reconstructive Surgery
