= Vita-Salute San Raffaele University =

Private university in Milan, Italy

- Università Vita-Salute San Raffaele
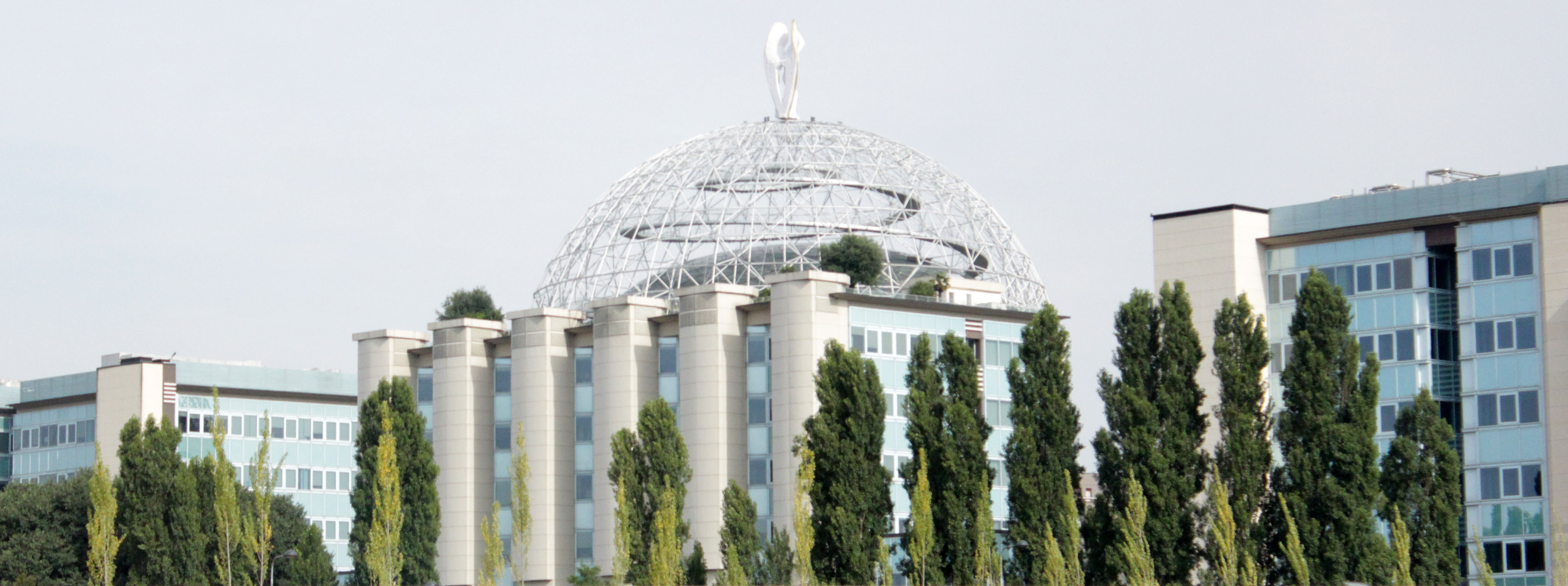
- Ospedale San Raffaele, 2013
- Other names: UniSR
- Motto: Quid est homo? (What is man that thou are so mindful of him)
- Type: Private, not-for-profit
- Established: 1996
- Affiliations: San Raffaele Hospital
- Rector: Prof. Enrico Felice Gherlone
- Location: Milan, Lombardy, Italy; 45.5074°N 9.2677°E
- Sporting affiliations: CUS Milano
- Website: unisr.it medicine.unisr.it (International MD Program)

Vita-Salute San Raffaele University (Italian: Università Vita-Salute San Raffaele, also known as UniSR) is a private, not for-profit university in Milan, Italy. The university was founded in 1996 within the Opera San Raffaele by Don Luigi Maria Verzé, who was its rector until his death in 2011. The university is affiliated with the San Raffaele Hospital in Milan, which in 2012 became part of the San Donato Hospital Group.

In the Censis Ranking of Italian Universities, the Vita-Salute San Raffaele University has often ranked first in the ranking for the degree course in Medicine and Surgery.

Vita-Salute San Raffaele University is also well-known for its high research output and international recognition. According to the 2025 QS World University Rankings, UniSR ranked first in Italy for citations per faculty and for faculty-student ratio, reflecting both research impact and teaching quality. The university was placed in the 201–250 bracket globally in the Times Higher Education World University Rankings 2025, and within the 126–150 range in the subject area of clinical and health sciences. Its close affiliation with the San Raffaele Hospital, a leading research and clinical institution, further enhances its medical education and translational research opportunities.

== History and profile ==
The Vita-Salute San Raffaele University was first established in 1996 with the Department of Psychology stemming from the Department of Cognitive Science founded by Massimo Piattelli-Palmarini with Andrea Moro in 1993. The program follows the general-cognitive and the experimental-clinical lines of thought.

The San Raffaele College and University was fundamentally born as the offspring of an internationally renowned research hospital structure, where students attend basic research laboratories in many research fields, including neurology, neurosurgery, diabetology, molecular biology, AIDS studies among others. It has expanded since then to include research fields in Cognitive Science and Philosophy. Among the issues that are being studied in this university, beside clinical issues, are: philosophy of science, perception, biolinguistics, generative grammar and vision.

University rankings

Global – Overall
- QS World: =461 (2026)

The Faculty of Medicine and Surgery proposes courses in Medicine and Surgery and in Biotechnology, both with strong scientific connotations, where the students go on ward rounds from their very first year. Moreover, the University Courses in Nursing and in Physiotherapy offer advanced teaching together with intense practical clinical training. In addition to these courses the Vita-Salute San Raffaele University also houses a number of Medical Training Programmes.

From 1999 a new Department has been created: the Department of Philosophy.

A new medical course was commenced alongside the Italian medical course in 2010. The International MD Program at Vita-Salute San Raffaele University has been designed to foster a new kind of doctor. This doctor will possess the necessary human, cultural, and professional values to provide healthcare and share ideas in today's globalized world. The course is entirely in English and offers an innovative curriculum. Half of the seats are reserved for Italian and EU citizens while the other half for Non-EU citizens, making it truly international.

On July 18, 2011, the Italian national newspaper Il Sole 24 Ore published a general ranking of Italian universities. Vita-Salute San Raffaele University was awarded the top placement among Italian private universities.

The university has two student residences on campus; Cascina Melghera and Cassinella.

== Departments ==
=== Medicine ===
- Advanced Degree Course of Medicine and Surgery (in Italian)
- International MD Program (in English)
- Degree Course in Nursing
- Degree Course in Physiotherapy
- Degree Course in Dental Care
- Degree Course in Biotechnology
- Advanced Degree Course of Medical, Molecular and Cellular Biotechnology

=== Psychology ===
- Degree Course in Psychological Sciences
- Advanced Degree Course of Clinical Psychology
- Advanced Interdepartmental Degree Course in Cognitive Neuroscience (including dept. of Medical Studies and Philosophy)
- Degree Course of Sciences of Communication

=== Philosophy ===
- Degree Course in Philosophy
- Advanced Degree Course in Philosophy
- PhD Program in Philosophy and Cognitive Sciences

== See also ==
- San Raffaele Hospital
- List of Italian universities
