= Cascina Gobba (Milan Metro) =

Milan metro station

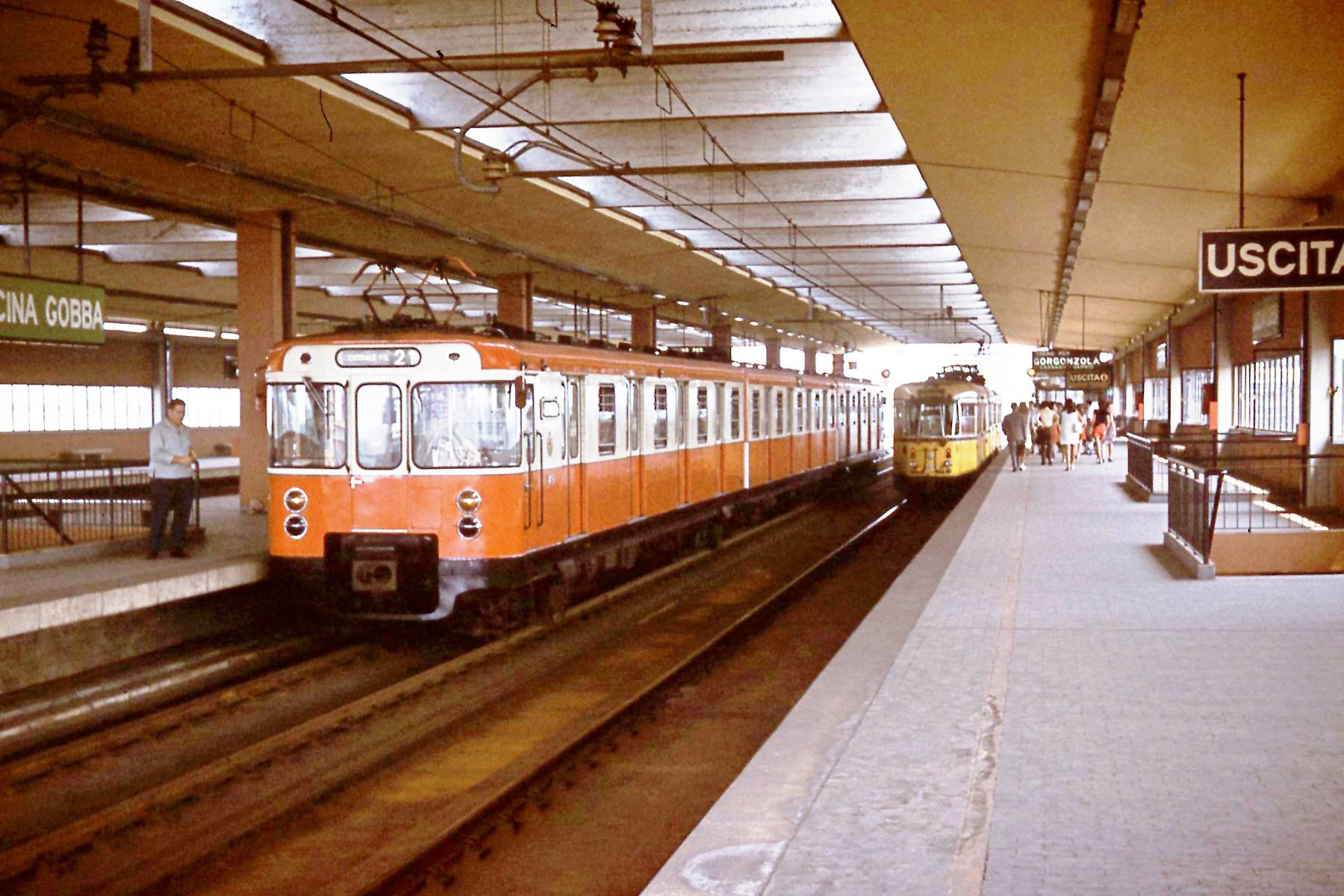

General information
- Location: Milan; Italy
- Coordinates: 45°30′40″N 9°15′38″E
- Owner: Azienda Trasporti Milanesi
- Platforms: 2 side platforms 1 island platform
- Tracks: 4
- Connections: ATM buses

Construction
- Structure type: Elevated
- Parking: Multi-storey car park with 1600 spaces
- Accessible: y

Other information
- Fare zone: STIBM: Mi1 and Mi3

History
- Opened: 5 May 1968; 58 years ago as tramway stop 27 September 1969; 56 years ago as metro station

Services
Preceding station	Milan Metro	Following station
Crescenzago towards Assago or Abbiategrasso	Line 2	Cologno Sud towards Cologno Nord
Crescenzago towards Assago or Abbiategrasso	Line 2	Vimodrone towards Gessate
Location

Cascina Gobba is a station on Line 2 of the Milan Metro. The station is located on Via Padova at the west side of the A51 Milan bypass road. This is beside the major highway interchange known as Cascina Gobba, which is the main vehicular transportation hub of northeast Milan, Italy. The line branches here to terminate at either Cologno Nord or Gessate.

The station takes its name from Cascina Gobba, a nearby rural village.

MeLA, a fully automated people mover opened in 1999, connects the station to the San Raffaele Hospital.

== History ==
The station was inaugurated in 1968 with the opening of the Linee celeri dell'Adda, served by interurban fast tram to Vaprio and Cassano d'Adda. The following year the station started to be part of the newly built Line 2 of the Milan Metro, between Cascina Gobba and Caiazzo, as an east terminus of the line. On 4 December 1972, tram service was replaced by rapid transit, and thus the line was extended to Gorgonzola.

The station became a junction on 7 June 1981 with the opening of the Cologno Monzese branch to Cologno Nord. Since 1999, the station is also the terminus of the MeLA people mover to San Raffaele Hospital.
