= Caiazzo (Milan Metro) =

Milan metro station

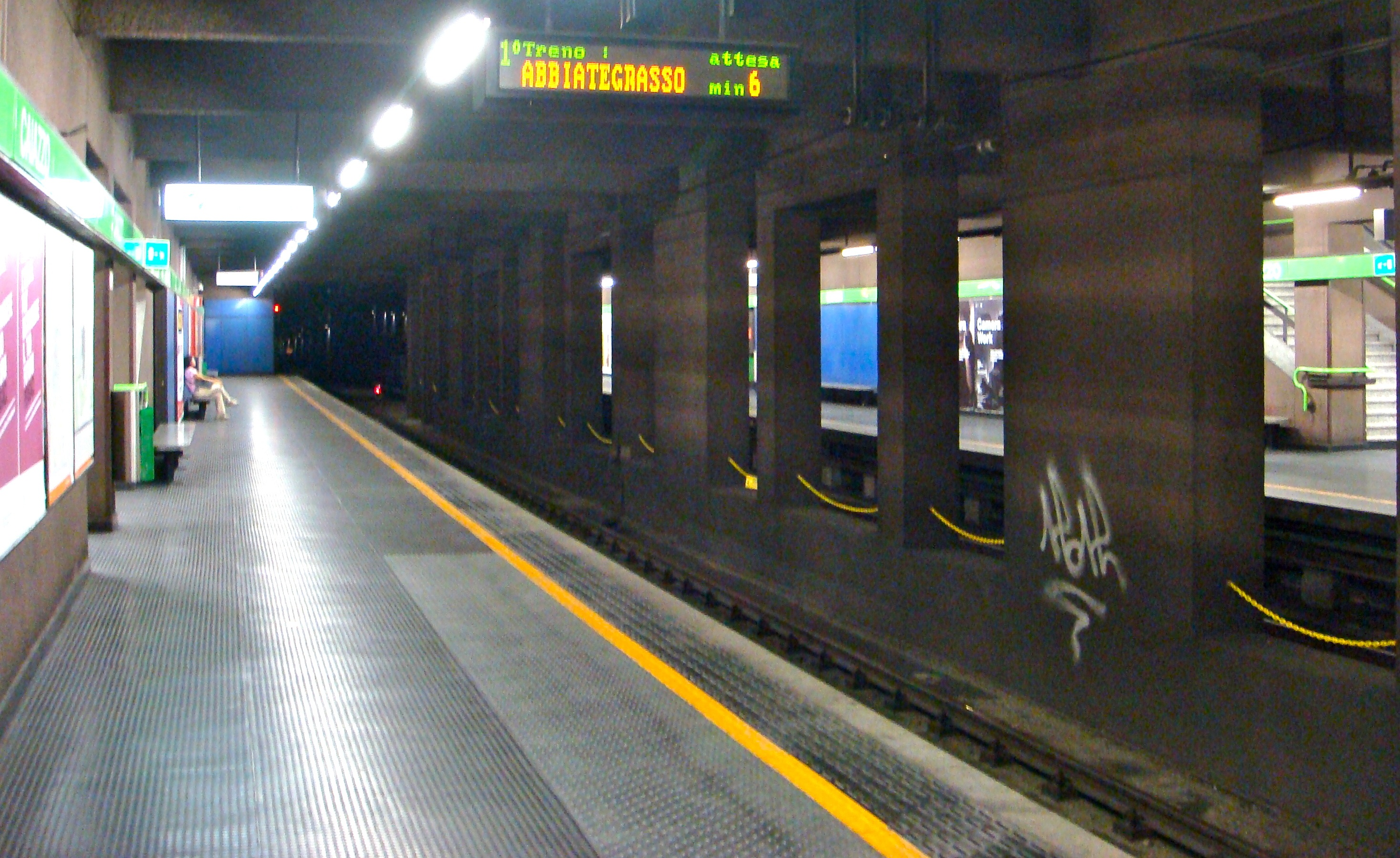

General information
- Location: Piazza Caiazzo, Milan; Italy
- Coordinates: 45°29′07″N 9°12′33″E
- Owner: Azienda Trasporti Milanesi
- Platforms: 2
- Tracks: 2

Construction
- Structure type: Underground

Other information
- Fare zone: STIBM: Mi1

History
- Opened: 27 September 1969; 56 years ago

Services
Preceding station	Milan Metro	Following station
Centrale towards Assago or Abbiategrasso	Line 2	Loreto towards Cologno Nord or Gessate
Location

Caiazzo is a station on Line 2 of the Milan Metro. It was opened on 27 September 1969 as part of the inaugural section of Line 2, between Cascina Gobba and Caiazzo. On 27 April 1970, the line was extended by one station to Centrale.

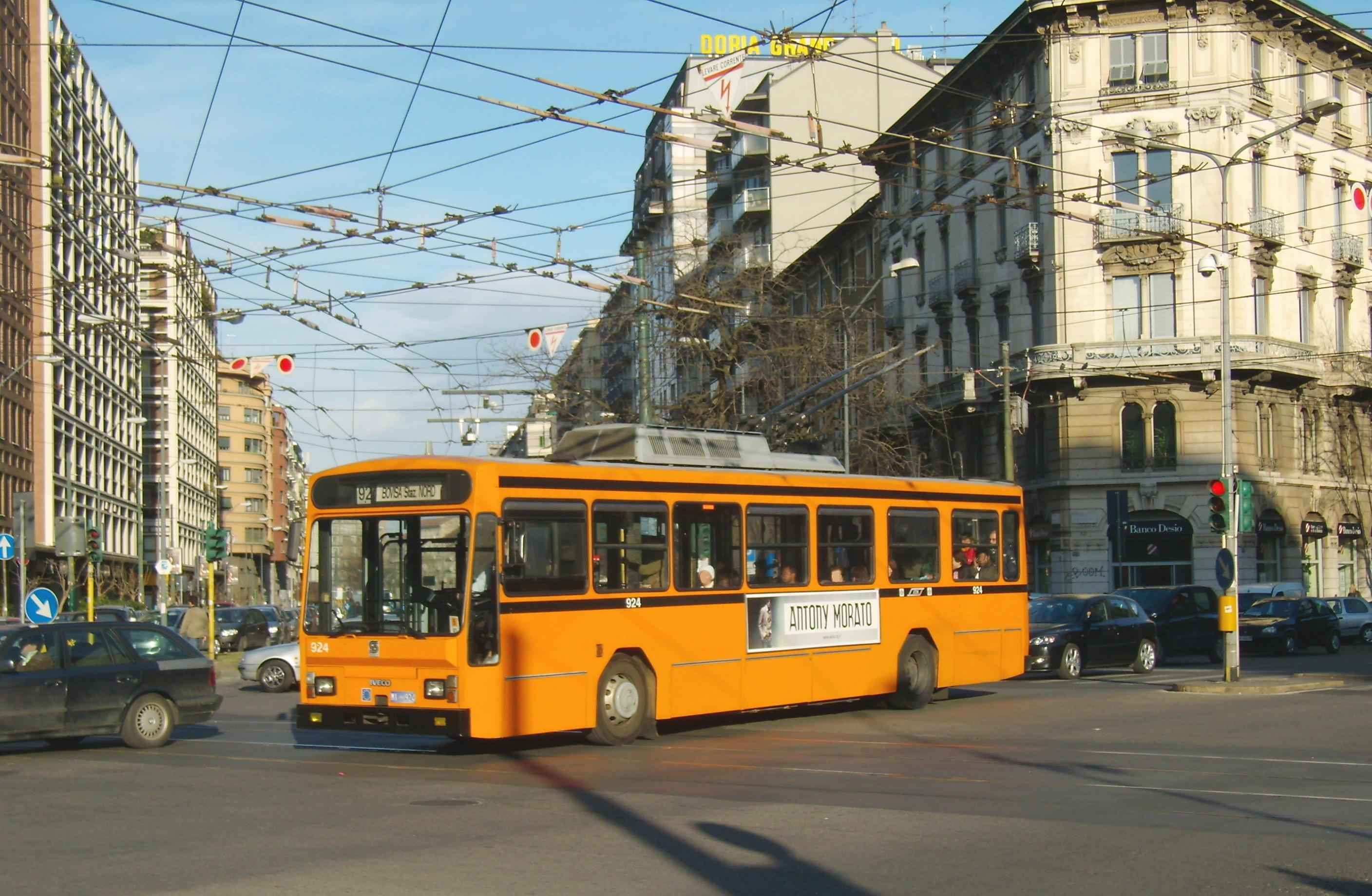
Trolleybus on route 92 in Piazza Caiazzo
