= Ronca =

Ronca may refer to:

- Armando Ronca, Italian architect
- Ronca (river), river in Corsica

== See also ==
- Roncà
- Ronco (disambiguation)
