= Ronco (disambiguation) =

Ronco is an American small appliances company.

Ronco may also refer to:

== Places ==
- Ronco, Pennsylvania, United States
- Ronco, a hamlet in Bedretto, Ticino, Switzerland
- Ronco, a hamlet in Quinto, Ticino, Switzerland
- Ronco, a frazione of the commune Corteno Golgi, Italy
- Ronco all'Adige, municipality in the Province of Verona in the Italian region Veneto
- Ronco Biellese, municipality in the Province of Biella in the Italian region Piedmont
- Ronco Briantino, municipality in the Province of Monza and Brianza in the Italian region Lombardy
- Ronco Canavese, municipality in the Metropolitan City of Turin in the Italian region Piedmont
- Ronco Scrivia, municipality in the Metropolitan City of Genoa in the Italian region Liguria
- Ronco sopra Ascona, municipality near Locarno in the canton of Ticino in Switzerland

== Other uses ==
- Ronco (genus), a genus of crustaceans in the family Pontogeneiidae
- RONCO Consulting, an American mine and unexploded ordnance clearance company
- Ronco, a river in Italy, part of Bidente-Ronco
- French brig Ronco (1808)
- Ronco, an American pasta brand owned by TreeHouse Foods
- Bidente-Ronco, a river in the Emilia-Romagna region of Italy

== See also ==
- Ronca (disambiguation)
