= San Siro =

Stadium in Milan, Italy

Coordinates: 45°28′41″N 9°07′26″E

- Stadio Giuseppe Meazza; La Scala del calcio
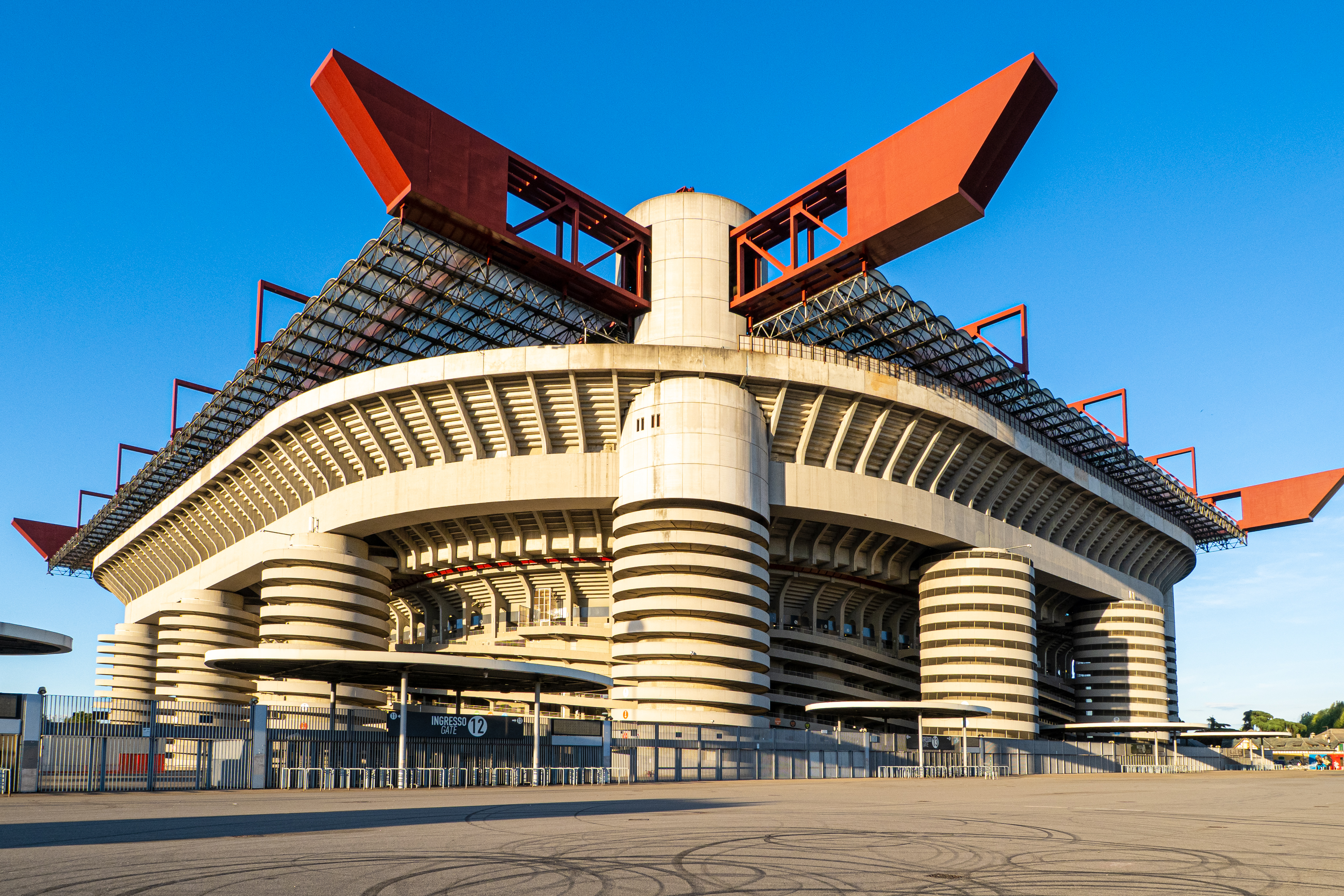
- UEFA
- Interactive map of San Siro
- Former names: Stadio Comunale di San Siro
- Address: Piazzale Angelo Moratti, 20151
- Location: Milan, Italy
- Owner: AC Milan (1926–1935); City of Milan (1935–2025); AC Milan & Inter Milan (2025–present)
- Operator: M-I Stadio s.r.l.
- Capacity: 75,817 (limited capacity); 80,018 (maximum)
- Executive suites: 30
- Type: Stadium
- Surface: GrassMaster hybrid grass
- Field size: 105 m × 68 m
- Public transit: San Siro Stadio; 16 San Siro Stadio; 49 San Siro Stadio

Construction
- Groundbreaking: December 1925; 100 years ago
- Opened: 19 September 1926; 100 years ago
- Renovated: 1935, 1955, 1987–1990, 2015–2016
- Architects: Cugini, Stacchini (1925); Perlasca, Bertera (1935); Ronca, Calzolari (1955); Ragazzi, Hoffer, Finzi (1990)

Tenants
- AC Milan (1926–1941, 1945–present); Inter Milan (1947–present); Italy national football team (selected matches)

The Stadio Giuseppe Meazza, commonly known as the San Siro, is a football stadium in the San Siro district of Milan, Italy. Nicknamed "La Scala del calcio" (Italian for 'La Scala of football'), it has a seating capacity of 75,817, making it the largest stadium in Italy and one of the largest stadiums in Europe. It is the home stadium of the city's principal professional football clubs, AC Milan and Inter Milan, who contest the Derby della Madonnina.

In March 1980, the stadium was named in honour of Giuseppe Meazza, the two-time World Cup winner (1934, 1938) who played for Inter (and briefly for other teams like Milan) in the 1920s, 1930s, and 1940s, and served two stints as Inter's manager.

The San Siro is a UEFA category four stadium. It hosted three games at the 1934 FIFA World Cup, the opening ceremony and six games at the 1990 FIFA World Cup, three games at the UEFA Euro 1980 and four European Cup finals, in 1965, 1970, 2001 and 2016. The stadium also hosted the opening ceremony of the 2026 Winter Olympics, held in both Milan and Cortina d'Ampezzo.

The stadium is expected to be demolished in 2031 or 2032 after a replacement stadium is built.

== History ==
An aerial view of San Siro

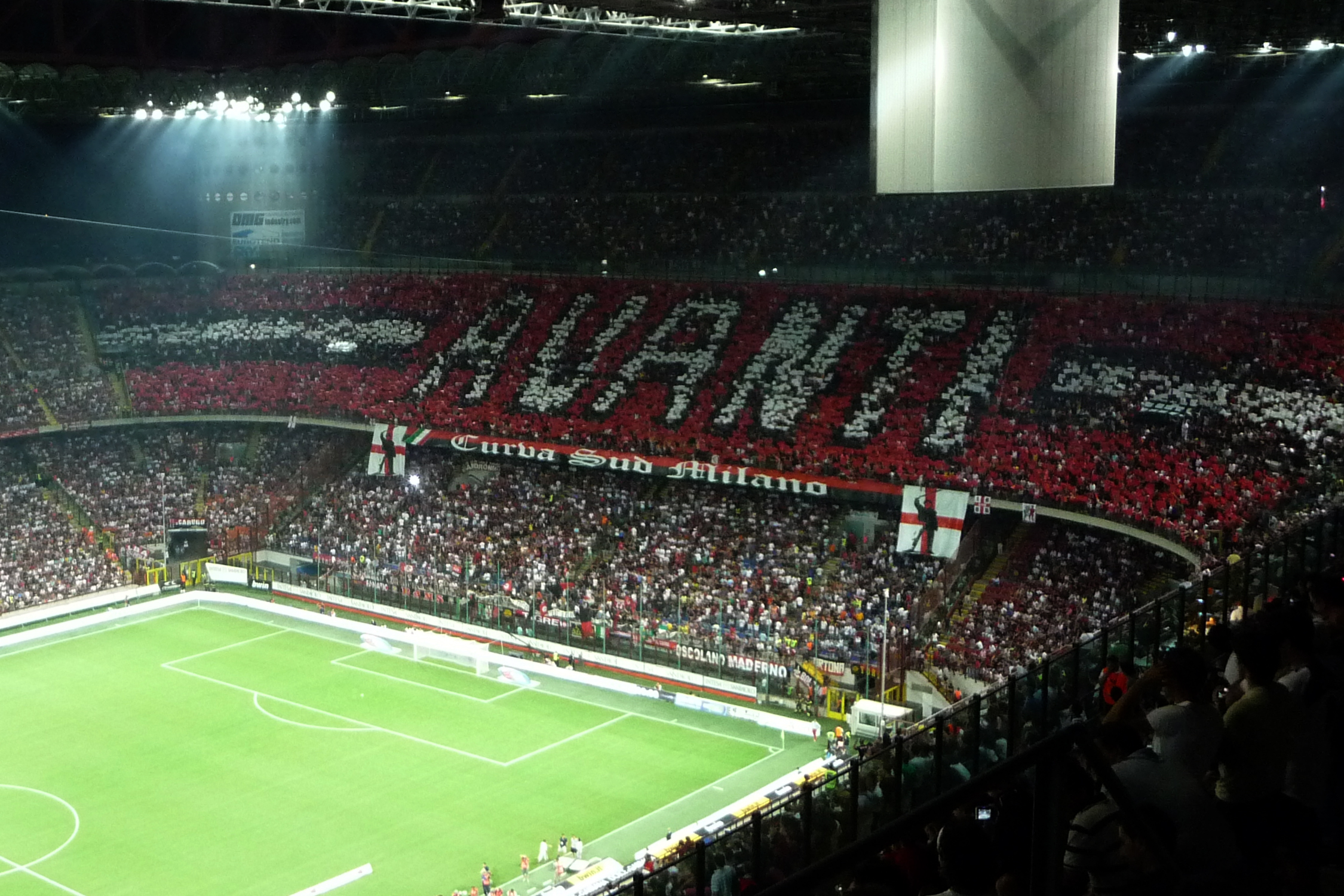
The choreography of AC Milan's fans during a Derby della Madonnina

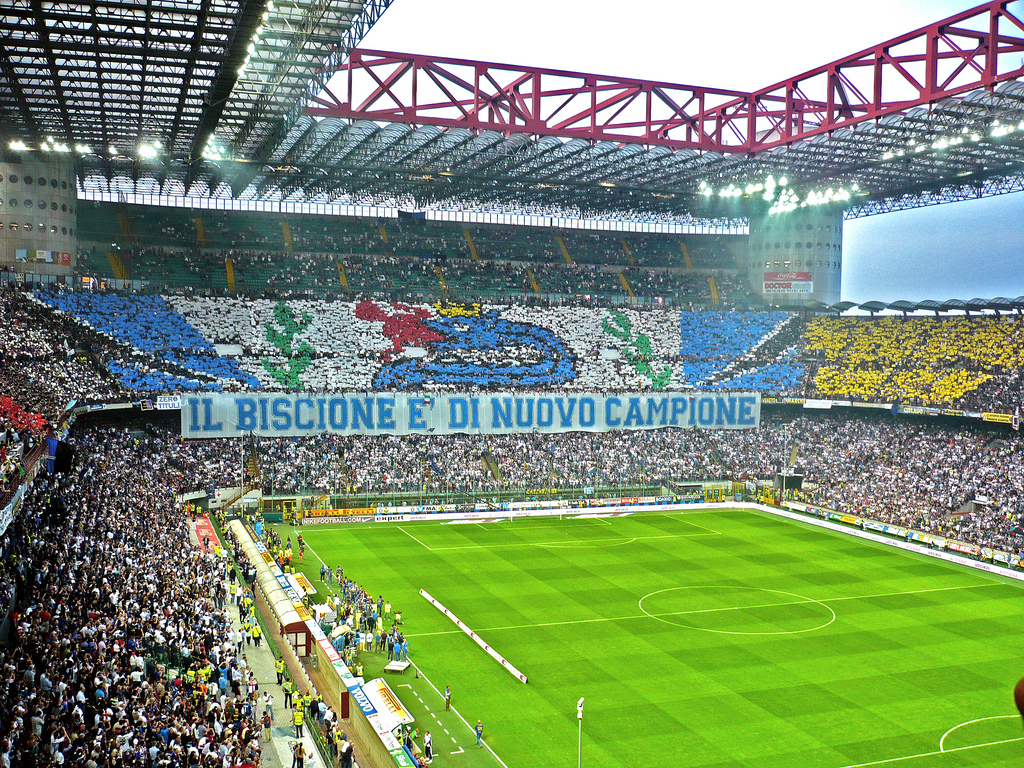
The choreography of Inter Milan's fans during a match against AC Siena in Serie A

Construction of the stadium commenced in 1925 in the San Siro district of Milan, with the new stadium originally named Nuovo Stadio Calcistico San Siro (San Siro New Football Stadium). The idea to build a stadium in the same district as the Ippodromo di San Siro (an adjacent horse racing track opened in 1920) belonged to the president of AC Milan at the time, Piero Pirelli. The architects designed a private stadium only for football, without the athletics tracks that characterised Italian stadiums built with public funds.

The design took inspiration from English football stadiums with four separated stands. The new stadium was inaugurated on 19 September 1926, when 35,000 spectators saw Inter defeat Milan 6–3. Originally, the ground was the home and property of Milan, then acquired by the City Council in the 1930s, where a capacity expansion of seats was developed connecting already-existing four stands in the corners. This historic setting was then called as the first tier. Finally, in 1947, Inter, who used to play in the Arena Civica downtown, became tenants and the two teams have shared the ground ever since.

From 1948 to 1955, engineers Armando Ronca and Ferruccio Calzolari developed the project for the second extension of the stadium, which was meant to increase the capacity from 50,000 to 150,000 visitors. Calzolari and Ronca proposed three additional, vertically arranged, rings of spectator rows. Nineteen spiralling ramps – each 200 metres long – gave access to the upper tiers, popularly called "the second ring". During construction, the realisation of the highest of the three tiers was abandoned and the number of visitors limited to 100,000. Then for security reasons, the capacity was reduced to 60,000 seats and 25,000 standing.

On 2 March 1980 the stadium was named for Giuseppe Meazza (1910–1979), one of the most famous Milanese footballers. For a time, Inter fans called the stadium Stadio Meazza due to Meazza's stronger connections with Inter (14 years as a player, three stints as manager). However, in recent years both Inter and Milan fans have called the stadium simply San Siro.

The last major renovation for the San Siro, which cost $60 million, took place between 1987 and 1990, for the 1990 FIFA World Cup. It was decided to modernise the stadium by increasing its capacity to 85,000 spectators and building a cover. The Municipality of Milan entrusted the work to the architects Giancarlo Ragazzi and Enrico Hoffer, and to the engineer Leo Finzi. To increase capacity, a third tier was built (only on three of the four sides, in the two curves and in the west grandstand) which rests on eleven support towers surrounded by helical ramps that allow access to the public. Four of these eleven concrete towers were located at the corners to additionally support a new roof, which has distinctive protruding red girders.

In 1996, a museum was opened inside the stadium charting the history of AC Milan and Internazionale, with historical shirts, cups and trophies, shoes, art objects and souvenirs of all kinds on display to visitors.

Three Milan derby Champions League knockout ties have taken place at the San Siro, in 2003, 2005 and 2023 with Milan winning the first of two ties with the latter being won by Inter Milan. Inter's fans reacted to impending defeat in the 2005 second leg by throwing flares and other objects at Milan players and forcing the match to be abandoned; this earned the club a large fine and a four-game ban on spectators attending European fixtures there the following season.

Apart from being used by Milan and Inter, the Italy national team occasionally plays matches there. It has also been used for the European Cup finals of 1965 (won by Inter), 1970 (won by Feyenoord), and the UEFA Champions League finals of 2001 (won by Bayern Munich) and 2016 (won by Real Madrid).

The stadium was also used for the home leg of three UEFA Cup finals in which Inter was competing (1991, 1994, 1997) when these were played over two legs. It was also used by Juventus for their 'home' leg in 1995 as they decided against playing their biggest matches at their own Stadio delle Alpi at the time. On each occasion, apart from 1991, the second leg was played at the San Siro and the winners lifted the trophy there. However, the stadium has not yet been selected as the host stadium since the competition changed to a single-match final format in 1997–98.

The San Siro has never hosted a final of the UEFA Cup Winners' Cup, but was the host stadium for the 1951 Latin Cup, a four-team event won by Milan. The city was also the venue for the 1956 edition of the Latin Cup (also won by Milan), but those matches were played at Arena Civica.

In March 2020, at the start of the COVID-19 pandemic in Italy, the Associated Press dubbed the UEFA Champions League match between Bergamo club Atalanta and Spanish club Valencia at the San Siro on 19 February as "Game Zero". This was the first time Atalanta had progressed to the Champions League round of 16, and the match was attended by over 40,000 people – about one third of Bergamo's population. By 24 March, almost 7,000 people in the province of Bergamo had tested positive for COVID-19, and more than 1,000 people had died from the virus—making Bergamo the most hard-hit province in all of Italy during the pandemic.

=== Replacement ===
In June 2019, Milan and Internazionale announced their intention to build a new stadium to replace the San Siro. The new 60,000 capacity stadium, which would be constructed next to the San Siro, was initially anticipated to cost US$800 million and be ready for the 2022–23 season, although this did not come to pass.

Giuseppe Sala, the current Mayor of Milan, and the comune of Milan asked for time, and stressed that the San Siro would be kept until at least the 2026 Winter Olympics and Winter Paralympics to be held in Milan and Cortina d'Ampezzo. The proposed project was also met with some skepticism and opposition by several fans of both teams.

In September 2019, Milan and Internazionale released two potential designs for the new stadium next to the original ground, tentatively named the Nuovo Stadio Milano, designed by Populous and MANICA, respectively. On 22 May 2020, Italy's heritage authority raised no objections to demolish the San Siro. On 21 December 2021, the Populous project was chosen. Despite the previous decision, given the historic relevance of architecture solutions in public buildings for the realization of the second ring in 1955, being the stadium owned by the City Council and according to the Italian law the Ministry of Cultural Heritage and Activities stated that the San Siro stadium could not be demolished after 70 years from its construction.

The City Council of Milan attempted to revert this decision in court appeal but failed to pursue the aim due to refusal of the appeal itself. The due date was set to be on 10 November 2025, after which the stadium would be constrained and the City Council must preserve the whole building. To comply with this rule, several projects were presented in parallel to refurbish and modernise the San Siro.

Aceti proposed the reconversion of the third ring through the replacement of the concrete stand with an iconic panoramic walk with restaurants, rooms and playgrounds. The JMA Architecture Studio proposed a complete removal of the third ring – the newest and not subject to public interest and relevance – with the realization of a new covering and VIP boxes between the two older stands, plus extra VIP seats closer to the pitch.

The third project was unveiled by Arco Associati & Giulio Fenyves with the complete preservation of the building but at the same time realizing VIP boxes between the first and second rings, being renamed as "the fourth ring". The project presented also the realization of a wide commercial and fanzone area surrounding the whole stadium with food & beverage shops, stores and commercial and corporate offices, also for both football clubs, thus constituting a sort of gate - or "foyer" to recall the theatre-inspired nickname of the stadium from La Scala theater.

In September 2023, Milan chairman Paolo Scaroni announced the club had filed a proposal to build a new 70,000-seater stadium, alongside the club headquarters and museum in the comune of San Donato Milanese, a suburb south of Milan, though this project was suspended. A pronunciation of the regional administrative court in September 2025 rejected the possibility to build a stadium in the aforementioned areas to AC Milan.

In September 2025, the Milan City Council discussed a proposal to sell the stadium and its surrounding area to AC Milan and Internazionale, with both clubs planning to build a replacement on the site. The new stadium is set to be a 71,500-seat facility as part of an associated mixed-use development, and will cost around €1.25 billion. The City Council claimed the unsustainable rise in management and facility costs for ordinary maintenance to motivate the selling, together with UEFA's decision to exclude the San Siro from potential venues to host international matches (such as the Champions League finals match or UEFA Euro 2032) due to requirements not being reached.

The proposal was approved by the House of City Council on 30 September 2025. Once the stadium is sold to private companies, the constraint for architectural relevance on the second ring will not be applicable, being privately owned and no longer held by a public entity. On 24 September 2025, both AC Milan and Internazionale announced an agreement with Foster and Partners and Manica for the realisation of the design for the new stadium.

In October 2025, a rendering of the new stadium was revealed. Unlike the San Siro, the new stadium is expected to be oval shaped, and lack the iconic red beams. The roof will be fixed and translucent, allowing for sunlight and climate control. AC Milan and Internazionale will continue to play in the San Siro until the new stadium is ready, after which a majority of the stadium will be demolished in 2031 or 2032, with part of it retained for a commercial and entertainment area, including a possible museum. Milan stated that the new stadium would be ready by 2030 at the earliest. In November 2025, AC Milan and Internazionale acquired both the stadium and the surrounding land for €197 million. Following the approval of a draft collaboration agreement between the Municipality of Milan and the Lombardy Region, construction on the new Milan stadium is set to begin in the second half of 2027. In October 2026, AC Milan and Internazionale unveiled plans for Generali Stadium, which would be located next to San Siro.

On 29 October 2026, AC Milan and Inter Milan unveiled the design for their new 71,500-seat stadium, to be called Generali Stadium, to be built on an adjacent parking lot while San Siro remains in use, with construction expected to begin in 2028 and the first match targeted for the 2031–32 season, after which San Siro is to be mostly demolished.

== International football matches ==
=== Italy national team ===
Date	Opponent	Score	Attendance	Competition
20 February 1927	Czechoslovakia	2–2	28,000	Friendly
2 December 1928	Netherlands	3–2	19,000	Friendly
1 December 1929	Portugal	6–1	25,000	Friendly
22 February 1931	Austria	2–1	45,000	1931–32 Central European International Cup
27 November 1932	Hungary	4–2	32,000	Friendly
25 March 1934	Greece	4–0	20,000	1934 FIFA World Cup qualification Group 3
3 June 1934	Austria	1–0	35,000	1934 FIFA World Cup Semi-final
9 December 1934	Hungary	4–2	45,000	Friendly
25 October 1936	Switzerland	4–2	40,000	1936–38 Central European International Cup
15 May 1938	Belgium	6–1	25,000	Friendly
13 May 1939	England	2–2	60,000	Friendly
5 May 1940	Germany	3–2	65,000	Friendly
19 April 1942	Spain	4–0	55,000	Friendly
1 December 1946	Austria	3–2	53,000	Friendly
6 May 1951	Yugoslavia	0–0	50,000	Friendly
24 January 1954	Egypt	5–1	40,000	1954 FIFA World Cup qualification Group 9
25 April 1956	Brazil	3–0	80,000	Friendly
22 December 1957	Portugal	3–0	50,000	1958 FIFA World Cup qualification Group 8
12 May 1963	Brazil	3–0	72,000	Friendly
18 June 1966	Austria	1–0	40,000	Friendly
1 November 1966	Soviet Union	1–0	55,000	Friendly
9 October 1971	Sweden	3–0	65,582	UEFA Euro 1972 qualifying Group 6
29 April 1972	Belgium	0–0	63,549	UEFA Euro 1972 quarter-finals
1 November 1973	Sweden	2–0	65,454	Friendly
5 June 1976	Romania	4–2	30,329	Friendly
24 February 1979	Netherlands	3–0	70,000	Friendly
15 March 1980	Uruguay	1–0	35,000	Friendly
12 June 1980	Spain	0–0	46,816	UEFA Euro 1980 Group B
13 November 1982	Czechoslovakia	2–2	72,386	UEFA Euro 1984 qualifying Group 5
26 September 1984	Sweden	1–0	25,000	Friendly
15 November 1986	Switzerland	3–2	67,422	UEFA Euro 1988 qualifying Group 2
5 December 1987	Portugal	3–0	13,524	UEFA Euro 1988 qualifying Group 2
17 November 1993	Portugal	1–0	71,513	1994 FIFA World Cup qualification Group 1
7 October 2000	Romania	3–0	54,297	2002 FIFA World Cup qualification Group 8
17 April 2002	Uruguay	1–1	16,767	Friendly
6 September 2003	Wales	4–0	68,000	UEFA Euro 2004 qualifying Group 7
26 March 2005	Scotland	2–0	40,745	2006 FIFA World Cup qualification Group 5
8 September 2007	France	0–0	81,200	UEFA Euro 2008 qualifying Group B
16 October 2012	Denmark	3–1	37,027	2014 FIFA World Cup qualification Group B
15 November 2013	Germany	1–1	40,000	Friendly
16 November 2014	Croatia	1–1	63,222	UEFA Euro 2016 qualifying Group H
15 November 2016	Germany	0–0	48,600	Friendly
13 November 2017	Sweden	0–0	72,696	2018 FIFA World Cup qualification Second round
17 November 2018	Portugal	0–0	73,000	2018–19 UEFA Nations League; Group A3
6 October 2021	Spain	1–2	33,524	2021 UEFA Nations League Finals; Nations League SF
23 September 2022	England	1–0	50,640	2022–23 UEFA Nations League A
12 September 2023	Ukraine	2–1	58,386	UEFA Euro 2024 qualifying Group C
17 November 2024	France	1–3	68,158	2024–25 UEFA Nations League A
20 March 2025	Germany	1–2	60,334	2024–25 UEFA Nations League A
16 November 2025	Norway	1–4	69,020	2026 FIFA World Cup qualification Group I
12 November 2026	France	3–1	71,452	2026–27 UEFA Nations League A

=== 1934 FIFA World Cup ===
The stadium was one of the biggest venues of the 1934 FIFA World Cup and held three matches.

Date	Team 1	Result	Team 2	Round
27 May 1934	Switzerland	3–2	Netherlands	Round of 16
31 May 1934	Germany	2–1	Sweden	Quarter-finals
3 June 1934	Italy	1–0	Austria	Semi-finals

=== UEFA Euro 1980 ===
The stadium was one of the four selected to host the matches during UEFA Euro 1980.

Date	Team 1	Result	Team 2	Round
12 June 1980	Spain	0–0	Italy	Group B
15 June 1980	Belgium	2–1	Spain	Group B
17 June 1980	Netherlands	1–1	Czechoslovakia	Group A

=== 1990 FIFA World Cup ===
The stadium was one of the venues of the 1990 FIFA World Cup and held six matches.

Date	Team 1	Result	Team 2	Round
8 June 1990	Argentina	0–1	Cameroon	Group B (opening match)
10 June 1990	West Germany	4–1	Yugoslavia	Group D
15 June 1990	West Germany	5–1	United Arab Emirates	Group D
19 June 1990	West Germany	1–1	Colombia	Group D
24 June 1990	West Germany	2–1	Netherlands	Round of 16
1 July 1990	Czechoslovakia	0–1	West Germany	Quarter-finals

=== 2021 UEFA Nations League Finals ===
The stadium was one of two selected to host the 2021 UEFA Nations League Finals matches.

Date	Team 1	Result	Team 2	Round
6 October 2021	Italy	1–2	Spain	Semi-finals (opening match)
10 October 2021	Spain	1–2	France	Final

== Other sports ==
=== 2026 Winter Olympics ===
San Siro hosted the opening ceremony of the 2026 Winter Olympics.

=== Boxing ===
San Siro was the venue for the boxing match between Duilio Loi vs. Carlos Ortiz for the Junior Welterweight title in 1960.

=== Rugby union ===
The first rugby union international game at Meazza Stadium was a 1987-89 FIRA European Championship match between Italy and Romania (which won the match 12–3), attended by a crowd of approx. 7,000. In November 2009, the venue hosted a test match between Italy and New Zealand. Without the limitation to approx. 75,000 imposed for security reasons by the Home Office to association football events, 80,018 tickets were sold, which was one of the highest attendances for the venue and more generally the highest at all for a rugby union event in Italy. The All Blacks won 20–6.

Year	Date	Match	Country	Score	Country	Attendance
1988	2 April	FIRA Trophy	Italy	3–12	Romania	7,000
2009	14 November	Test match	Italy	6–20	New Zealand	80,018

== Concerts ==
Since the 1980s, the stadium has hosted concerts by several major international artists. The first ever to perform there was Bob Marley on 27 June 1980, during the Uprising Tour. It hosted Bob Dylan and Santana in 1984, Bruce Springsteen in 1985, Genesis, Duran Duran and David Bowie in 1987, Michael Jackson in 1997, the Red Hot Chili Peppers in 2004, and U2 in 2005 and 2009.

The Rolling Stones played at the stadium in 2006 and 2022, Madonna in 2009 and 2012, Depeche Mode in 2009, 2013, 2017 and 2023, Muse in 2010, 2019, and 2023, Bon Jovi in 2013, One Direction in 2014, Pearl Jam in 2014, Beyoncé in 2016, Coldplay in 2017 and 2023, Ed Sheeran in 2019, and Elton John in 2022 and Taylor Swift in 2024. Italian singer-songwriter Elisa performed at the stadium in 2025.

Edoardo Bennato was the first Italian artist to perform and sell out the stadium in July 1980. In 2007, Laura Pausini became the first female artist to perform at the stadium and held two consecutive concerts on 4 and 5 June 2016.

Vasco Rossi holds the record for largest number of performances on the stadium, with twenty-nine concerts between 1990 and 2019, followed by Luciano Ligabue with thirteen concerts. Vasco Rossi also holds the record for consecutive concerts, with six shows between 1 and 12 June 2019.

The international musician with the most performances at San Siro is Bruce Springsteen, with eight concerts as of 2025.

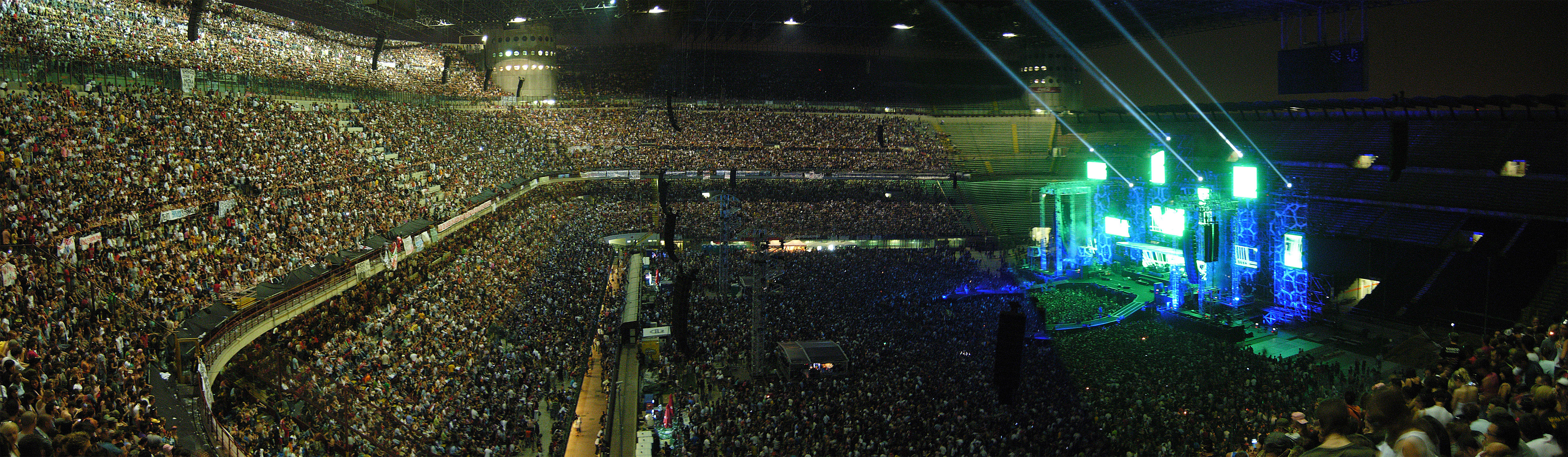
A Vasco Rossi concert in 2007

Date	Performer(s)	Opening act(s)	Tour/Event	Attendance	Notes
27 June 1980	Bob Marley & The Wailers	Pino Daniele	Uprising Tour		
15 July 1980	Various artists		La Carovana del Mediterraneo		
19 July 1980	Edoardo Bennato		Sono Solo Canzonette		
29 June 1984	Bob Dylan	Santana; Pino Daniele	Bob Dylan 1984 European Tour		
21 June 1985	Bruce Springsteen		Born in the U.S.A. Tour	65,000	
13 July 1986	Various artists		Milano Suono Festival 1986		
16 July 1986	Various artists		Milano Suono Festival 1986		
17 July 1986	Various artists		Milano Suono Festival 1986		
18 July 1986	Various artists		Milano Suono Festival 1986		
19 July 1986	Various artists		Milano Suono Festival 1986		
20 June 1986	Various artists		Milano Suono Festival 1986		
15 May 1987	Genesis	Paul Young	Invisible Touch Tour		
5 June 1987	Duran Duran		Strange Behaviour Tour		
10 June 1987	David Bowie		Glass Spider Tour	70,000	
10 July 1990	Vasco Rossi	Ladri di Biciclette; Casino Royale	Fronte del Palco Tour 1990		
28 May 1992	Antonello Venditti		Alta marea Tour		
4 July 1994	Al Bano; Romina Power				
7 July 1995	Vasco Rossi		Rock Sotto Assedio		
8 July 1995	Vasco Rossi		Rock Sotto Assedio		
15 June 1996	Vasco Rossi		Nessun Pericolo Per Te Tour		
18 June 1997	Michael Jackson	B-Nario; Paola e Chiara	HIStory World Tour	65,000	
28 June 1997	Ligabue	Gang; Negrita	Il Bar Mario è Aperto		
29 June 1997	Ligabue	Gang; Negrita	Il Bar Mario è Aperto		
22 May 1998	Eros Ramazzotti		Eros World Tour		
9 July 1998	Claudio Baglioni		Da me a te		
5 July 2002	Ligabue		Fuori Come Va Tour		
6 July 2002	Ligabue		Fuori Come Va Tour		
10 June 2003	The Rolling Stones	The Cranberries	Licks Tour		
28 June 2003	Bruce Springsteen		The Rising Tour		
1 July 2003	Claudio Baglioni		Tutto in un abbraccio		
4 July 2003	Vasco Rossi	Articolo 31	Vasco @ S.Siro 03		
5 July 2003	Vasco Rossi	Irene Grandi	Vasco @ S.Siro 03		
8 July 2003	Vasco Rossi	Anouk	Vasco @ S.Siro 03		
29 May 2004	Renato Zero		Cattura il sogno		
8 June 2004	Red Hot Chili Peppers	The Roots	Roll on the Red Tour		
12 June 2004	Vasco Rossi	Simone Tomassini	Buoni o Cattivi Tour 2004		
13 June 2004	Vasco Rossi		Buoni o Cattivi Tour 2004		
20 July 2005	U2	Ash; Feeder	Vertigo Tour	137,427	Parts of the concerts were filmed and recorded for the group's live album and concert film U2.COMmunication and Vertigo 05: Live from Milan respectively.
21 July 2005	U2	Ash; Feeder	Vertigo Tour	137,427	Parts of the concerts were filmed and recorded for the group's live album and concert film U2.COMmunication and Vertigo 05: Live from Milan respectively.
27 May 2006	Ligabue		Nome e Cognome Tour		
11 July 2006	The Rolling Stones	Bo Diddley; Feeder	A Bigger Bang	56,175	
22 July 2006	Robbie Williams		Close Encounters Tour		
2 June 2007	Laura Pausini		Io Canto Tour		
9 June 2007	Renato Zero		MpZero		
21 June 2007	Vasco Rossi		Vasco Live 2007		
22 June 2007	Vasco Rossi		Vasco Live 2007		
30 June 2007	Biagio Antonacci	Nomadi	Vicky Love Tour		
31 May 2008	Negramaro		La Finestra Tour		
6 June 2008	Vasco Rossi		Il Mondo Che Vorrei Live Tour 2008		
7 June 2008	Vasco Rossi		Il Mondo Che Vorrei Live Tour 2008		
14 June 2008	Zucchero		All the Best		
25 June 2008	Bruce Springsteen		Magic Tour	59,821	
4 July 2008	Ligabue		Elle-Elle Live 2008		
5 July 2008	Ligabue		Elle-Elle Live 2008		
18 June 2009	Depeche Mode	Dolcenera; M83	Tour of the Universe	57,544	The concert was recorded for the group's live album project Recording the Universe.
21 June 2009	Various artists		Amiche per l'Abruzzo		
7 July 2009	U2	Snow Patrol	U2 360° Tour	153,806	
8 July 2009	U2	Snow Patrol	U2 360° Tour	153,806	The performances of Breathe and Electrical Storm were recorded for the group's live album From the Ground Up: Edge's Picks from U2360°.
14 July 2009	Madonna		Sticky & Sweet Tour	55,338	
8 June 2010	Muse	Calibro 35; Friendly Fires; Kasabian	The Resistance Tour	60,000	
16 July 2010	Ligabue	Margot	Arrivederci Mostro		
17 July 2010	Ligabue		Arrivederci Mostro		
16 June 2011	Vasco Rossi		Vasco Live Kom '011		
17 June 2011	Vasco Rossi		Vasco Live Kom '011		
21 June 2011	Vasco Rossi		Vasco Live Kom '011		
22 June 2011	Vasco Rossi		Vasco Live Kom '011		
12 July 2011	Take That	Pet Shop Boys	Progress Live		
7 June 2012	Bruce Springsteen		Wrecking Ball World Tour	57,149	
14 June 2012	Madonna	Martin Solveig	The MDNA Tour	53,244	
3 June 2013	Bruce Springsteen		Wrecking Ball World Tour	56,670	
19 June 2013	Jovanotti		Backup Tour		
20 June 2013	Jovanotti		Backup Tour		
29 June 2013	Bon Jovi		Because We Can	51,531	
13 July 2013	Negramaro		Una storia semplice Tour 2013	41,137	Elisa appeared as a special guest.
18 July 2013	Depeche Mode	Motel Connection; CHVRCHΞS	The Delta Machine Tour	57,919	
31 July 2013	Robbie Williams	Olly Murs	Take The Crown Stadium Tour		
31 May 2014	Biagio Antonacci		Palco Antonacci 2014		
6 June 2014	Ligabue		Mondovisione Tour: Stadi 2014		
7 June 2014	Ligabue		Mondovisione Tour: Stadi 2014		
20 June 2014	Pearl Jam		Lightning Bolt Tour		
28 June 2014	One Direction	5 Seconds of Summer	Where We Are Tour	115,931	The concerts were recorded for the group's concert film One Direction: Where We Are - The Concert Film.
29 June 2014	One Direction	5 Seconds of Summer	Where We Are Tour	115,931	The concerts were recorded for the group's concert film One Direction: Where We Are - The Concert Film.
4 July 2014	Vasco Rossi		Vasco Live Kom '014		
5 July 2014	Vasco Rossi		Vasco Live Kom '014		
9 July 2014	Vasco Rossi		Vasco Live Kom '014		
10 July 2014	Vasco Rossi		Vasco Live Kom '014		
19 July 2014	Modà		Stadi Tour 2014		
17 June 2015	Vasco Rossi		Vasco Live Kom '015		
18 June 2015	Vasco Rossi		Vasco Live Kom '015		
25 June 2015	Jovanotti		Lorenzo Negli Stadi 2015		
26 June 2015	Jovanotti		Lorenzo Negli Stadi 2015		
27 June 2015	Jovanotti		Lorenzo Negli Stadi 2015		
4 July 2015	Tiziano Ferro		Lo stadio Tour 2015		
5 July 2015	Tiziano Ferro		Lo stadio Tour 2015		
4 June 2016	Laura Pausini		Simili Tour	100,388	
5 June 2016	Laura Pausini		Simili Tour	100,388	
10 June 2016	Pooh		L'ultima notte insieme		
11 June 2016	Pooh		L'ultima notte insieme		
18 June 2016	Modà		Passione Maledetta Tour 2016		
19 June 2016	Modà		Passione Maledetta Tour 2016		
3 July 2016	Bruce Springsteen		The River Tour 2016	104,646	
5 July 2016	Bruce Springsteen		The River Tour 2016	104,646	
13 July 2016	Rihanna	Big Sean; DJ Mustard	Anti World Tour		
18 July 2016	Beyoncé	Chloe x Halle; Sophie Beem	The Formation World Tour	54,313	
9 June 2017	Davide Van De Sfroos				
16 June 2017	Tiziano Ferro		Il Mestiere della Vita Tour		
17 June 2017	Tiziano Ferro		Il Mestiere della Vita Tour		
19 June 2017	Tiziano Ferro		Il Mestiere della Vita Tour		
27 June 2017	Depeche Mode	Algiers	Global Spirit Tour	54,488	
3 July 2017	Coldplay	Lyves, Tove Lo	A Head Full of Dreams Tour	117,307	
4 July 2017	Coldplay	Tove Lo	A Head Full of Dreams Tour	117,307	
1 June 2018	J-Ax & Fedez		La Finale	79,500	
20 June 2018	Cesare Cremonini		Cremonini Stadi 2018	56,963	
27 June 2018	Negramaro		Amore Che Torni Tour Stadi 2018		
6 July 2018	Beyoncé; Jay-Z		On the Run II Tour	49,051	
1 June 2019	Vasco Rossi		Vasco Non Stop Tour 2019		
2 June 2019	Vasco Rossi		Vasco Non Stop Tour 2019		
6 June 2019	Vasco Rossi		Vasco Non Stop Tour 2019		
7 June 2019	Vasco Rossi		Vasco Non Stop Tour 2019		
11 June 2019	Vasco Rossi		Vasco Non Stop Tour 2019		
12 June 2019	Vasco Rossi		Vasco Non Stop Tour 2019		
19 June 2019	Ed Sheeran		÷ Tour	54,892	
28 June 2019	Luciano Ligabue		Start Tour		
4 July 2019	Laura Pausini e Biagio Antonacci		Laura Biagio Stadi Tour 2019		
5 July 2019	Laura Pausini e Biagio Antonacci		Laura Biagio Stadi Tour 2019		
12 July 2019	Muse	Mini Mansions, The Amazons	Simulation Theory World Tour	89,619	
13 July 2019	Muse	Mini Mansions, Nic Cester	Simulation Theory World Tour	89,619	
4 June 2022	Elton John		Farewell Yellow Brick Road	48,885	
21 June 2022	The Rolling Stones	Ghost Hounds	Sixty	57,204	
6 July 2022	Salmo		Flop Tour 2022		
10 July 2022	Guns N' Roses	Gary Clark Jr.	We're F'N' Back! Tour	53,623	
15 July 2022	Max Pezzali		SanSiro canta Max		
16 July 2022	Max Pezzali		SanSiro canta Max		
15 June 2023	Tiziano Ferro		Il mondo è nostro Tour		
17 June 2023	Tiziano Ferro		Il mondo è nostro Tour		
18 June 2023	Tiziano Ferro		Il mondo è nostro Tour		
25 June 2023	Coldplay	CHVRCHΞS; Mara Sattei	Music of the Spheres World Tour	249,560	
26 June 2023	Coldplay	CHVRCHΞS; Mara Sattei	Music of the Spheres World Tour	249,560	
28 June 2023	Coldplay	CHVRCHΞS; Mara Sattei	Music of the Spheres World Tour	249,560	
29 June 2023	Coldplay	CHVRCHΞS; Mara Sattei	Music of the Spheres World Tour	249,560	
5 July 2023	Ligabue		Stadi 2023		
6 July 2023	Pooh		Amici per sempre live 2023		
8 July 2023	Marco Mengoni		Marco in the stadiums 2023	54,000	
11 July 2023	Pinguini Tattici Nucleari				
12 July 2023	Pinguini Tattici Nucleari				
14 July 2023	Depeche Mode		Memento Mori World Tour	54,948	
17 July 2023	Ultimo		Ultimo Stadi 2023 - La favola continua...		
18 July 2023	Ultimo		Ultimo Stadi 2023 - La favola continua...		
20 July 2023	Blanco		Innamorato stadi		
22 July 2023	Muse	Royal Blood	Will of the People World Tour		
24 July 2023	Måneskin		Loud Kids Tour Gets Louder		
25 July 2023	Måneskin		Loud Kids Tour Gets Louder		
7 June 2024	Vasco Rossi		Vasco Live 2024	315,714 / 398,955	
8 June 2024	Vasco Rossi		Vasco Live 2024	315,714 / 398,955	
11 June 2024	Vasco Rossi		Vasco Live 2024	315,714 / 398,955	
12 June 2024	Vasco Rossi		Vasco Live 2024	315,714 / 398,955	
15 June 2024	Vasco Rossi		Vasco Live 2024	315,714 / 398,955	
19 June 2024	Vasco Rossi		Vasco Live 2024	315,714 / 398,955	
20 June 2024	Vasco Rossi		Vasco Live 2024	315,714 / 398,955	
22 June 2024	Negramaro		Da sud a nord: Stadi 2024	30,000	
24 June 2024	Sfera Ebbasta				
25 June 2024	Sfera Ebbasta				
28 June 2024	Club Dogo				
30 June 2024	Max Pezzali		Max Forever Hits Only		
1 July 2024	Max Pezzali		Max Forever Hits Only		
2 July 2024	Max Pezzali		Max Forever Hits Only		
4 July 2024	Zucchero		Overdose d'amore World Tour	45,000	
13 July 2024	Taylor Swift	Paramore	The Eras Tour	130,000	
14 July 2024	Taylor Swift	Paramore	The Eras Tour	130,000	
18 June 2025	Elisa	okgiorgio		54,000	Parts of the concert were filmed and recorded by Mediaset.
3 July 2025	Bruce Springsteen		The Land of Hope and Dreams Tour	52,000	
14 July 2026	Bruno Mars	DJ Pee .Wee; Victoria Monét	The Romantic Tour		
15 July 2026	Bruno Mars	DJ Pee .Wee; Victoria Monét	The Romantic Tour		
24 July 2026	The Weeknd	Playboi Carti	After Hours til Dawn Tour		
25 July 2026	The Weeknd	Playboi Carti	After Hours til Dawn Tour		
26 July 2026	The Weeknd	Playboi Carti	After Hours til Dawn Tour		
12 June 2027	Annalisa		Annalisa: San Siro 2027		
24 July 2027	Karol G		Viajando Por El Mundo Tropitour		
31 July 2027	Stray Kids		RUN IT World Tour		

== Transport connections ==
The stadium is located in the northwestern part of Milan. It can be reached by underground via the dedicated San Siro subway station (at the end of line M5), located just in front of the stadium, or by tram, with line 16 ending right in front of the building. The Lotto subway station (line M1 and line M5) is about 15 minutes walk away from San Siro.

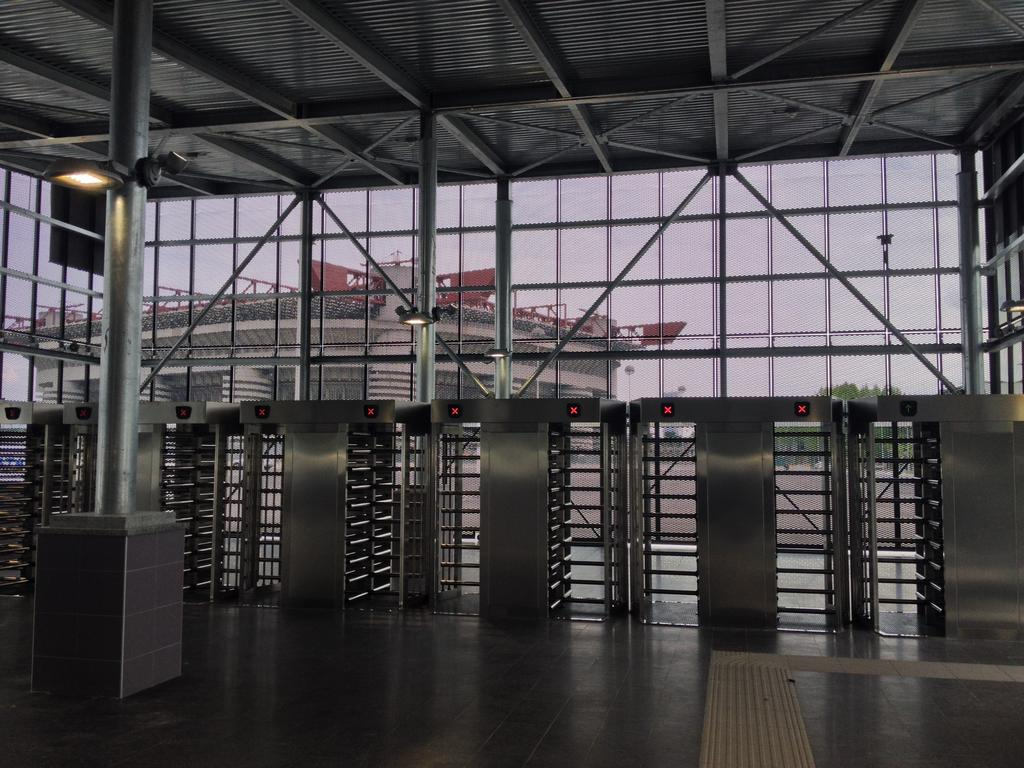
Metro station San Siro Stadio

Stations nearby:

Service	Station	Line
Milan Metro	San Siro Stadio	
Milan Metro	San Siro Ippodromo	
Milan Metro	Lotto	
Tram	Piazza Axum (Stadio)	16

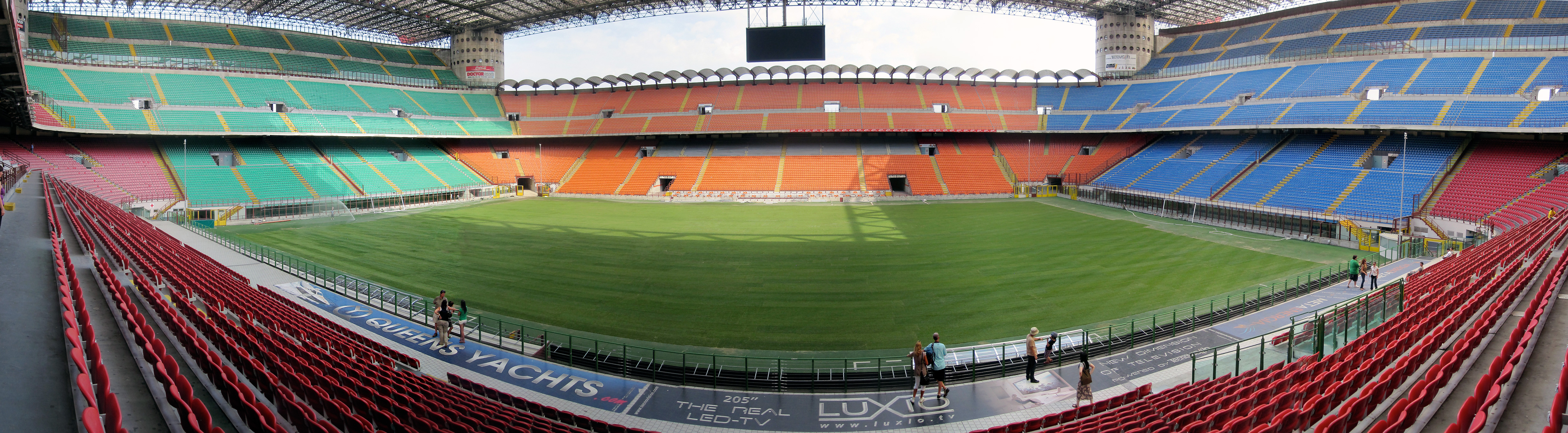
A panorama of the stadium

== Average attendances ==
Tenants	Serie A season	Home games	Average attendance
AC Milan	2023-24	19	72,008
Inter Milan	2023-24	19	72,838
AC Milan	2022-23	19	71,828
Inter Milan	2022-23	19	72,630

== See also ==
- Lists of stadiums

Preceded by Praterstadion; Vienna	European Cup; Final venue 1965	Succeeded by Heysel Stadium; Brussels
Preceded by Santiago Bernabéu; Madrid	European Cup; Final venue 1970	Succeeded by Wembley Stadium; London
Preceded by Estadio Azteca; Mexico City	FIFA World Cup; Opening venue 1990	Succeeded by Soldier Field; Chicago
Preceded by Stade de France; Saint-Denis	UEFA Champions League; Final venue 2001	Succeeded by Hampden Park; Glasgow
Preceded by Olympiastadion; Berlin	UEFA Champions League; Final venue 2016	Succeeded by Millennium Stadium; Cardiff
Preceded by Estádio do Dragão; Estádio D. Afonso Henriques	UEFA Nations League; Finals venue 2021 with Juventus Stadium	Succeeded by De Kuip; De Grolsch Veste
Preceded by Beijing National Stadium; Beijing	Winter Olympic Games; Opening ceremony (Olympic Stadium); 2026	Succeeded by TBA
