= Armando Ronca =

Italian architect

Armando Ronca (13 September 1901 – 19 March 1970) was an Italian architect who has executed numerous buildings and interior designs, mainly in South Tyrol, Trentino and Milan.

== Life ==
Armando Ronca studied engineering in Genoa, Turin and Padua. In the mid-1930s, Ronca moved to South Tyrol, and influenced significantly the architecture of Bolzano and Merano until well into the 1960s.

== Selected projects ==
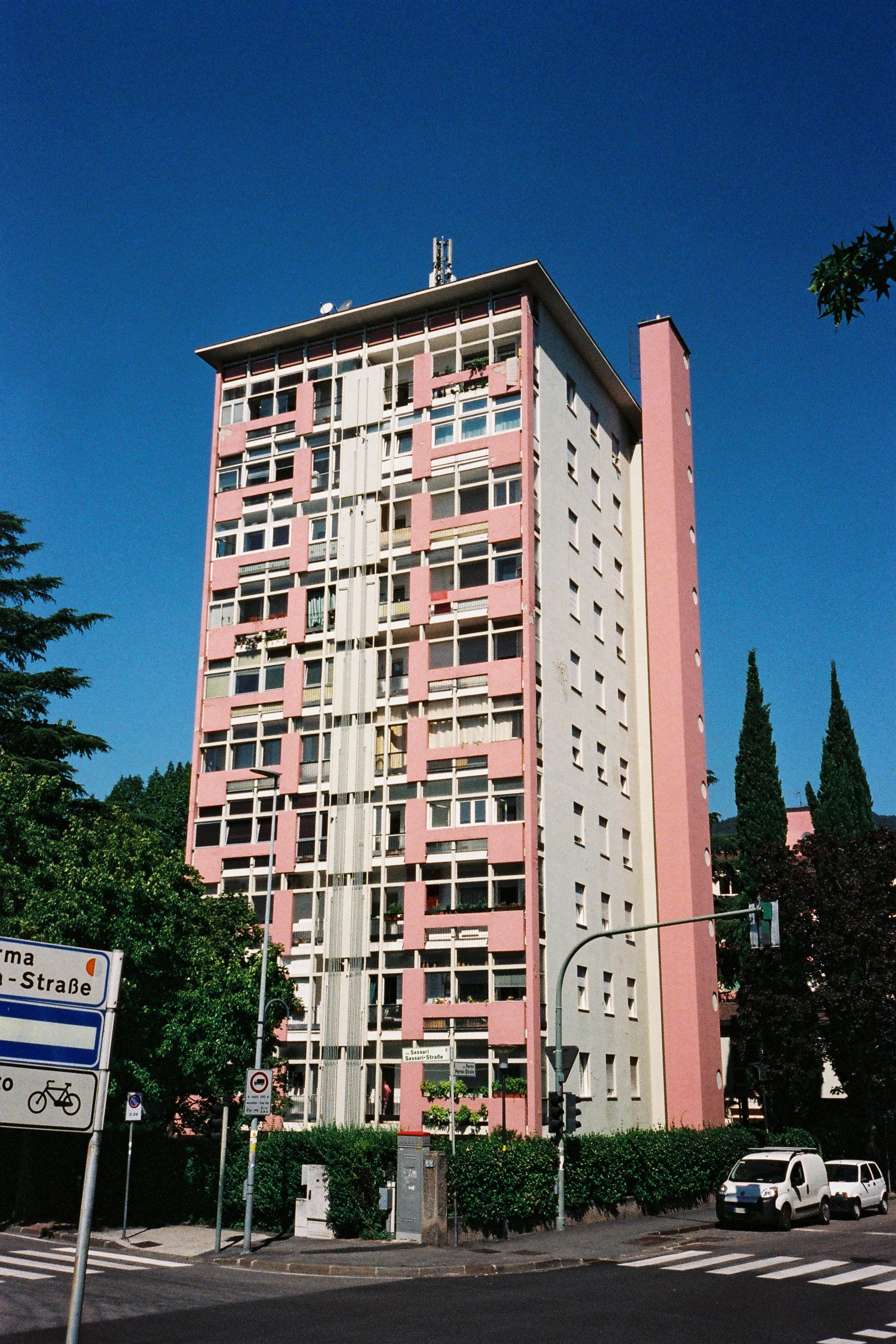
Armando Ronca: Residential tower of the INA-Casa residential complex (1964), Bolzano

- 1935: Villa Cembran, Merano
- 1938–40: Palazzo del Turismo (Cinema Corso), Bolzano (demolished 1988)
- 1952: Rainerum Institute, Bolzano
- 1955: Extension of the "San Siro" football stadium, Milan
- 1959: Eurotel hotel complex, Merano
- 1964: INA-Casa residential complex, Bolzano
- 1970: Pius X church, Bolzano

== Exhibitions ==
- 2017: Armando Ronca, Architektur der Moderne in Südtirol, 1935–1970, Kunst Meran / Merano Arte, Merano

== Bibliography ==
- Flavio Schimenti. Armando Ronca. Memorie di Architettura a Bolzano e in Alto Adige, 1929–1969, Praxis 3, Bolzano 1999
- Kunst Meran, Andreas Kofler, Magdalene Schmidt, Jörg Stabenow (eds). Armando Ronca: Architektur der Moderne in Südtirol, 1935–1970, Zürich 2017
- Roman Hollenstein: "Mailand in den Alpen". In Neue Zürcher Zeitung, November 21, 2017, p. 36.
