= Tourism in Milan =

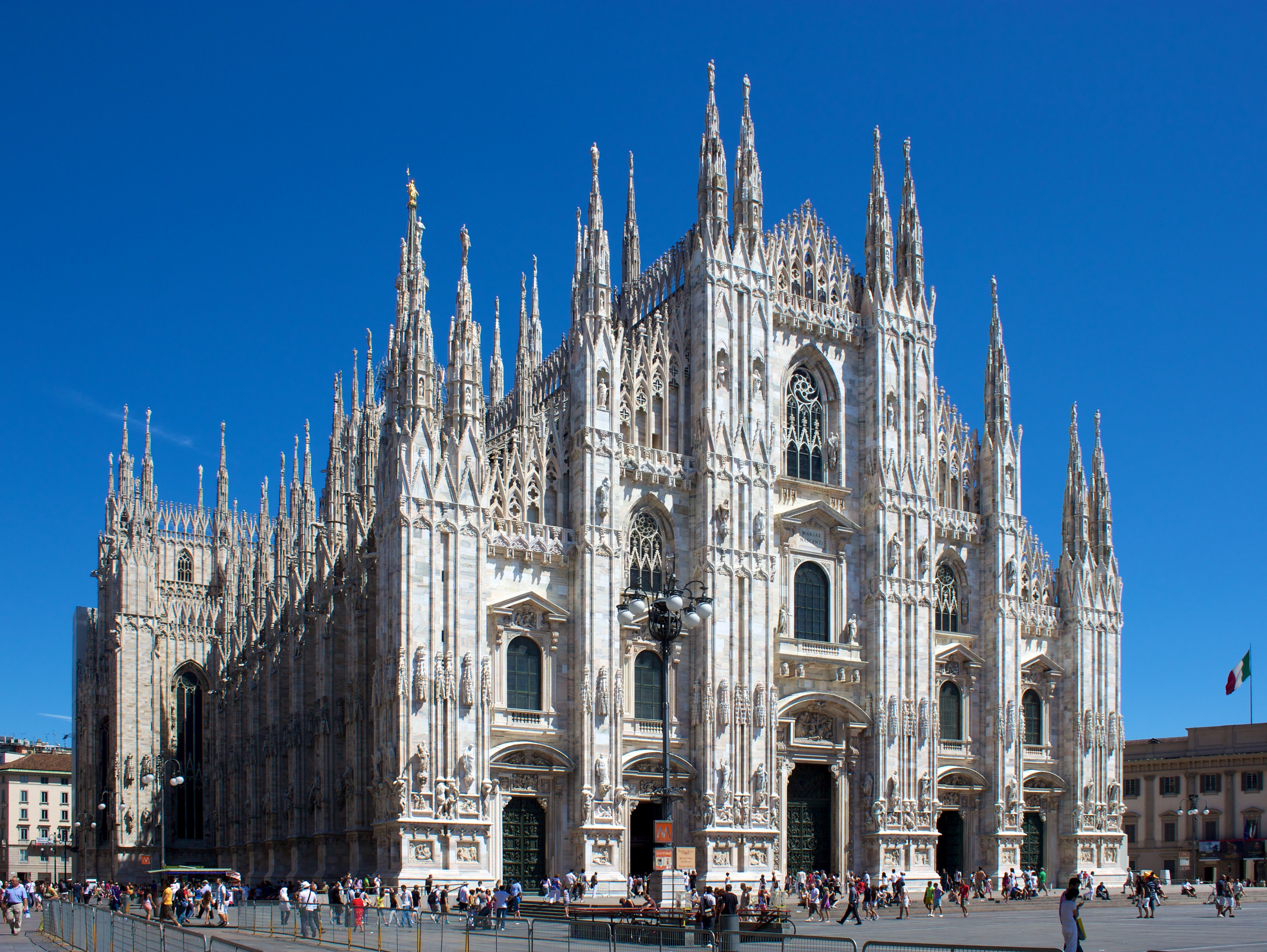
Milan Cathedral, the largest church in the Italian Republic and third largest in the world, is the city's most popular tourist destination

The Italian city of Milan is one of the international tourism destinations, appearing among the forty most visited cities in the world, ranking second in Italy after Rome, fifth in Europe and sixteenth in the world. One source has 56% of international visitors to Milan are from Europe, 44% of the city's tourists are Italian, and 56% are from abroad. The most important European Union markets are the United Kingdom (16%), Germany (9%) and France (6%). Most of the visitors who come from the United States to the city go on business matters, while Chinese and Japanese tourists mainly take up the leisure segment.

The city boasts several popular tourist attractions, such as the Milan Cathedral and Piazza del Duomo, the Teatro alla Scala, the San Siro Stadium, the Galleria Vittorio Emanuele II, the Castello Sforzesco, the Pinacoteca di Brera, the Via Montenapoleone, the Basilica di Sant'Ambrogio, the Navigli and the Brera district. The Milan Cathedral is the city's most popular tourist destination. Milan has a plethora of museums, ranging from science and industry to antiquities and art.

The city also has numerous hotels, including the ultra-luxurious Town House Galleria, which is the world's first seven-star hotel according to Société Générale de Surveillance (five-star superior luxury according to state law, however) and one of The Leading Hotels of the World. The average stay for a tourist in the city is of 3.43 nights, whilst foreigners stay for longer periods of time, 77% of which stay for a 2-5 night average. Milan is one of the key transport nodes of Italy and southern Europe. Its central railway station is Italy's second, after Rome Termini railway station, and Europe's eighth busiest. The Malpensa, Linate and Orio al Serio airports serve the Greater Milan, the largest metropolitan area in Italy.

== Tourism and statistics ==
1920 travel poster made by ENIT

Milan is one of the international tourism destinations, appearing among the forty most visited cities in the world, ranking second in Italy after Rome, fifth in Europe and sixteenth in the world. One source has 56% of international visitors to Milan are from Europe, 44% of the city's tourists are Italian, and 56% are from abroad. The most important European Union markets are the United Kingdom (16%), Germany (9%) and France (6%).

Most of the visitors who come from the United States to the city go on business matters, while Chinese and Japanese tourists mainly take up the leisure segment. Results from the same study also say that 60% of tourists who visit Milan are male, while 40% are female. Over 58% of visitors travel by air, and 26% by car.

Visitors to Milan appreciate it for different reasons; for example, 65% of visitors say that public transport is efficient, while 35% say that it is expensive and inadequate. Usually, tourists find that Milan has good entertainment and cultural opportunities (i.e. shopping, cuisine, music, nightlife and the arts) and that leisure activities are organized well and to a professional level.

Overall, the average tourist visiting Milan is satisfied by the city; over 63% say it was as they expected, 80% would want to return and 74% would advise a friend to go. They also find that taxis are efficient and easy to find and that communication (i.e. advertising events and attractions) is good. However, many say that there is not enough green space, that the city is very expensive and that the average level of English, as of 2009, is not very high.

The number of international tourists has been steadily increasing, and as of 2015 there were around 3.21 million international arrivals.

== History of Milan ==
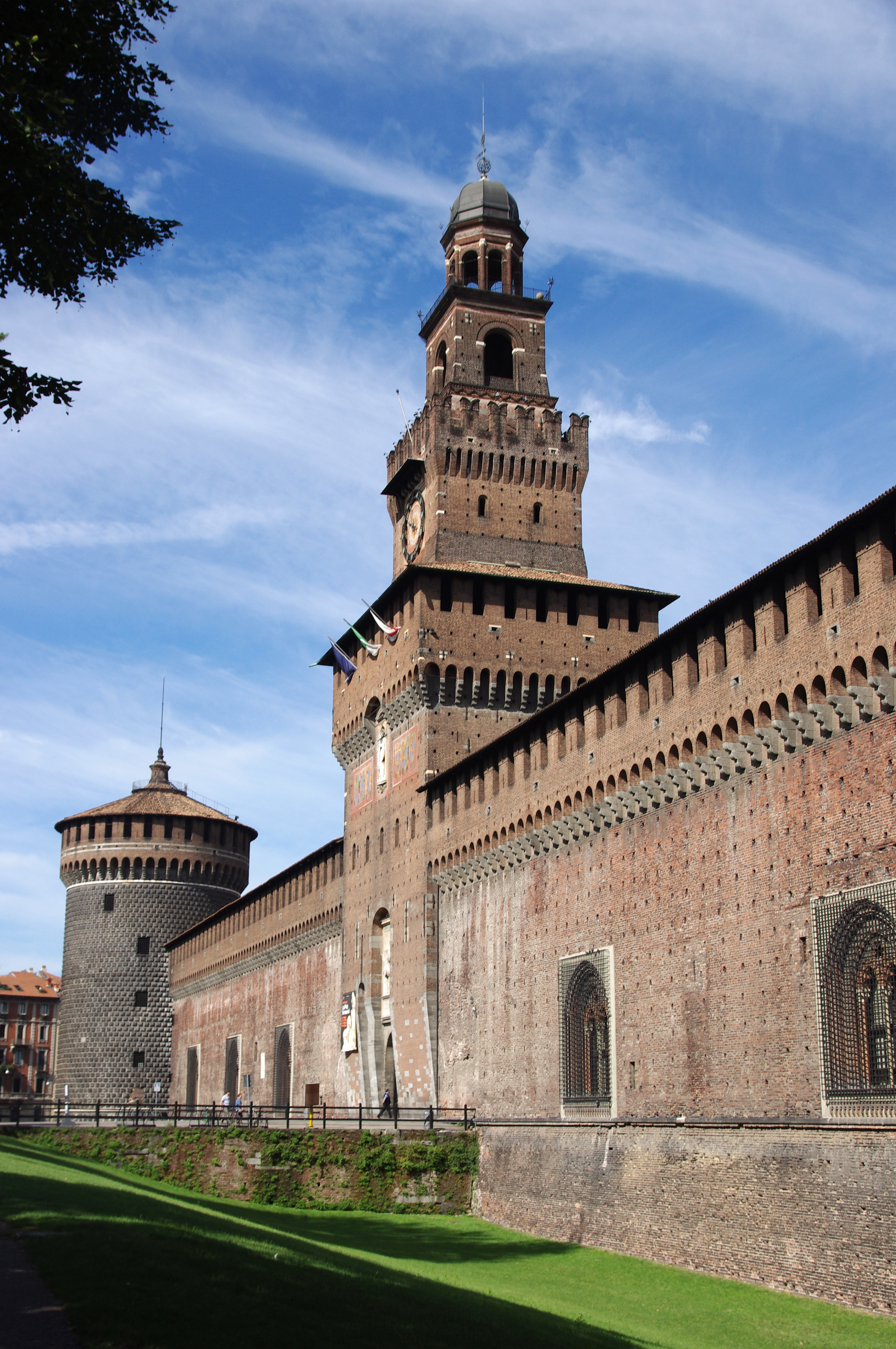
Torre del Filarete of Sforza Castle (Castello Sforzesco), a historic medieval fortress

Founded around 590 BC under the name Medhelanon by a Celtic tribe belonging to the Insubres group and belonging to the Golasecca culture, it was conquered by the ancient Romans in 222 BC, who Latinized the name of the city into Mediolanum. The city's role as a major political centre dates back to the late antiquity, when it served as the capital of the Western Roman Empire. During late antiquity, the Edict of Milan was promulgated, which granted freedom of worship to all Roman citizens, therefore also to Christians.

From the 12th century until the 16th century, Milan was one of the largest European cities and a major trade and commercial centre; consequently, it became the capital of the Duchy of Milan, one of the greatest political, artistic and fashion forces in the Renaissance. Having become one of the main centres of the Italian Enlightenment during the early modern period, the city subsequently became the industrial and financial capital of modern Italy. Capital of the Napoleonic Kingdom of Italy, after the Restoration it was among the most active centres of the Risorgimento, until its entry into the unified Kingdom of Italy.

With the unification of the country, Milan became the dominant commercial center of northern Italy. In 1919 Benito Mussolini rallied the Blackshirts for the first time in Milan, and later they began their March on Rome from Milan. During World War II Milan was extensively damaged by Allied bombings. Upon the surrender of Italy in 1943 German forces occupied northern Italy until the end of the war in 1945. Members of the Italian resistance in Milan took control of the city and executed Mussolini, his mistress, and other leaders of his Fascist government by hanging in Piazzale Loreto, Milan.

Since the end of World War II, Italy experienced an economic boom. From 1951 until 1967 the population of Milan grew from 1.3 million to 1.7 million. The city was reconstructed, but in the late 1960s and early 1970s, the city suffered from a huge wave of street violence, labor strikes and political terrorism during so called Years of Lead. During the 1980s, Milan became one of the world's fashion capitals. The rise of financial services and the service economy during the late 20th century further strengthened Milan's position as the Italian economic capital. The city's renewal in the 21st century was marked, among others, by hosting of the World Expo 2015 or big redevelopment projects such as Porta Nuova district or CityLife district.

== Most popular tourist attractions ==
The architectural and artistic presence in Milan represents one of the attractions of the Lombard capital. Milan has been among the most important Italian centres in the history of architecture, has made important contributions to the development of art history, and has been the cradle of a number of modern art movements.

The city boasts several popular tourist attractions, such as the Milan Cathedral and Piazza del Duomo, the Teatro alla Scala, the San Siro Stadium, the Galleria Vittorio Emanuele II, the Castello Sforzesco, La Scala, the Royal Villa of Milan, the Pinacoteca di Brera, the Via Montenapoleone, the Basilica di Sant'Ambrogio, the Navigli, the Brera district, the Royal Palace of Milan, the Chiaravalle Abbey, the Porta Sempione, the Basilica of San Lorenzo, the Basilica of Sant'Eustorgio, the Bosco Verticale, the Santa Maria delle Grazie, the Cimitero Monumentale di Milano, CityLife district, the Colonne di San Lorenzo, Corso Buenos Aires, Palazzo Marino, Palazzo Mezzanotte, Palazzo Lombardia, Piazza Mercanti, Piazza Cordusio, Piazza Gae Aulenti, the Piccolo Teatro, Porta Nuova district, the Quadrilatero della moda, the Teatro degli Arcimboldi, Via Dante, Corso Como and Via Monte Napoleone. The Milan Cathedral is the city's most popular tourist destination.

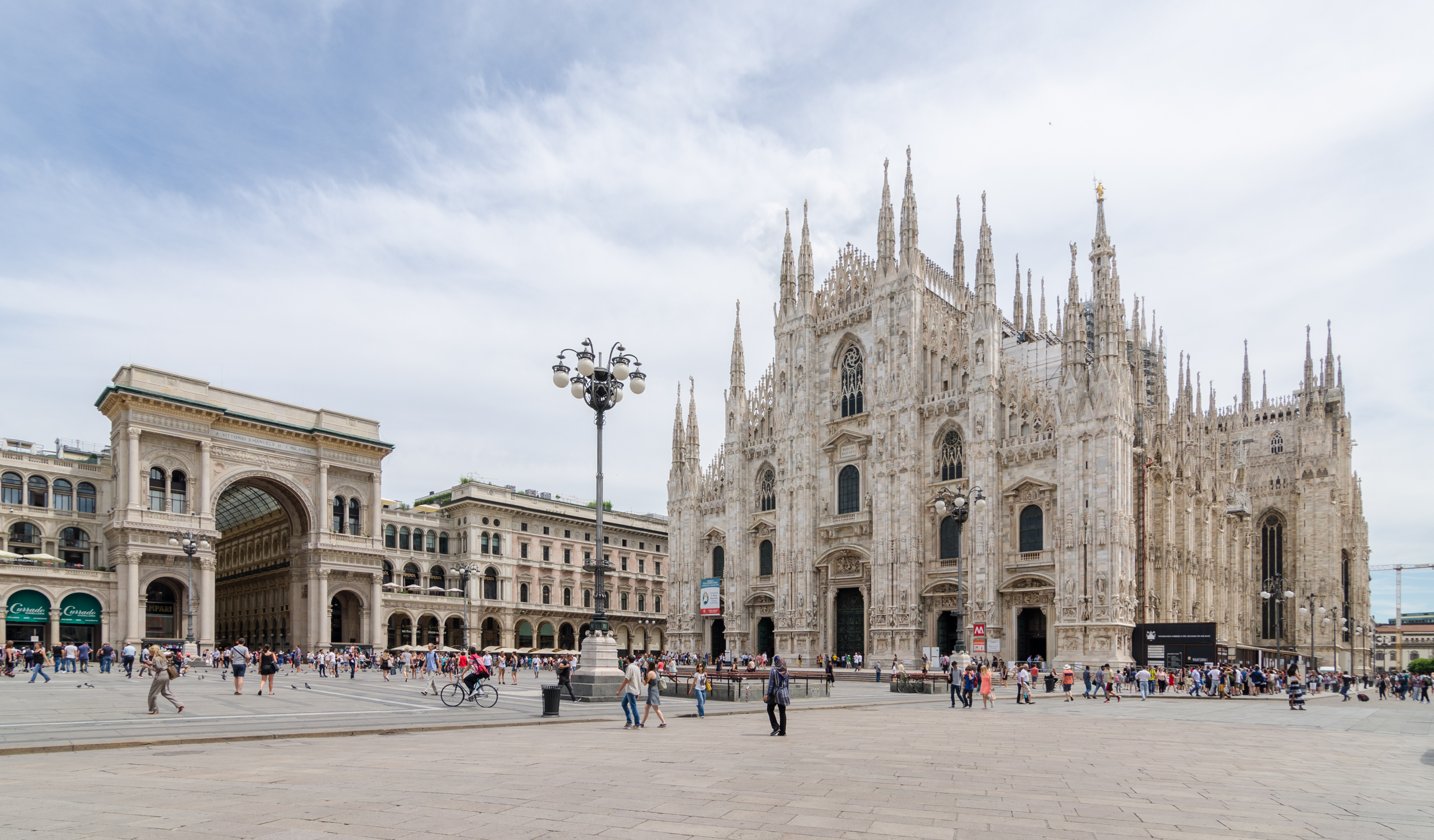
Piazza del Duomo

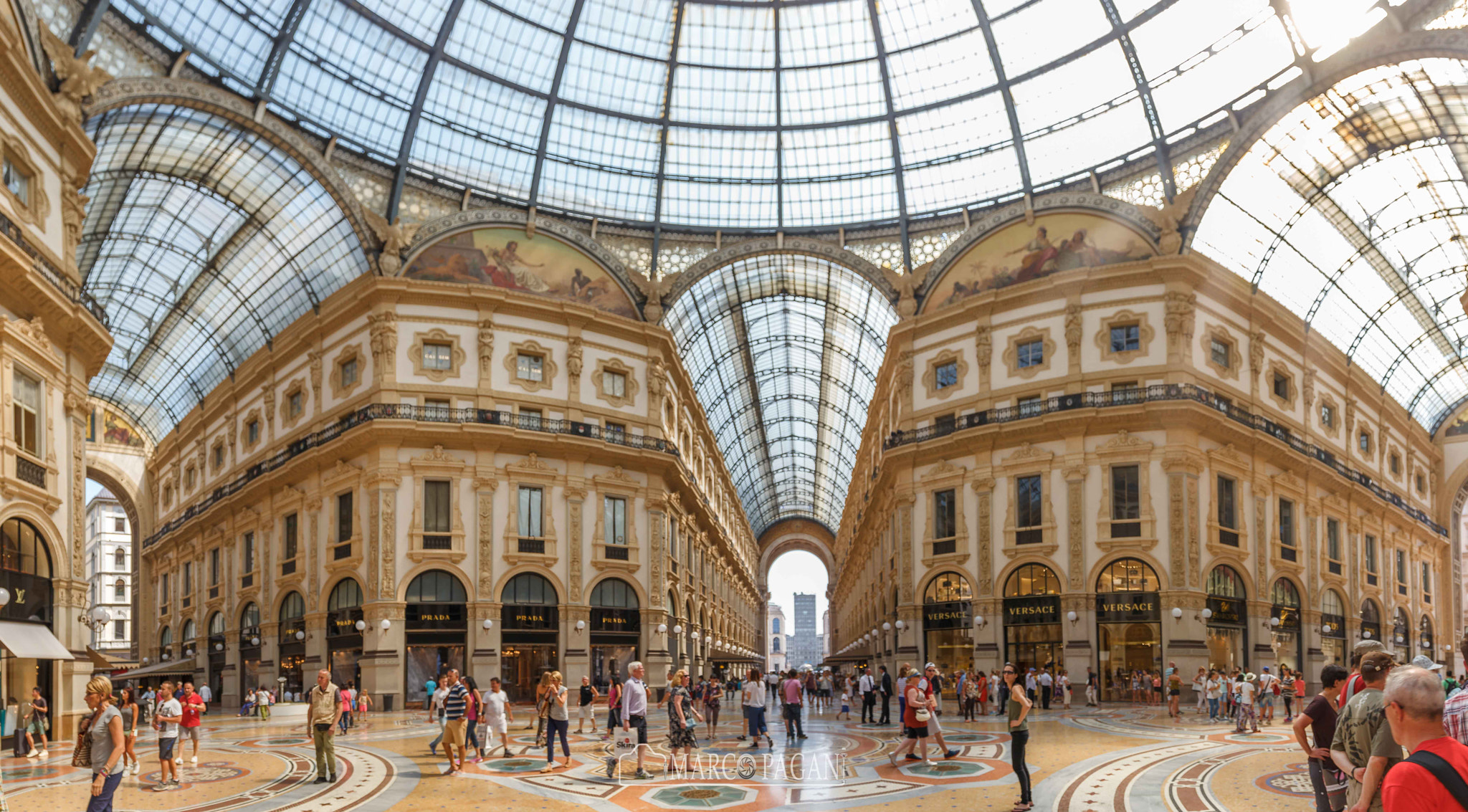
Galleria Vittorio Emanuele II

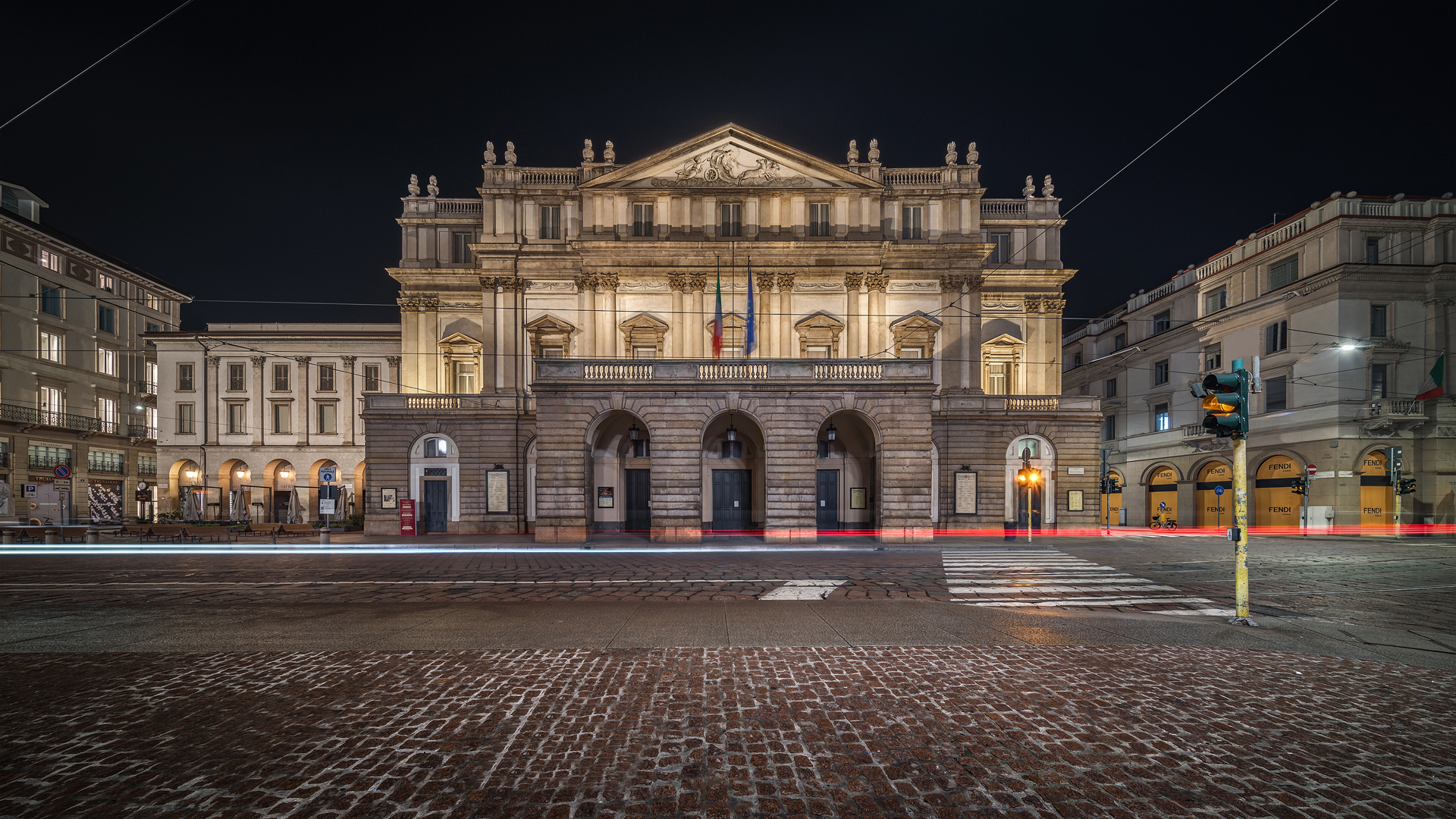
La Scala theatre

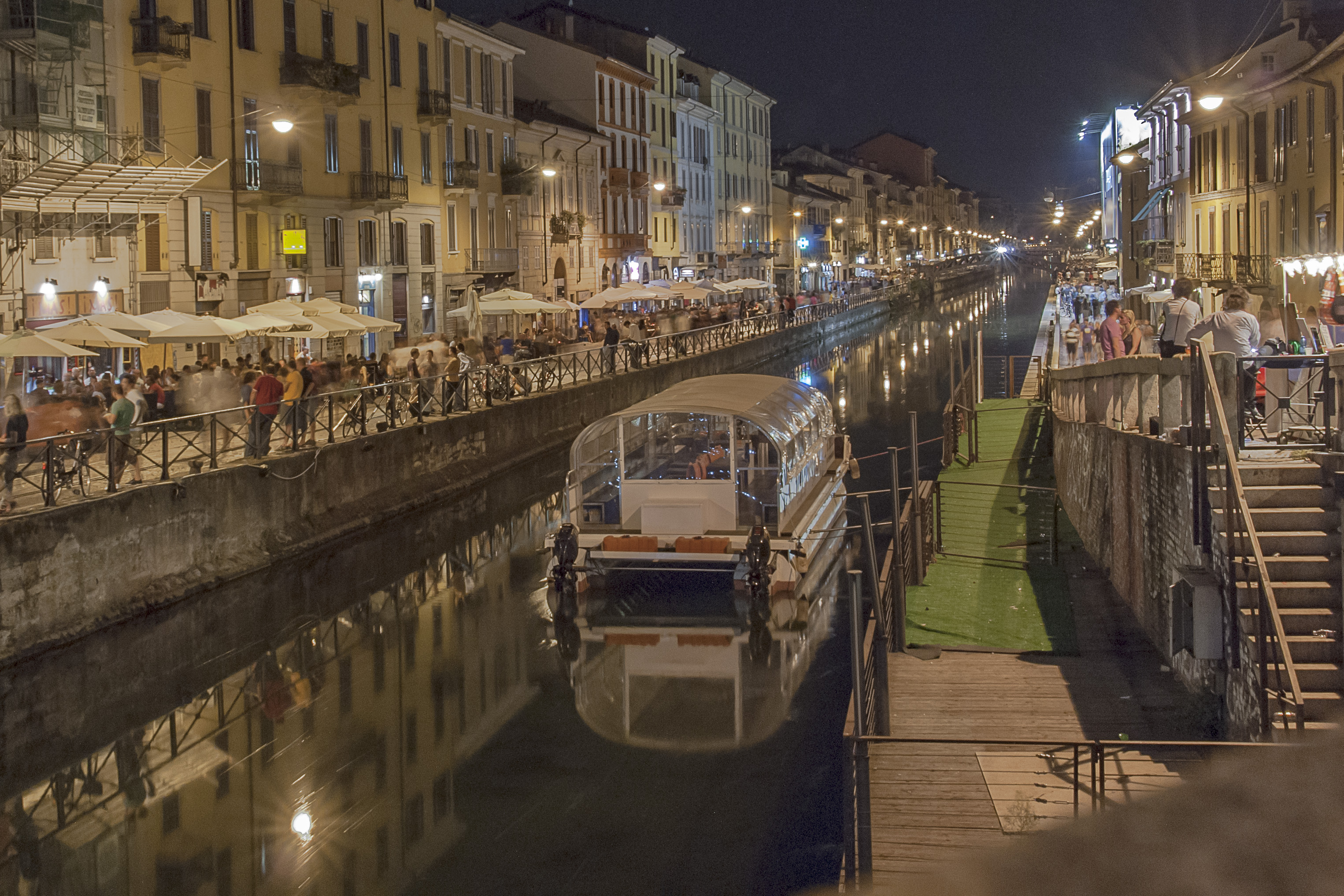
Navigli in Milan by night

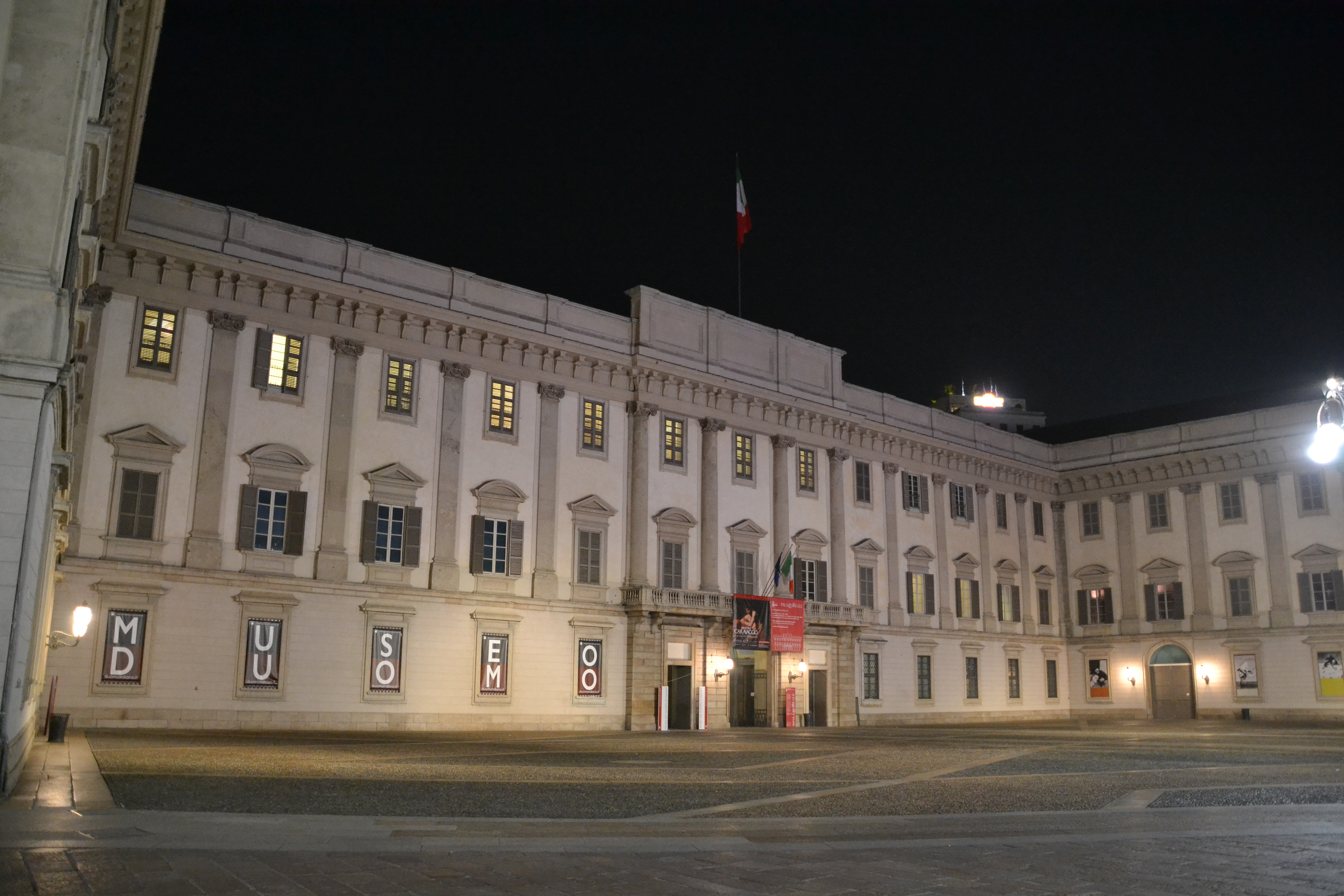
Royal Palace of Milan

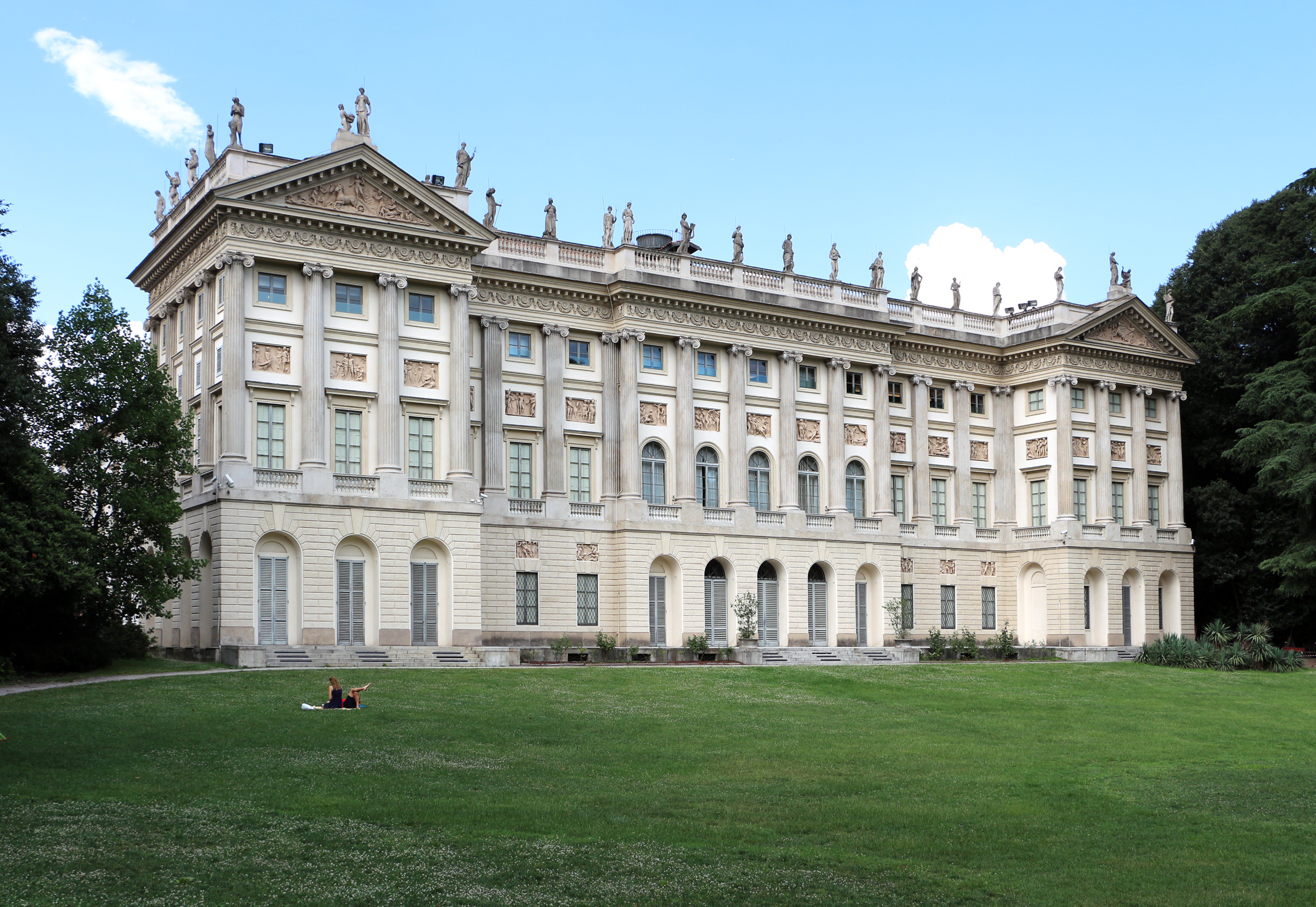
Royal Villa of Milan

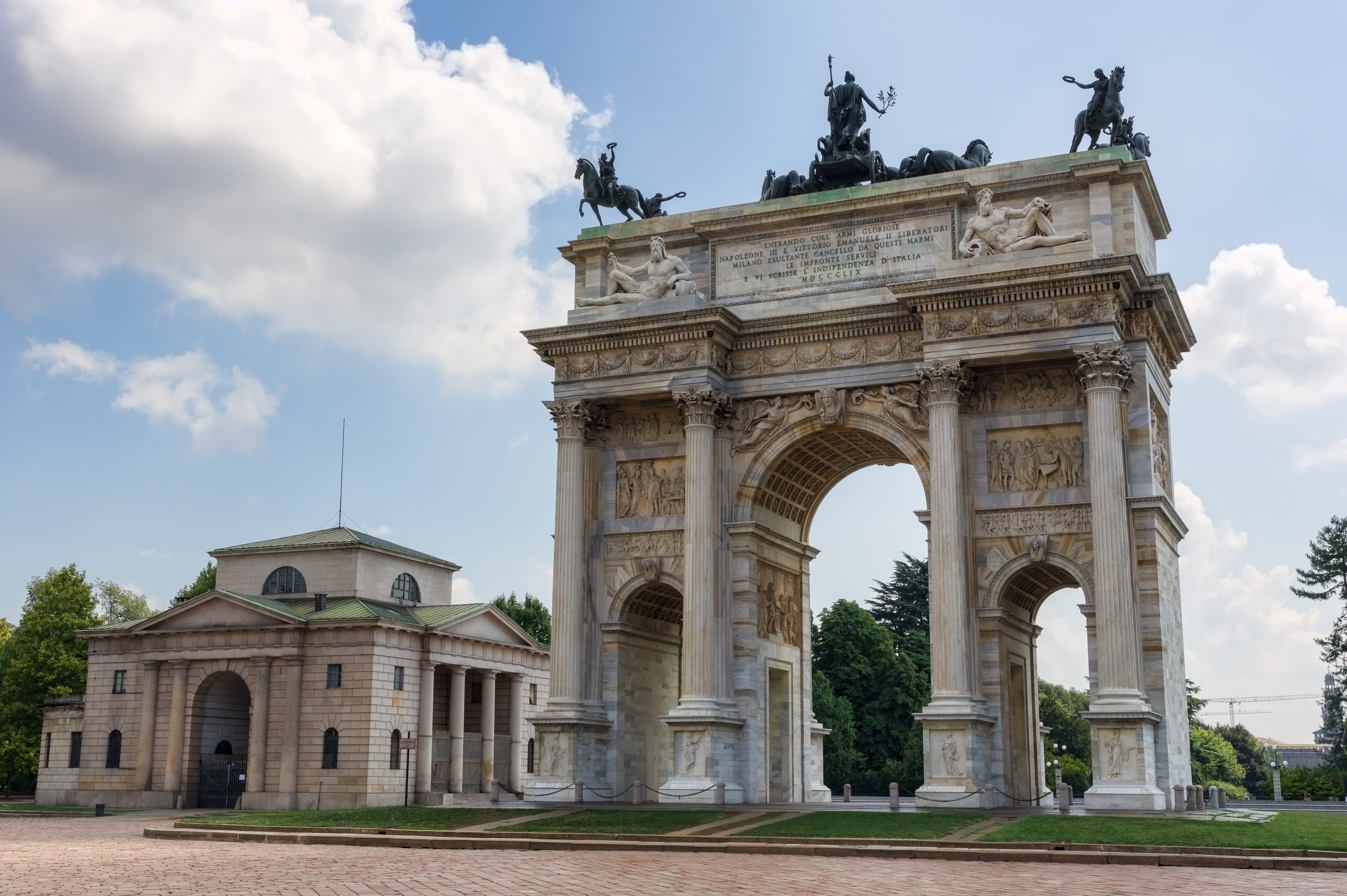
Porta Sempione

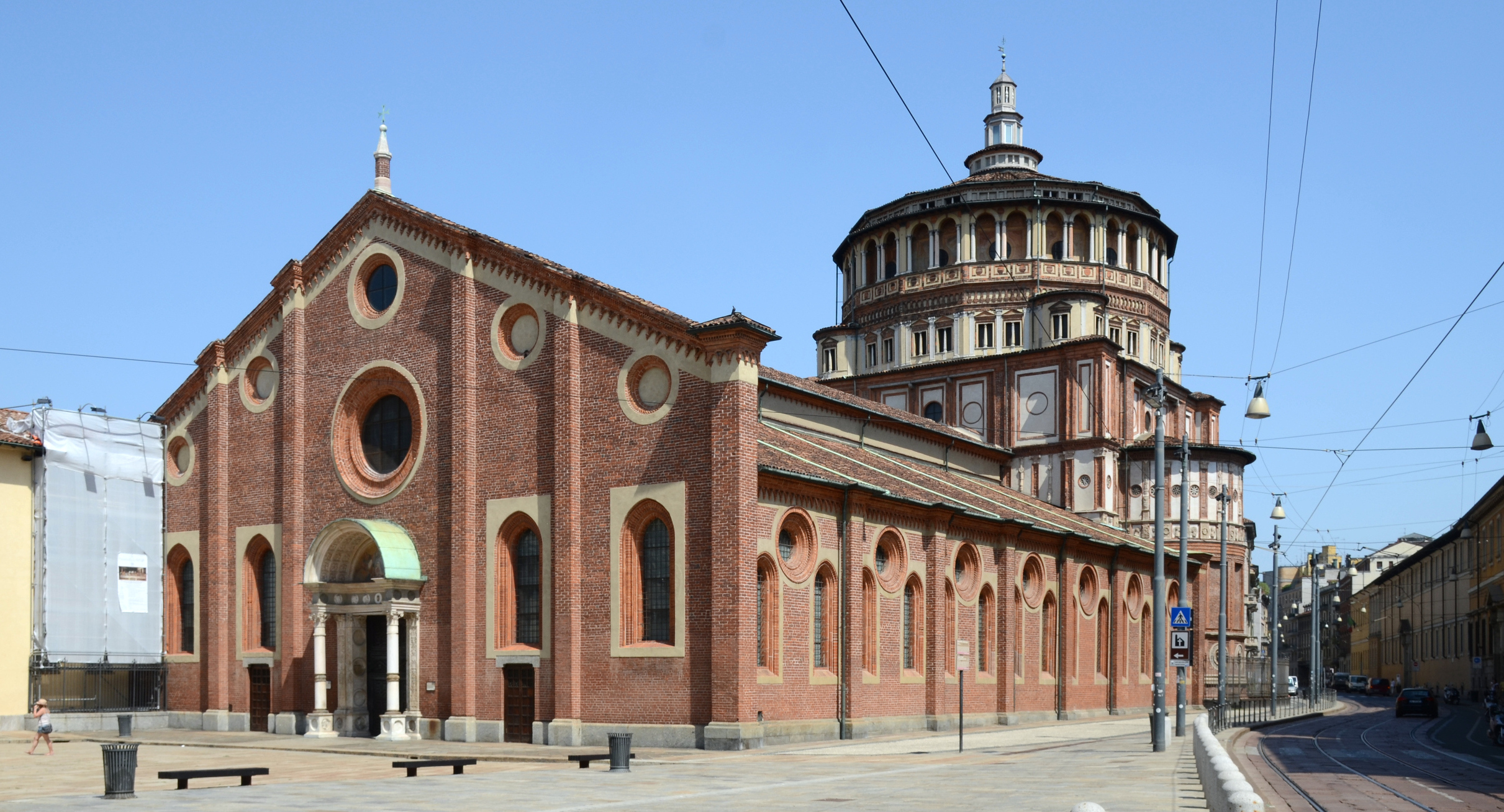
Santa Maria delle Grazie

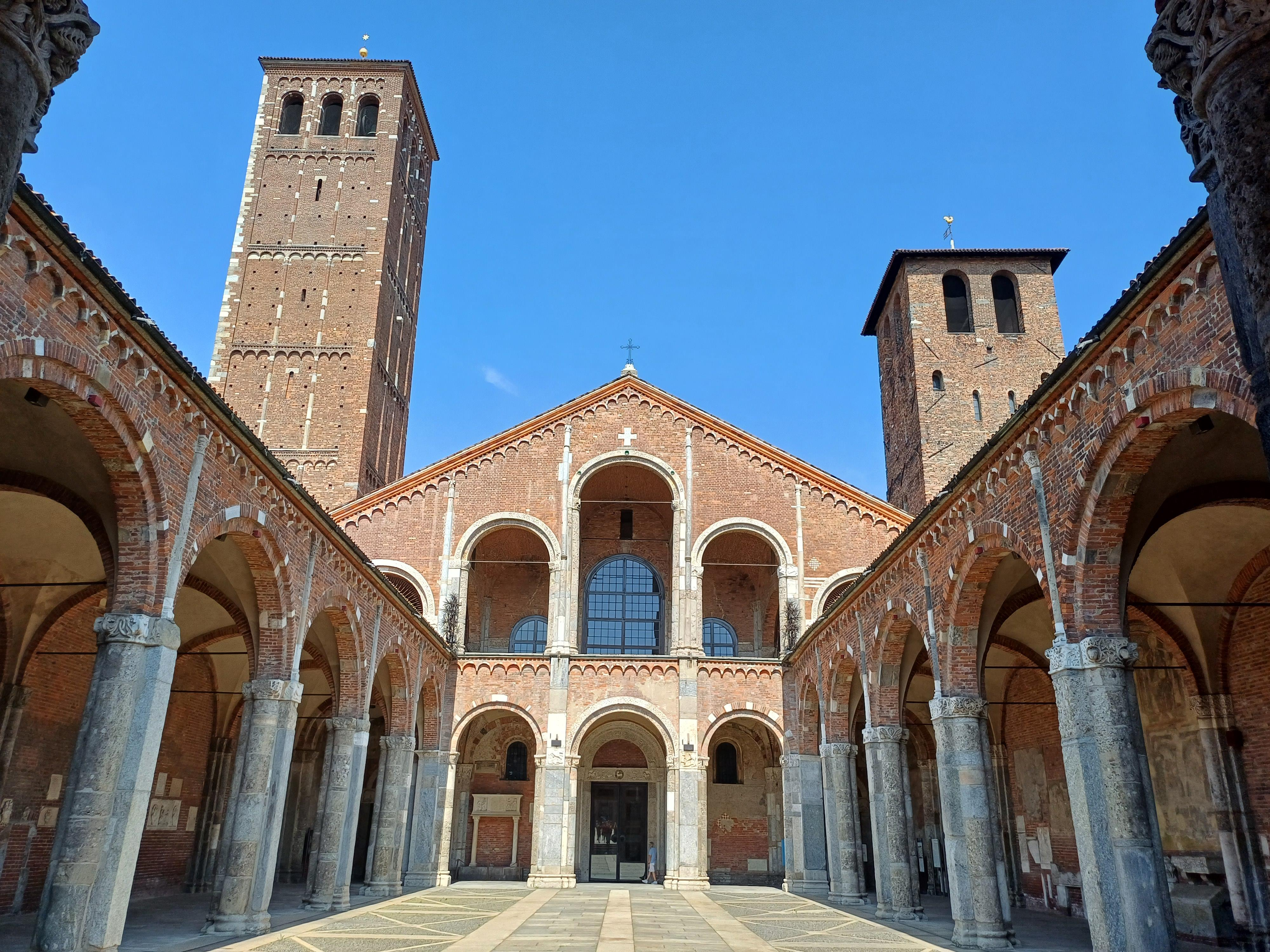
Basilica di Sant'Ambrogio

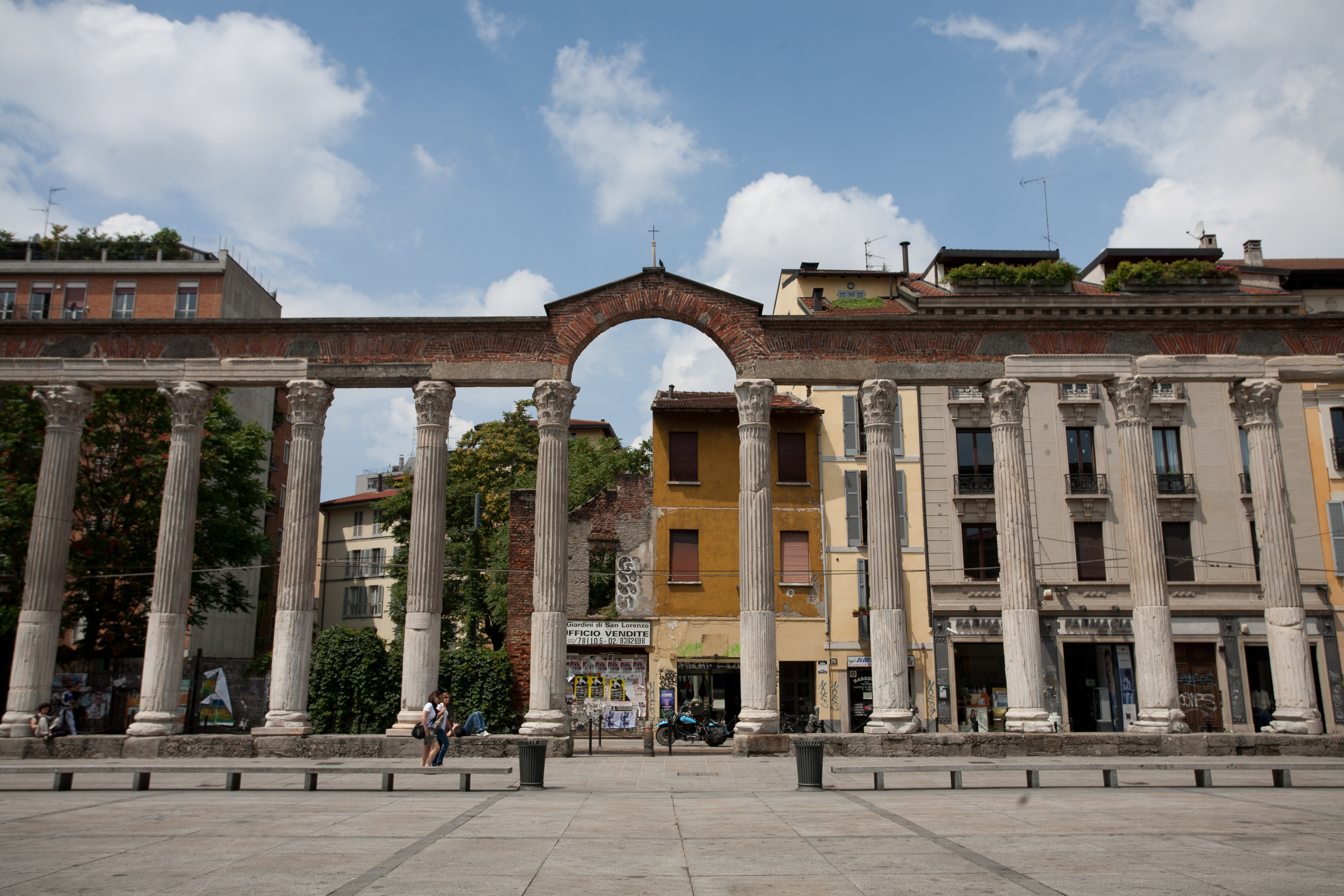
Colonne di San Lorenzo

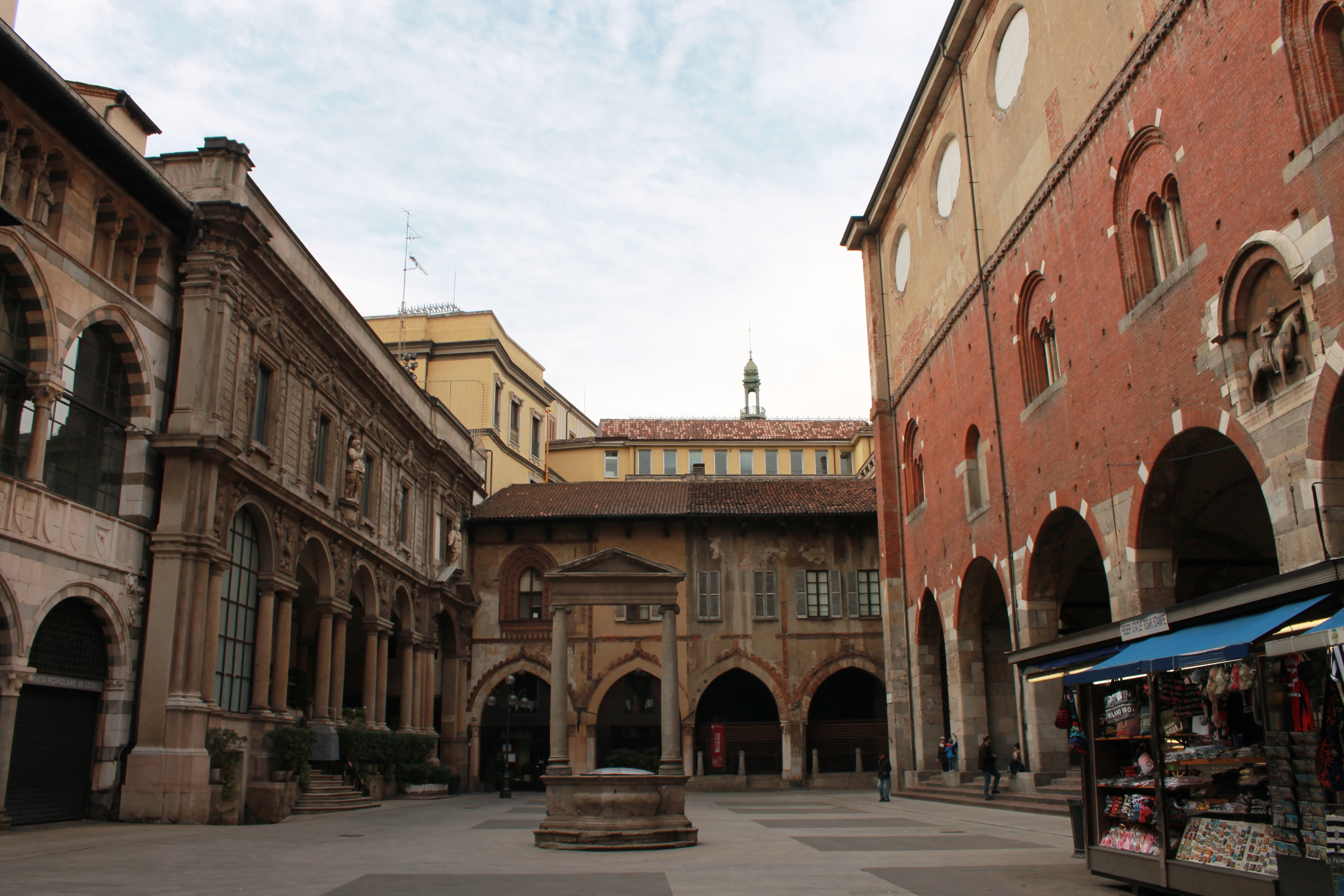
Piazza Mercanti

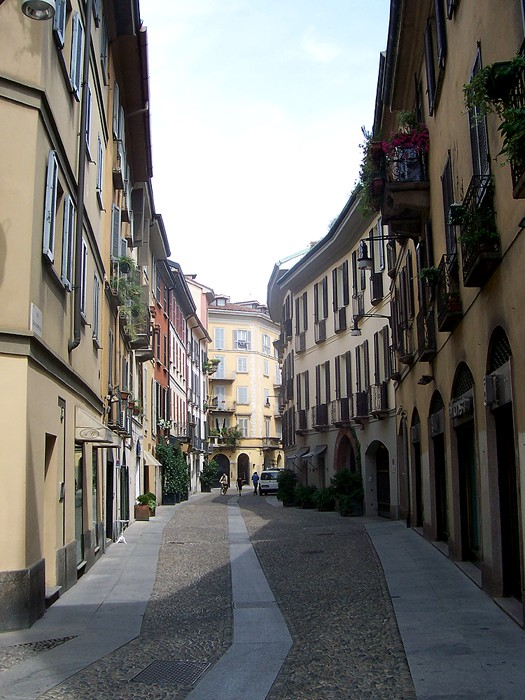
Brera district

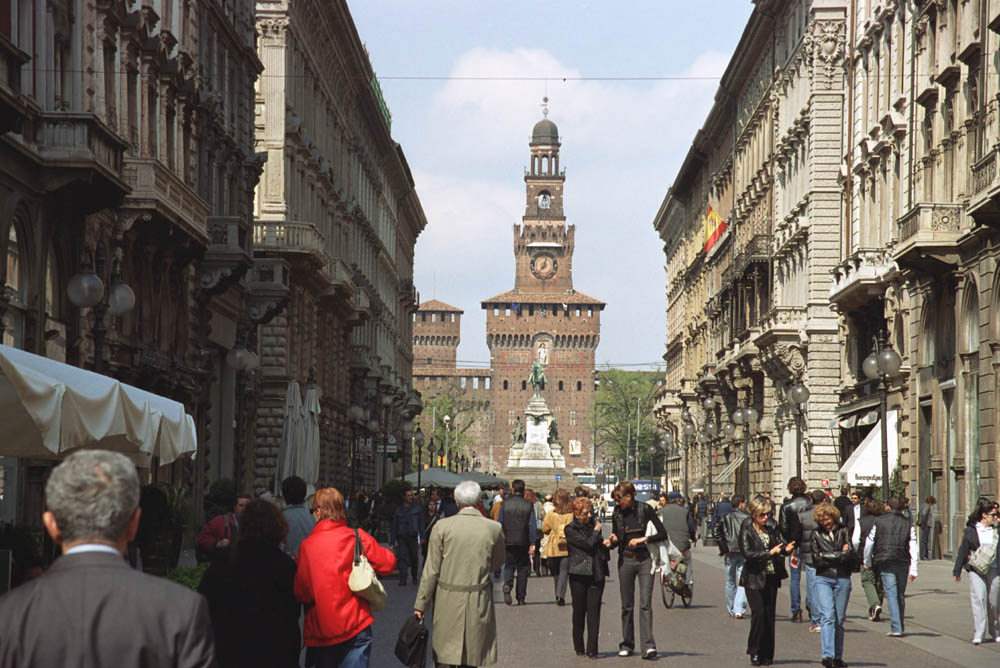
Via Dante

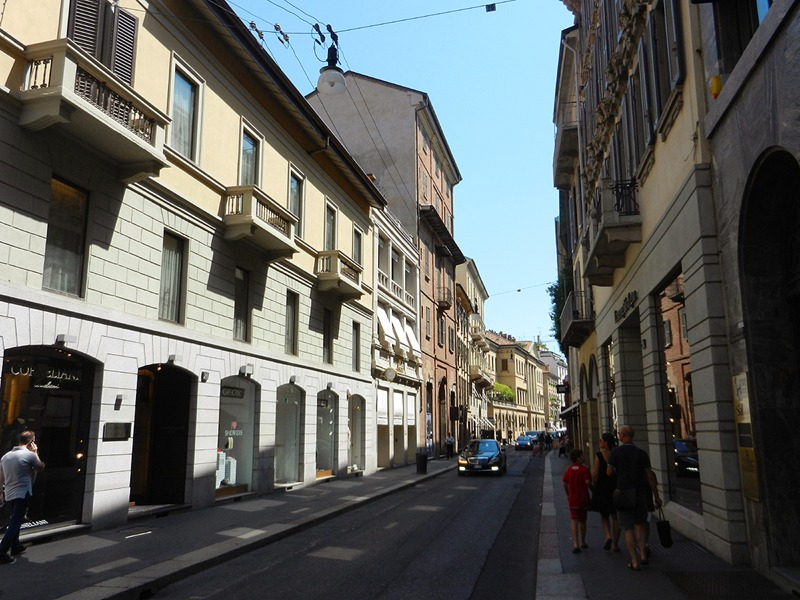
Via Monte Napoleone

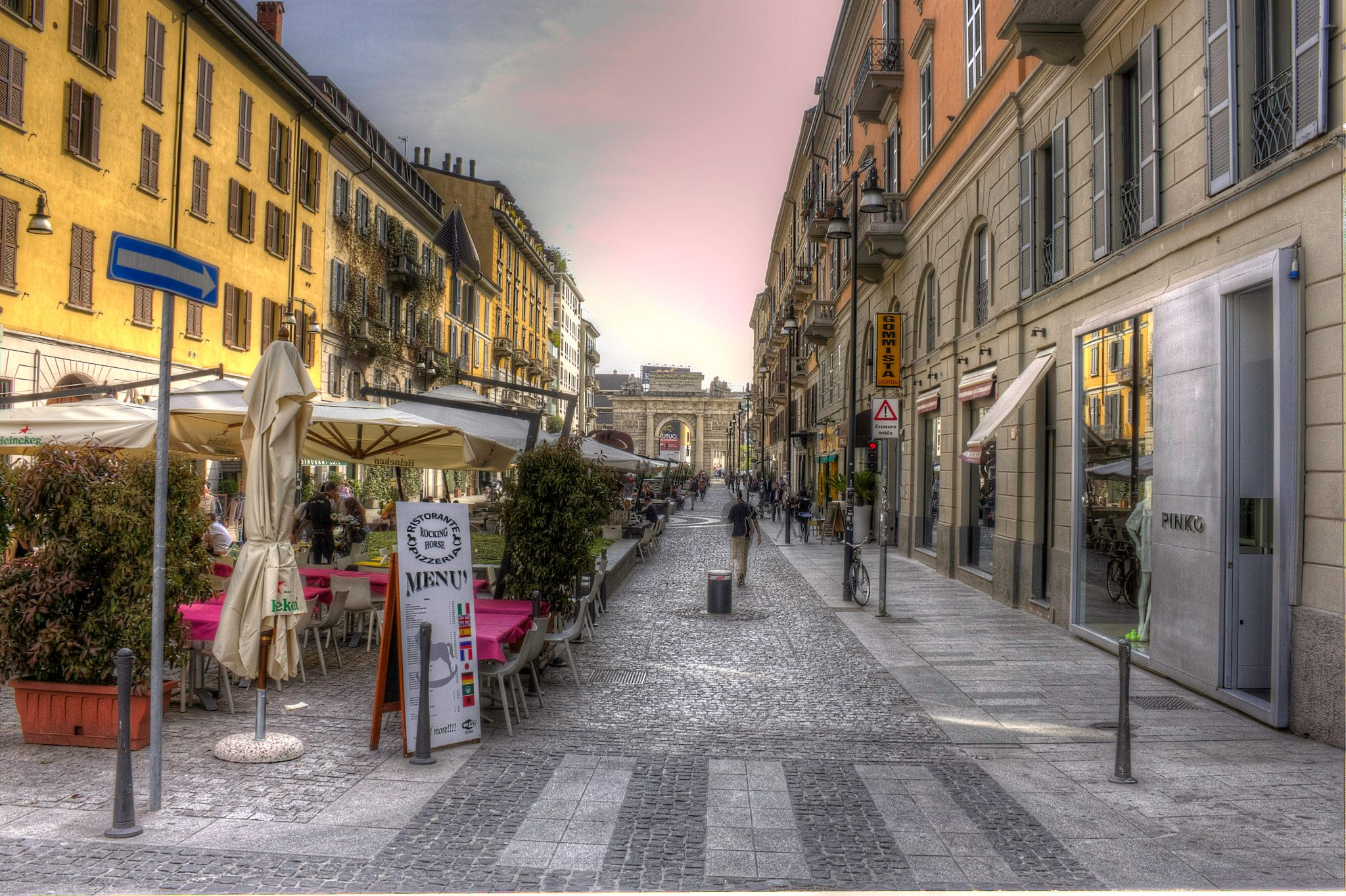
Corso Como

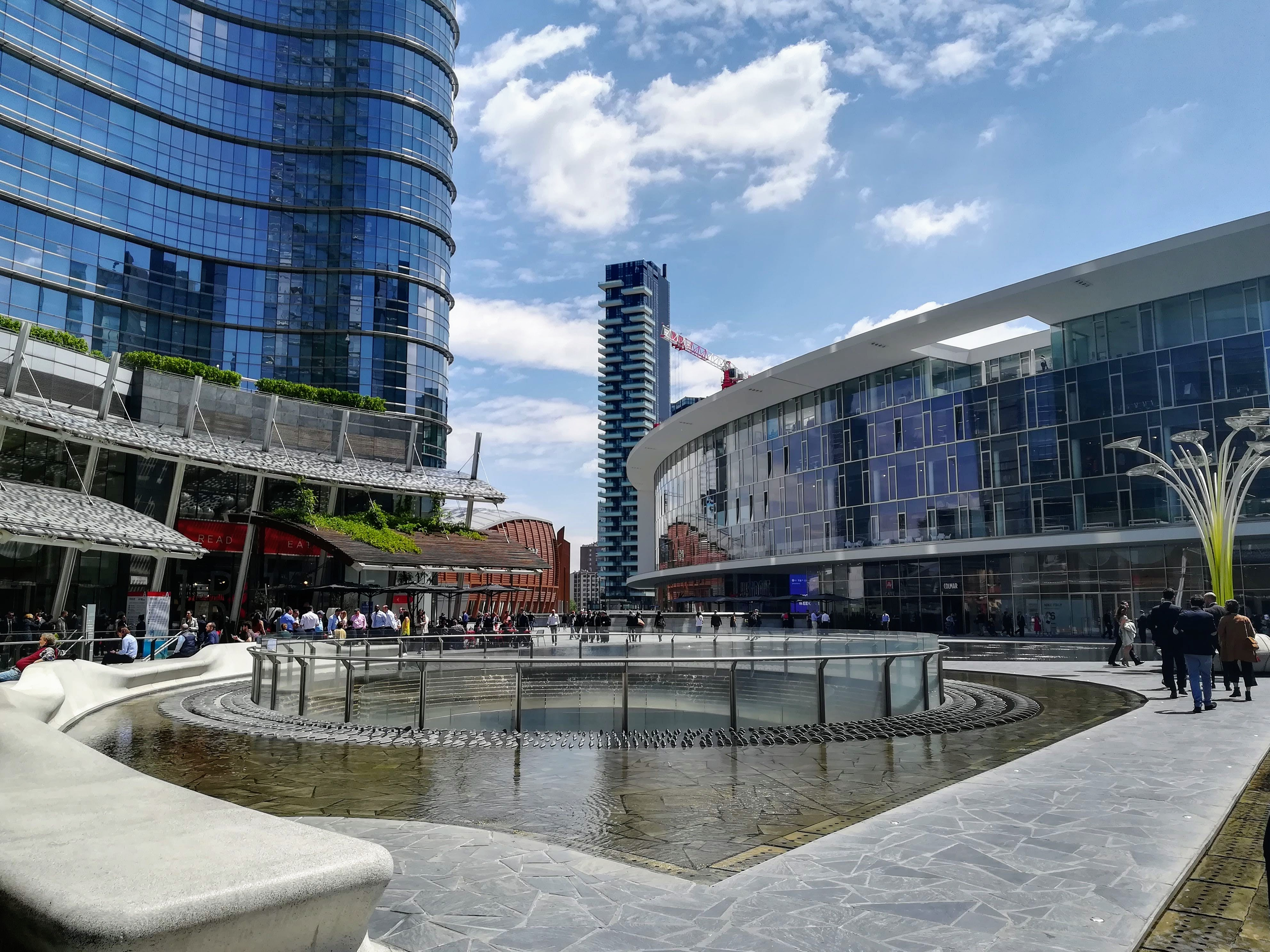
Piazza Gae Aulenti

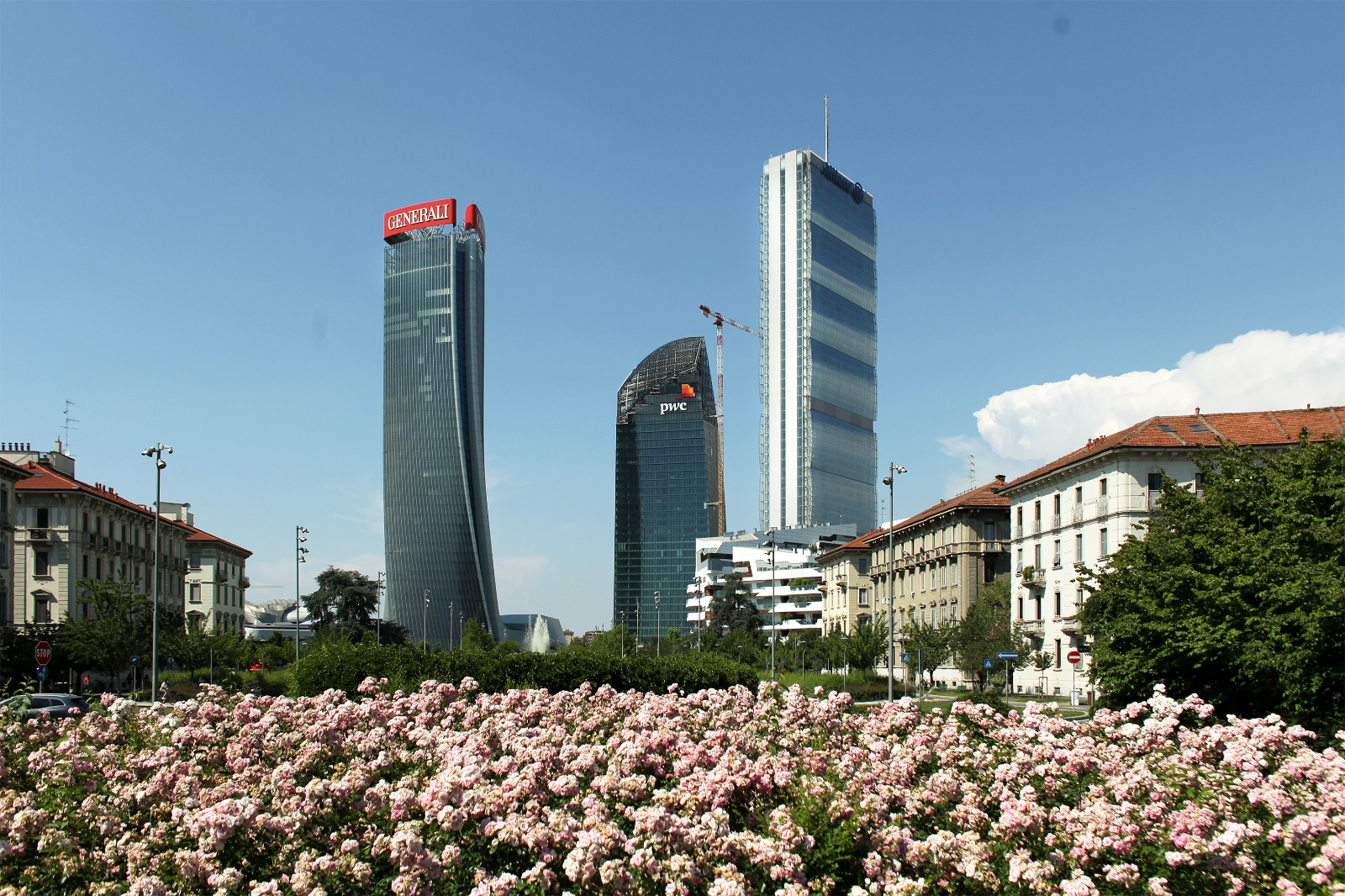
CityLife district

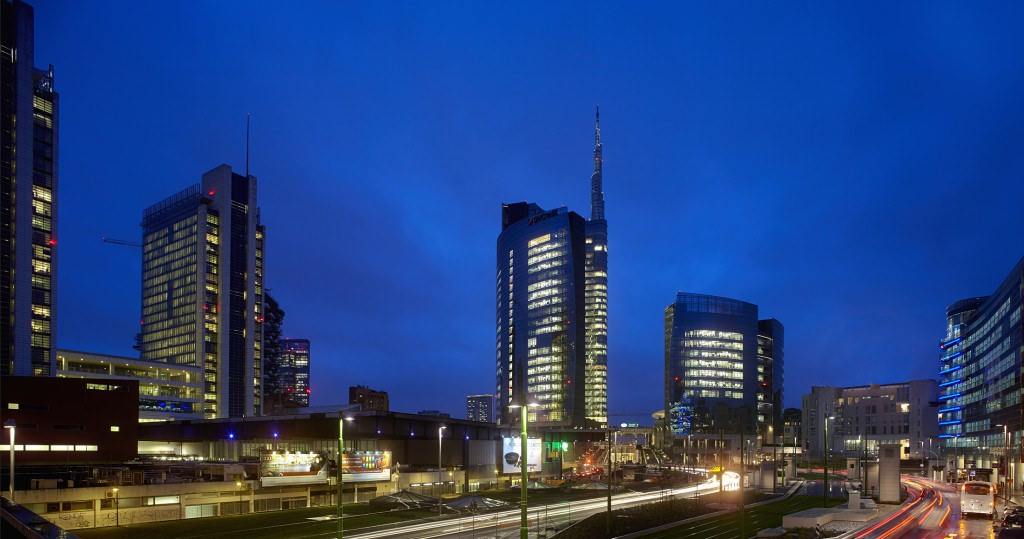
Porta Nuova district

== Museums ==
Milan has a plethora of museums, ranging from science and industry to antiquities and art. Below is a list of the main museums and permanent exhibitions in the city.

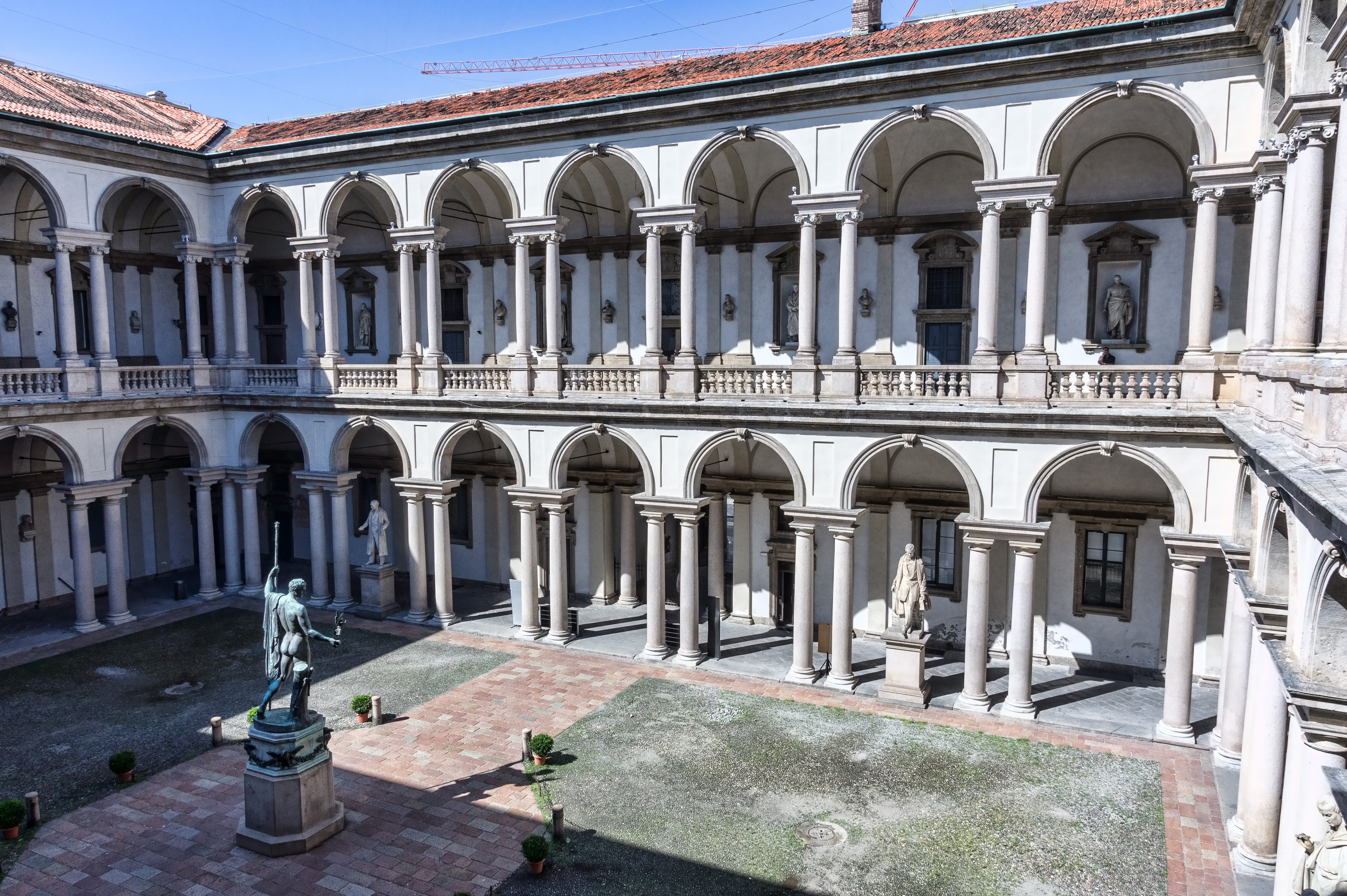
Pinacoteca di Brera

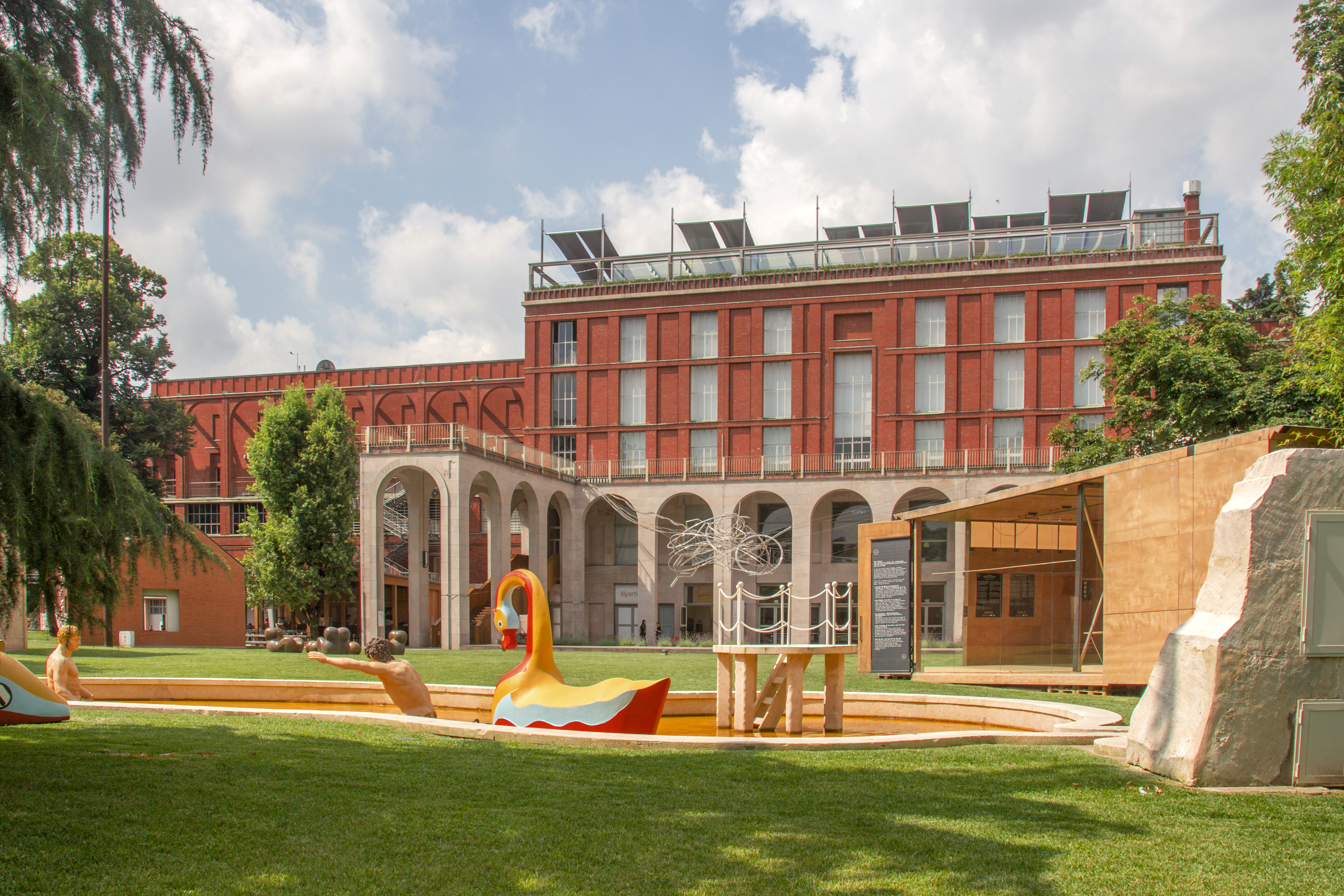
Triennale di Milano

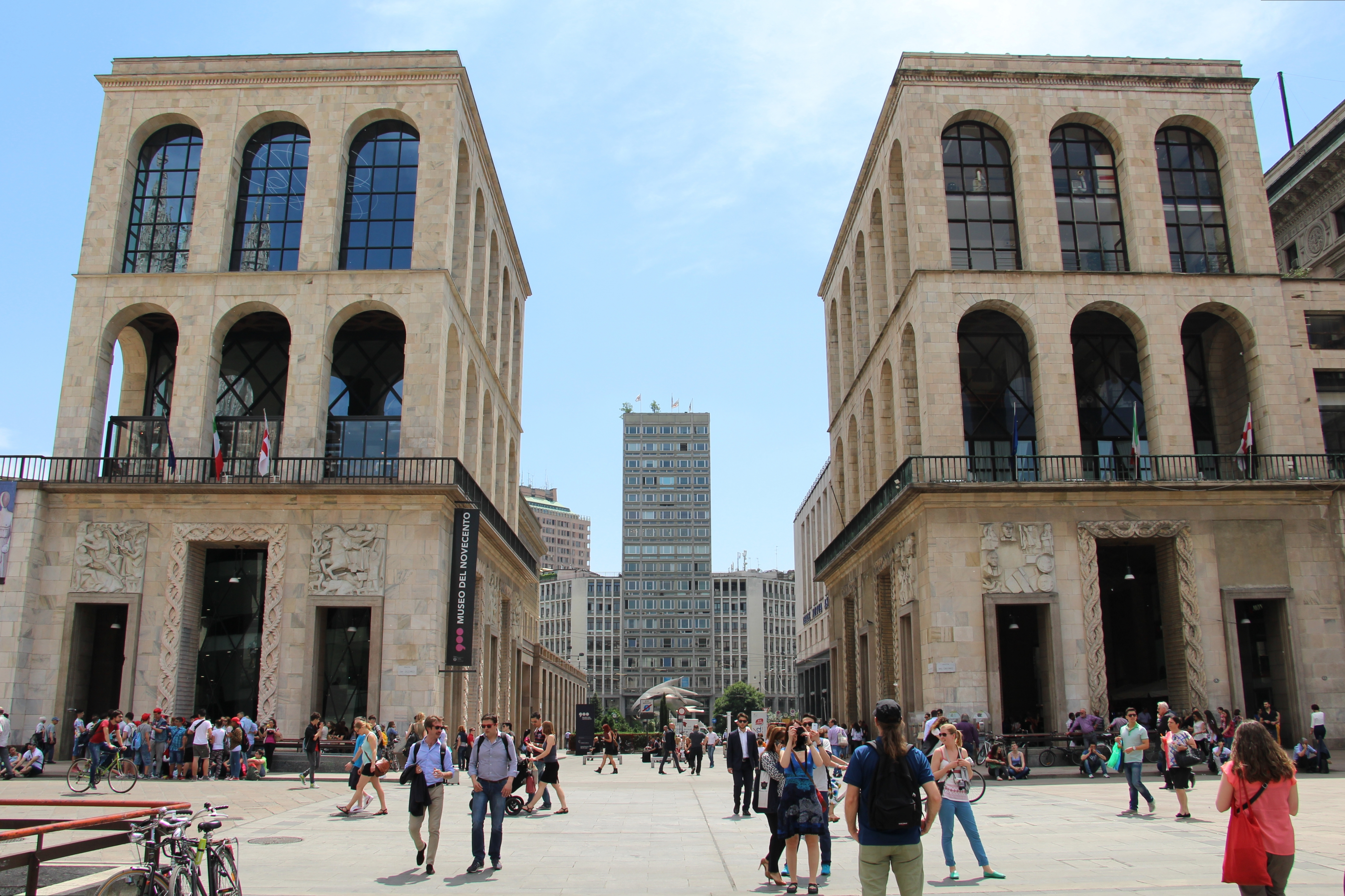
Museo del Novecento

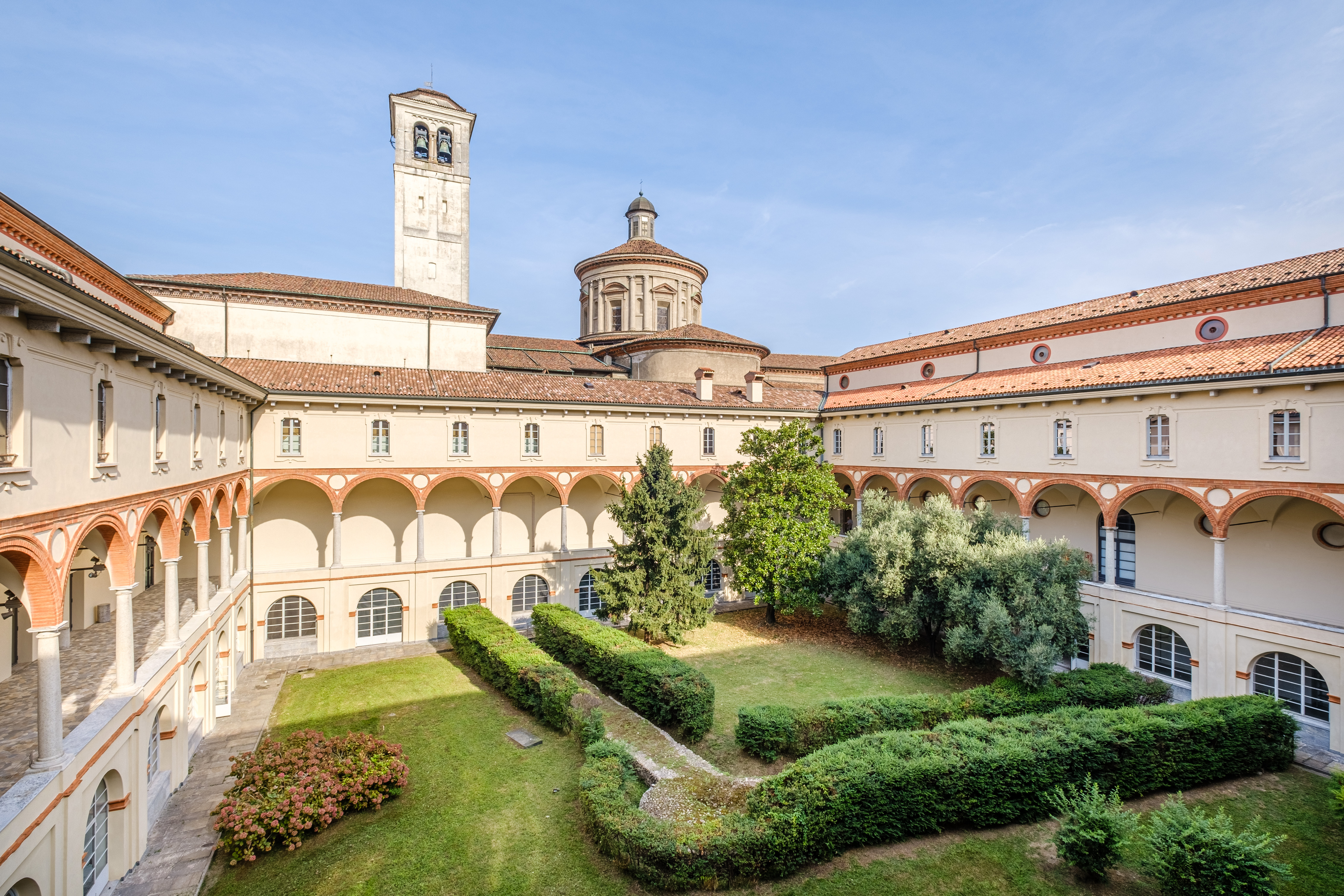
Museo Nazionale Scienza e Tecnologia Leonardo da Vinci

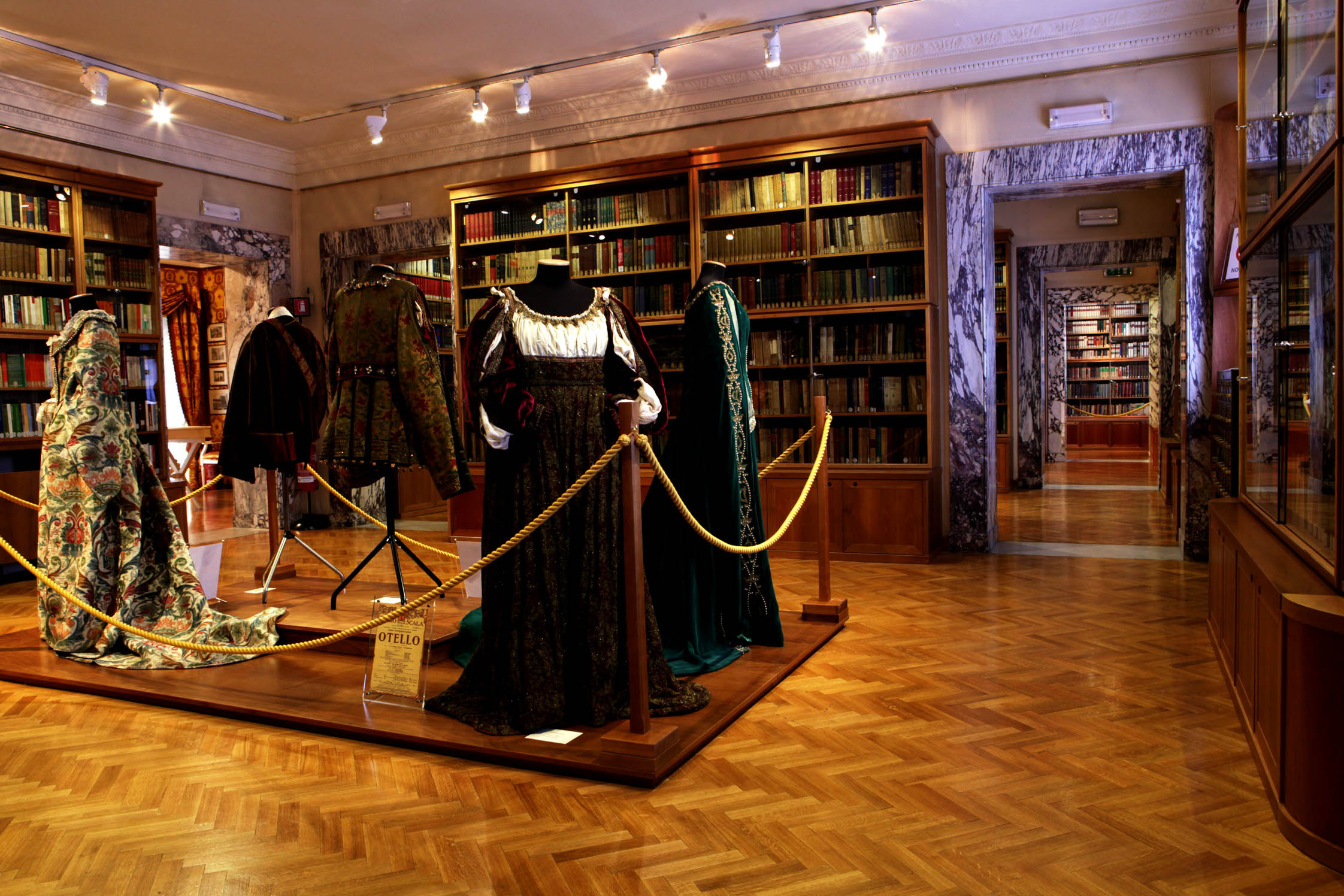
Museo Teatrale alla Scala

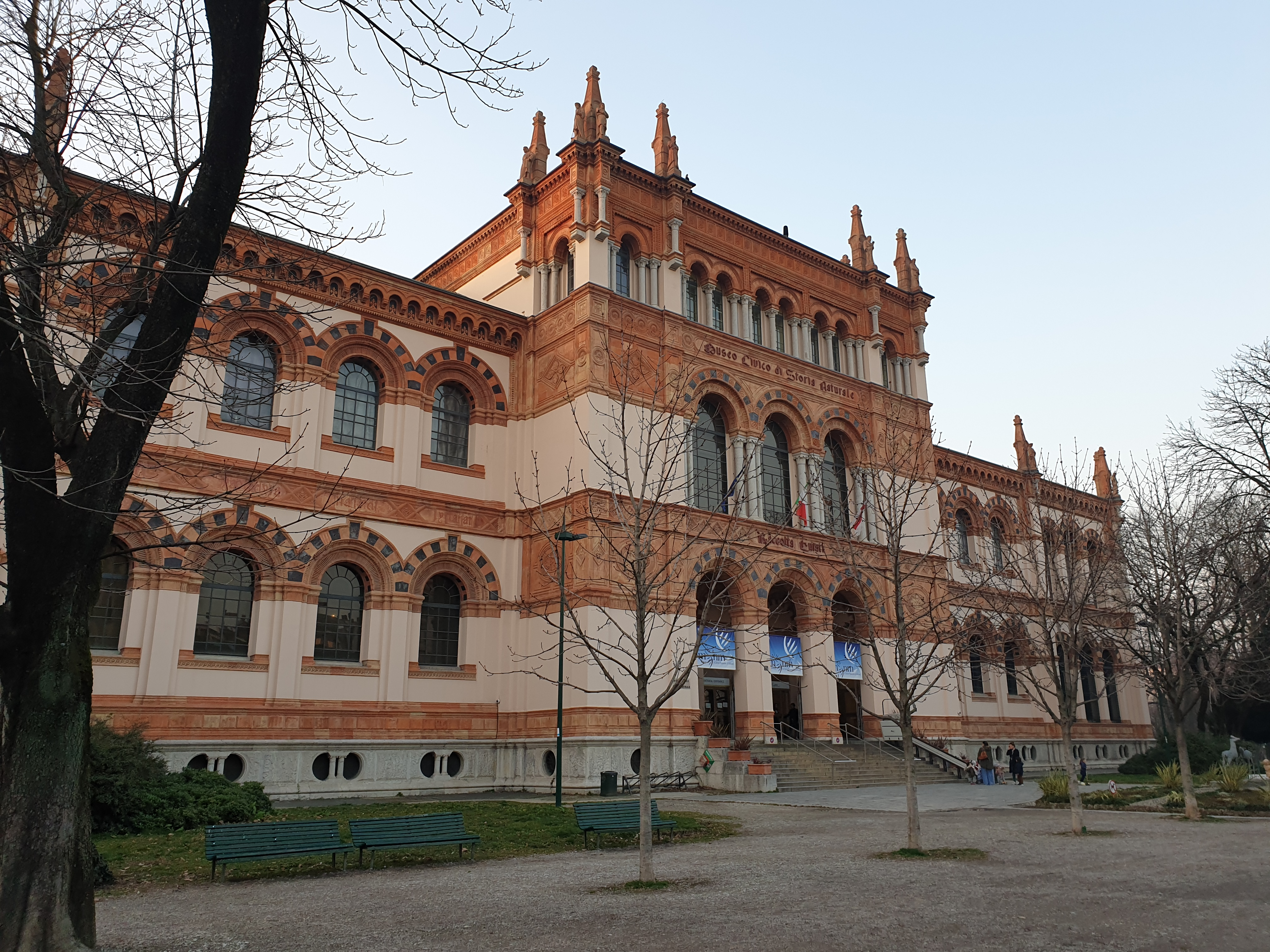
Museo Civico di Storia Naturale di Milano

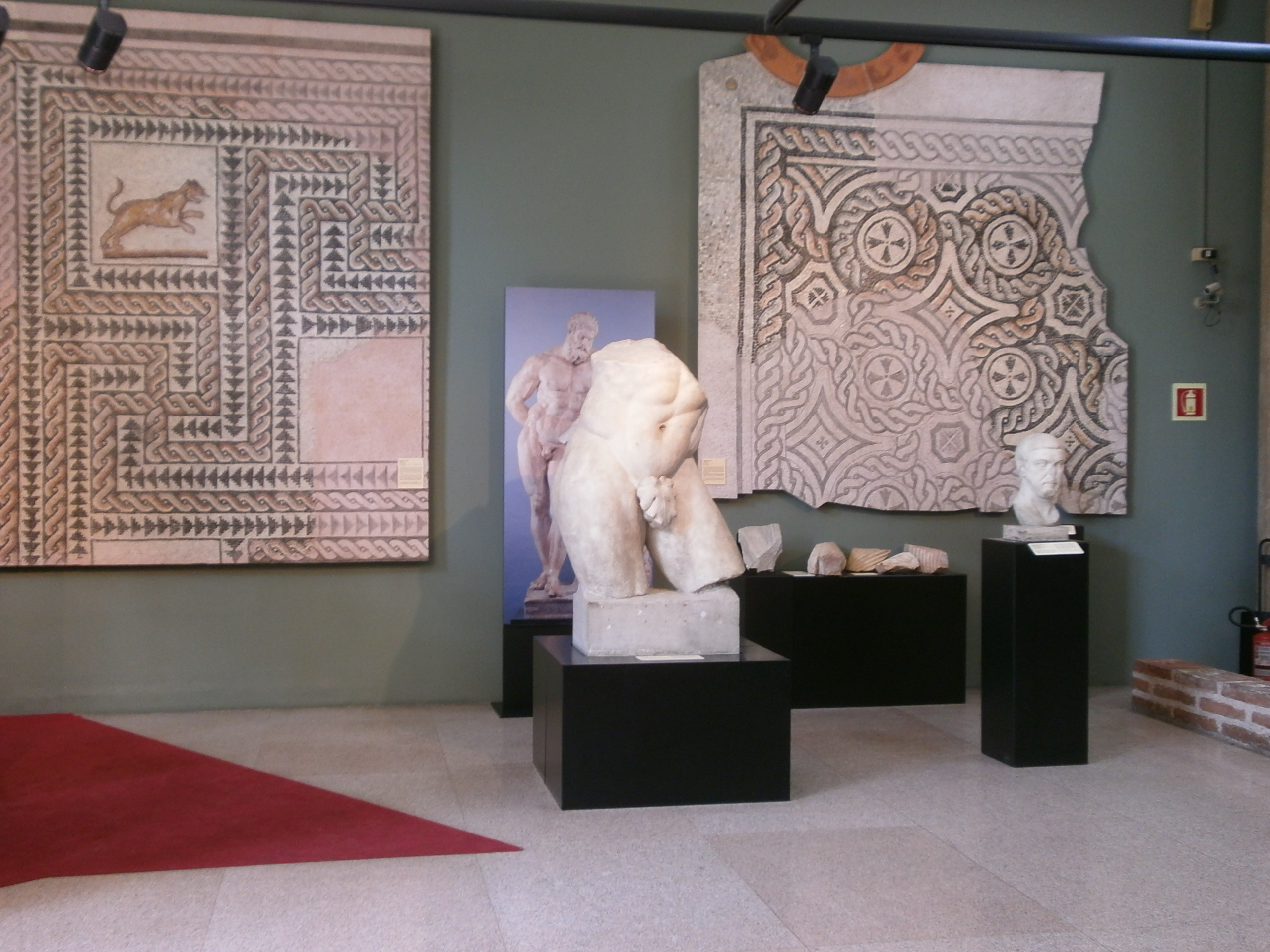
Archaeological Museum of Milan

- Pinacoteca di Brera, a public gallery of art set up in the 1700s hosting works by Francesco Hayez, Andrea Mantegna, Caravaggio, Anthony van Dyck, Titian, Donato Bramante and Piero della Francesca.
- Museo del Novecento, a museum created in 2010 with a collection of paintings and sculptures from the first half of the 20th century. Its collection has works by Italian futurists such as Umberto Boccioni, Giorgio de Chirico, Fortunato Depero. It also has works by foreign artists such as Paul Klee, Wassily Kandinsky, Pablo Picasso and Henri Matisse.
- Museo Civico di Storia Naturale di Milano, a museum of natural history. It boasts a whole sperm whale skeleton and a vast collection of dioramas.
- Sforza Castle museums, which are around 6 different museums, there being the Antique Furniture & Wooden Sculpture Museum, the Applied Arts Collection, the Egyptian Museum, the Museum of Musical Instruments, the Museo d'Arte Antica, and the Pinacoteca del Castello Sforzesco.
- Mudec, "the museum of cultures", a space hosting a permanent exhibition of artefacts from different cultures and many temporary exhibitions, such as one on Roy Lichtenstein during the summer of 2019
- Civic Aquarium of Milan, founded in 1906, is one of the oldest aquariums in the world. it is housed in a Viennese art nouveau building in the Parco Sempione area.
- ADI Design Museum displays the historic collection of the Compasso d'Oro design award.
- Planetario di Milano, inaugurated in 1930, continues to be Italy's largest planetarium as well as one of the most prominent in Europe and the rest of the world.
- Archaeological Museum of Milan is a civic collection of Ancient Greece, Romans, Etruscans and Early Middle Ages archeologic reperts.
- Galleria d'Arte Moderna (GAM), housed in the Villa Belgiojoso Bonaparte, hosts a collection largely of Italian and European works from the 18th to the 20th centuries.
- Gallerie d'Italia - Piazza Scala hosts a paintings and sculpture collection of 19th and 20th century belonging to Intesa Sanpaolo international banking group. Alongside hosts temporary exhibitions.
- Triennale di Milano. International cultural institution established in 1923, host exhibitions meetings and conferences. It showcases a permantent collection of Italian design and hosts the Triennale Teatro dell' Arte.
- Leonardo3 Museum. Leonardo da Vinci's 3D machines, physical reconstructions and restorations of artwork in virtual reality. Housed in the Vittorio Emanuele II Gallery.
- Memoriale della Shoah di Milano. Shoah memorial built on the site where Jews and political opponents were deported during the German occupation of Italy.
- Brera Astronomical Observatory. Houses scientific instruments that were used by astronomers from 1760 to the middle of the 20th century, including the Merz telescope that was used by Giovanni Schiaparelli for his early observations of Mars.
- Bagatti Valsecchi Museum. One of the well-preserved house museums in the world. Hosts a collection of 15th and 16th century paintings and artefacts.
- Diocesan Museum of Milan. Houses a permanent collection of sacred artworks, especially from Milan and Lombardy area.
- Museo Nazionale Scienza e Tecnologia Leonardo da Vinci. One of the biggest science museum in Europe. It is also home of the submarine Toti and Vega space vector.
- Museo Poldi Pezzoli. Displays a collection of paintings and decorative arts from archeological times to 19th century, belonged to Gian Giacomo Poldi Pezzoli.
- Museo Teatrale alla Scala. Founded in 1913, reopened in 2004 after restoration works. Showing a collection of artifacts, paintings and instruments related to the Teatro alla Scala opera house history.
- PAC - Padiglione d'Arte Contemporanea. Exhibition venue of Italian and international contemporary artists designed by architect Ignazio Gardella.
- Palazzo Moriggia - Museo del Risorgimento. The collection include works and antiques from the Napoleonic period to the annexation of Rome by the kingdom of Italy.
- Royal Palace of Milan. Milan's main exhibition venue from ancient to contemporary art shows.
- San Siro Museum. About Inter Milan and A.C. Milan football clubs.
- Veneranda Biblioteca Ambrosiana. Historic library founded in 1609 by Cardinal Federico Borromeo, also housing a painting collection most from the Renaissance, one of the main in the city.
- Museo Alfa Romeo is Alfa Romeo's official museum, located in Arese (Milan), and displaying a permanent collection of Alfa Romeo cars and engines. After being closed down in 2011, the museum reopened in June 2015.
- Armani/Silos is a fashion art museum in Milan, Italy dedicated to the Armani style founded by Giorgio Armani. The opening exhibition was divided into themes: Ground floor ("Heimat: A Sense of Belonging", the dedicated to Peter Lindbergh (until August 2021)); First floor (Androgynous); Second floor (Ethnicities); Third floor (Stars / Digital Archive).
- Bagatti Valsecchi Museum. Its permanent collections principally contain Italian Renaissance decorative arts (such as maiolica, furniture, tapestry, metalwork, leather, glassware and precious table-top coffers made of ivory, or “stucco and pastiglia”), some sculptures (including a Madonna and Child lunette by a follower of Donatello), and many paintings. European Renaissance weapons, armor, clocks and a few textiles and scientific and musical instruments complete the collection assembled by the Barons Bagatti Valsecchi, and displayed in their home, as per their wishes.
- Gallerie di Piazza Scala is a modern and contemporary museum in Milan, Italy. Located in Piazza della Scala in the Palazzo Brentani and the Palazzo Anguissola Antona Traversi, it hosts 195 artworks from the collections of Fondazione Cariplo with a strong representation of 19th century Lombard painters and sculptors, including Antonio Canova and Umberto Boccioni. A new section was opened in the Palazzo della Banca Commerciale Italiana on 25 October 2012 with 189 art works from the 20th century.
- The Museum of the Risorgimento, located in the 18th-century Milanese Palazzo Moriggia, houses a collection of objects and artworks which illustrate the history of Italian unification from Napoleon's first Italian campaign of 1796 to the annexation of Rome in 1870. The city of Milan played a key role in the process, most notably on the occasion of the 1848 uprising against the Austrians known as the Five Days of Milan.

== Libraries ==
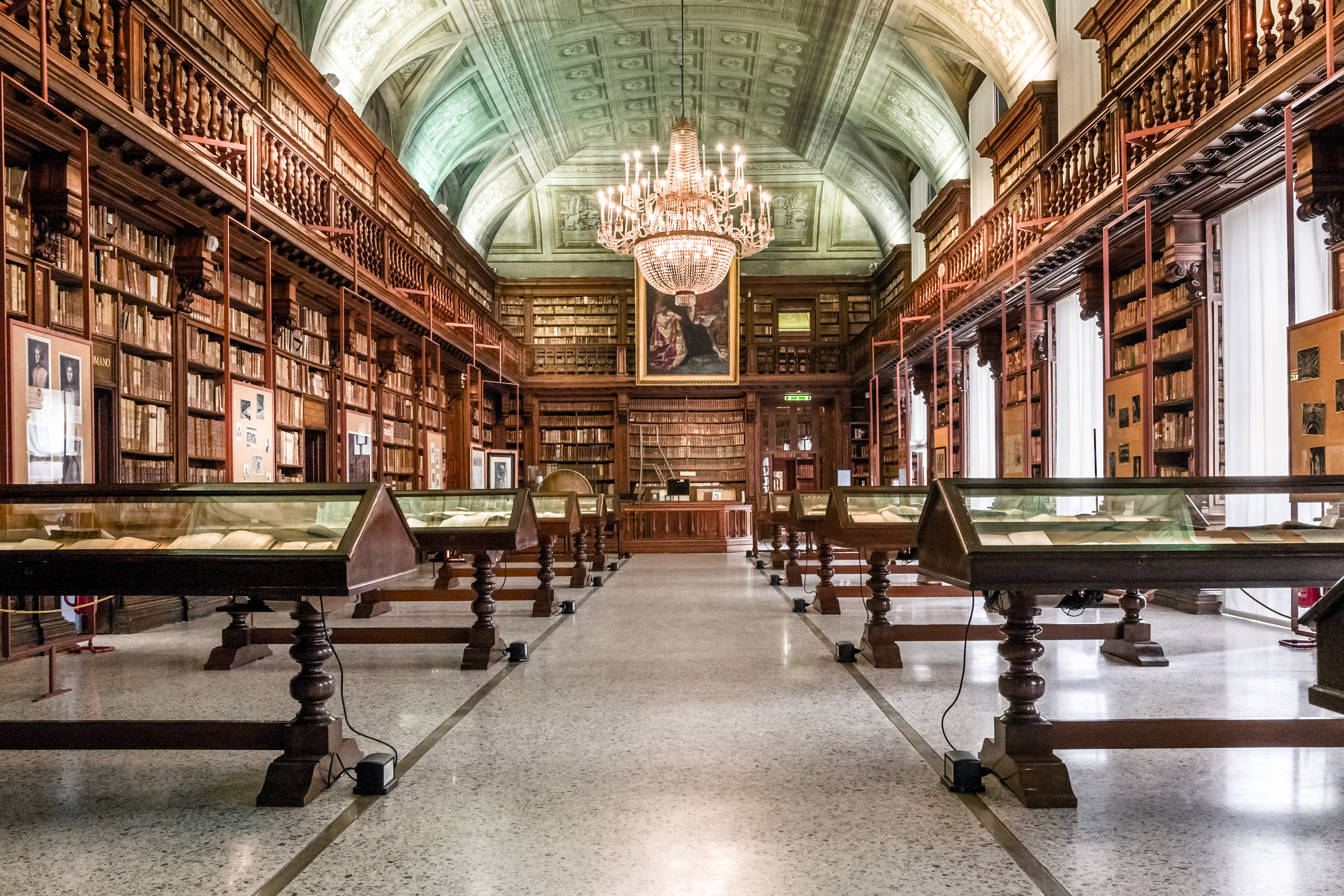
Biblioteca di Brera

- The Biblioteca Ambrosiana is a historic library in Milan. Named after Ambrose, the patron saint of Milan, it was founded in 1609 by Cardinal Federico Borromeo, whose agents scoured Western Europe and even Greece and Syria for books and manuscripts. Some major acquisitions of complete libraries were the manuscripts of the Benedictine monastery of Bobbio (1606) and the library of the Paduan Vincenzo Pinelli, whose more than 800 manuscripts filled 70 cases when they were sent to Milan and included the famous Iliad, the Ilias Picta.
- The Biblioteca Nazionale Braidense or Braidense National Library, usually known as the Biblioteca di Brera, is a public library in Milan. It is one of the largest libraries in Italy. Initially it contained large historical and scientific collections before it was charged with the legal deposit of all publications from Milan. Since 1880, it has had the status of a national library and is today one of the 47 Italian State libraries.

== Parks and open spaces ==
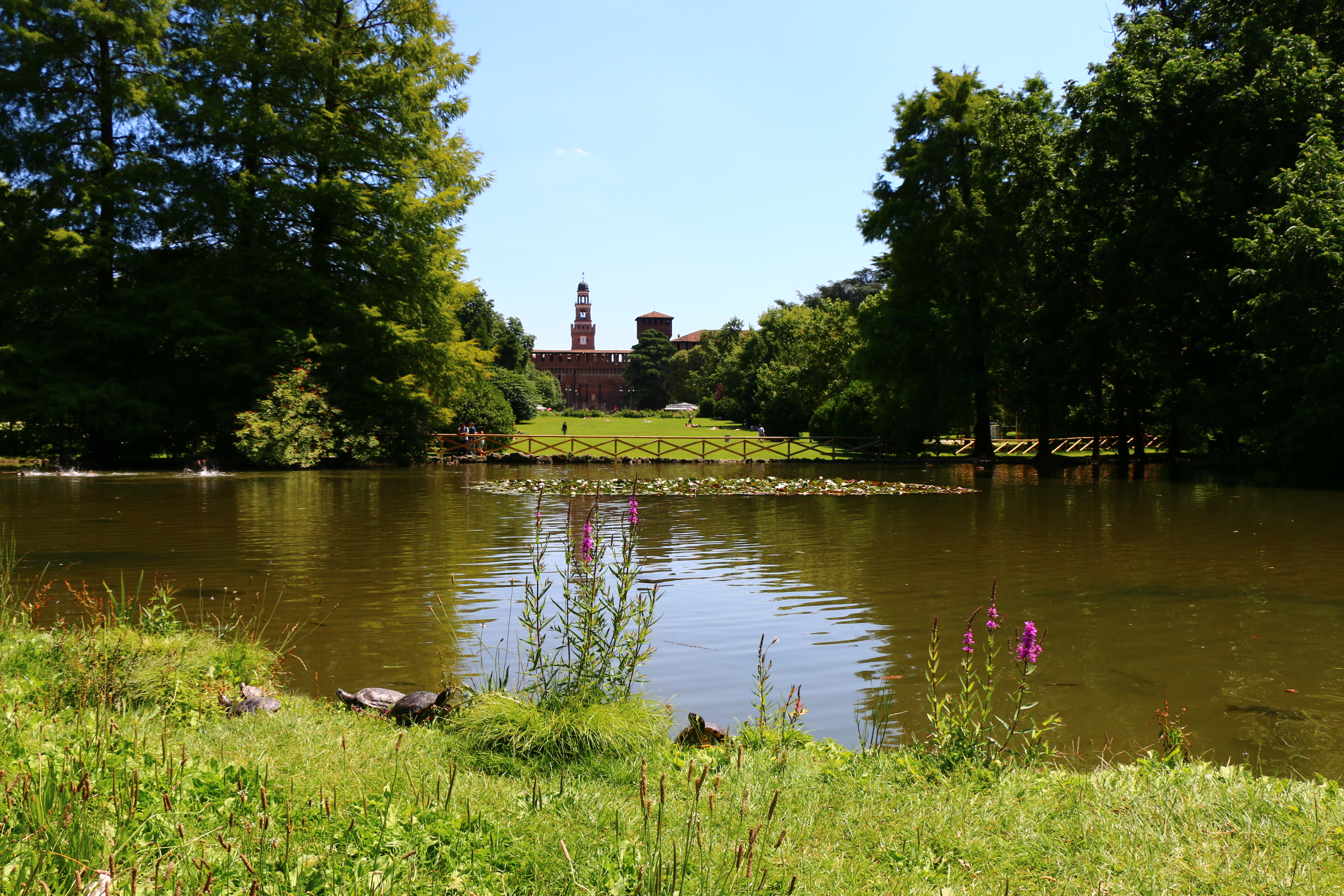
Parco Sempione

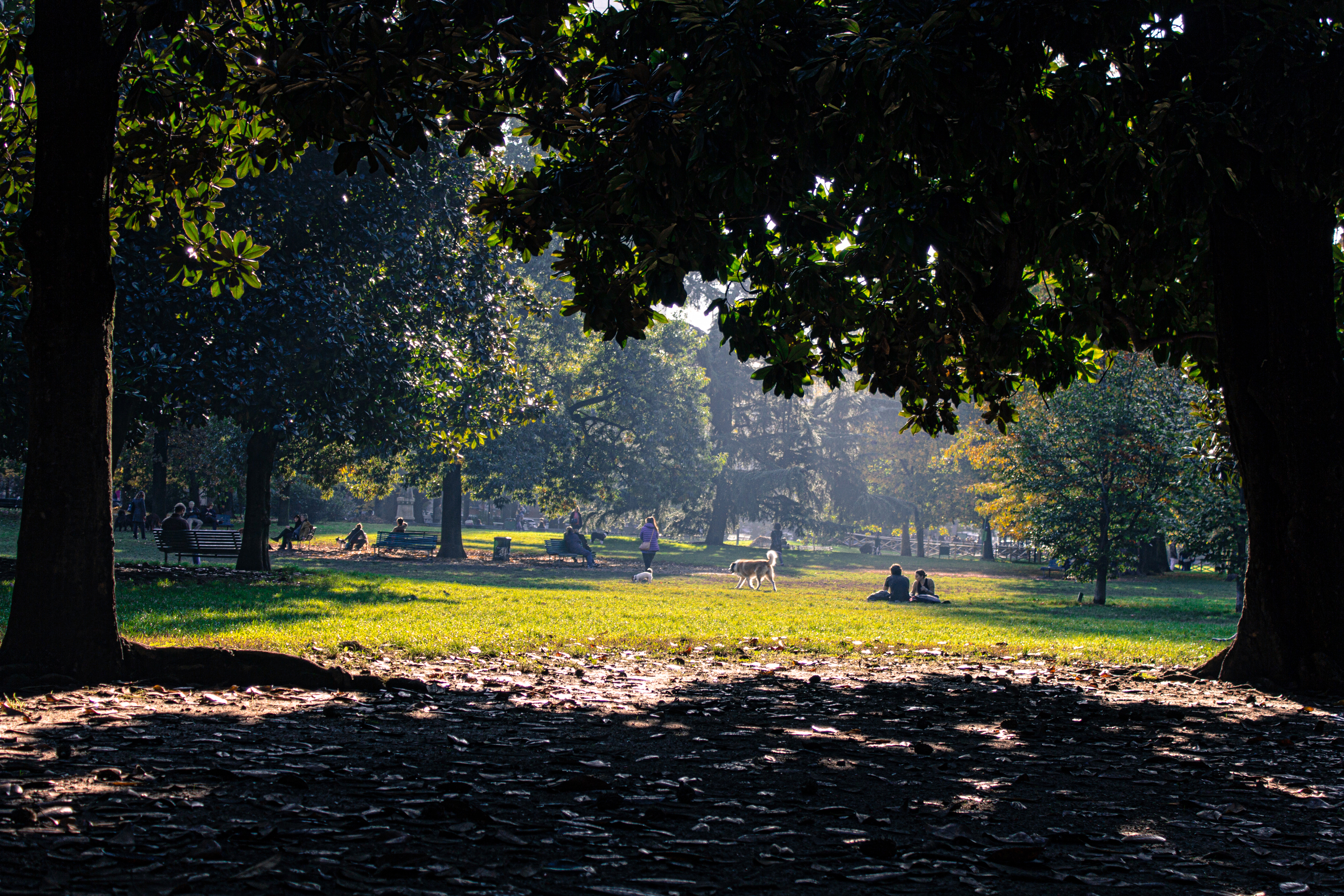
Giardini Pubblici Indro Montanelli

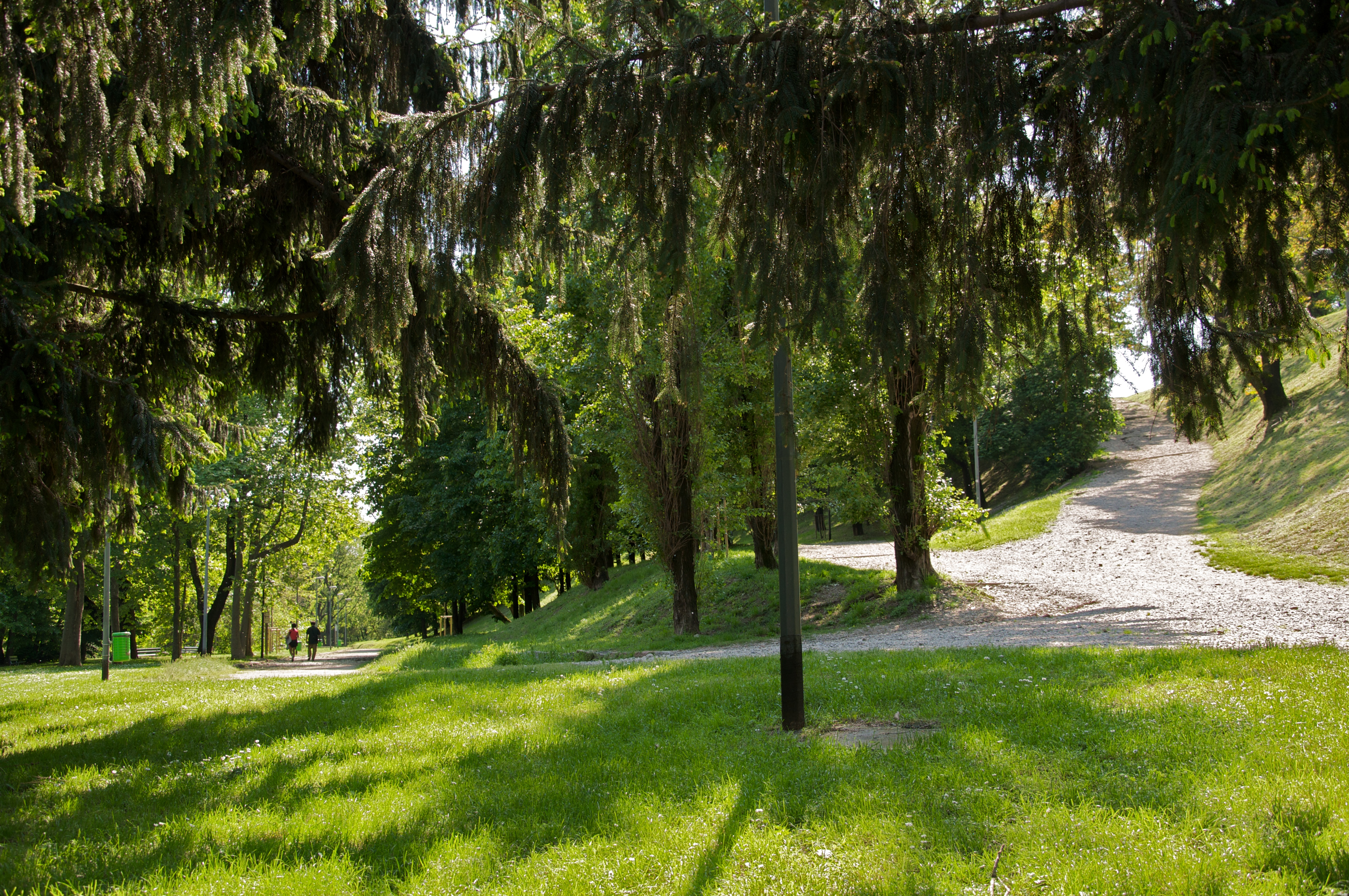
Monte Stella

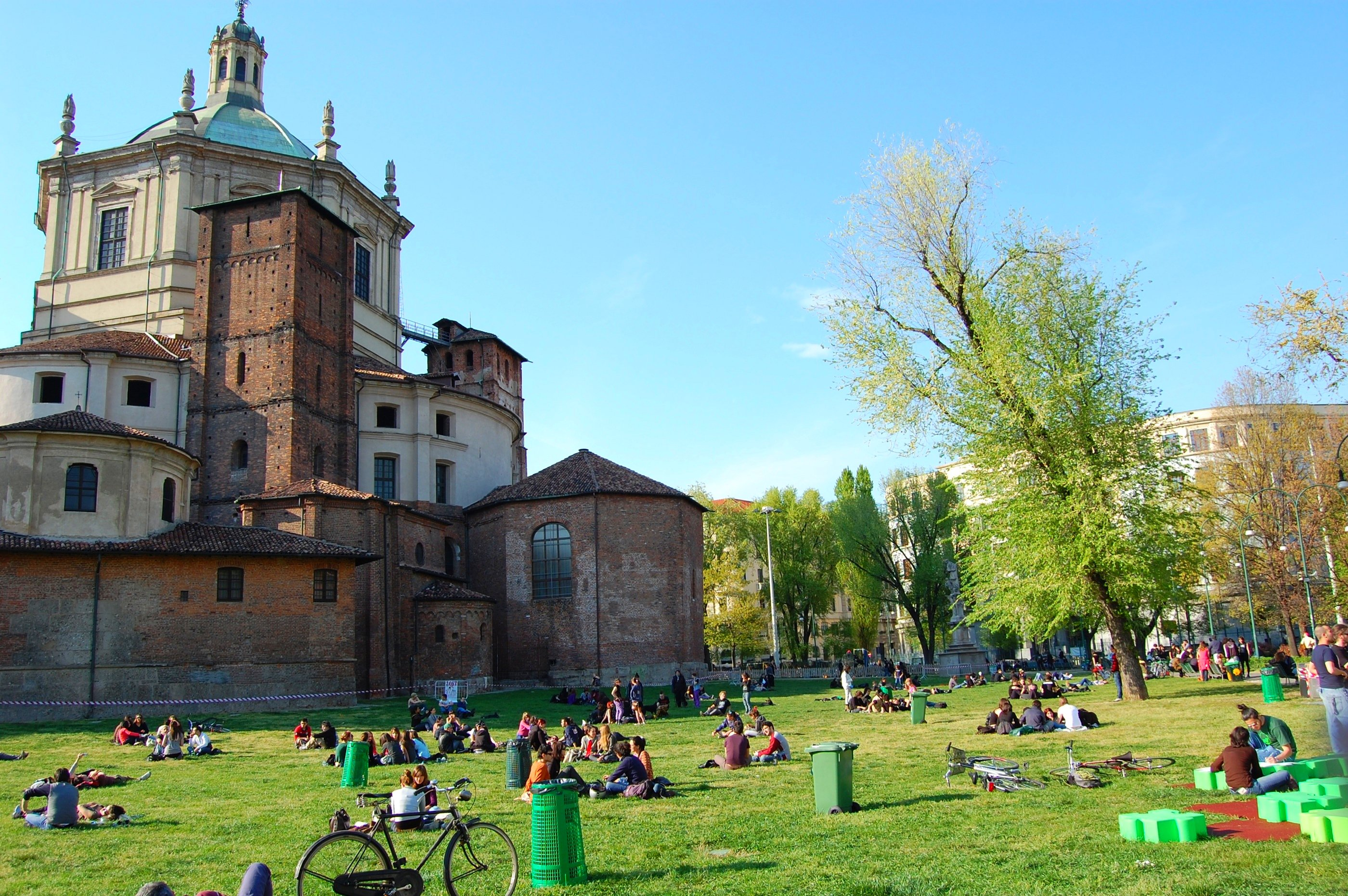
Parco delle Basiliche

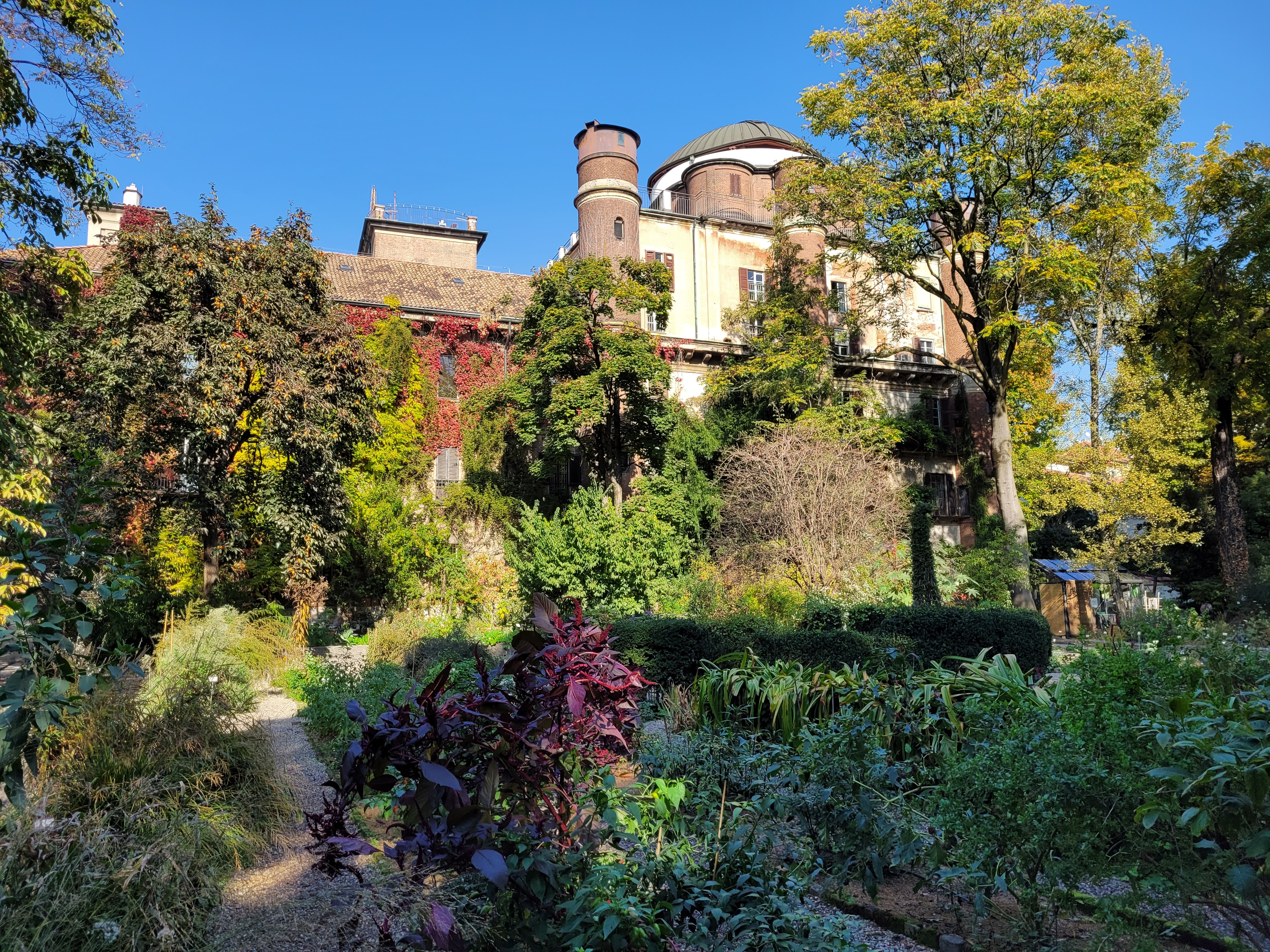
Orto Botanico di Brera

- Parco Sempione ("Simplon Park") is a large city park in the historic center of Milan. Established in 1888, and designed by Emilio Alemagna, it has an overall area of 38.6 hectares (95 acres), and it is located inside the Zone 1 administrative division. The vaguely polygonal park is anchored to the southeast by grounds of the Sforza Castle and a linear axis leads in the northwest to the Arch of Peace. The perpendicular axis to these two landmarks is flanked on the northeast by the oval Arena Civica and in the southwest by the Palazzo dell'Arte ("Palace of Art"), built in 1933 to house the Fifth Triennale di Milano art and design exposition, and now a permanent museum, theater, and exhibition hall. Contemporary and near the Palazzo dell'Arte is the steel tower-spire Torre Branca, designed in 1933 by Gio Ponti as Tower Littoria (Lictor's Tower). Near the Arena, stands the public aquarium.
- Giardini Pubblici Indro Montanelli ("Indro Montanelli Public Gardens"), formerly known as Giardini Pubblici and Giardini di Porta Venezia (and renamed after journalist and writer Indro Montanelli in 2002) are a major and historic city park in Milan, located in the Porta Venezia district, north-east of the city center, in the Zone 1 administrative division. Established in 1784, they are the oldest city park in Milan. After their establishment, the Gardens have been repeatedly enlarged (to the current overall area of 172,000 square metres (43 acres) and enriched with notable buildings, most notably the Natural History Museum (1888–1893) and the Planetarium (1930).
- Parco Papa Giovanni Paolo II ("Pope John Paul II Park"), best known by its historic name Parco delle Basiliche ("Basilicas Park") is a city park of Milan, located in Zone 1. It owes its name to the fact that it connects two major basilicas, the Basilica of San Lorenzo and the Basilica of Sant'Eustorgio. The park has an overall area of 40.700 m^{2}, bisected by Via Molino delle Armi, one of the avenues comprising the Cerchia dei Navigli ring road (this was originally intended to be adapted into an underpass, but the plan was never implemented).
- The Orto Botanico di Brera (5,000 m^{2}) is a botanical garden located behind Palazzo Brera at Via Brera 28 in the center of Milan, and operated by the Istituto di Fisica Generale Applicata of the University of Milan. It is open weekdays without charge. The garden was established in 1774 by Abbot Fulgenzio Vitman under the direction of the Empress Maria Theresa of Austria, transforming an existing Jesuit garden to serve students of medicine and pharmacology. The garden was restored in 1998 after a long period of neglect and decay. Today the garden consists primarily of rectangular flower-beds, trimmed in brick, with elliptical ponds from the 18th century, and specula and greenhouse from the 19th century (now used by the Academy of Fine Arts). It contains one of the oldest Ginkgo biloba trees in Europe, as well as mature specimens of Firmiana platanifolia, Juglans nigra, Pterocarya fraxinifolia, and Tilia.
- The Orto Botanico di Cascina Rosa (about 22,000 m^{2}) is a botanical garden maintained by the University of Milan, and located at the end of Via Camillo Golgi 18, Milan. For opening days and times we recommend consulting the official website. The garden was established on disused farmland in 2002 for research and education. Its primary research facilities are three greenhouses that include a total of 10 separate compartments that support modern technology including cryopreservation, molecular testing, etc. Current research includes genetic improvement of rice, and exploration of useful genes in Arabidopsis thaliana. The garden's grounds contain many labeled plants, lawns, a lake, and about 1 km of walking paths.
- Monte Stella ("Starmount"), also informally called Montagnetta di San Siro ("Little mountain of San Siro") is an artificial hill and surrounding city park in Milan. The park, established in the 1950s, has an overall area of 370,000 m^{2}. The hill was created using the debris from the buildings that were bombed during World War II, as well as from the last remnants of the Spanish walls of the city, demolished in the mid 20th century. The hill is 45 m high; according to the original design, it should have been twice as high, but it was later redesigned to avoid damaging buildings in the nearby street Via Isernia as a consequence of side pressure. Even at only 25 m height, the hill provides a panoramic view of the city and hinterland, and in a clear day, the Alps and Apennines can be distinguished from atop. A notable area of the park is called "Giardino dei Giusti" (Garden of the Just), which is a memorial to distinguished opponents of genocide and crimes against humanity; each tree in the garden is dedicated to one such person. Notable people who have been dedicated a tree in the Giardino dei Giusti include Moshe Bejski, Andrej Sakharov, Svetlana Broz, and Pietro Kuciukian.

== Food and wine tourism ==
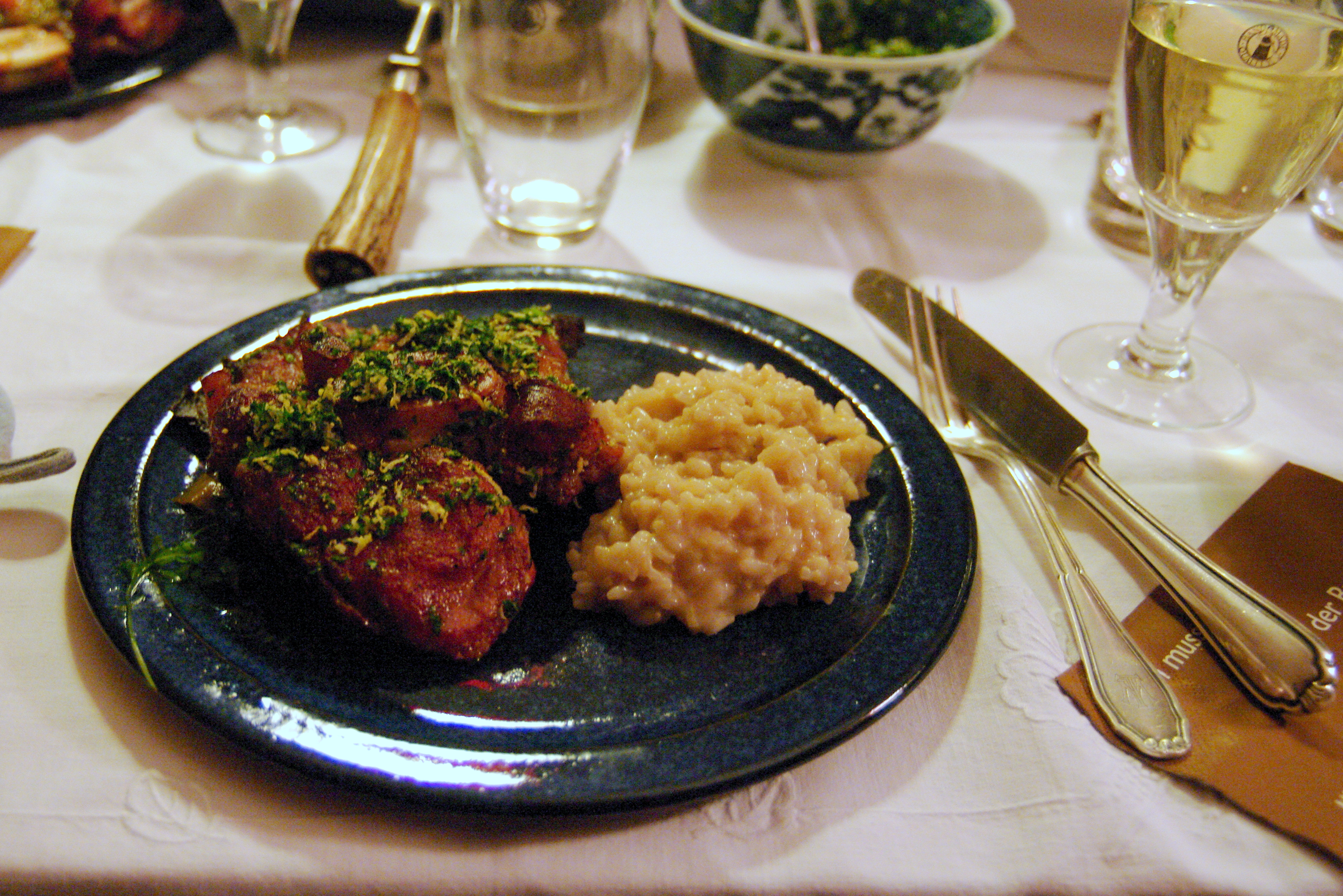
Ossobuco served with risotto alla milanese

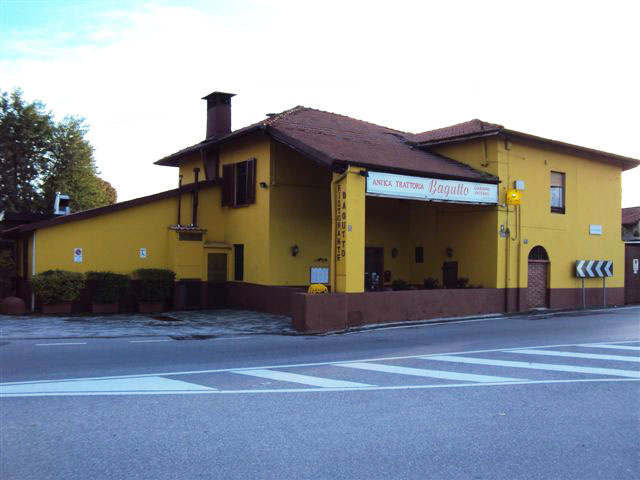
The Antica trattoria Bagutto in Milan, the oldest restaurant in Italy and the second in Europe.

Like most cities in Italy, Milan has developed its own local culinary tradition, which, as it is typical for North Italian cuisines, uses more frequently rice than pasta, butter than vegetable oil and features almost no tomato or fish. Milanese traditional dishes includes cotoletta alla milanese, a breaded veal (pork and turkey can be used) cutlet pan-fried in butter (similar to Viennese Wiener Schnitzel).

Other typical dishes are cassoeula (stewed pork rib chops and sausage with Savoy cabbage), ossobuco (braised veal shank served with a condiment called gremolata), risotto alla milanese (with saffron and beef marrow), busecca (stewed tripe with beans), mondeghili (meatballs made with leftover meat fried in butter), and brasato (stewed beef or pork with wine and potatoes).

The comune of San Colombano al Lambro, located about 40 kilometres (25 mi) southeast of Milan, is home to the Denominazione di origine controllata (DOC) wine which includes 100 hectares (250 acres) producing a single red wine. The finished wine must attain a minimum alcohol level of 11% in order to be labelled with the San Colombano DOC designation.

Season-related pastries include chiacchiere (flat fritters dusted with sugar) and tortelli (fried spherical cookies) for Carnival, colomba (glazed cake shaped as a dove) for Easter, pane dei morti ("bread of the (Day of the) Dead", cookies flavoured with cinnamon) for All Souls' Day and panettone for Christmas. The salame Milano, a salami with a very fine grain, is widespread throughout Italy. Renowned Milanese cheeses are gorgonzola (from the namesake village nearby), mascarpone, used in pastry-making, taleggio and quartirolo. Milan is home to the oldest restaurant in Italy and the second in Europe, the Antica trattoria Bagutto, which has existed since at least 1284.

== Events ==
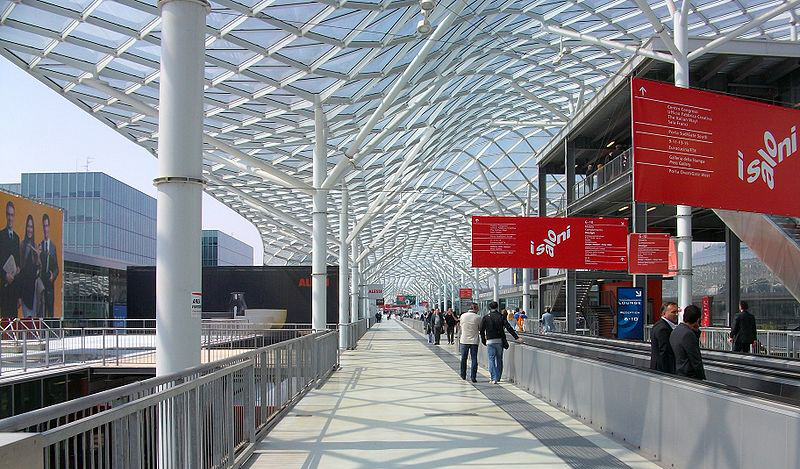
Fiera Milano, the most important trade fair organiser in Italy and the world's fourth largest

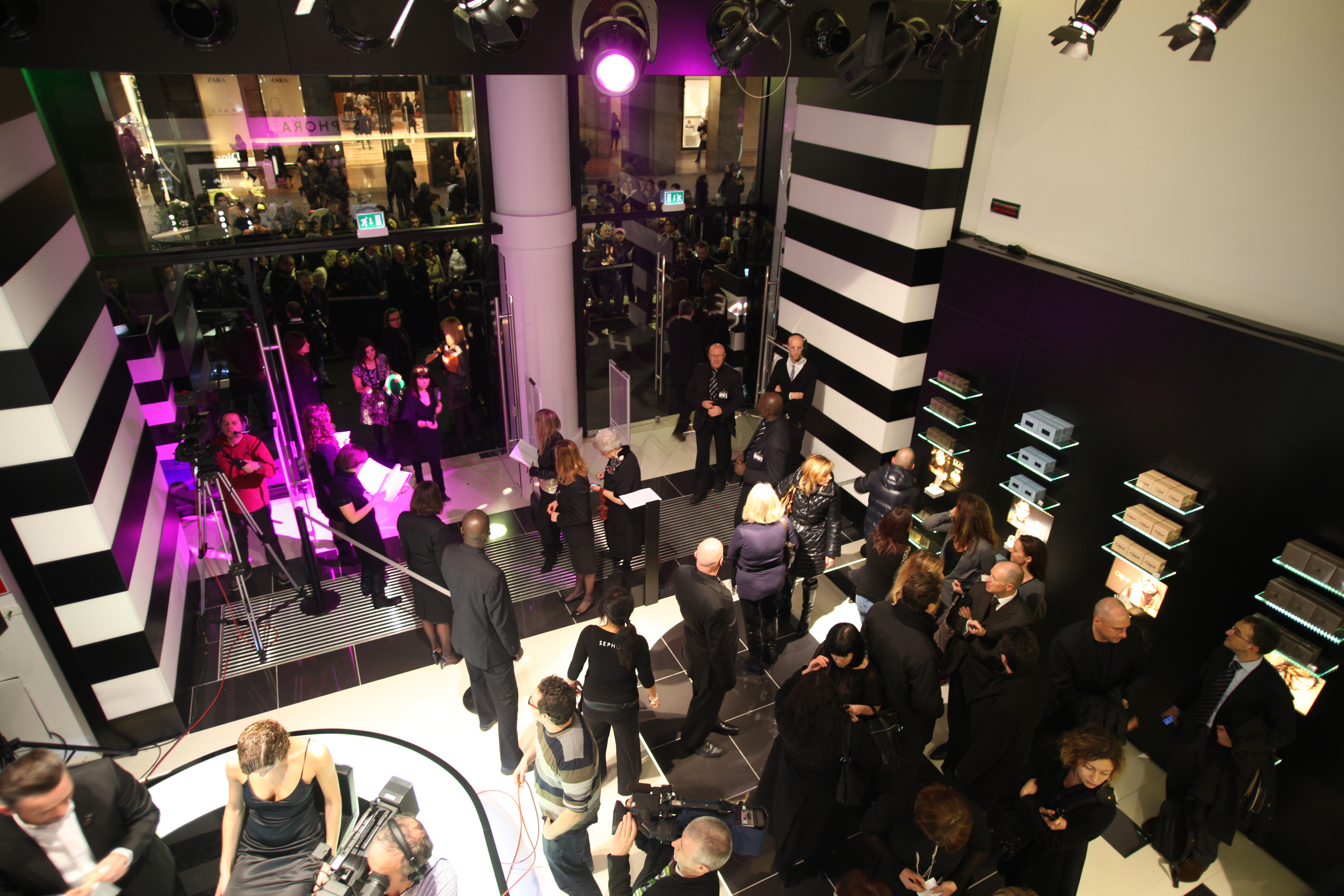
Milan Fashion Week is one of the most important clothing trade show in the world

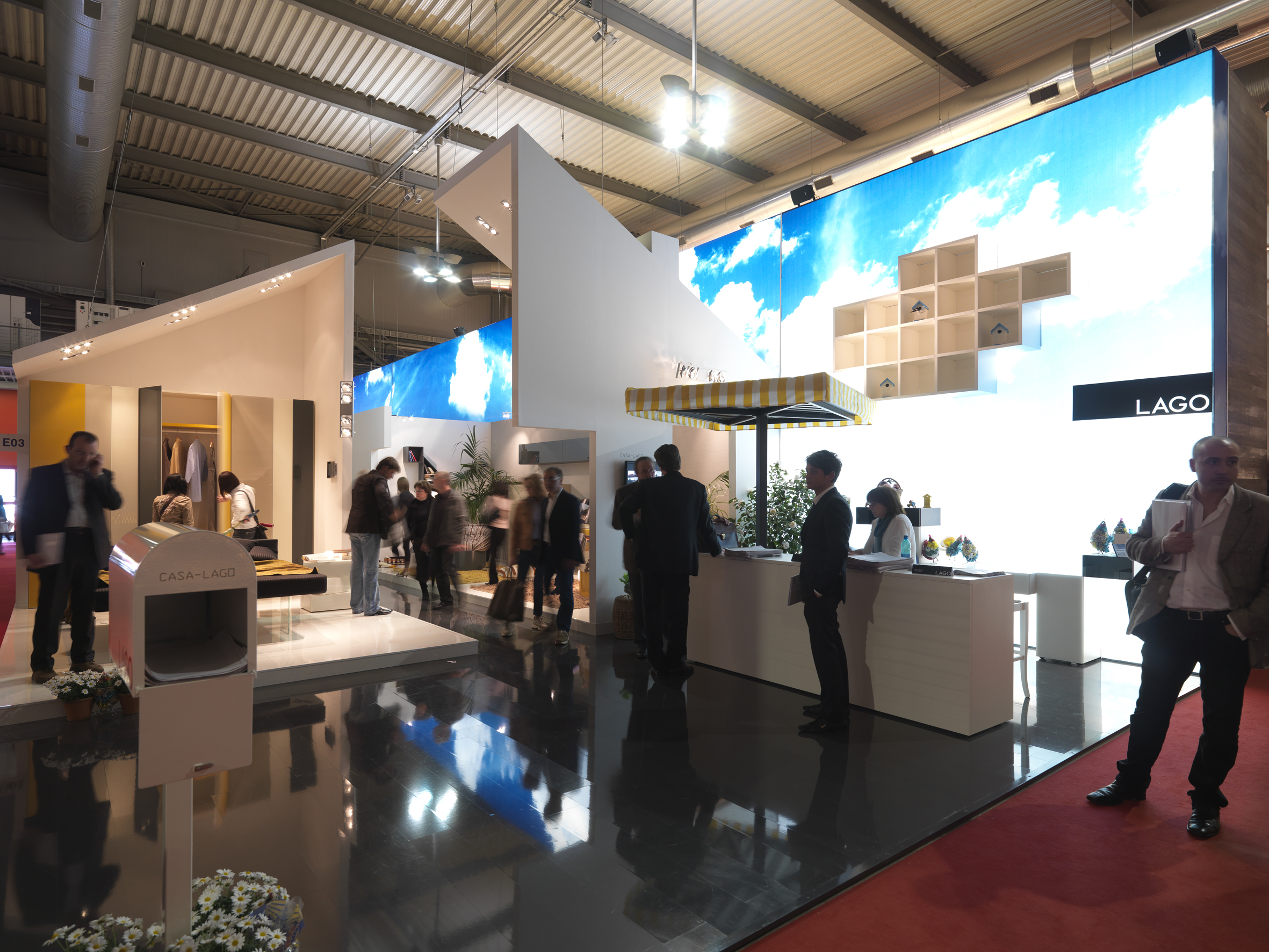
Milan Furniture Fair is the largest trade fair of its kind in the world

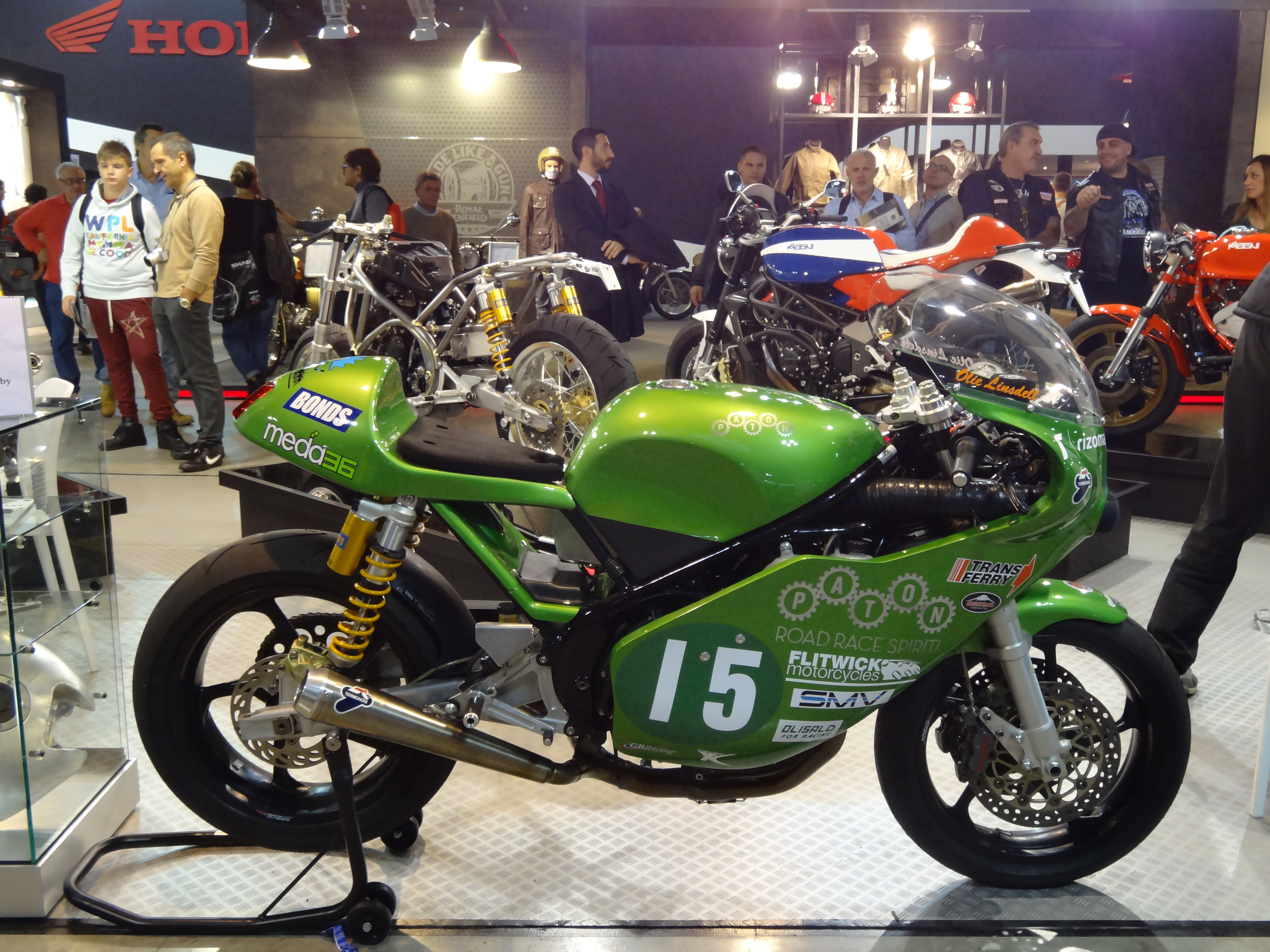
EICMA

- Fiera Milano is a trade fair and exhibition organiser headquartered in Milan. The firm is the most important trade fair organiser in Italy and the world's fourth largest. The company started operation on 1 October 2000 and has been listed on Borsa Italiana (STAR segment) since 12 December 2002. Fiera Milano mainly operates in the fields of management and organisation of exhibitions, trade fairs and conferences. It hosts about seventy shows (of which about one-third are directly organized) and 30,000 exhibitors every year.
- Milan Fashion Week is a clothing trade show held semi-annually in Milan, Italy. Upcoming autumn/winter fashions are showcased in February/March of each year, and upcoming spring/summer fashions are showcased in September/October of each year. Many designers showcase new designs and upcoming collections. It is one of the most important worldwide. Milan Fashion Week, established in 1958, is part of the global "Big Four fashion weeks", the others being Paris Fashion Week, London Fashion Week, and New York Fashion Week. The schedule begins with New York, followed by London, and then Milan, and ending with Paris. Since the year 1958, Milan Fashion Week has been taking place semi-annually with a women's and a men's fashion week.
- Milan Furniture Fair is a furniture fair held annually in Milan. It is the largest trade fair of its kind in the world. The exhibition showcases the latest in furniture and design from countries around the world. It is considered a leading venue for the display of new products by designers of furniture, lighting and other home furnishings. The show, also known as "Salone", "Milano Salone" and "Milan Design Week", is held every year, usually in April, in the FieraMilano complex in the Milan metropolitan area town of Rho. Besides the Salone, in April every odd year Euroluce exhibition takes place and every even year EuroCucina and the International Bathroom Exhibition are held along the Milan Furniture Fair.
- EICMA, or the "Milan Motorcycle Shows" is an annual trade show in Milan, Italy featuring motorcycles. The 2018 show drew over half a million visitors and more than 1,200 exhibiting brands. The show is frequently used by manufacturers to debut new models. Organised by EICMA, editions take place every year in Milan, Italy and last for six days in total. Fiera Milano Rho admits trade visitors for the first two days and then is open for the general public on the latter four days. Opening hours for trade visitors are from 08:30 on the first day and 09:00 on the second until 18:30 for both days. For the general public, opening hours start from 09:30 for all days until 18:30. The only exception is the fourth day, when closing time is at 22:00.
- Milan Triennial is an art and design exhibition that takes place every three years at the Triennale di Milano Museum in Milan, Italy. The exhibition was originally established in 1923 as a biennial architecture and industrial design event. The first five editions took place in Monza. In 1933 the exhibition was relocated to Milan and the format was changed to a triennial basis. The designated venue was the new Palazzo dell’Arte designed by architect Giovanni Muzio, featuring Gio Ponti's Torre Branca. The Triennial was recognised by the Bureau of International Expositions (BIE) in 1933.
- Oh bej! Oh bej! (pronounced [u ˈbɛj u ˈbɛj] or [ɔ ˈbɛj ɔ ˈbɛj]; in Milanese: "oh so nice! oh so nice!") is the most important and traditional Christmas fair in Milan, Italy. It is held from 7 December (day of the patron saint of Milan, Ambrose) until the following Sunday. The fair is also informally known as the Fiera di Sant'Ambrogio ("Saint Ambrose Fair"). The Oh bej! Oh bej! fair has been held in different areas of Milan; until 1886, it was located in Piazza Mercanti (in the surroundings of the Duomo); from 1886 to 2006, it was held by the Basilica di Sant'Ambrogio; in 2006, it was relocated again, to the area of the Sforza Castle. The most typical goods that are sold at Oh bej! Oh bej! are sweets and Christmas or winter delicacies, handcrafts such as Christmas decorations, toys, antiques, souvenirs, bric-a-brac, and more. The fair is usually very crowded; this is partly because, as Saint Ambrose Day is immediately followed by the Immaculate Conception Day (an Italian national holiday), and this in turn might be followed by a week-end, Milanese usually have several free days in the fair's days.

== Hotels and restaurants ==
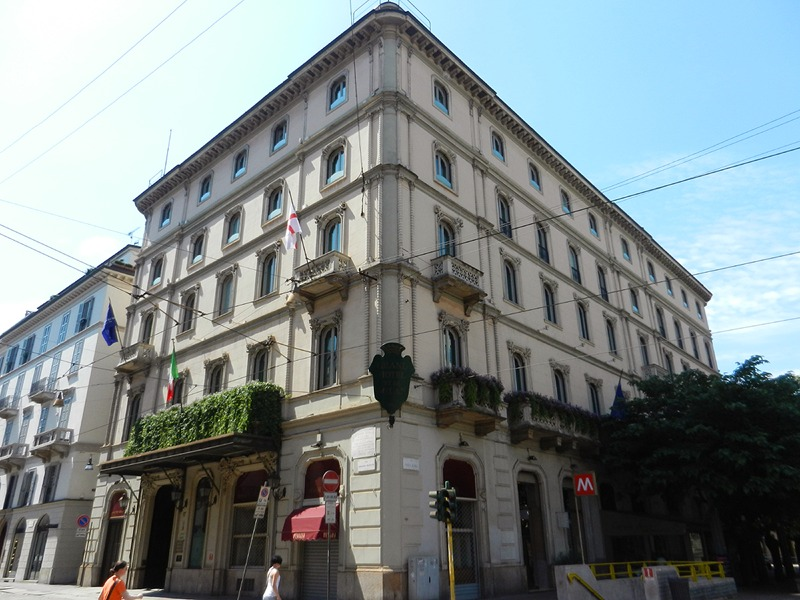
Grand Hotel et de Milan, founded in 1863

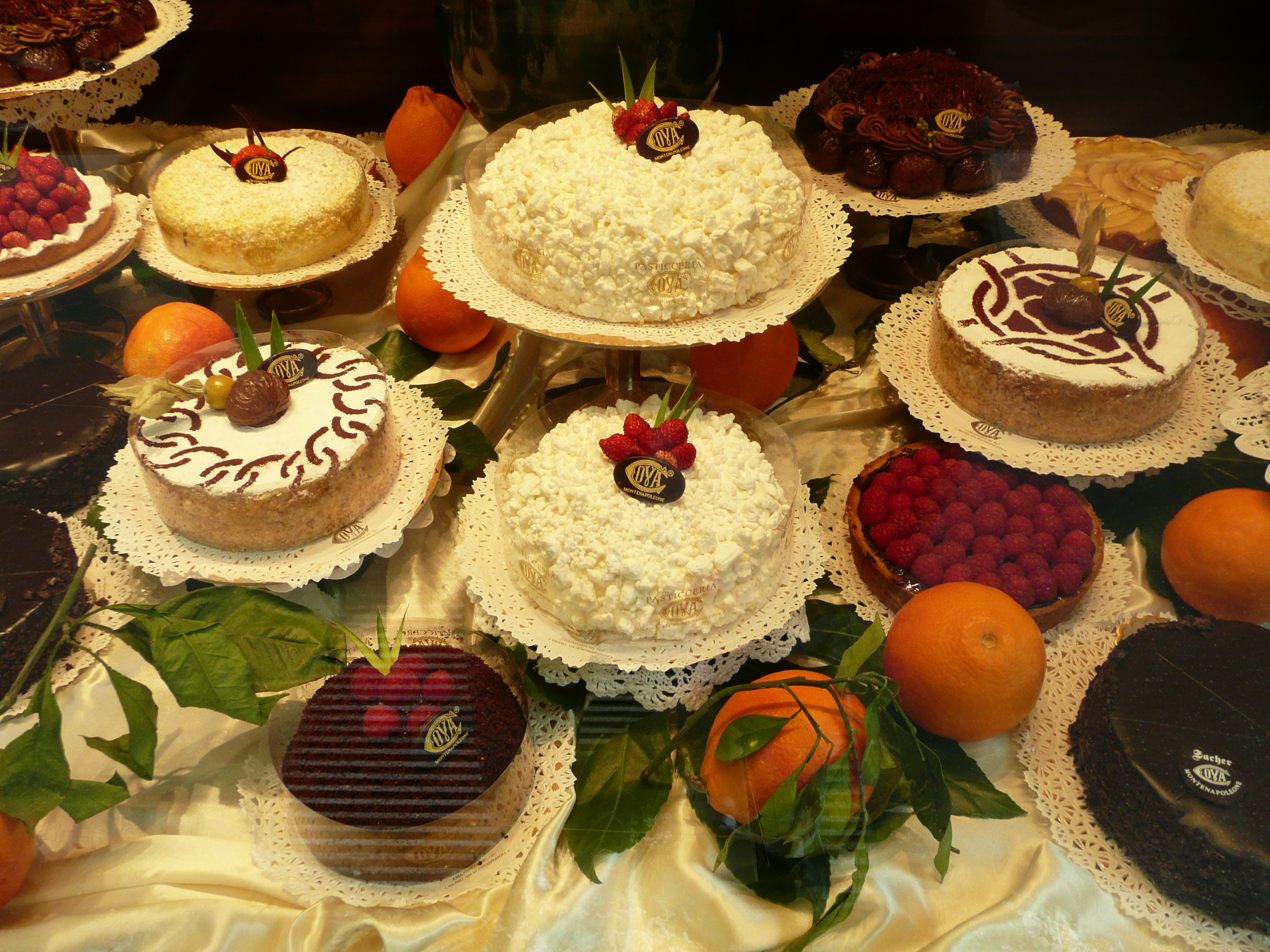
Traditional Milanese cakes on display at the Caffè-Pasticceria Cova, founded in 1817

The city also has numerous hotels, including luxurious such as Principe di Savoia, Grand Hotel et de Milan and the 7 star Town House Galleria. The average stay for a tourist in the city is of 3.43 nights, while foreigners stay for longer periods of time, 77% of which stay for a 2-5 night average. Of the 75% of visitors who stay in hotels, 4-star ones are the most popular (47%), while the ones which have 5-stars, or less than 3-stars represent 11% and 15% of the charts respectively. Visitors to the city, by average, find that accommodation is good, high-quality and that service is professional, however that it is also very expensive.

In addition to a unique cuisine, Milan is well known for its world-class restaurants and cafés, characterised by innovative cuisine and design. As of 2014, Milan has 157 Michelin-selected places, including three 2-Michelin-starred restaurants; these include Cracco, Sadler and il Luogo di Aimo e Nadia. Many historical restaurants and bars are found in the historic centre, the Brera and Navigli districts. One of the city's oldest surviving cafés, Caffè Cova, was established in 1817. Caffè Cova has also opened franchises in Hong Kong. In total, Milan has 15 cafés, bars and restaurants registered among the Historical Places of Italy, continuously operating for at least 70 years.

Most of the more refined and upper-class restaurants are found in the historic centre, while the more traditional and popular ones are mainly located in the Brera and Navigli districts. Today, there is also a Nobu Japanese restaurant in Milan, which is located in Armani World in Via Manzoni and is regarded as being one of the trendiest restaurants in the city.

The Biffi Caffè and the Zucca in Galleria are also famous and historical ‘Caffès’ which are situated in Milan. Other restaurants in Milan include the Hotel Four Seasons restaurant, ‘La Briciola’, the Marino alla Scala and the Chandelier. Today, there are some new boutique-cafés, such as the Just Cavalli Café, owned by the luxury fashion goods brand Roberto Cavalli and the Armani Café in via Manzoni, owned by the homonymous fashion entrepreneur Giorgio Armani.

=== Hotel tax ===
Like other Italian and world cities, Milan charges a hotel tax. It ranges from €2 to €5 per person, per night, based on the hotel or other type of accommodation used.

== Transport ==
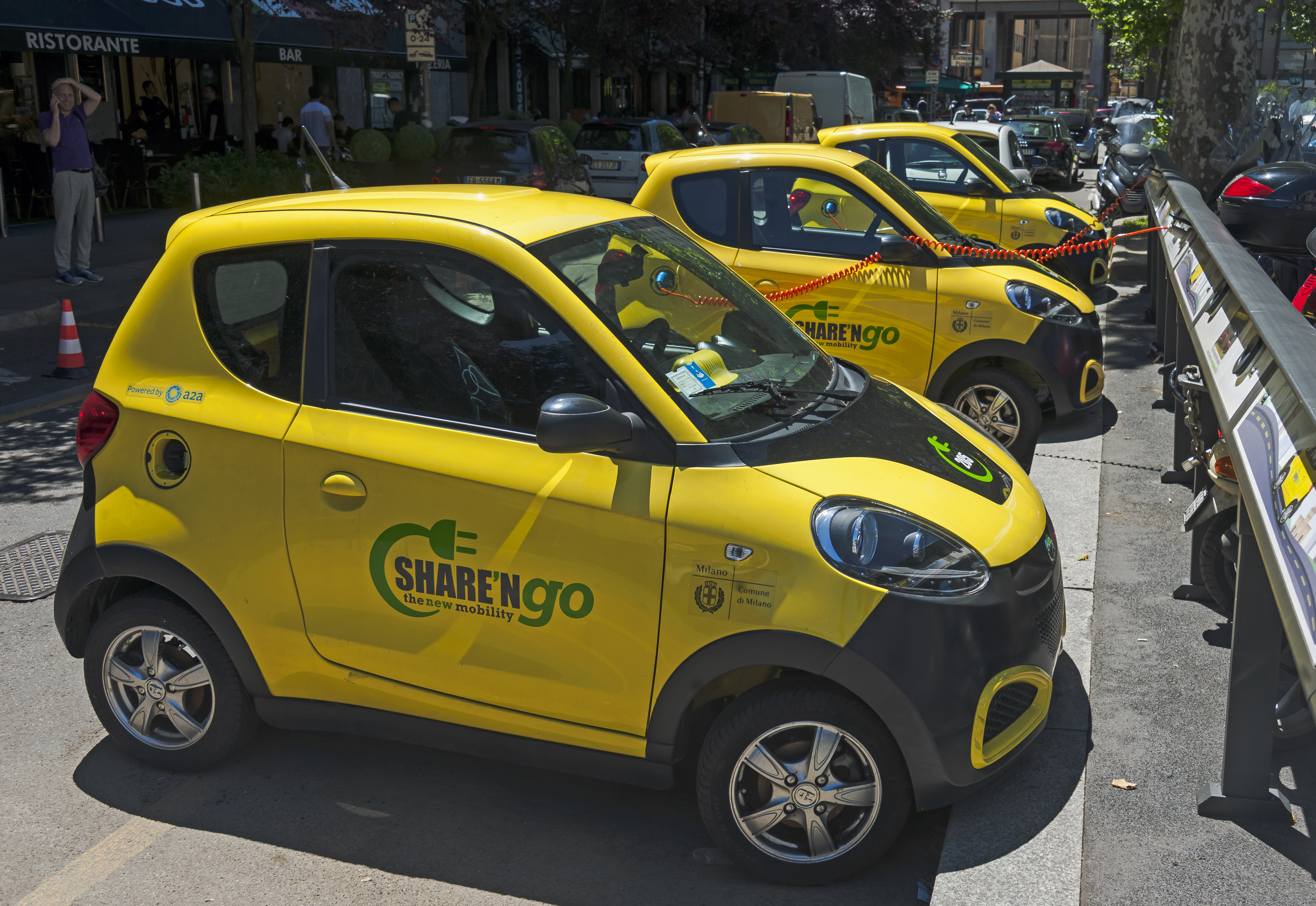
Carsharing cars in Piazza Duca d'Aosta

Milan is one of the key transport nodes of Italy and southern Europe. Its central railway station is Italy's second, after Rome Termini railway station, and Europe's eighth busiest. The Malpensa, Linate and Orio al Serio airports serve the Greater Milan, the largest metropolitan area in Italy.

Azienda Trasporti Milanesi (ATM) is the Milanese municipal transport company; it operates 5 metro lines, 18 tram lines, 131 bus lines, 4 trolleybus lines, and 1 people mover line, carrying about 776 million passengers in 2018. Overall the network covers nearly 1,500 km (932 mi) reaching 46 municipalities. Besides public transport, ATM manages the interchange parking lots and other transport services including bike sharing and carsharing systems.

=== Rail ===
==== Underground ====
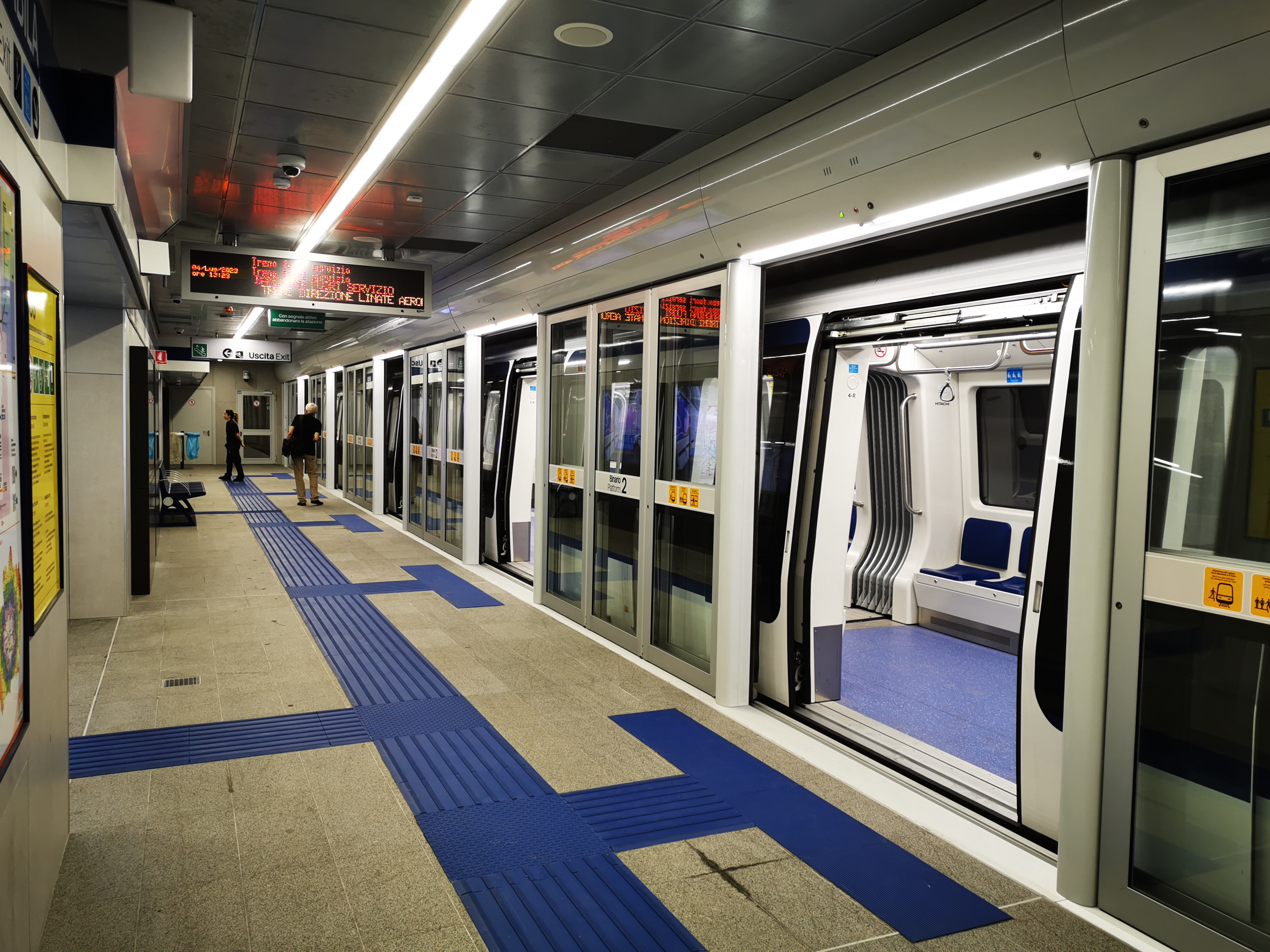
Milan Metro is the largest rapid transit system in Italy in terms of length, number of stations and ridership; and the fifth longest in the European Union and the eighth in the Europe.

The Milan Metro is the rapid transit system serving the city and surrounding municipalities. The network consists of 5 lines (M1, M2, M3, M4 and M5), with a total network length of 104 kilometres (65 mi), and a total of 121 stations, mostly underground. It has a daily ridership of 1.15 million, the largest in Italy as well as one of the largest in Europe.

==== Suburban ====
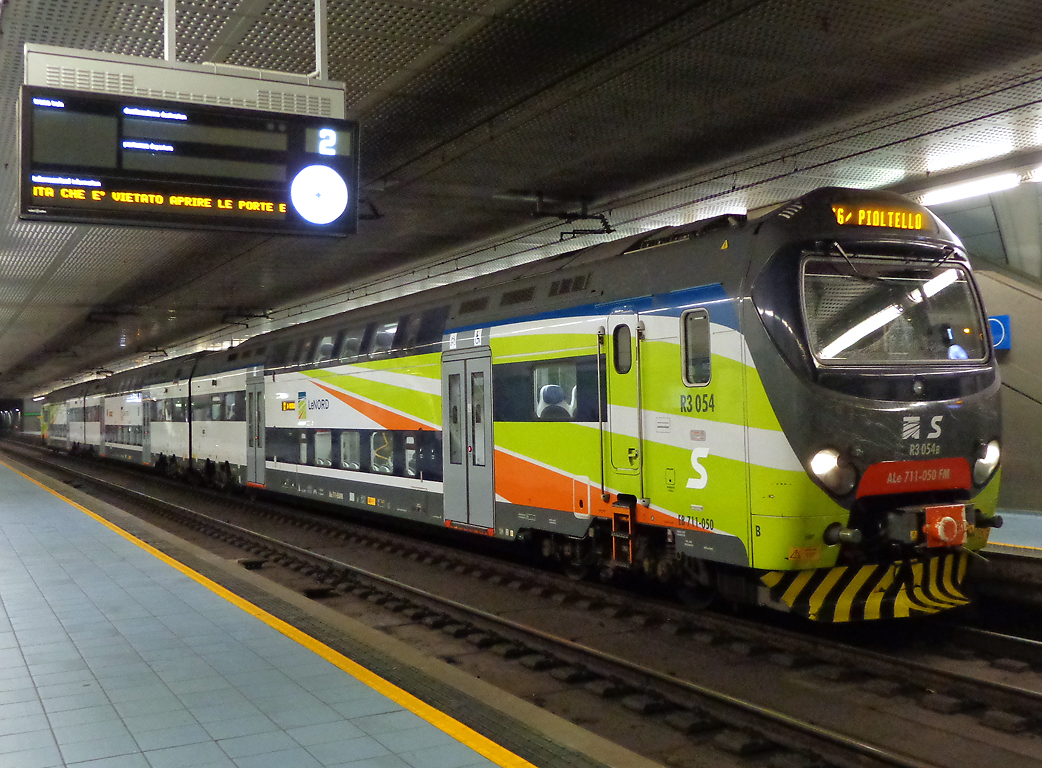
A TSR train at Milano Porta Venezia railway station on the Milan Passerby railway

As of May 2023, the Milan suburban railway service, operated by Trenord, comprises 11 S lines connecting the metropolitan area with the city centre, with possible transfers to all the metro lines. Most S lines run through the Milan Passerby railway, commonly referred to as "il Passante" and served by double-decker trains every 4/8 minutes in the central underground section.

==== National and international trains ====
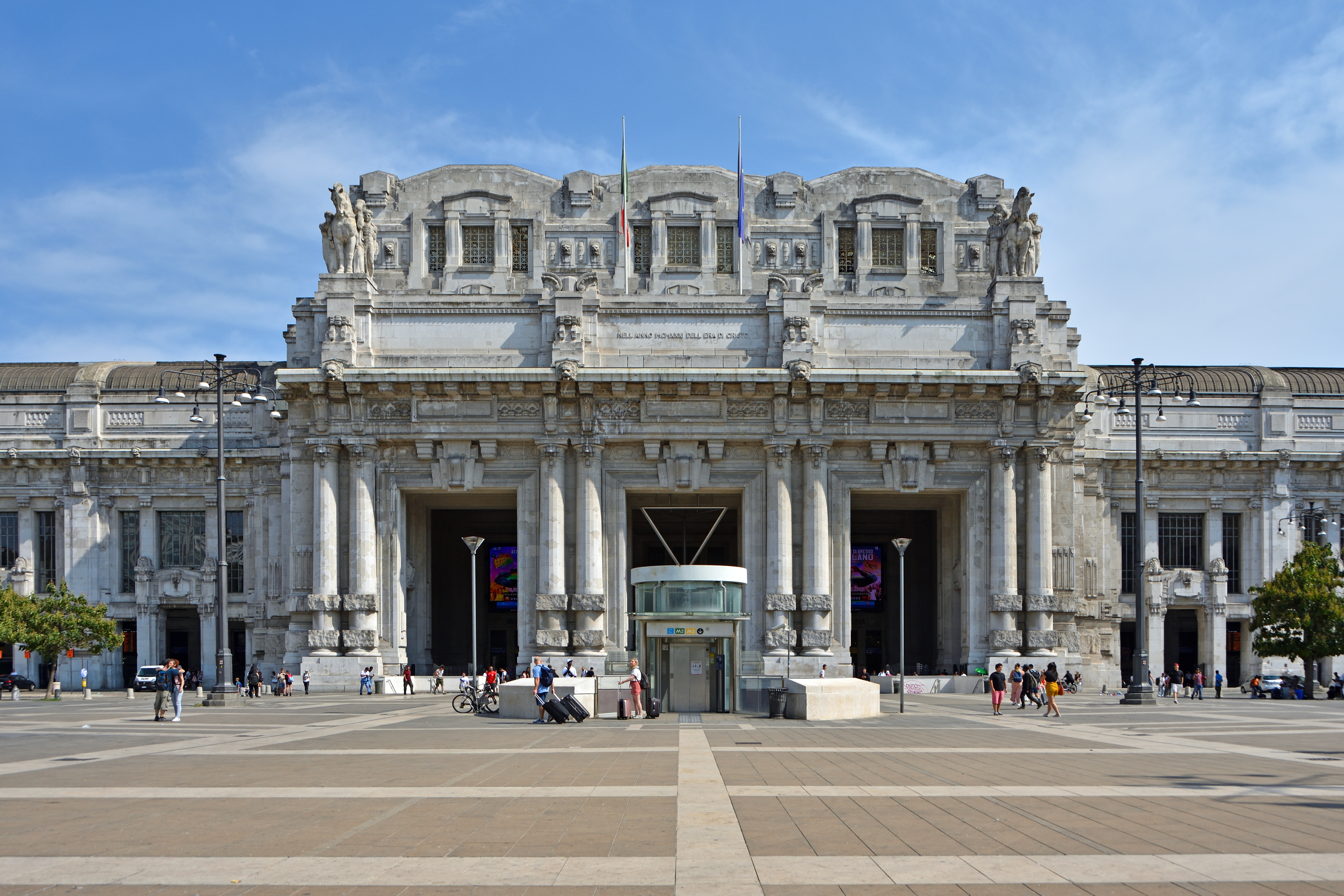
Milano Centrale railway station

Milan Central station, with 110 million passengers per year, is the largest and eighth busiest railway station in Europe and the second busiest in Italy after Roma Termini. Milano Centrale railway station is the largest railway station in Europe by volume. Milano Cadorna and Milano Porta Garibaldi stations are respectively the seventh and the eleventh busiest stations in Italy. Since the end of 2009, two high-speed train lines link Milan to Rome, Naples and Turin, considerably shortening travel times with other major cities in Italy. Further high-speed lines are under construction towards Genoa and Verona. Milan is served by direct international trains to Nice, Marseille, Lyon, Paris, Lugano, Geneva, Bern, Basel, Zurich and Frankfurt, and by overnight sleeper services to Munich and Vienna (ÖBB). Overnight services to Paris were suspended in 2020 following the COVID lockdown and subsequently discontinued.

Milan is also the core of Lombardy's regional train network. Regional trains were operated on two different systems by LeNord (departing from Milano Cadorna) and Trenitalia (departing from Milan Centrale and Milano Porta Garibaldi). Since 2011, a new company, Trenord, has operated both Trenitalia and LeNord regional trains in Lombardy, carrying over 750,000 passengers on more than 50 routes every day.

=== Buses and trams ===
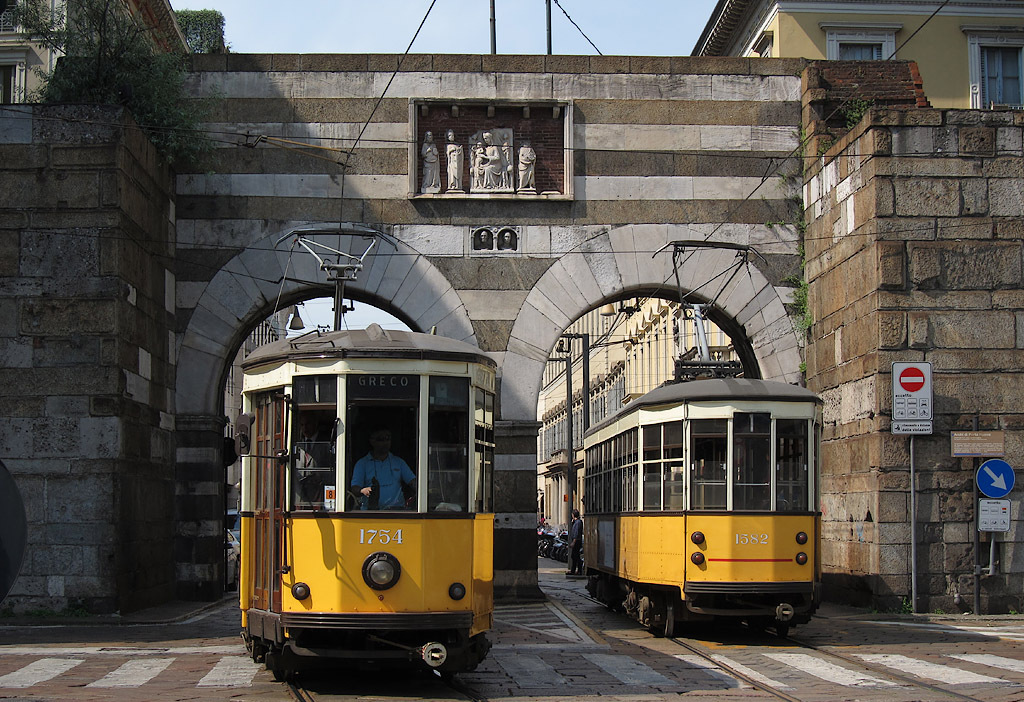
Intersecting trams under the arcs of Porta Nuova medieval gate. This type of historical trams is also used in San Francisco, United States

The city tram network consists of approximately 160 kilometres (99 mi) of track and 18 lines, and is Europe's most advanced light rail system. Bus lines cover over 1,070 km (665 mi). Milan has also taxi services operated by private companies and licensed by the City Council of Milan. The city is also a key node for the national road network, being served by all the major highways of Northern Italy. Numerous long-distance bus lines link Milan with many other cities and towns in Lombardy and throughout Italy.

=== Airports ===
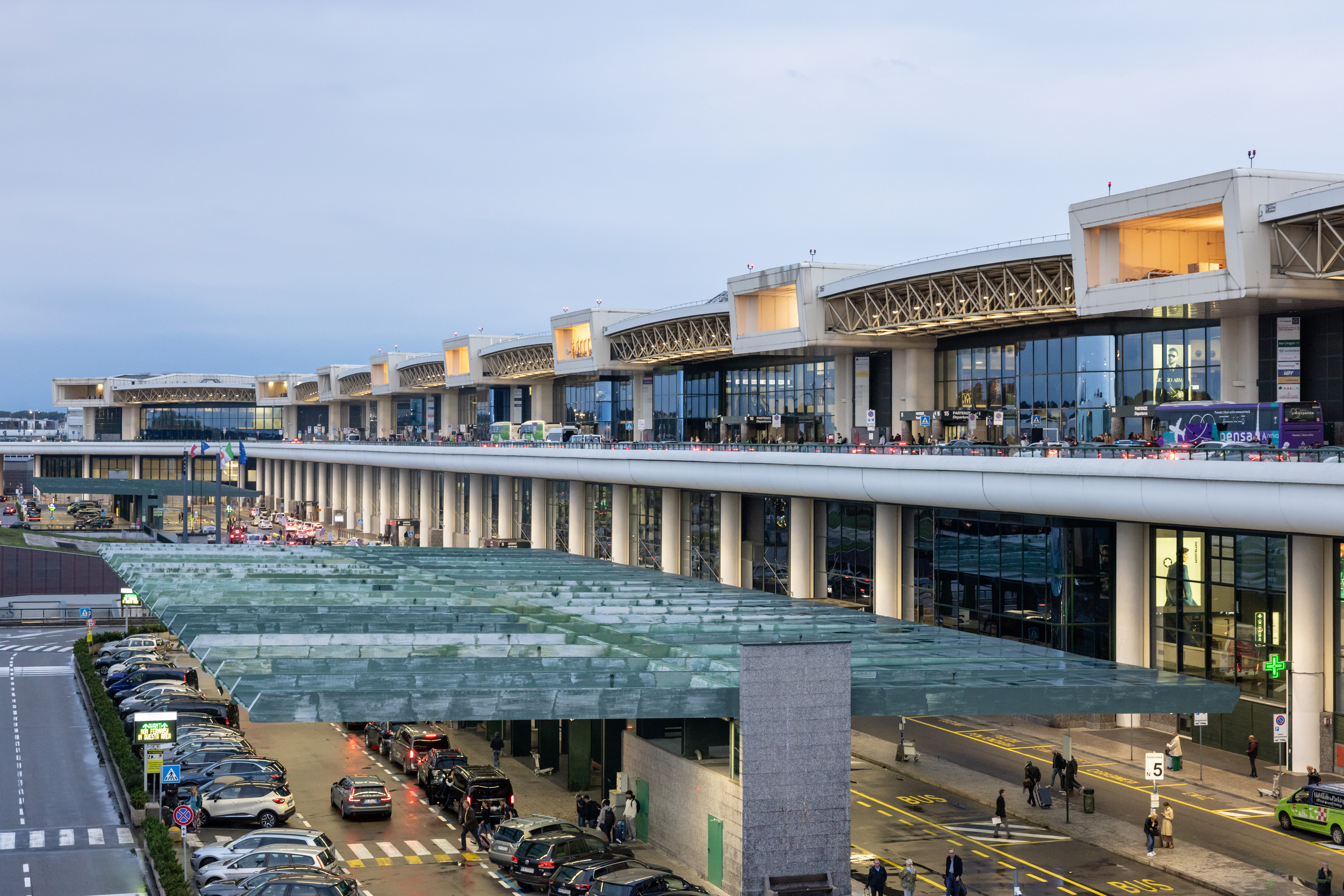
Milan Malpensa Airport

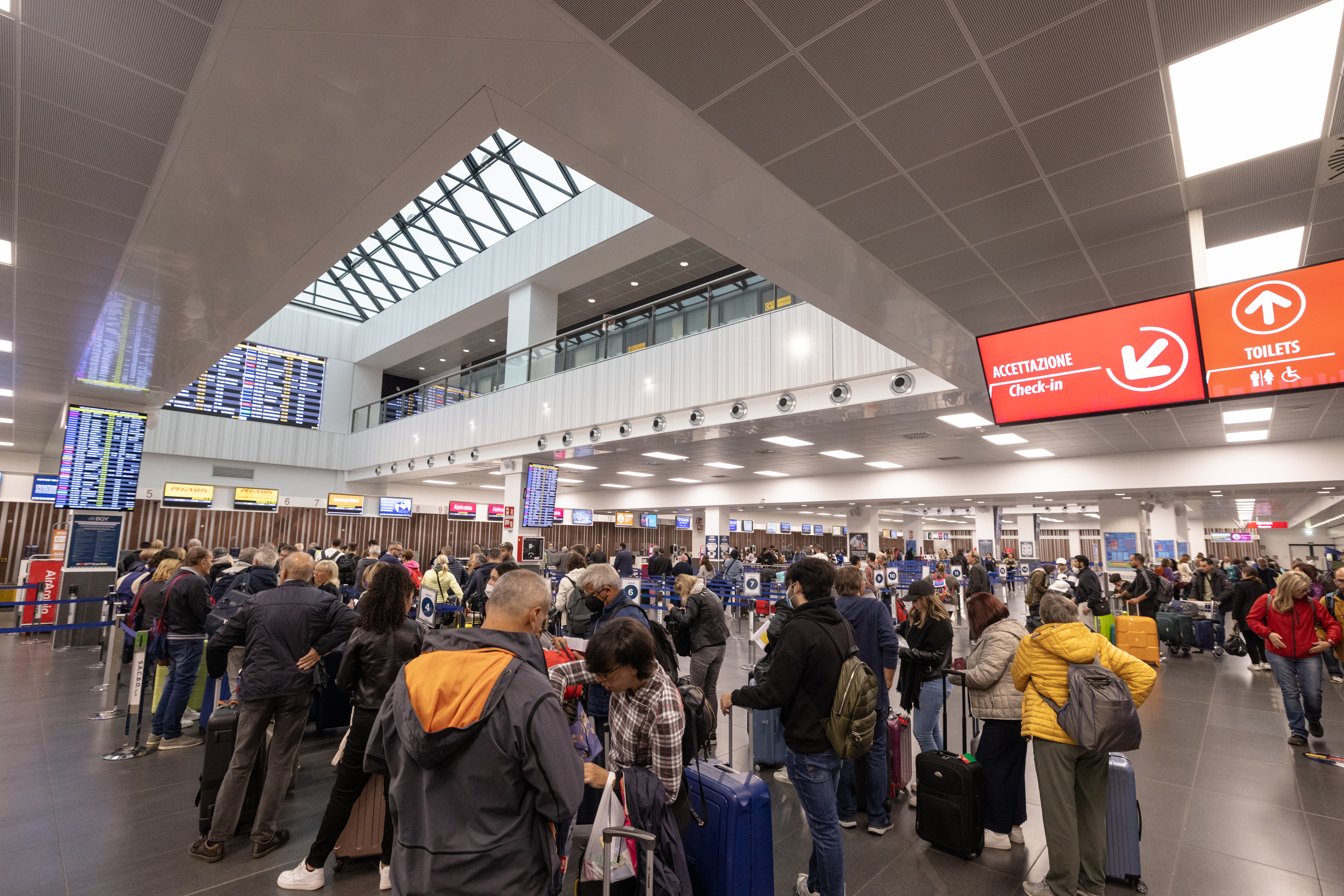
Departures area of the Milan Bergamo Airport

In the surroundings of Milan there are three airports dedicated to normal civilian traffic (Milan Malpensa Airport and Milan Linate Airport, managed by SEA, and Milan Bergamo Airport by SACBO).

Overall, the Milan airport system handles traffic of over 51.4 million passengers and around 700,000 tons of goods every year and is the first in Italy in terms of passenger volume and cargo volume (the second Italian airport system is Rome with 44.4 million passengers in 2023). The Milan Malpensa airport, with over 700 thousand tons, confirms the national leadership, processing 70% of the country's air cargo.

- The intercontinental hub of Milan Malpensa Airport (MXP) is Italy's second-busiest airport, after Rome Fiumicino Airport, with 24.1 million passengers served in 2023 and Italy's busiest for freight and cargo, handling about 700,000 tons of international freight in 2022. Malpensa Airport is the largest international airport in northern Italy, serving Lombardy, Piedmont and Liguria, as well as the Swiss Canton of Ticino. The airport is located 49 kilometres (30 mi) northwest of Milan, in the province of Varese next to the Ticino river dividing Lombardy and Piedmont. Malpensa airport is 9th in the world and 6th in Europe for the number of countries served with direct scheduled flights It is connected to Milan by the Malpensa Express railway service and by various bus lines. The airport is located inside the Parco naturale lombardo della Valle del Ticino, a nature reserve included by UNESCO in the World Network of Biosphere Reserves.
- Milan Linate Airport (LIN) is Milan's city airport, less than 8 kilometres (5.0 mi) from central Milan, and is mainly used for domestic and short-haul international flights. It served 8.6 million passengers in 2023 ranking as the 8th airport in Italy for passenger traffic. Linate Airport is hub of ITA Airways together with Rome Fiumicino Airport and is connected the centre of Milan via the M4 blue metro line.
- Milan Bergamo Airport (BGY) is mainly used for low-cost, charter and cargo flights. The airport is located in Orio al Serio, 3.7 km (2.3 mi) southeast of Bergamo and 45 km (28 mi) northeast of Milan. It is one of Ryanair's three main operating bases, along with Dublin Airport and London Stansted Airport. It served 14.7 million passengers in 2023. A bus service operated by ATB connects to the airport, about 10 minutes from the Bergamo railway station.

Lastly, Bresso Airfield is a general aviation airport, operated by Aero Club Milano. Since 1960 the airport mostly serves as a general aviation airfield for flying club activity, touristic flights and air taxi. It also hosts a base of the state helicopter emergency service Elisoccorso.

=== Cycling ===
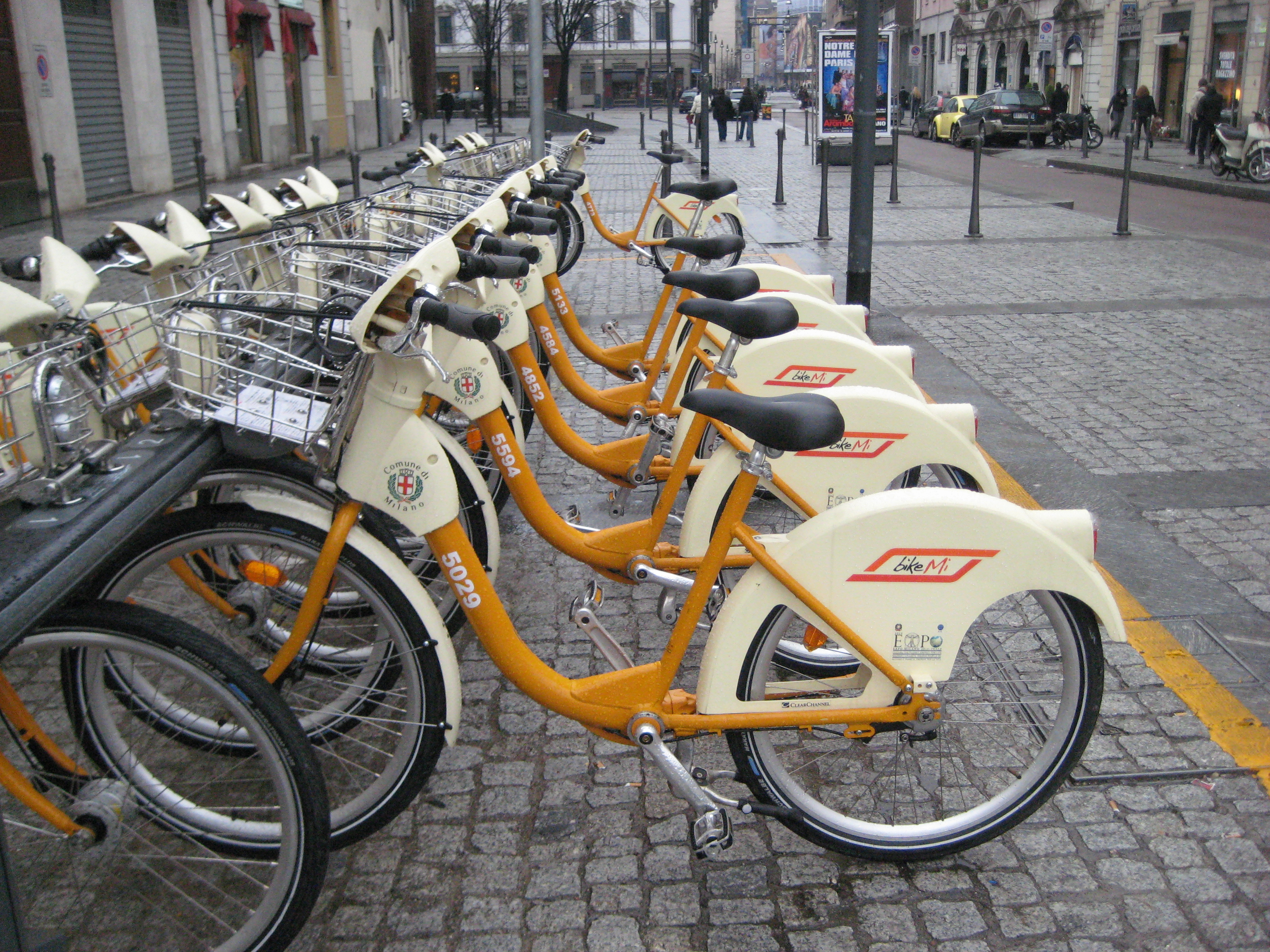
BikeMi station and bikes along Corso Garibaldi.

The bicycle is becoming an increasingly important mode of transportation in Milan. Since 2008, the implementation of a city-wide network of bike paths has been initiated, to fight congestion and air pollution. During the COVID pandemic in 2019, 35 km of bike lanes were realized on short notice, to relieve pressure on the subway occupation.

The bike sharing system BikeMi has been deployed in almost all the city and enjoys increasing popularity. Stationless commercial bike and scooter sharing systems are widely available.

== See also ==
- Economy of Milan
- History of Milan
- History of architecture and art in Milan
- Milan
- Tourism in Italy
