= Outline of Milan =

Overview of and topical guide to Milan

Flag of Milan

Coat of arms of Milan

The following outline is provided as an overview of and topical guide to Milan:

Milan – capital of Lombardy and the second most populous city in Italy after Rome. Milan is considered a leading Alpha Global City, with strengths in the arts, commerce, design, education, entertainment, fashion, finance, healthcare, media, services, research, and tourism. The city has long been named a fashion capital of the world and a world's design capital, thanks to several international events and fairs, including Milan Fashion Week and the Milan Furniture Fair, which are currently among the world's biggest in terms of revenue, visitors and growth. Milan is the destination of 8 million overseas visitors every year, attracted by its museums and art galleries that boast some of the most important collections in the world, including major works by Leonardo da Vinci.

== General reference ==
- Pronunciation: /mɪˈlæn/ mil-AN, US also /mɪˈlɑːn/ mil-AHN; Italian: Milano [miˈlaːno]; Milanese: Milan [miˈlãː]
- Common English name(s): Milan
- Official English name(s): City of Milan
- Adjectival(s): Milanese
- Demonym(s): Milanese

== Geography of Milan ==
Geography of Milan

- Milan is:
  - a city
    - the capital of Lombardy
- Population of Milan: 1,357,599
- Area of Milan:
- Atlas of Milan

=== Location of Milan ===
Milan (Italy)
- Milan is situated within the following regions:
  - Northern Hemisphere and Eastern Hemisphere
  - Eurasia
    - Europe (outline)
      - Western Europe
      - Southern Europe
        - Italian Peninsula
          - Italy (outline)
            - Northern Italy
              - Lombardy
                - Milan metropolitan area (a.k.a. Greater Milan)
                  - Metropolitan City of Milan
- Time zone(s): Central European Time (UTC+01), Central European Summer Time (UTC+02)

=== Environment of Milan ===
- Climate of Milan

=== Areas of Milan ===
The nine zones of Milan

==== Zones of Milan ====
Zones of Milan

- Zone 1 of Milan
- Zone 2 of Milan
- Zone 3 of Milan
- Zone 4 of Milan
- Zone 5 of Milan
- Zone 6 of Milan
- Zone 7 of Milan
- Zone 8 of Milan
- Zone 9 of Milan

==== Districts of Milan ====
The districts of Milan, by zone:

- Districts of Zone 1
  - Brera
  - Conca del Naviglio
  - Guastalla
  - Porta Sempione
  - Porta Tenaglia
- Districts of Zone 2
  - Adriano
  - Crescenzago
  - Gorla
  - Greco
  - Loreto
  - Maggiolina
  - Mandello
  - Mirabello
  - Ponte Seveso
  - Porta Nuova
  - Precotto
  - Stazione Centrale
  - Turro
  - Villaggio dei Giornalisti
- Districts of Zone 3
  - Casoretto
  - Cimiano
  - Città Studi
  - Dosso
  - Lambrate
  - Ortica
  - Porta Monforte
  - Porta Venezia
  - Quartiere Feltre
  - Rottole

- Districts of Zone 4
  - Acquabella
  - Calvairate
  - Castagnedo
  - Cavriano
  - Forlanini
  - Gamboloita
  - La Trecca
  - Monluè
  - Morsenchio
  - Nosedo
  - Omero
  - Ponte Lambro
  - Porta Vittoria
  - Porta Romana
  - Rogoredo
  - San Luigi
  - Santa Giulia
  - Taliedo
  - Triulzo Superiore
- Districts of Zone 5
  - Basmetto
  - Cantalupa
  - Case Nuove
  - Chiaravalle
  - Chiesa Rossa
  - Conca Fallata
  - Fatima
  - Gratosoglio
  - Le Terrazze
  - Macconago
  - Missaglia
  - Morivione
  - Porta Lodovica
  - Porta Vigentina
  - Quintosole
  - Ronchetto delle Rane
  - San Gottardo
  - Selvanesco
  - Stadera
  - Torretta
  - Vaiano Valle
  - Vigentino
- Districts of Zone 6
  - Arzaga
  - Barona
  - Boffalora
  - Cascina Bianca
  - Conchetta
  - Creta
  - Foppette
  - Giambellino-Lorenteggio
  - Lodovico il Moro
  - Moncucco
  - Porta Genova
  - Porta Ticinese
  - Ronchetto sul Naviglio
  - San Cristoforo
  - Sant'Ambrogio
  - Teramo
  - Villa Magentino
  - Villaggio dei Fiori

- Districts of Zone 7
  - Assiano
  - Baggio
  - Figino
  - Fopponino
  - Forze Armate
  - Harar
  - La Maddalena
  - Muggiano
  - Porta Magenta
  - Quartiere degli Olmi
  - Quarto Cagnino
  - Quinto Romano
  - San Siro
  - Valsesia
  - Vercellese
- Districts of Zone 8
  - Boldinasco
  - Bullona
  - Cagnola
  - Campo dei Fiori
  - Cascina Triulza
  - Comina
  - Fiera
  - Gallaratese
  - Garegnano
  - Ghisolfa
  - Lampugnano
  - Musocco
  - Porta Volta
  - Portello
  - Quarto Oggiaro
  - QT8
  - Roserio
  - San Leonardo
  - Trenno
  - Varesina
  - Vialba
  - Villapizzone
- Districts of Zone 9
  - Affori
  - Bicocca
  - Bovisa
  - Bovisasca
  - Bruzzano
  - Ca' Granda
  - Centro Direzionale
  - Comasina
  - Dergano
  - Fulvio Testi
  - Isola
  - La Fontana
  - Montalbino
  - Niguarda
  - Porta Garibaldi
  - Porta Nuova
  - Prato Centenaro
  - Segnano

=== Locations in Milan ===
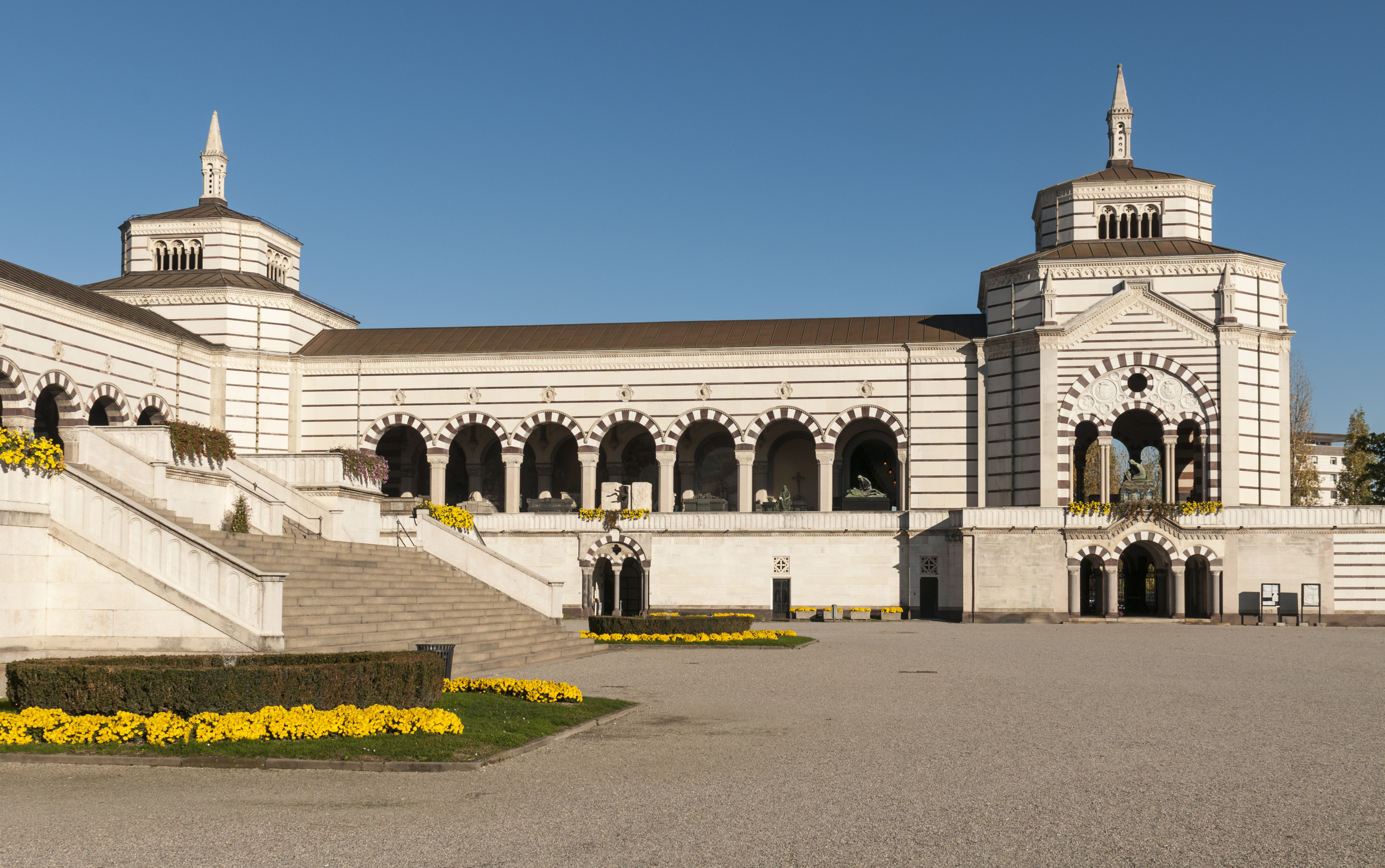
Cimitero Monumentale di Milano

- 10 Corso Como
- Biblioteca Ambrosiana
- Biblioteca di Brera
- Cimitero Monumentale di Milano
- Milan amphitheatre
- Planetario di Milano
- Walls of Milan

==== City gates of Milan ====
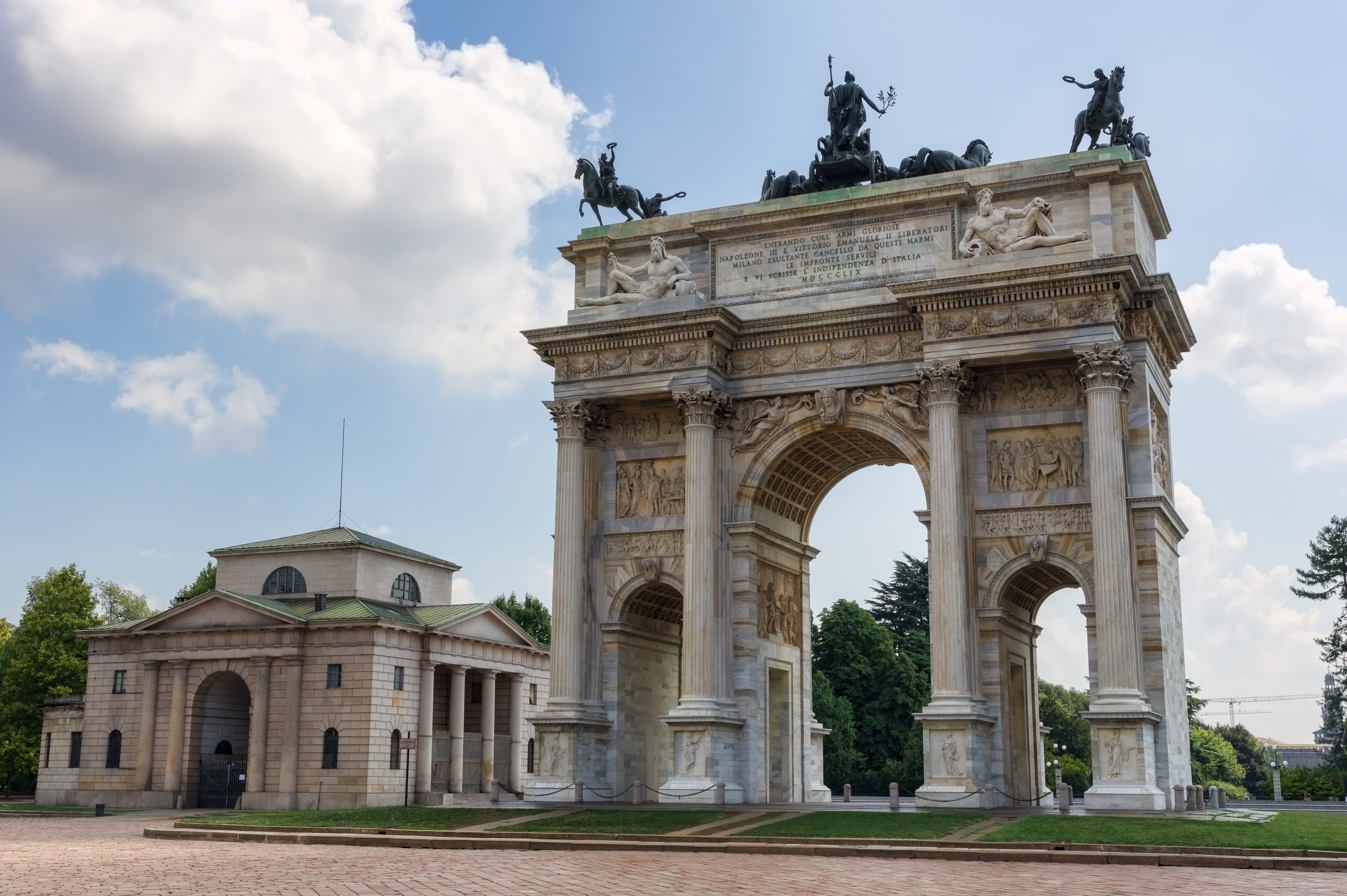
Porta Sempione

- Porta Nuova
- Porta Romana
- Porta Sempione
- Porta Ticinese
- Porta Garibaldi

==== Gardens and parks in Milan ====
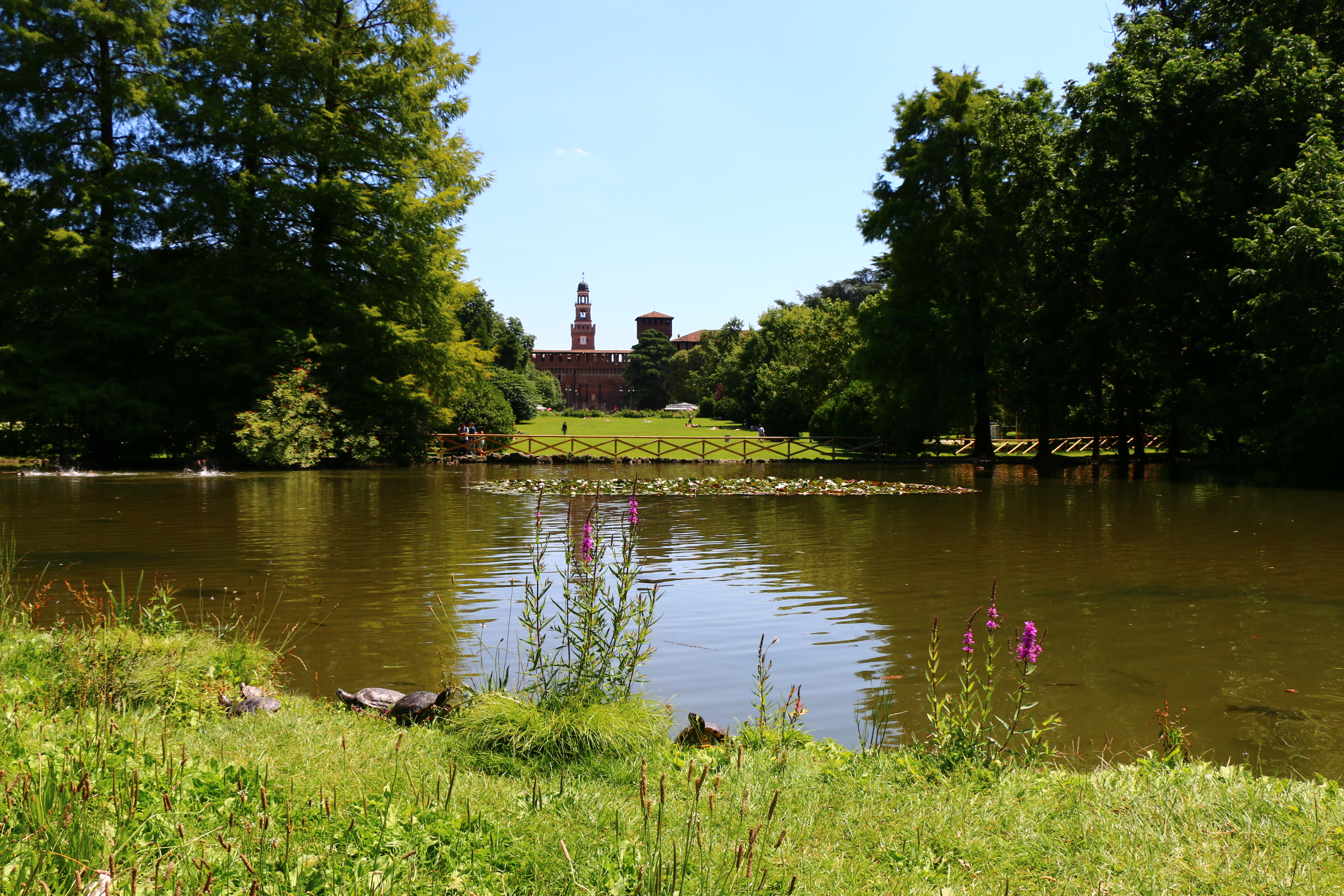
Parco Sempione

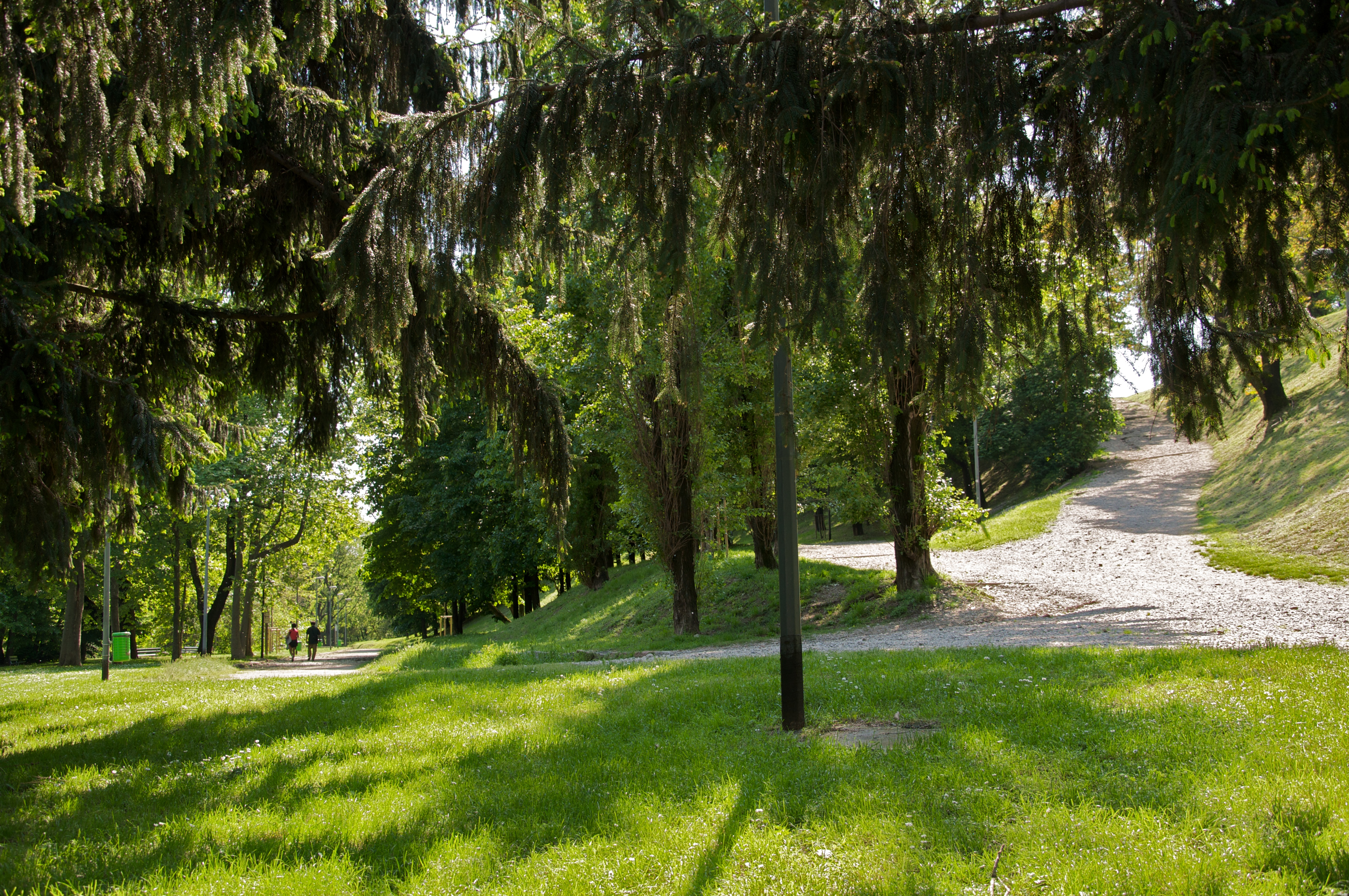
Monte Stella city park

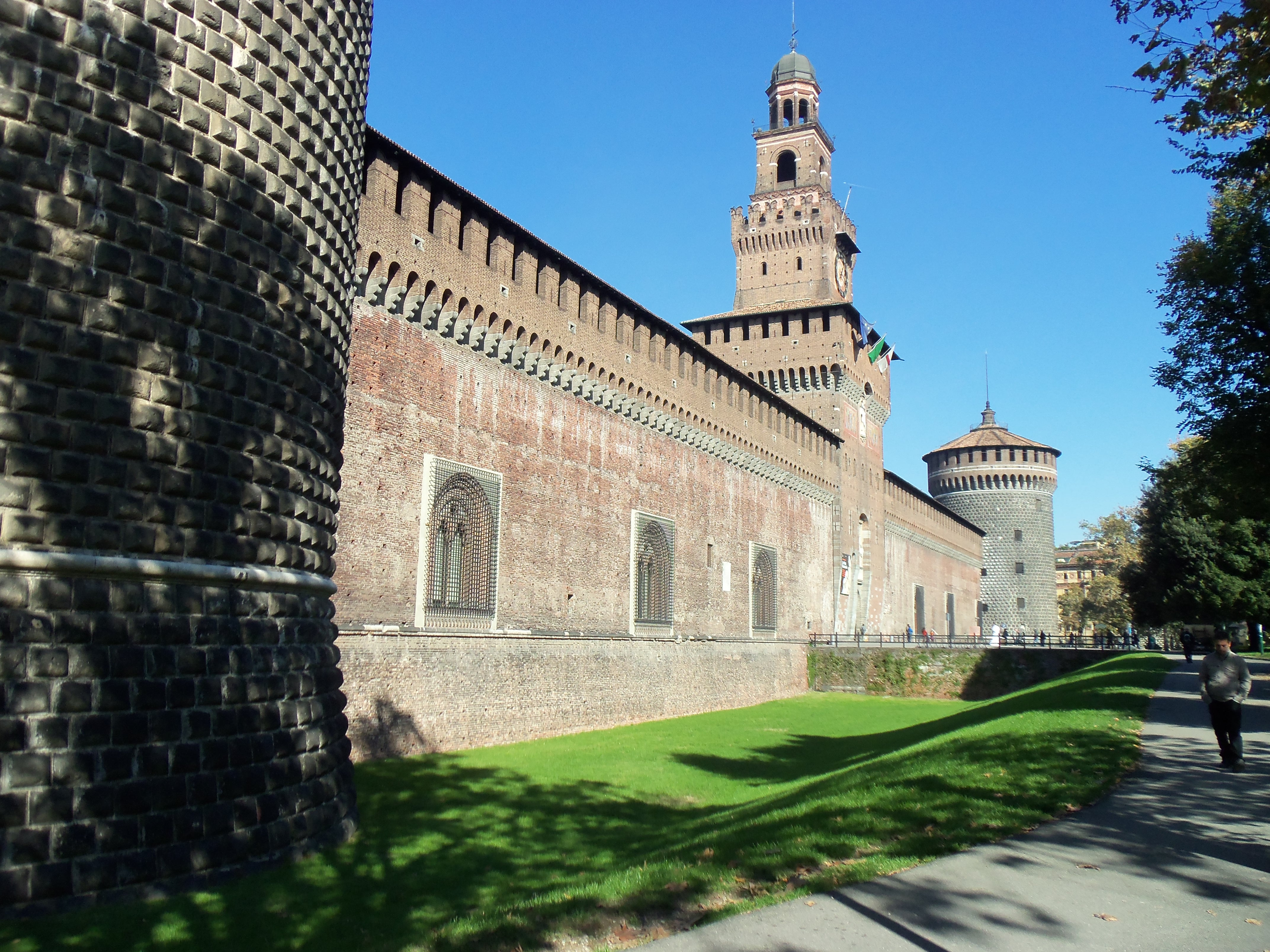
Sforza Castle

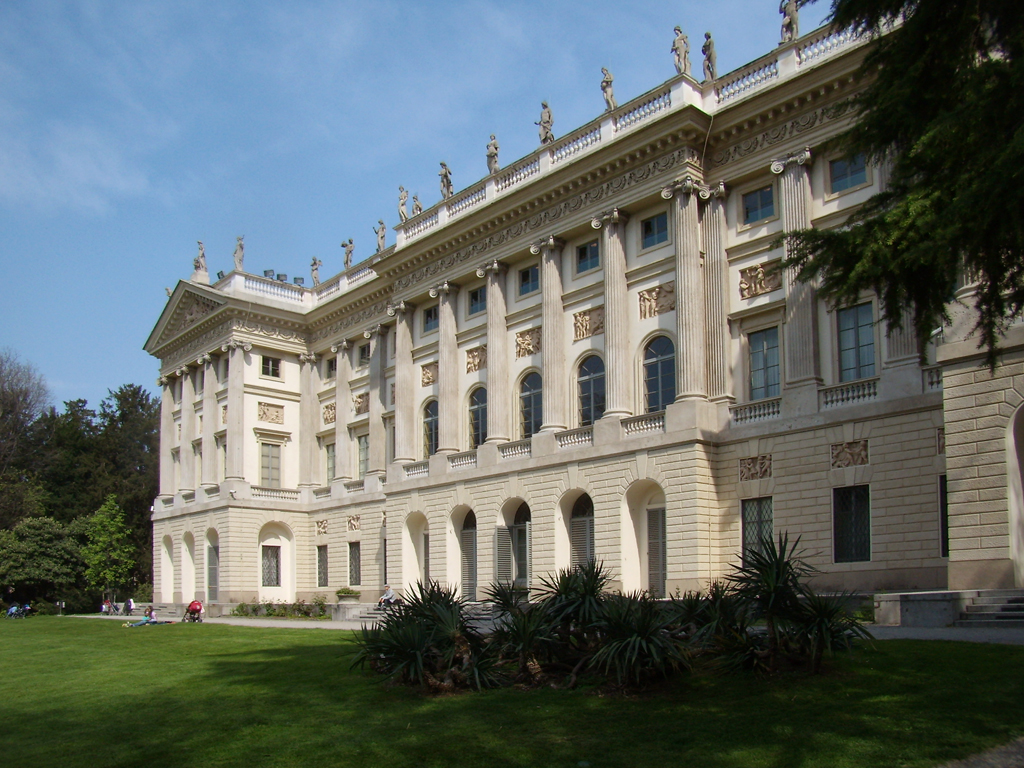
The Royal Villa of Milan

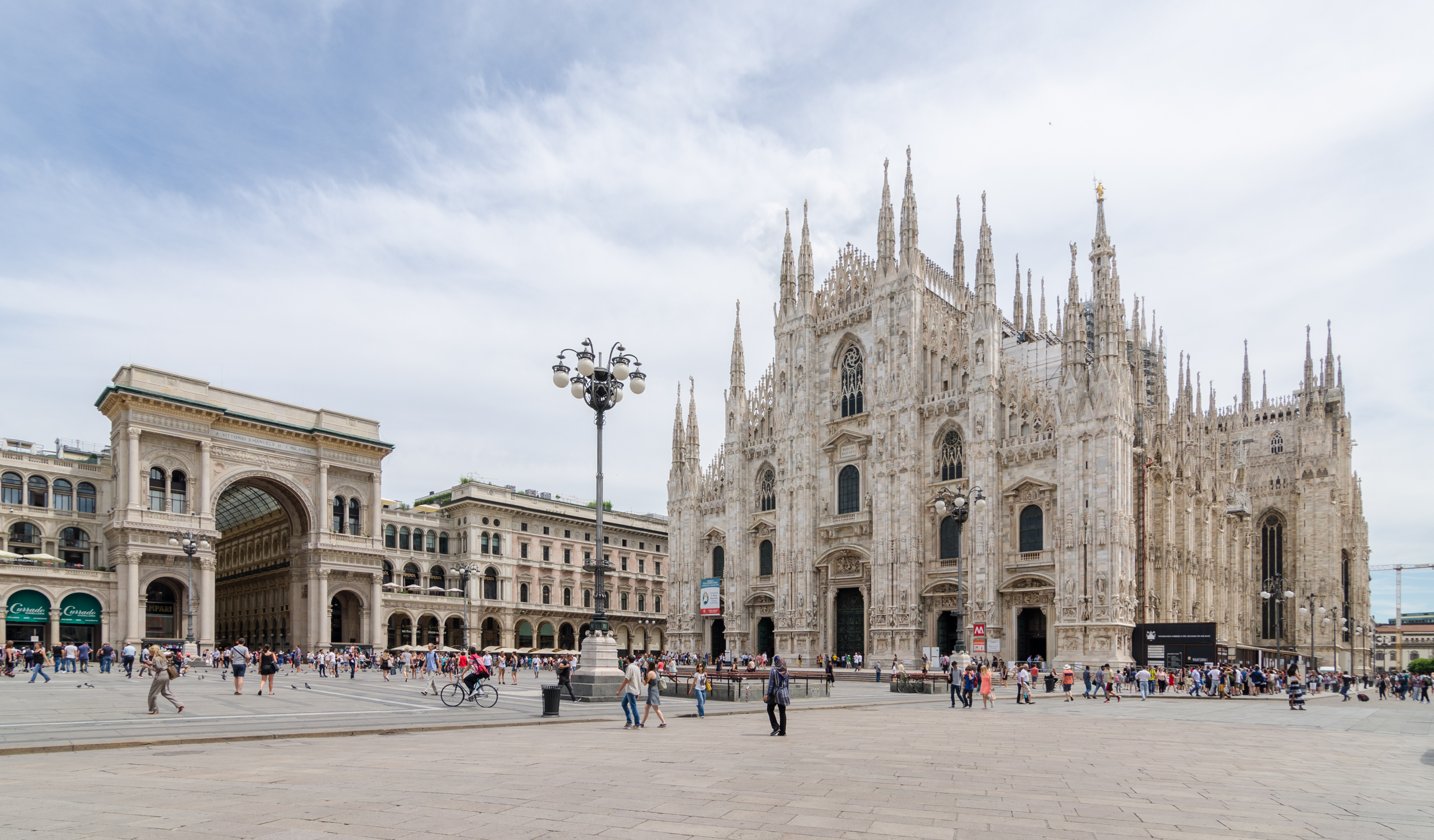
Piazza del Duomo

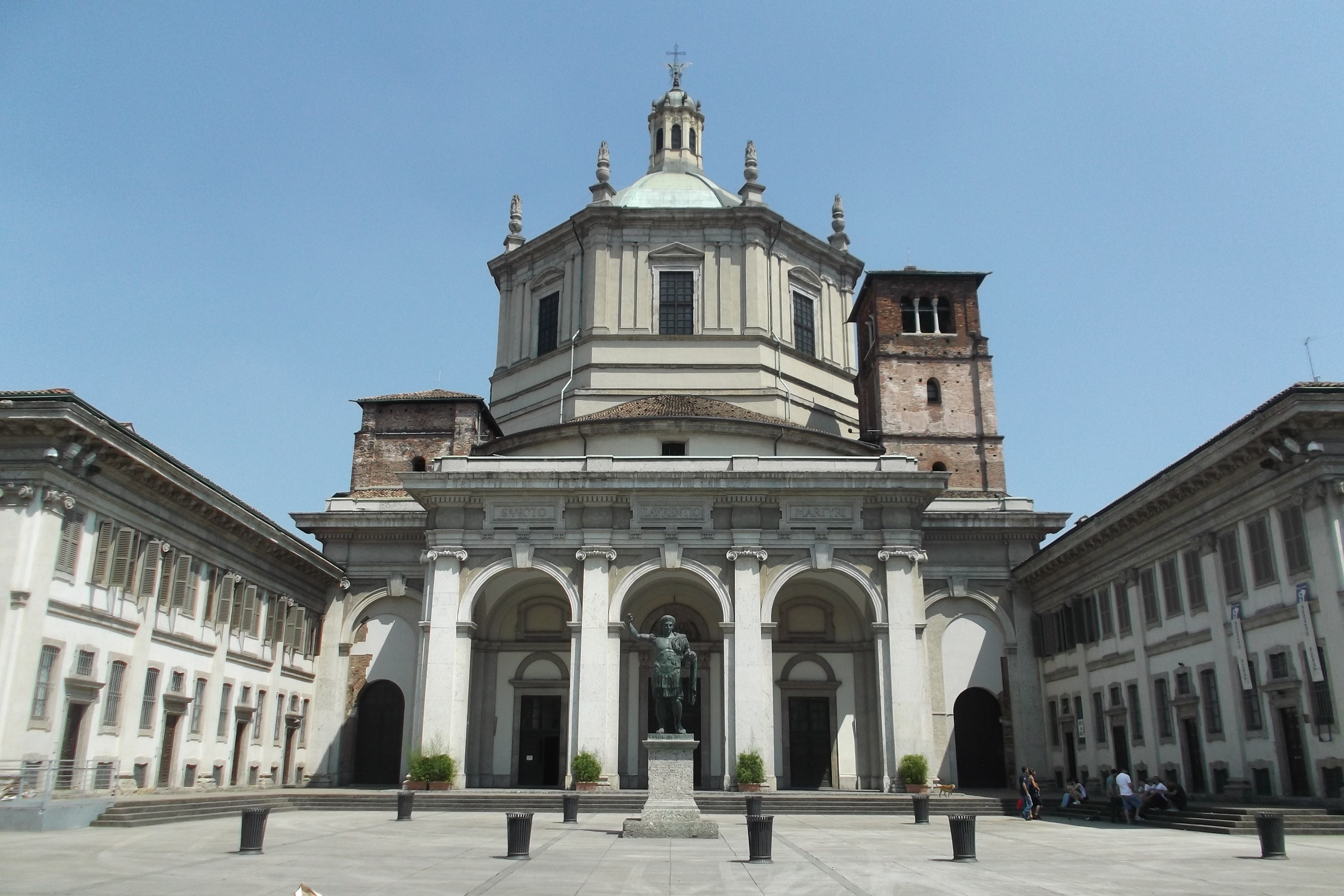
Basilica of San Lorenzo

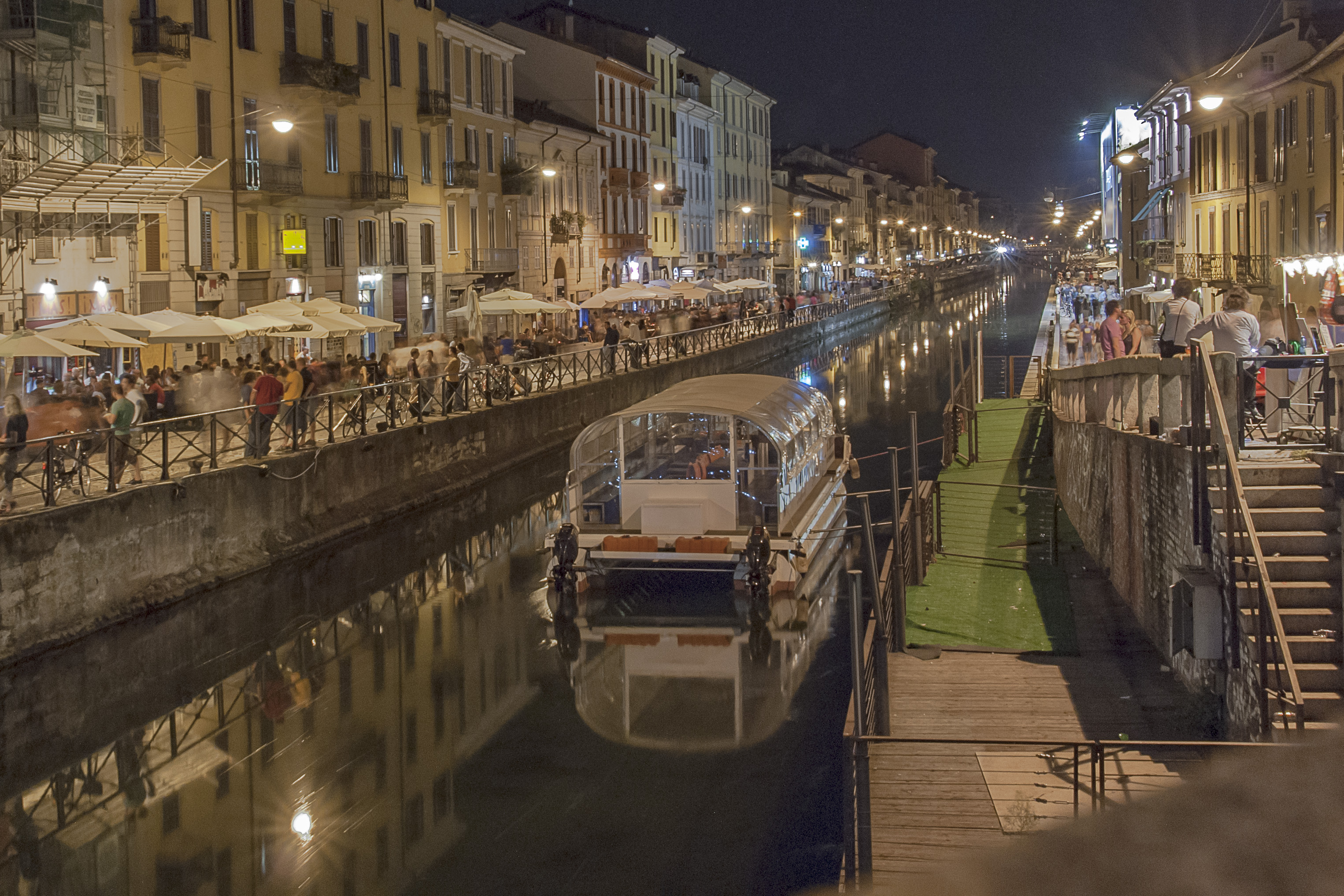
Navigli in Milan by night

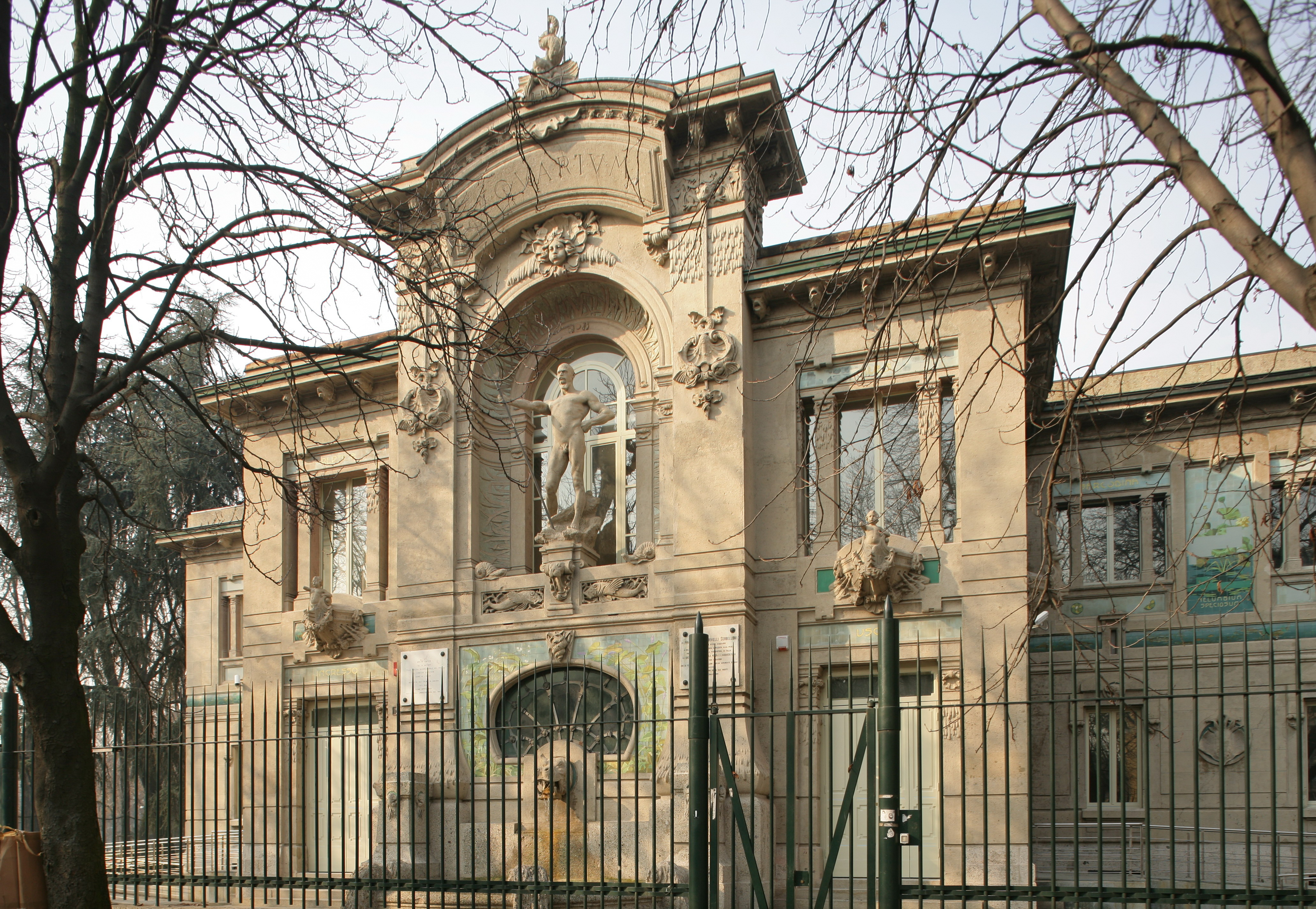
Civic Aquarium of Milan

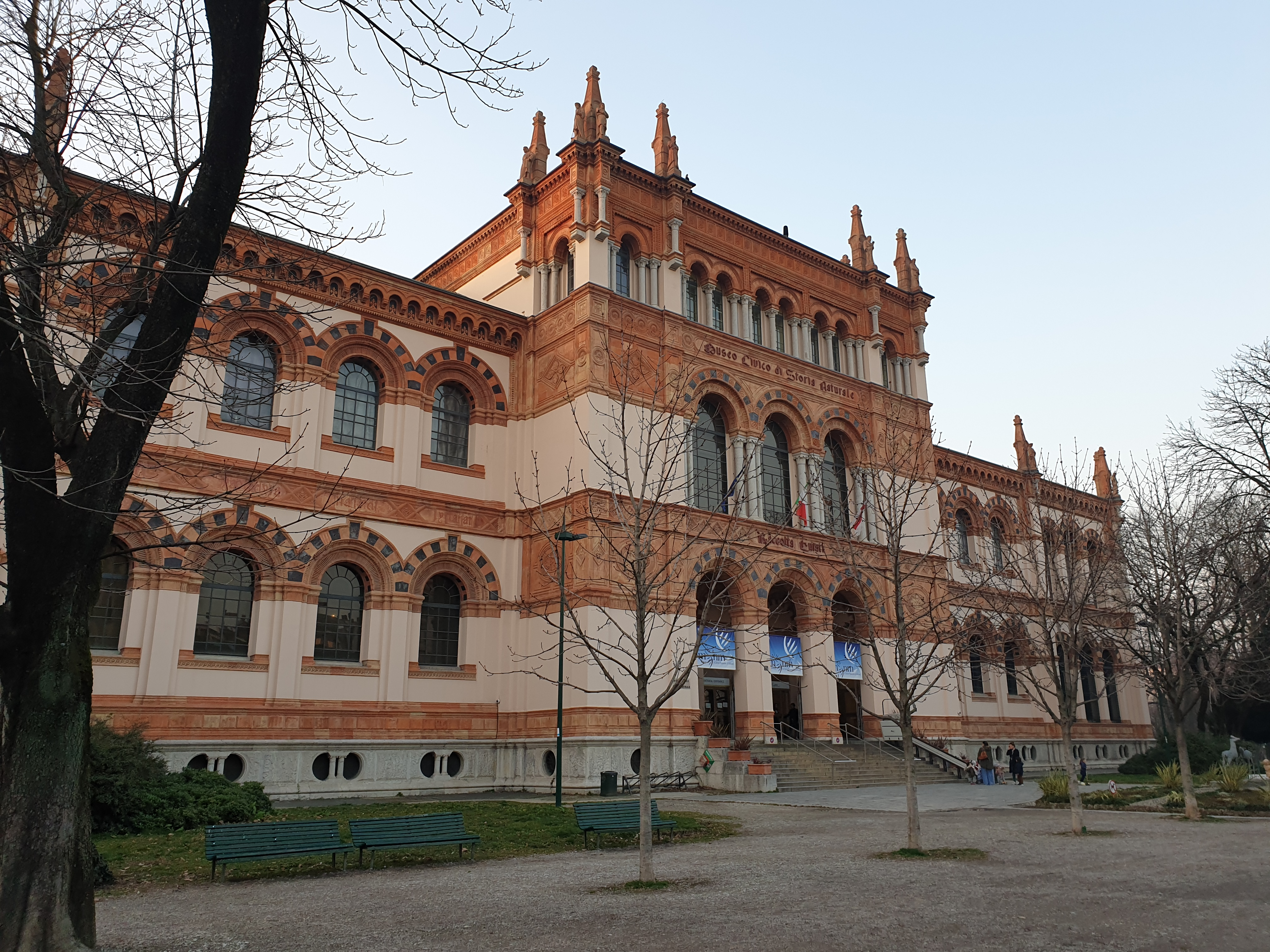
Museo Civico di Storia Naturale di Milano

- Basilicas Park
- Giardini Pubblici Indro Montanelli
- Orto Botanico di Brera
- Orto Botanico di Cascina Rosa
- Parco Agricolo Sud Milano
- Parco Sempione
  - Torre Branca
- Villa Litta Modignani

==== Museums and galleries in Milan ====
Museums and galleries in Milan

- Alfa Romeo Museum
- Armani/Silos
- Bagatti Valsecchi Museum
- Civic Aquarium
- Galleria d'Arte Moderna
- Gallerie di Piazza Scala
  - Palazzo Anguissola Antona Traversi
  - Palazzo Brentani
- Museo Civico di Storia Naturale di Milano
- Museo del Novecento
- Museo del Risorgimento
- Museo della Scienza e della Tecnologia "Leonardo da Vinci"
- Museo Diocesano
- Museo Poldi Pezzoli
- Museo Teatrale alla Scala
- Contemporary Art Pavilion
- Pinacoteca Ambrosiana
- Pinacoteca di Brera
- Sforza Castle
  - Antique Furniture & Wooden Sculpture Museum
  - Applied Arts Collection
  - Archaeological Museum
  - Egyptian Museum
  - Museum of Musical Instruments
  - Museo d'Arte Antica
  - Pinacoteca

==== Public squares in Milan ====
Piazzas in Milan

- Piazza Cordusio
- Piazza del Duomo
- Piazza della Scala
- Piazza Mercanti

==== Religious sites in Milan ====
- Cathedrals in Milan
- Basilicas in Milan
- Churches in Milan

==== Shopping malls in Milan ====
- Galleria Vittorio Emanuele II

==== Streets and canals in Milan ====
- Corso Buenos Aires
- Navigli
  - Naviglio di Bereguardo
  - Naviglio di Paderno
  - Naviglio Grande
  - Naviglio Martesana
  - Naviglio Pavese
- Quadrilatero della moda
- Via della Spiga
- Via Monte Napoleone

==== Villas and palaces in Milan ====
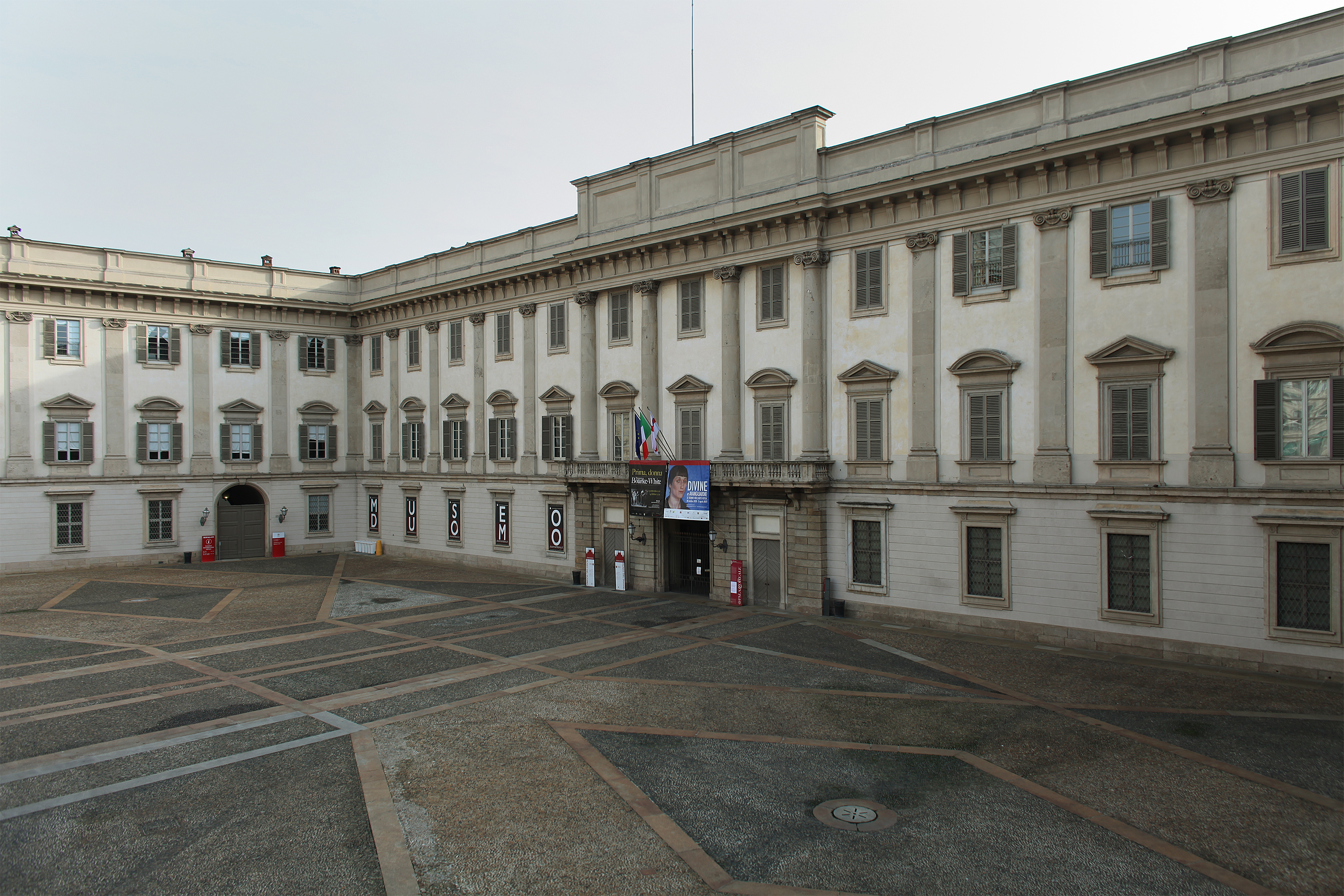
Royal Palace of Milan

Villas and palaces in Milan

- Casa Campanini
- Casa degli Omenoni
- Casa di Riposo per Musicisti
- Casa Manzoni
- Casa Panigarola
- Castello Cova
- Palazzo dell'Arengario
- Palazzo della Banca Commerciale Italiana
- Palazzo Belgioioso
- Palazzo Borromeo
- Palazzo Carminati
- Palazzo Castiglioni
- Palazzo dei Giureconsulti
- Palazzo Mezzanotte
- Palazzo della Ragione
- Palazzo delle Scuole Palatine
- Palazzo del Senato
- Royal Palace of Milan
- Villa Belgiojoso Bonaparte

=== Demographics of Milan ===
Demographics of Milan

== Government and politics of Milan ==
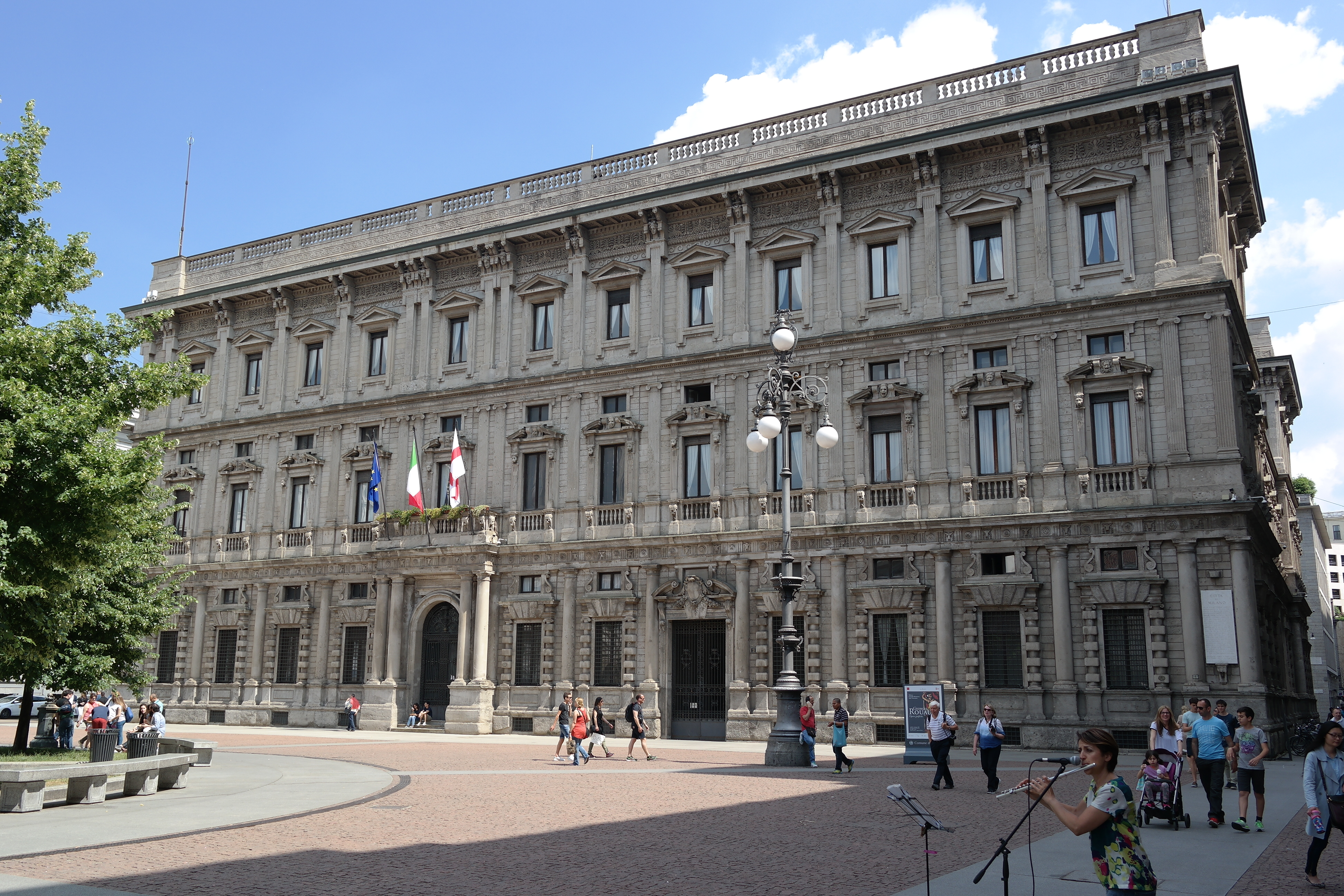
Palazzo Marino, Milan's city hall and seat of the City Council

Government and politics of Milan

- Elections in Milan
  - Milan municipal election, 2016
- Government of Milan
  - Mayor of Milan
    - List of mayors of Milan
  - City Council of Milan
- International relations
  - Sister cities of Milan

== History of Milan ==
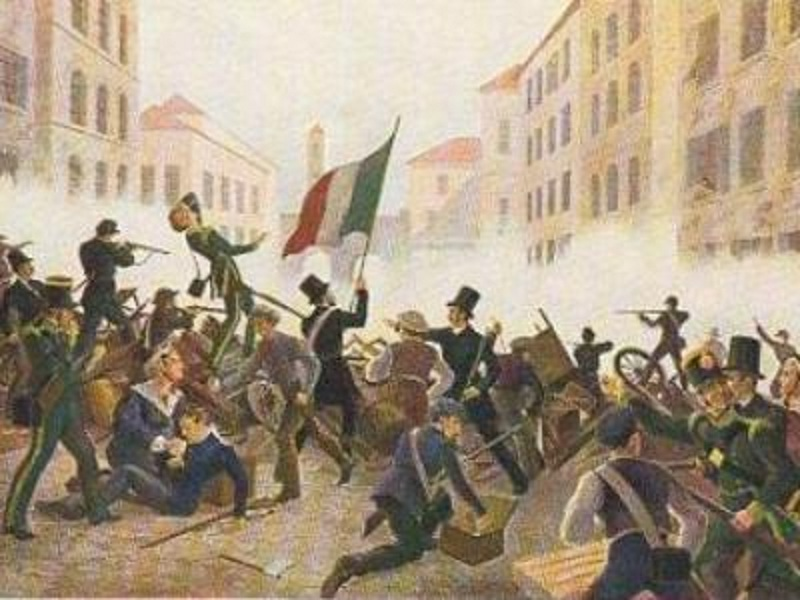
Popular print depicting the "Five Days of Milan" (18–22 March 1848) uprising against Austrian rule

History of Milan

- Mediolanum

=== History of Milan, by period ===
- Timeline of Milan

=== History of Milan, by subject ===
- Bava-Beccaris massacre
- Edict of Milan
- Five Days of Milan
- Golden Ambrosian Republic
- Great Plague of Milan
- Piazza Fontana bombing
- Rulers of Milan
  - House of Sforza

== Culture in Milan ==
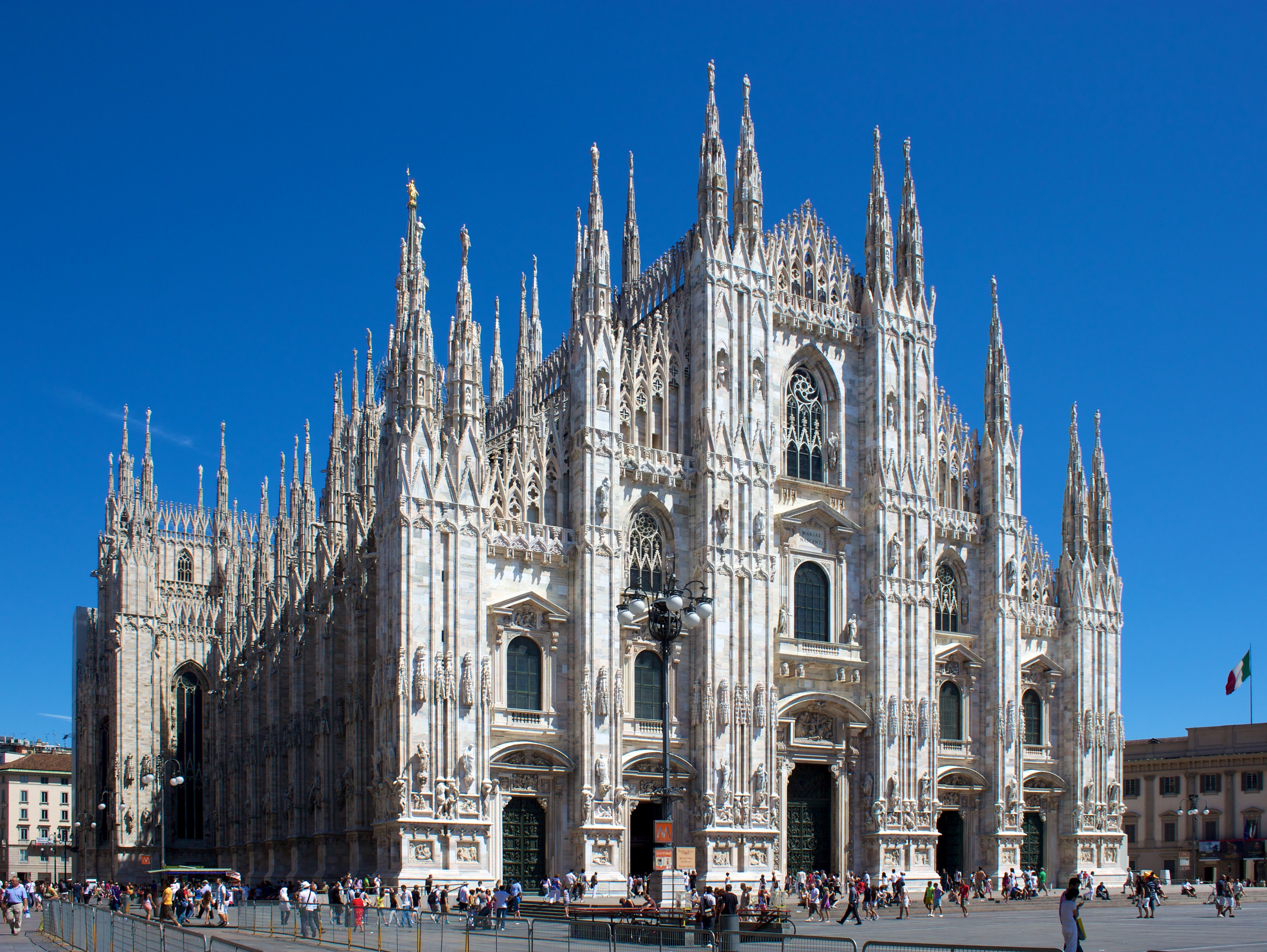
Milan Cathedral is the largest church in the Italian Republic—the larger St. Peter's Basilica is in the State of Vatican City, a sovereign state—and the third largest in the world.

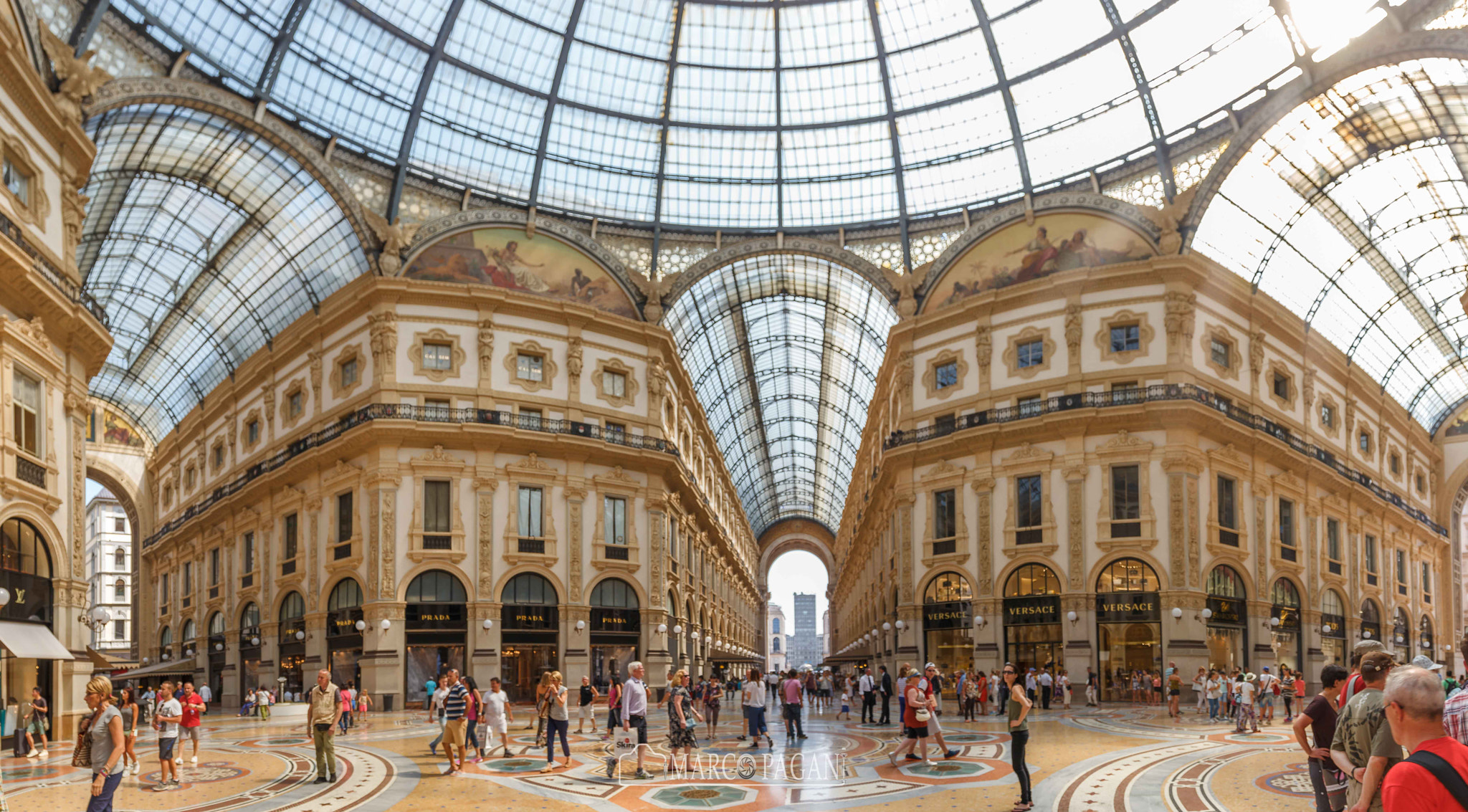
Galleria Vittorio Emanuele II is Italy's oldest active shopping gallery and a major landmark of Milan.

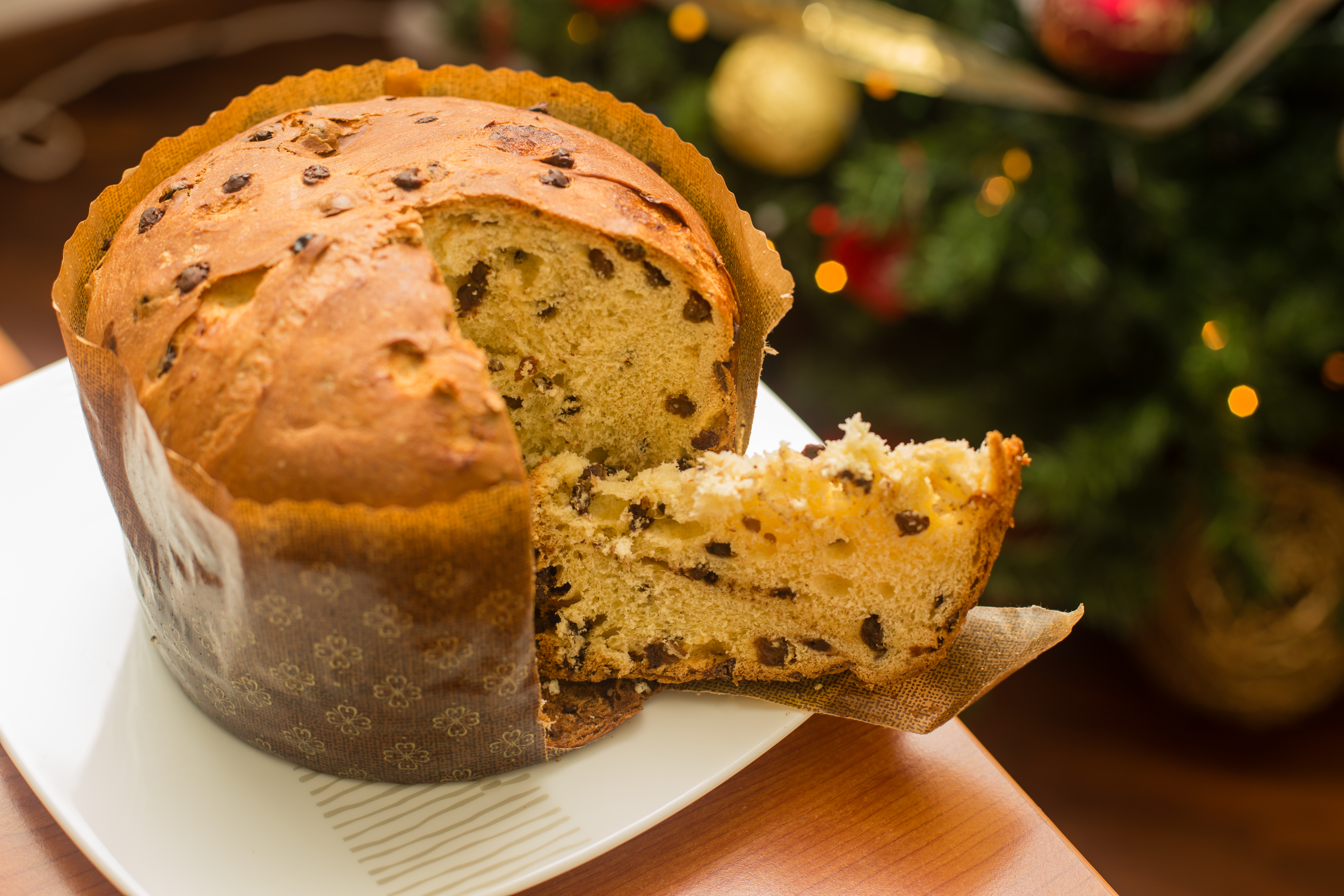
Panettone, Milan's traditional Christmas cake

Culture of Milan

- Architecture of Milan
  - Buildings in Milan
    - Tallest buildings in Milan
    - Villas and palaces in Milan
  - Neoclassical architecture in Milan
- Cuisine of Milan
  - Lombard cuisine
- Fashion in Milan
  - Fashion capital
  - Milan fashion district
  - Milan Fashion Week
- Languages of Milan
  - Western Lombard dialect
    - Milanese dialect
- Media in Milan
  - Newspapers
    - Corriere della Sera
    - Il Giornale
    - Il Giorno
  - Radio stations
    - RTL 102.5
    - Radio 24
    - Radio Classica
- Museums in Milan
- People from Milan
- Stolpersteine in Milan
- Symbols of Milan
  - Flag of Milan

=== Art in Milan ===
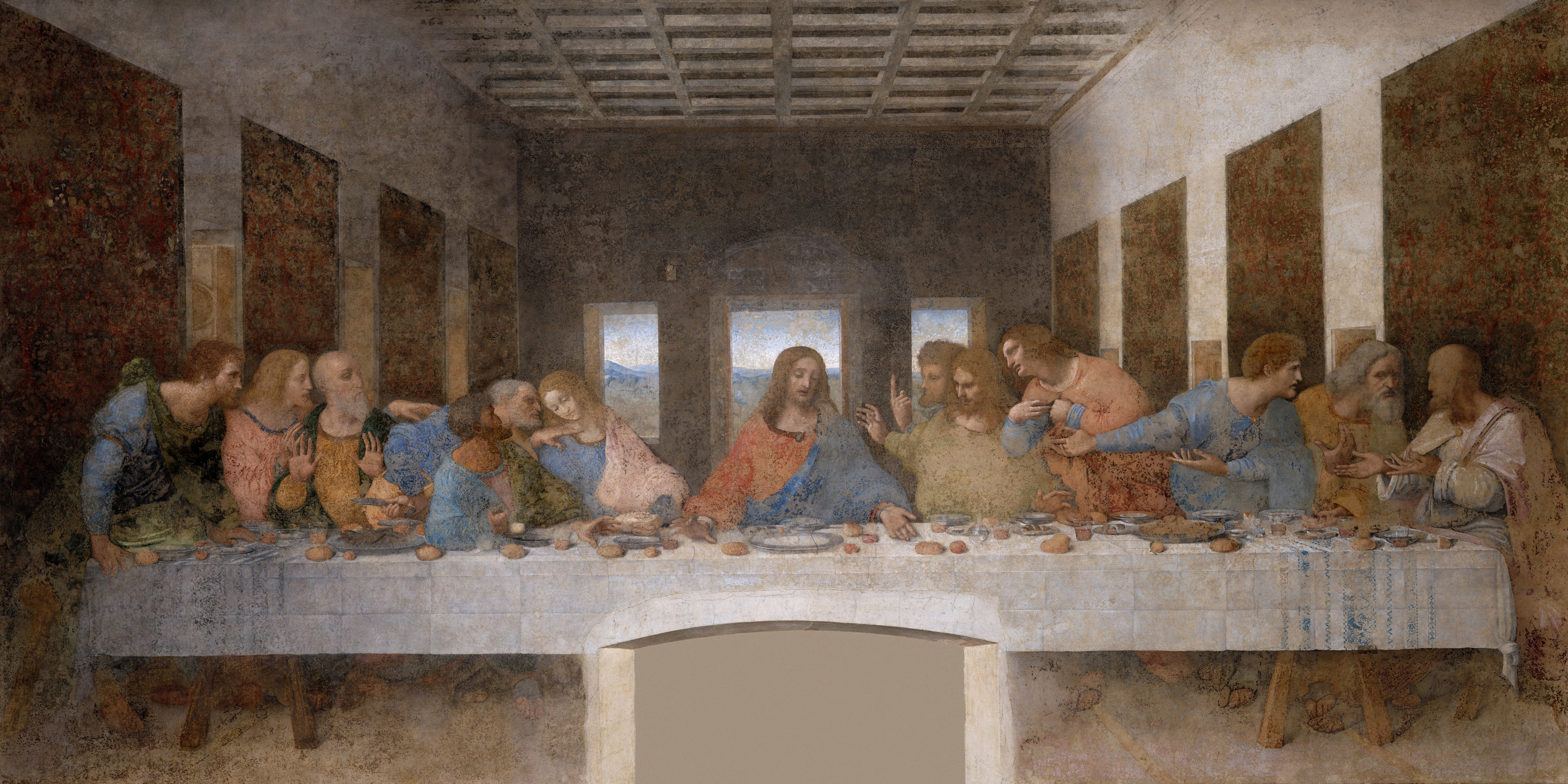
The Last Supper, a late 15th-century mural painting by Leonardo da Vinci housed by the refectory of the convent of Santa Maria delle Grazie in Milan

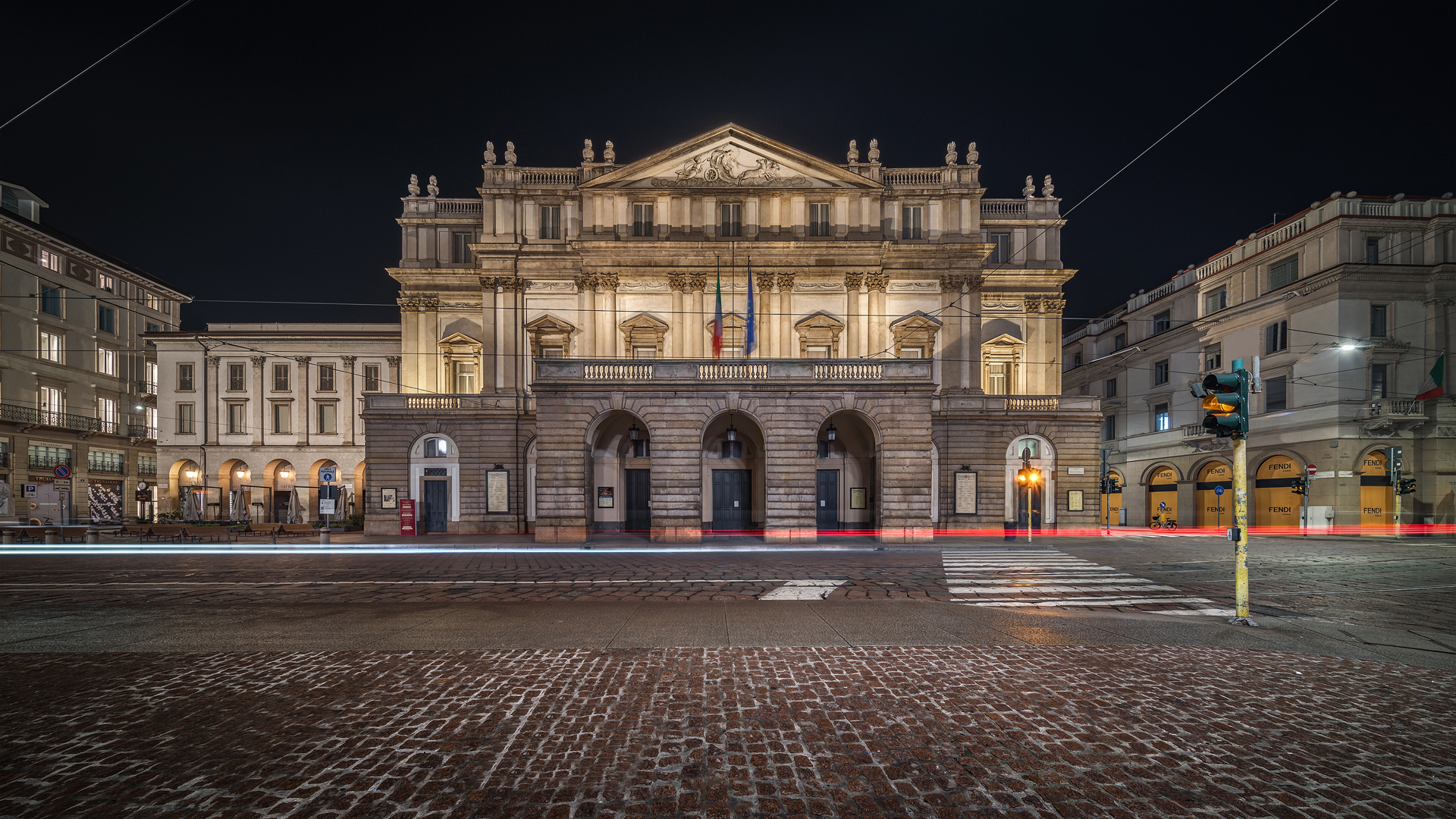
Founded in 1778, La Scala is the world's most famous opera house.

- Novecento Italiano

==== Ballet in Milan ====
- La Scala Theatre Ballet
  - La Scala Theatre Ballet School

==== Cinema of Milan ====
- Films set in Milan
  - Miracle in Milan

==== Literature of Milan ====
- Western Lombard literature

==== Music of Milan ====
Music of Milan

- Casa Ricordi
- Milan Conservatory
- Orchestra Sinfonica di Milano Giuseppe Verdi

==== Theatre of Milan ====
- La Scala
- Piccolo Teatro
- Teatro degli Arcimboldi
- Teatro Dal Verme
- Teatro Lirico

Theatre school in Milan

- Accademia dei Filodrammatici

=== Events and traditions in Milan ===
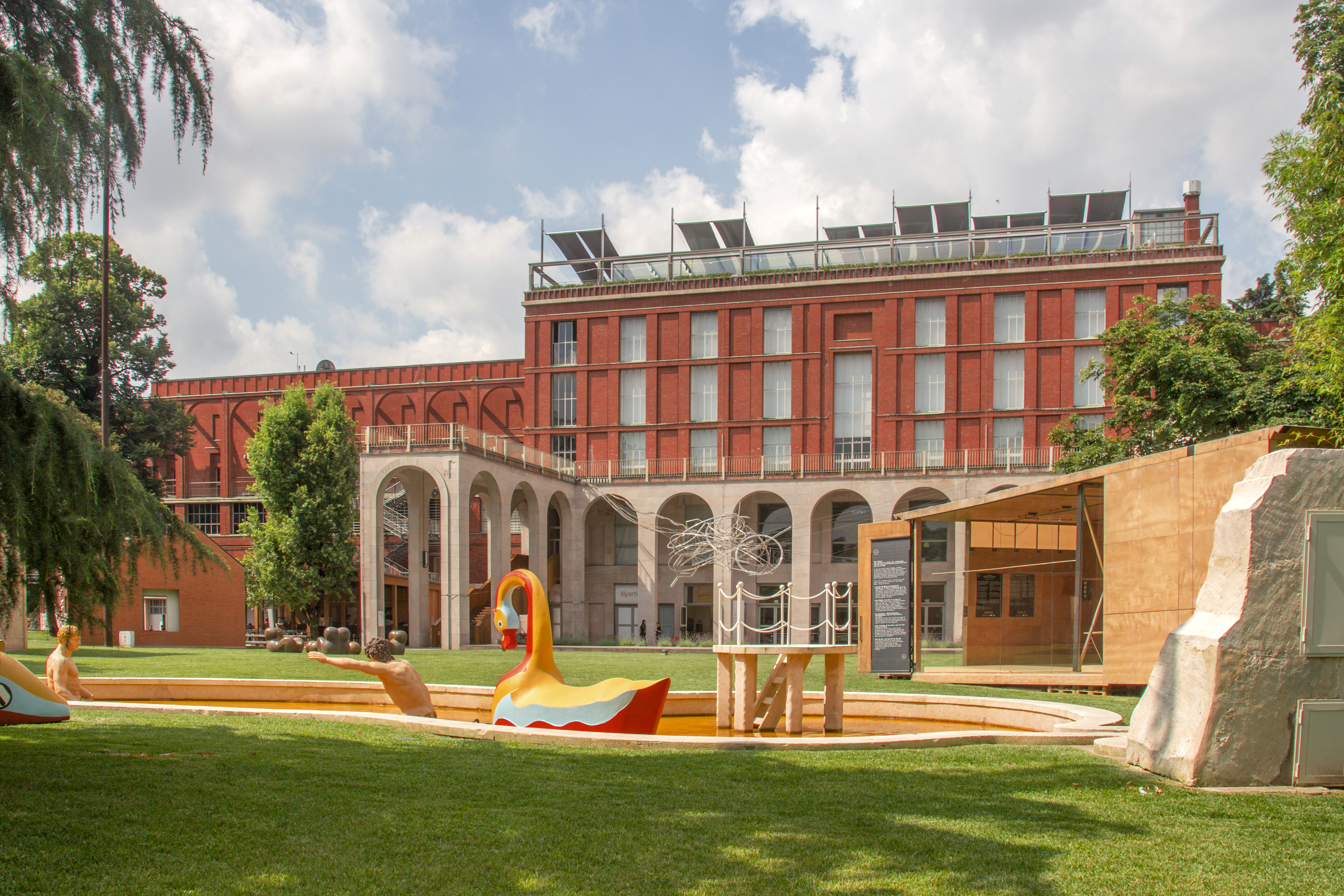
Palazzo dell'Arte, home of the Triennale di Milano

- EICMA
- Expo 2015
- Fiera Milano
- Milan Fashion Week
- Milan Furniture Fair
- Milan International (1906)
- Oh bej! Oh bej!
- Milan Triennial

=== Religion in Milan ===
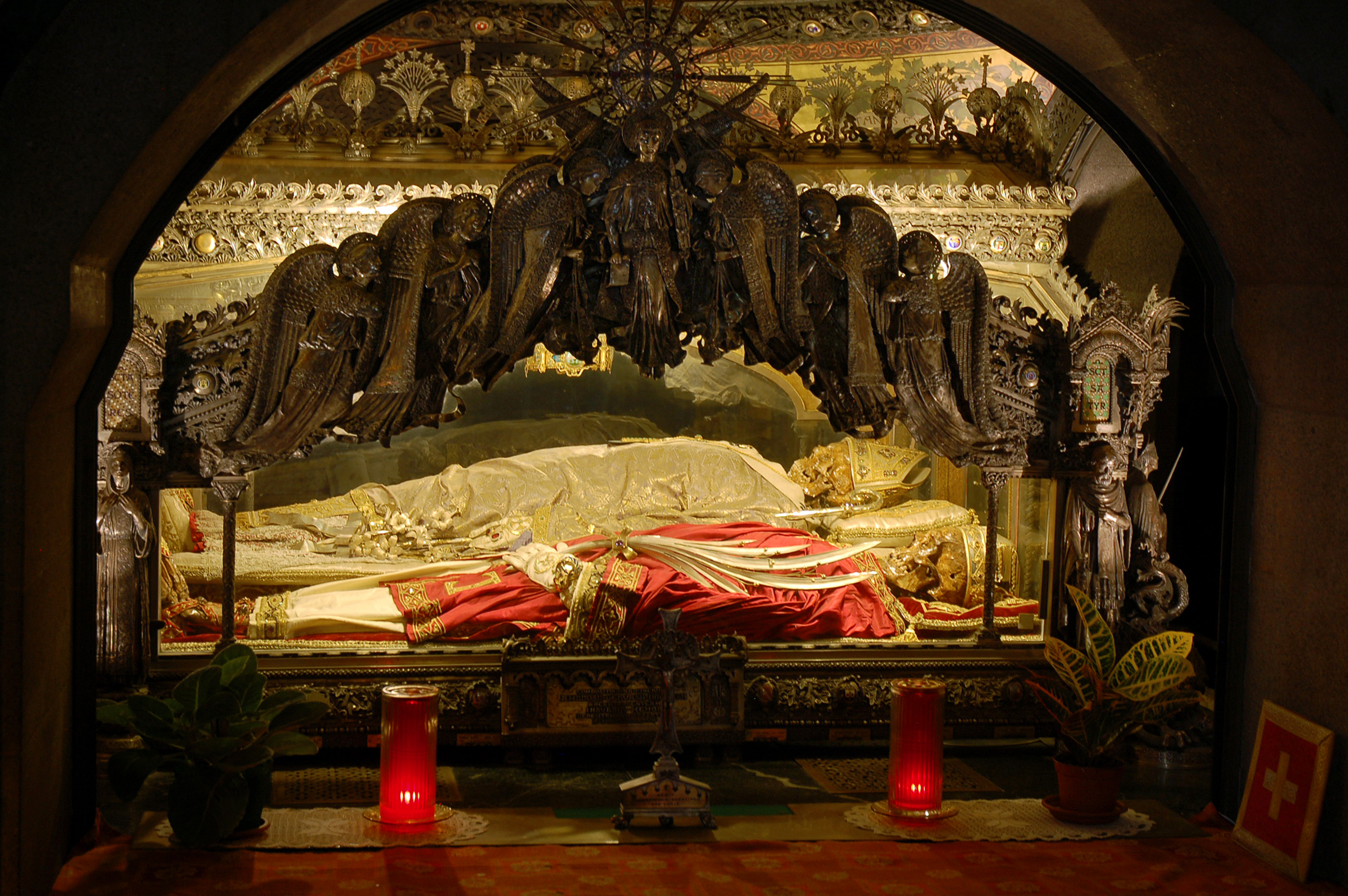
Saint Ambrose (with white vestments), the patron saint of Milan, in an embossed silver urn in the Basilica of Sant'Ambrogio crypt

Religion in Milan

- Ambrose
- Ambrosian Rite
- Early Christian churches in Milan

==== Catholicism in Milan ====
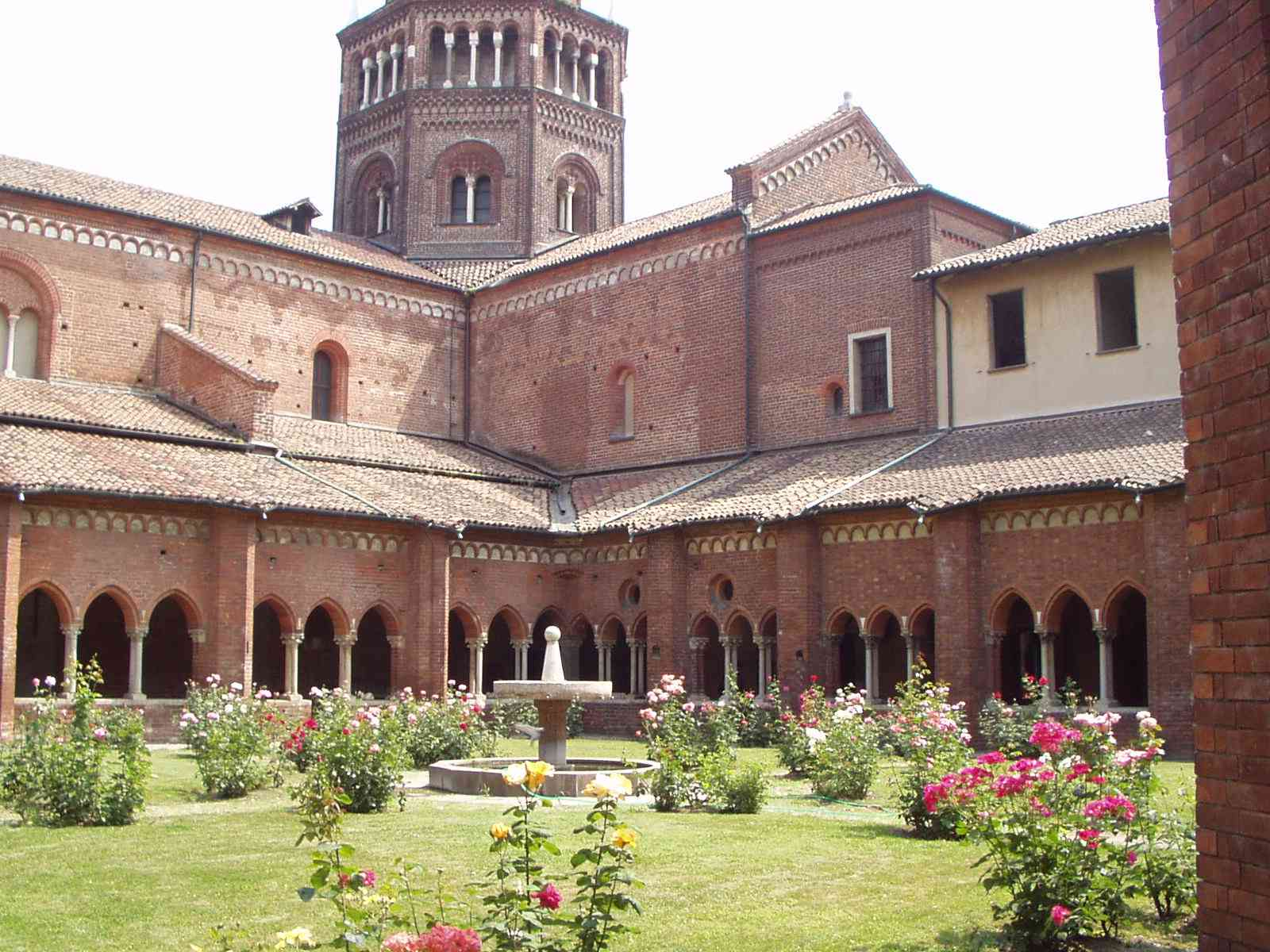
Chiaravalle Abbey, the cloister

Catholicism in Milan

- Bishop of Milan
- Diocese of Milan
- Roman Catholic Archdiocese of Milan
- Chiaravalle Abbey
- Garegnano Charterhouse
- Mirasole Abbey

===== Cathedrals in Milan =====
- Milan Cathedral
  - Basilica di Santa Tecla
  - Madonnina (statue)

===== Basilicas in Milan =====
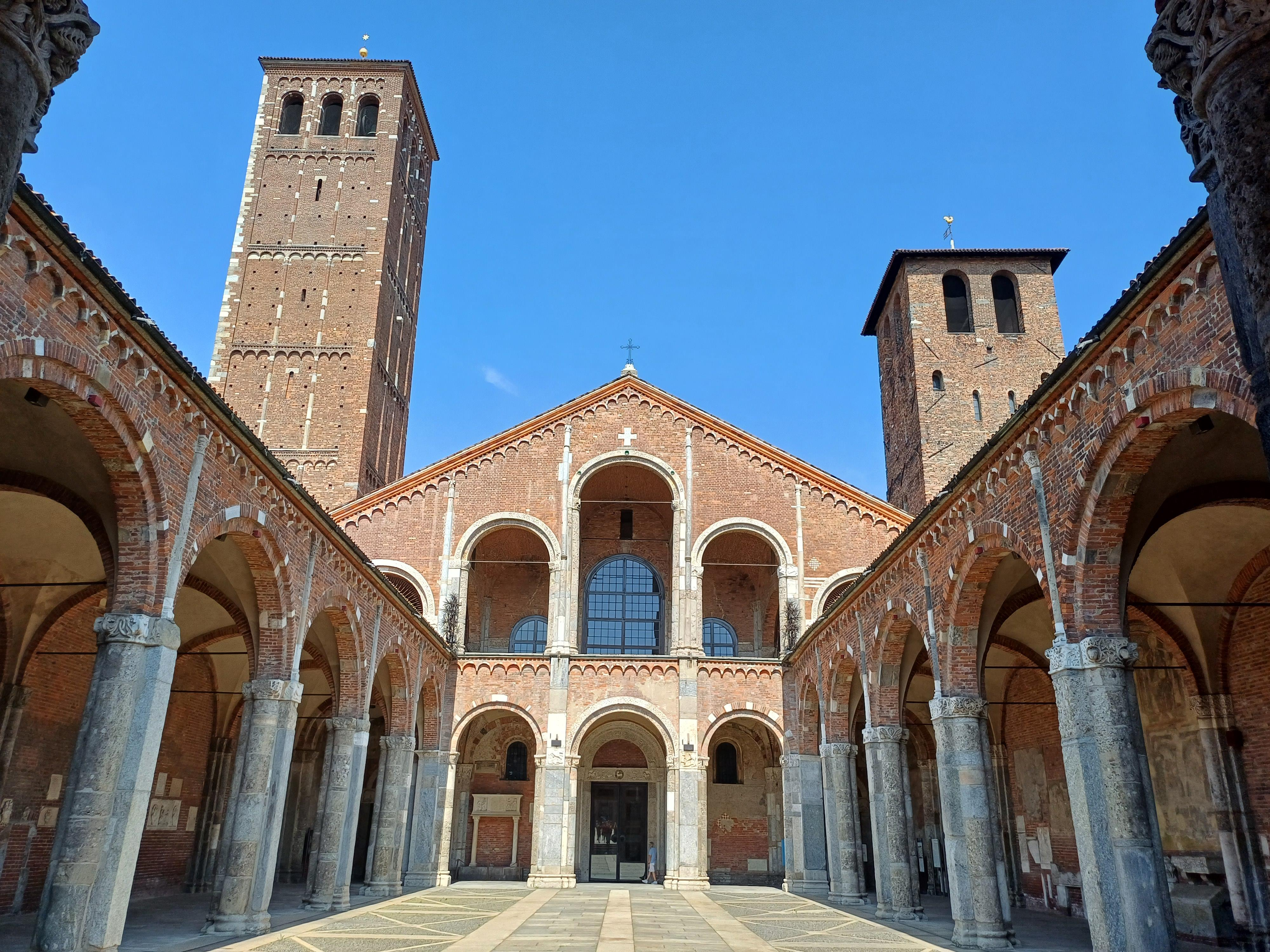
Basilica of Sant'Ambrogio, one of the most ancient churches in Milan

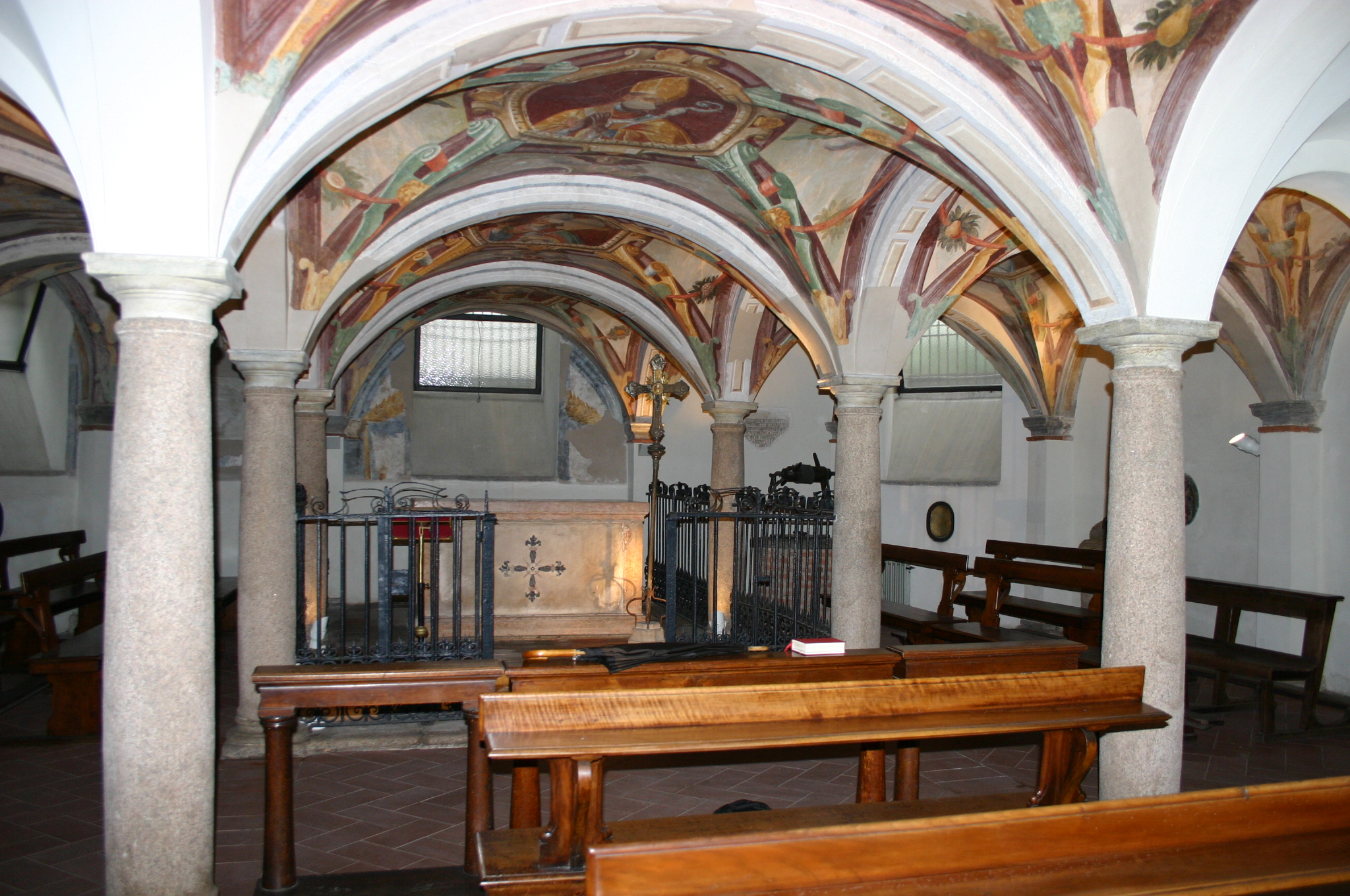
Basilica di San Calimero, the 16th century crypt

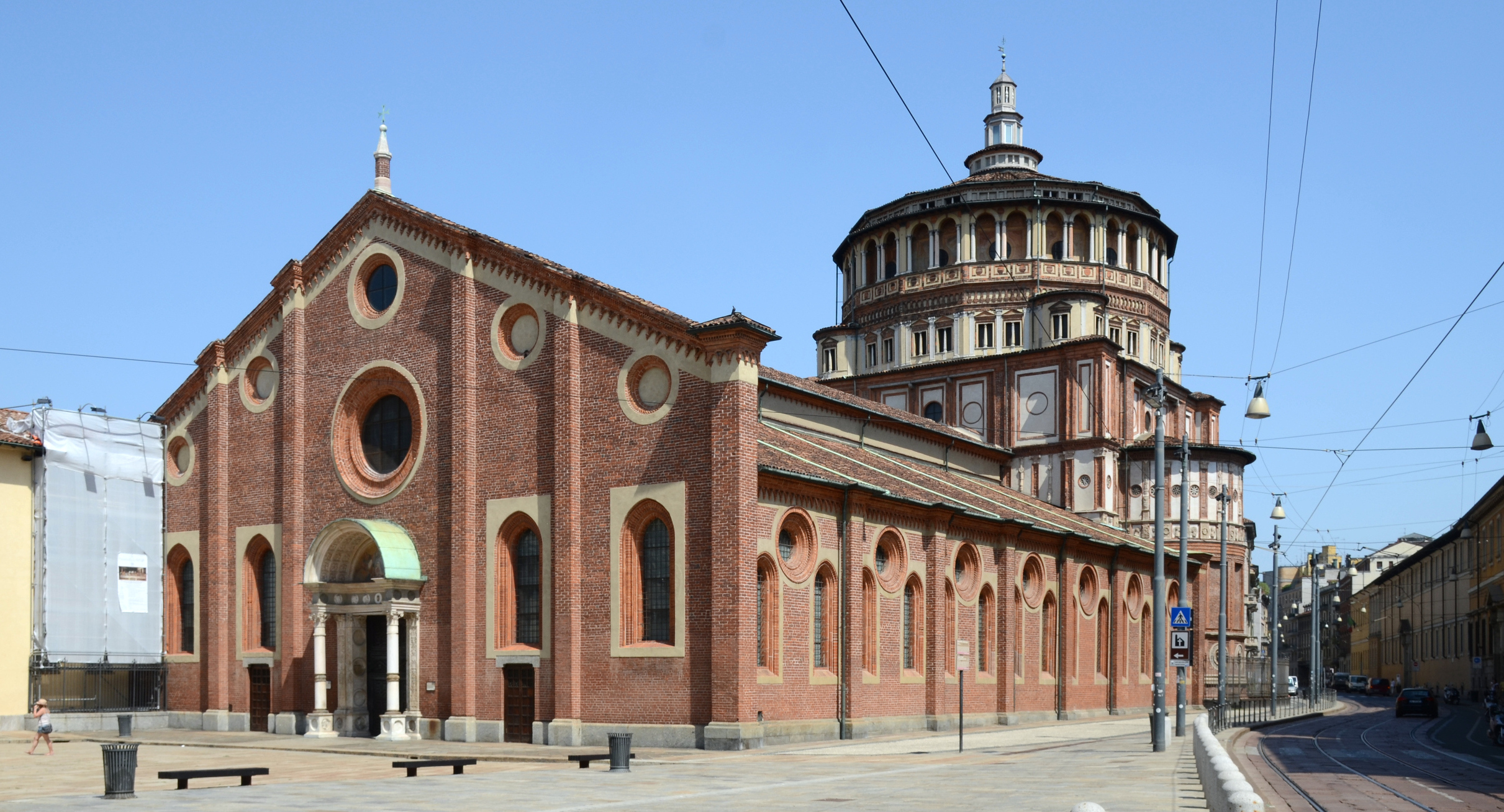
Santa Maria delle Grazie, which houses the famous mural painting of Leonardo da Vinci, The Last Supper

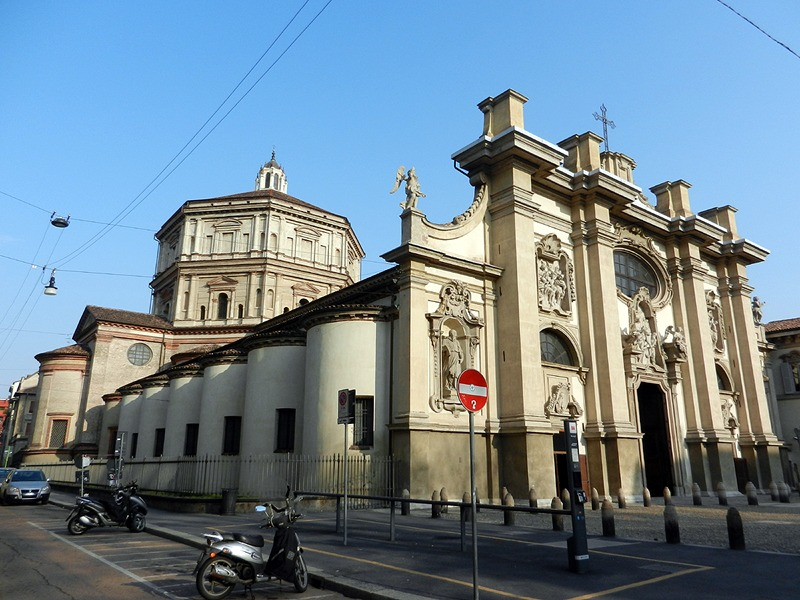
Santa Maria della Passione, a late Renaissance-style church with a late Baroque facade

- Basilica of Sant'Ambrogio
- Basilica di San Calimero
- San Carlo al Corso
- Basilica of Sant'Eustorgio
  - Portinari Chapel
- Basilica of San Lorenzo
  - Colonne di San Lorenzo
- San Marco
- Santa Maria delle Grazie
  - The Last Supper (Leonardo da Vinci)
- Santa Maria della Passione
- San Nazaro in Brolo
- Basilica of San Simpliciano
- Basilica di Santo Stefano Maggiore
- San Vincenzo in Prato
- San Vittore al Corpo

===== Churches in Milan =====
- San Angelo
- San Antonio Abate
- San Barnaba
- San Bernardino alle Ossa
- San Cristoforo sul Naviglio
- San Fedele
- San Giorgio al Palazzo
- San Giovanni in Conca
- San Gottardo
- Santa Maria del Carmine
- Santa Maria della Pace
- Santa Maria Incoronata
- Santa Maria presso San Celso
- Santa Maria presso San Satiro
- San Maurizio al Monastero Maggiore
- San Pietro in Gessate
- San Sebastiano
- San Sepolcro
- Oratorio di San Protaso
- Rotonda della Besana

=== Sports in Milan ===
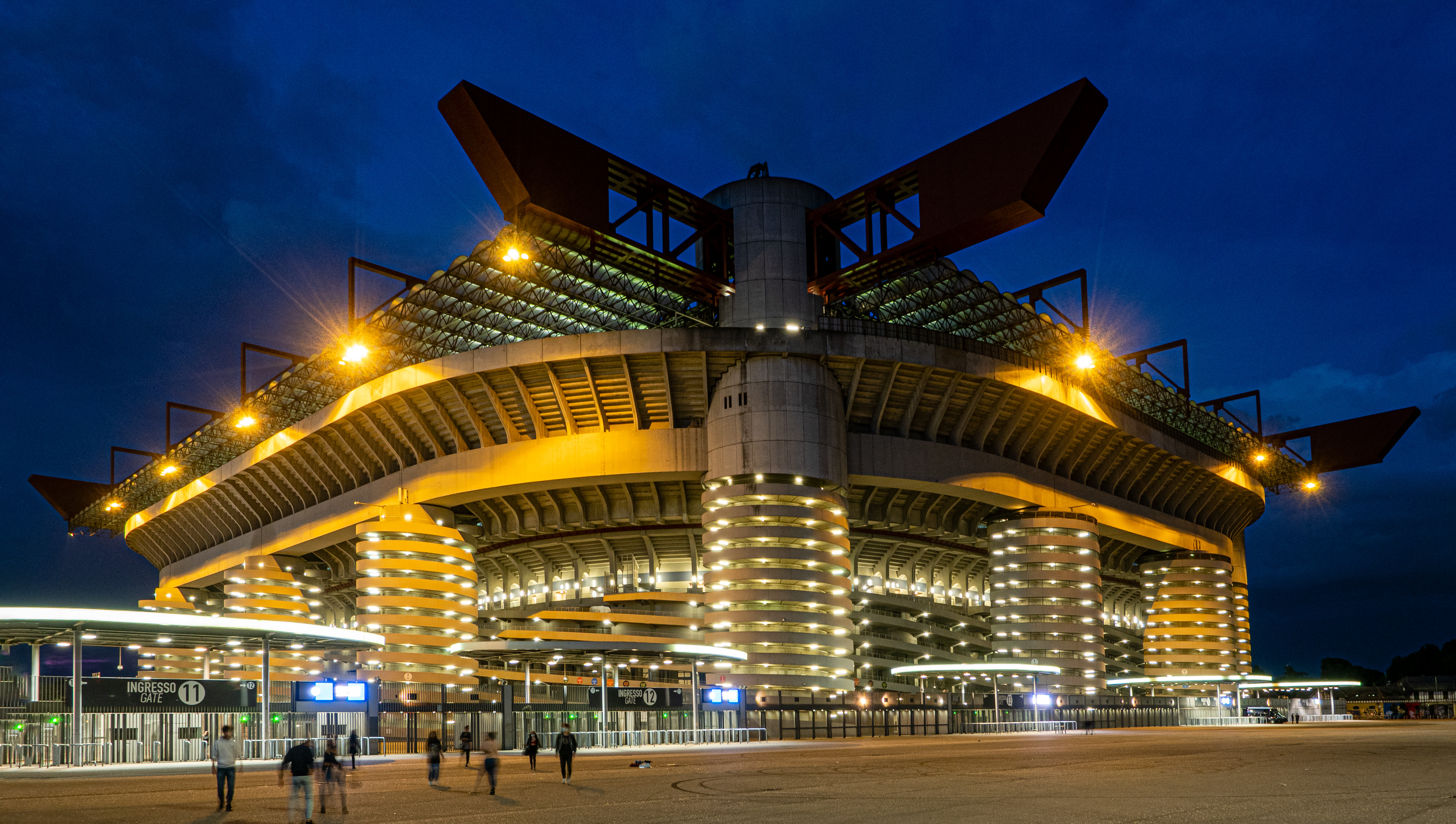
San Siro Stadium, Italy's biggest stadium, home of AC Milan and Inter Milan

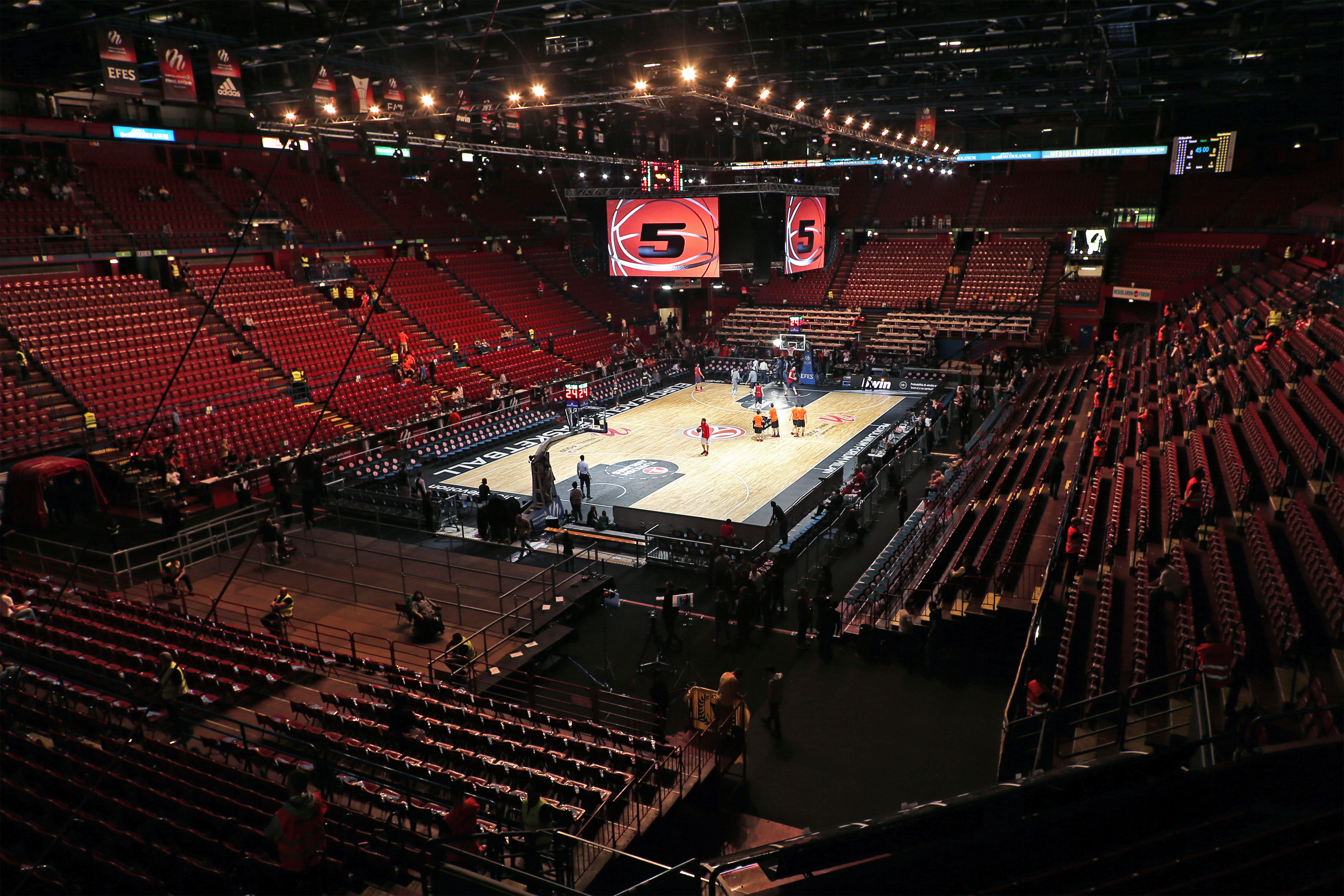
Mediolanum Forum, home of Olimpia Milano

Sports in Milan

- Basketball in Milan
  - Olimpia Milano
- Football in Milan
  - Association football in Milan
    - A.C. Milan
      - History of A.C. Milan
      - List of A.C. Milan players
    - Inter Milan
      - History of Inter Milan
      - List of Inter Milan players
  - Milan Derby
- Running in Milan
  - Milan Marathon
- Sports venues in Milan
  - Arena Civica
    - Notturna di Milano
  - Mediolanum Forum
  - San Siro
  - Velodromo Vigorelli

== Economy and infrastructure of Milan ==
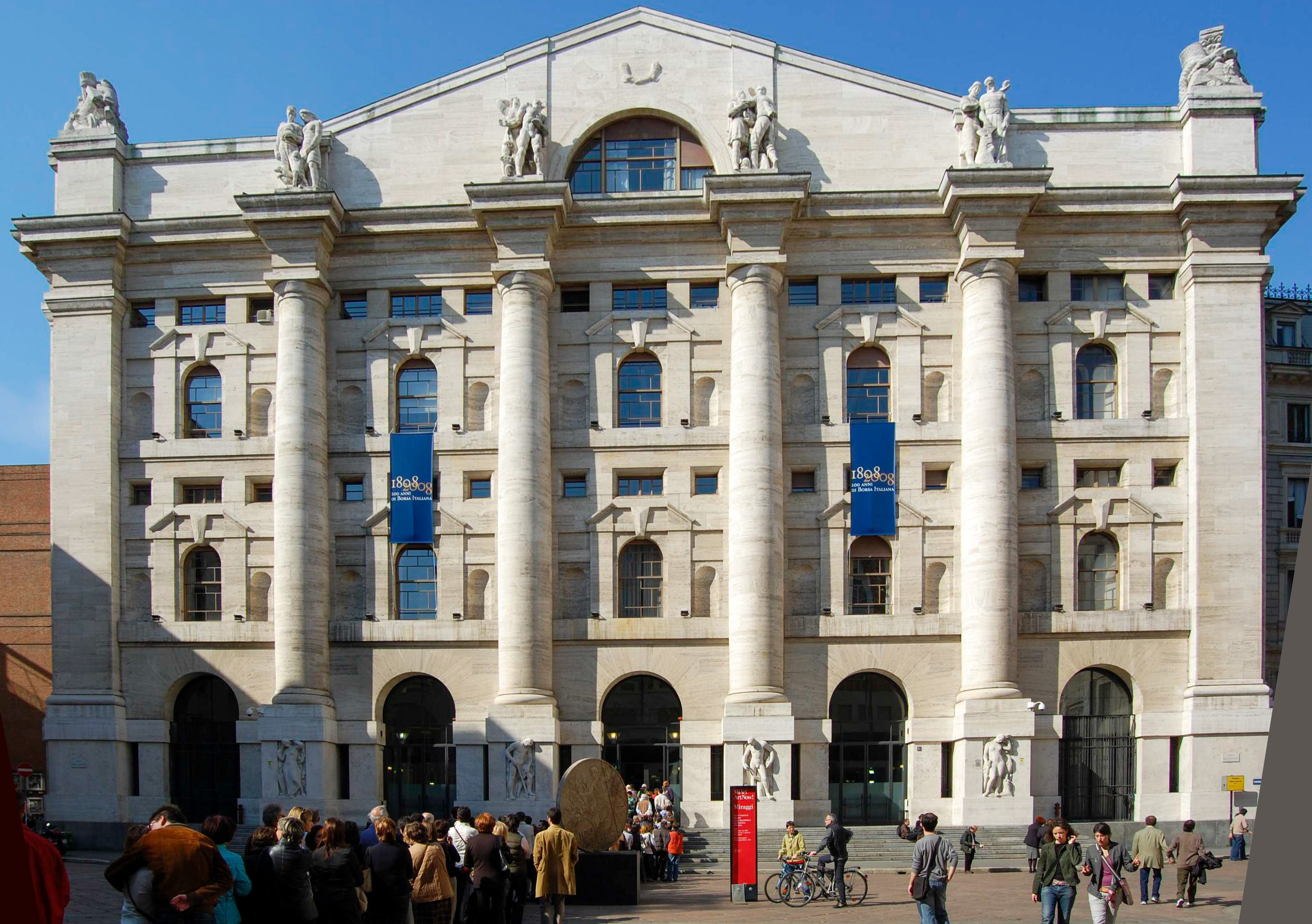
Palazzo Mezzanotte, the seat of the Italian stock exchange

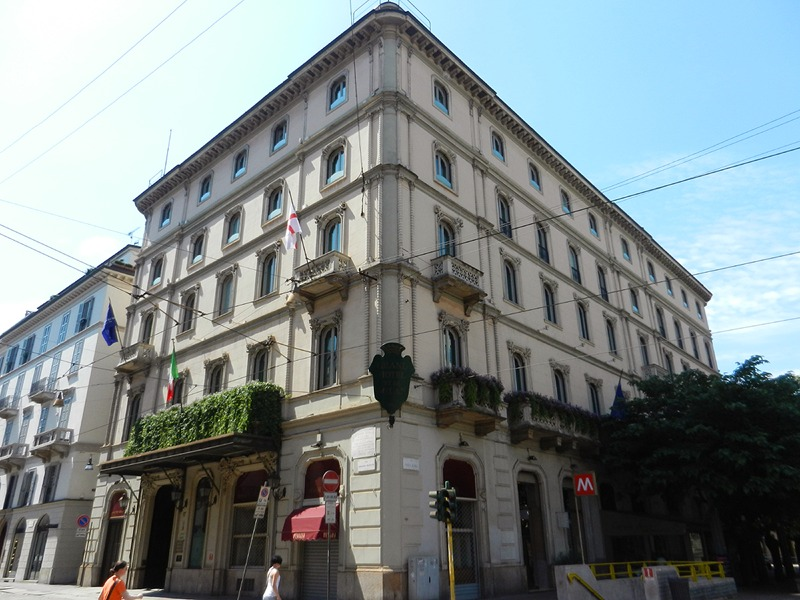
Grand Hotel et de Milan

Economy of Milan

- Banking in Milan
  - Borsa Italiana
- Business district of Milan
  - CityLife
  - Porta Nuova
- Hotels in Milan
  - Grand Hotel et de Milan
  - Principe di Savoia
  - Town House Galleria
- Restaurants and cafés in Milan
  - Caffè Cova
  - Cracco Peck
- Tourism in Milan
  - Touring Club Italiano

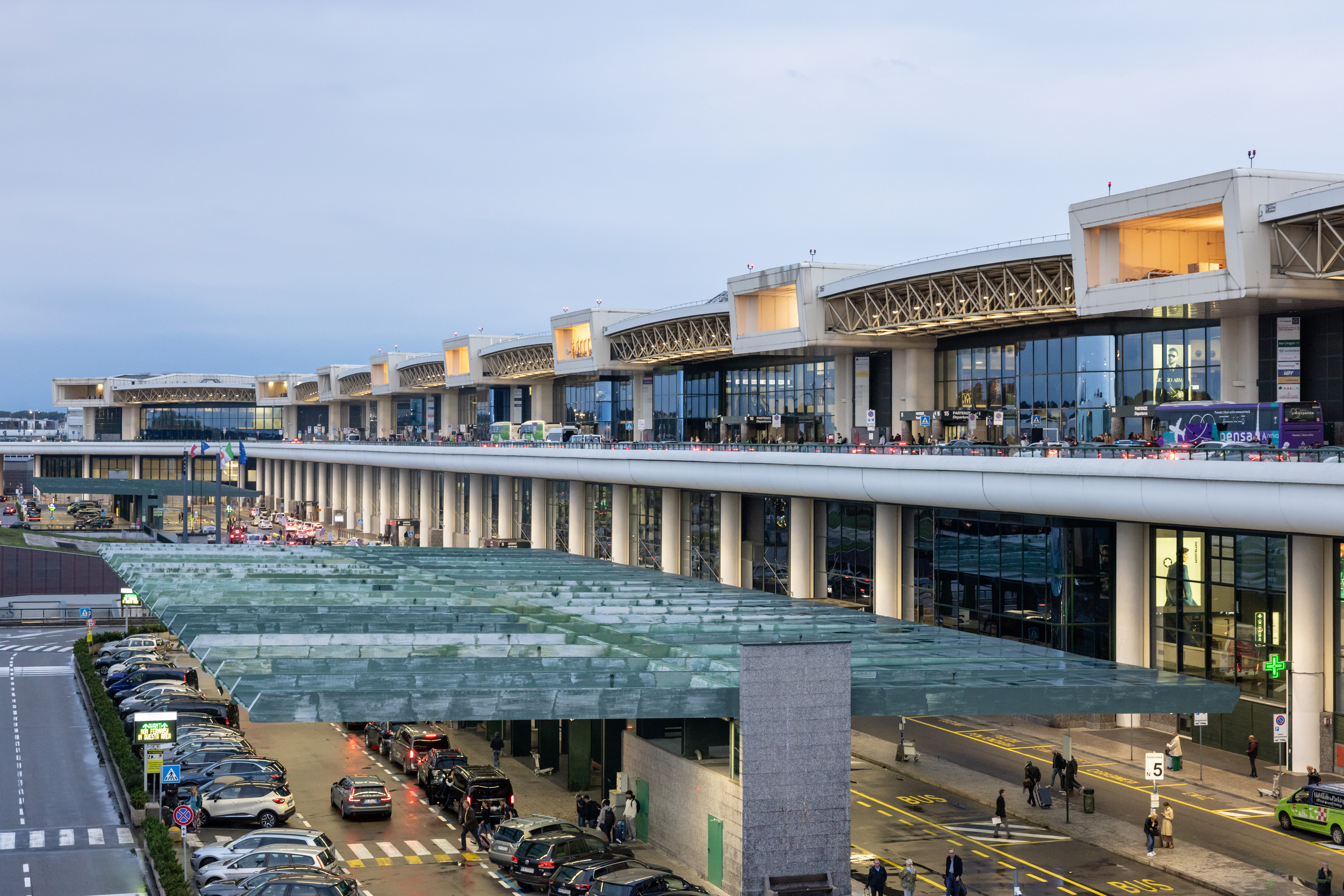
Milan Malpensa Airport

=== Transportation in Milan ===
Transport in Milan Airports in Milan

- Linate Airport
- Milan Malpensa Airport
  - Malpensa Express

==== Rail transport in Milan ====
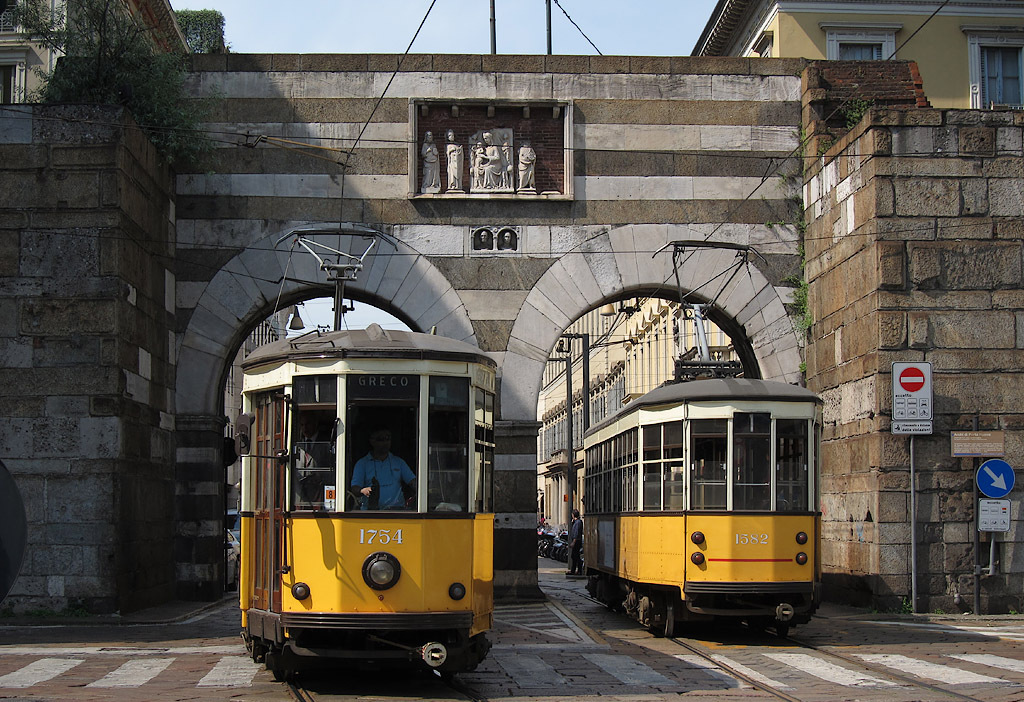
Intersecting trams under the arcs of Porta Nuova medieval gate. This type of historical trams are also used in San Francisco, United States

- ATM (Azienda Trasporti Milanesi)
- Trenord
- Railway stations in Milan
  - Milan Central railway station
- Trams in Milan
- Trolleybuses in Milan

===== Milan Metro =====
Milan Metro

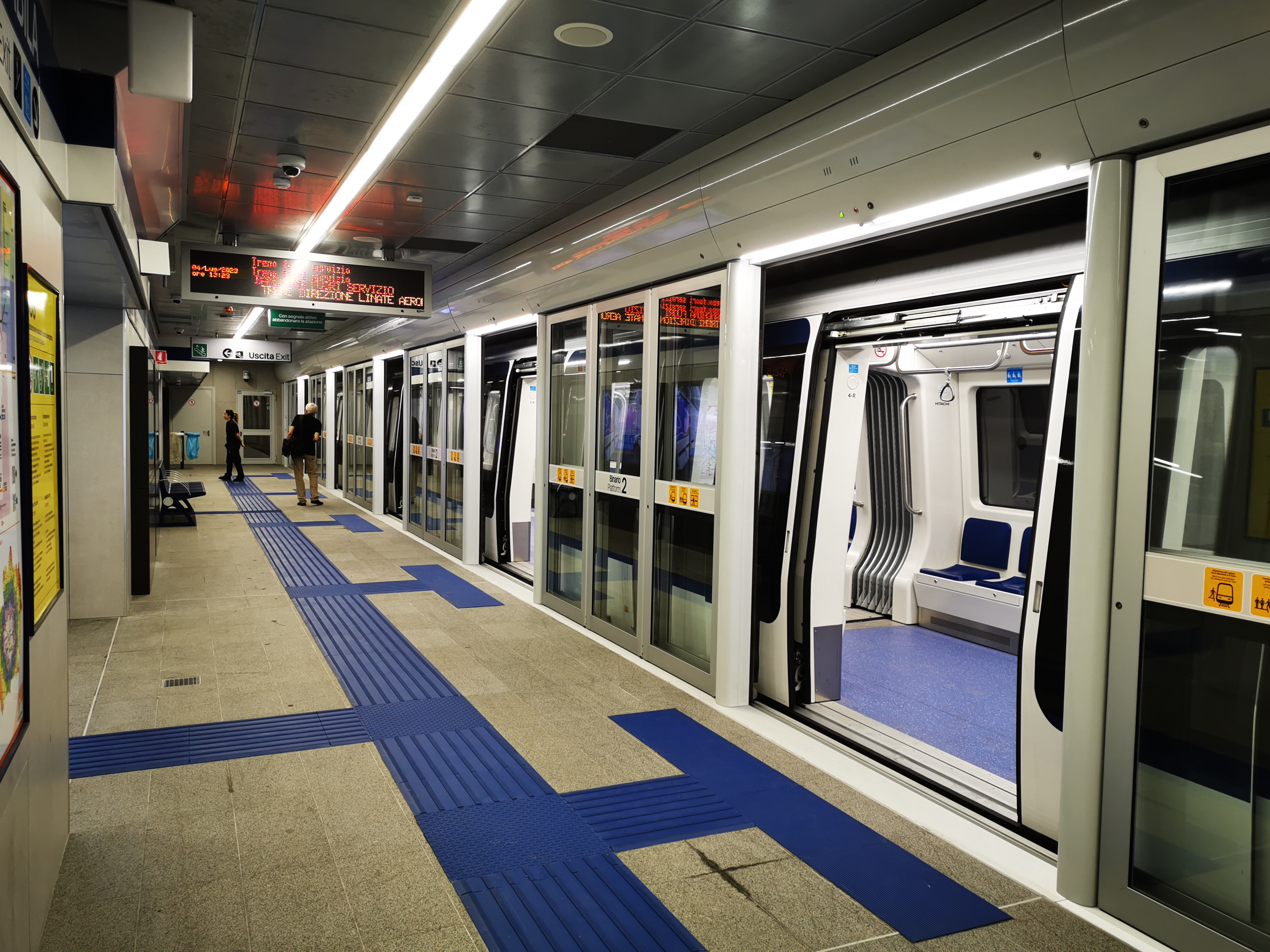
Milan Metro is the largest rapid transit system in Italy in terms of length, number of stations and ridership; and the fifth longest in the European Union and the eighth in the Europe.

- List of Milan Metro stations
- AnsaldoBreda Meneghino

===== Milan suburban railway service =====
Suburban railway

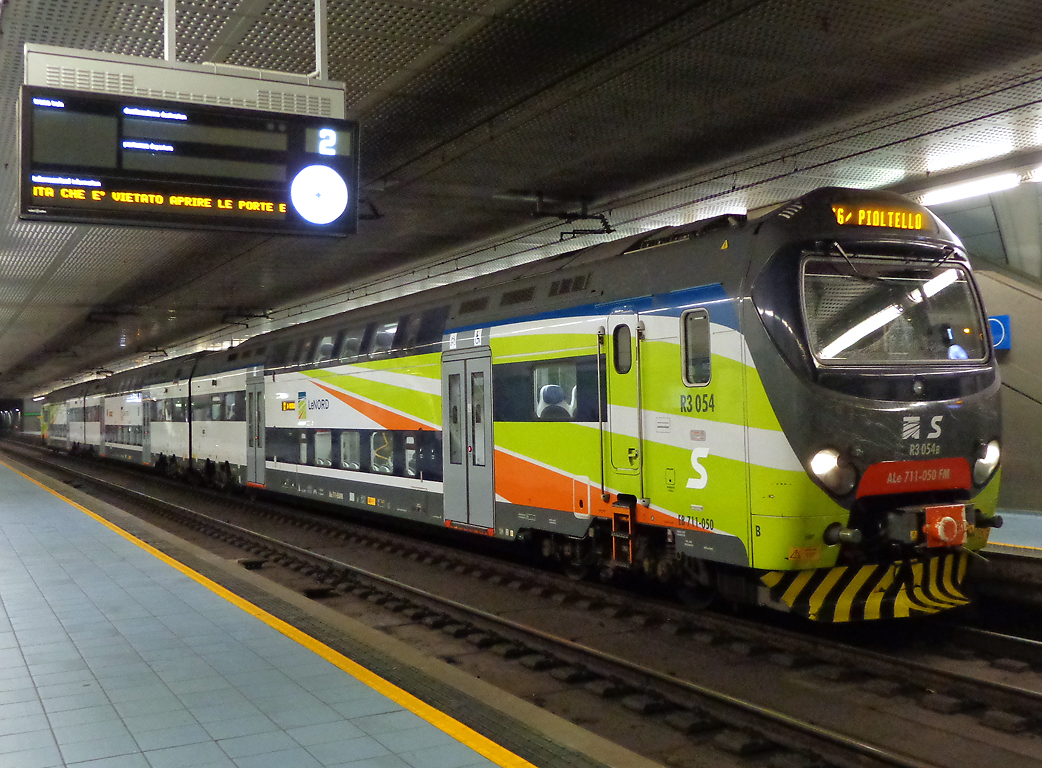
A TSR train at Milano Porta Venezia railway station on the Milan Passerby railway

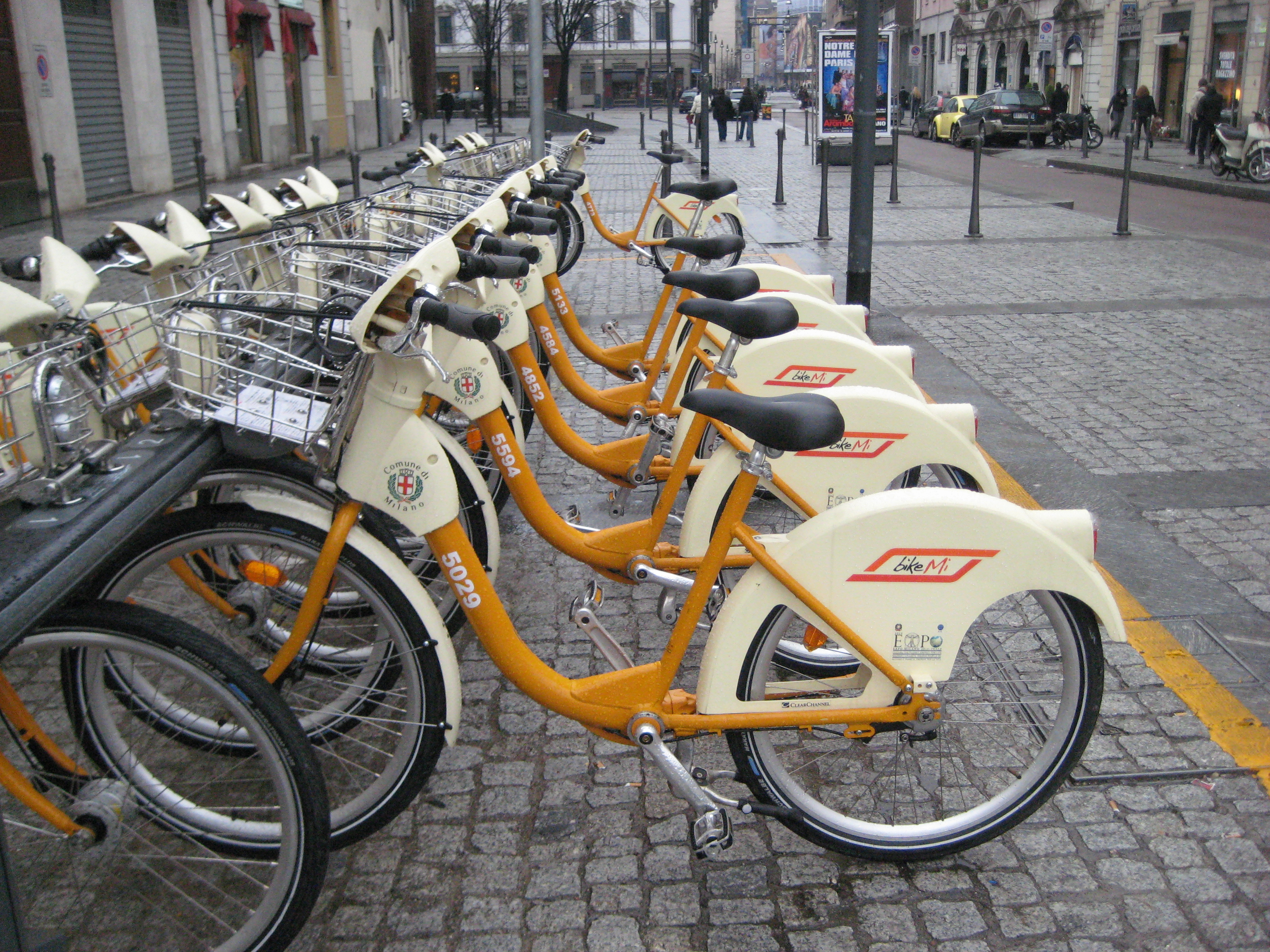
BikeMi, a public bicycle sharing system in Milan

- List of Milan suburban railway stations
- Milan Passante railway
- Treno Servizio Regionale

===== Bicycle sharing systems in Milan =====
- BikeMi
- Mobike

== Education in Milan ==
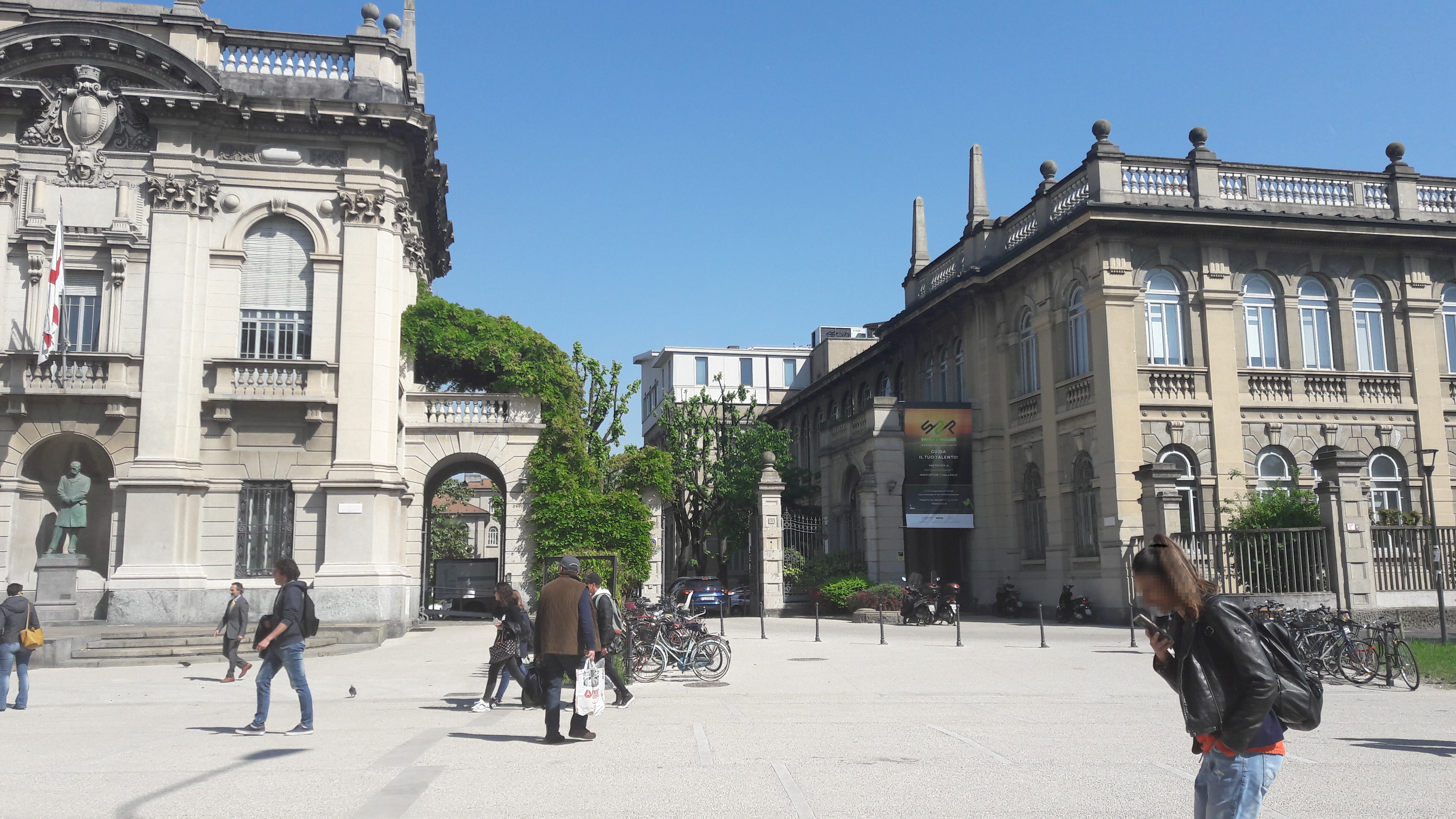
The Polytechnic University of Milan, the best university in Italy

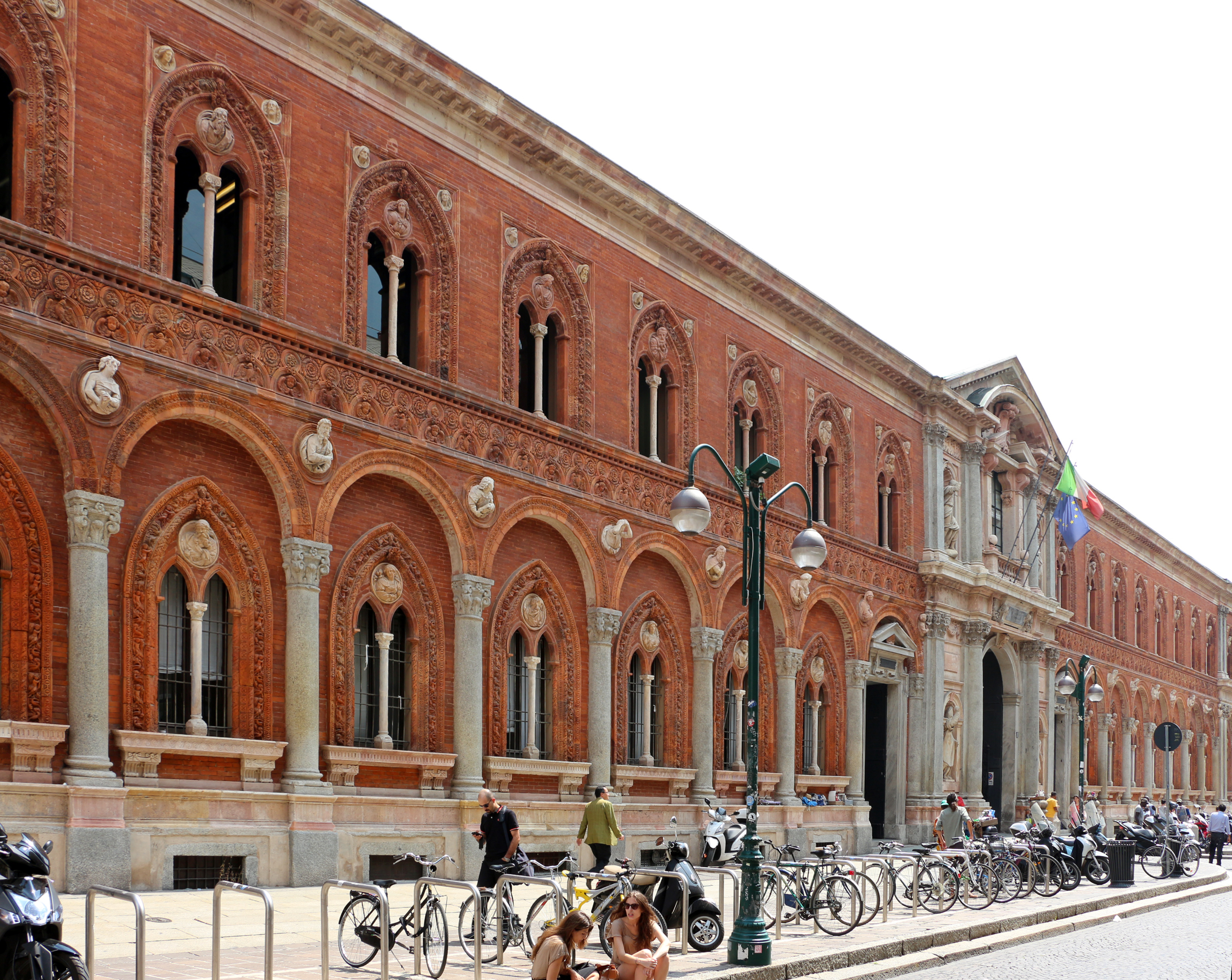
University of Milan headquarters

Education in Milan

- Public education in Milan
  - Academies in Milan
    - Brera Academy
  - Conservatories in Milan
    - Milan Conservatory
  - Universities in Milan
    - Public
      - University of Milan
      - University of Milan Bicocca
      - Polytechnic University of Milan
    - Private
      - Università Cattolica del Sacro Cuore
      - IULM University of Milan
      - Bocconi University
        - Bocconi University School of Law
      - Vita-Salute San Raffaele University
      - Humanitas University

== Healthcare in Milan ==
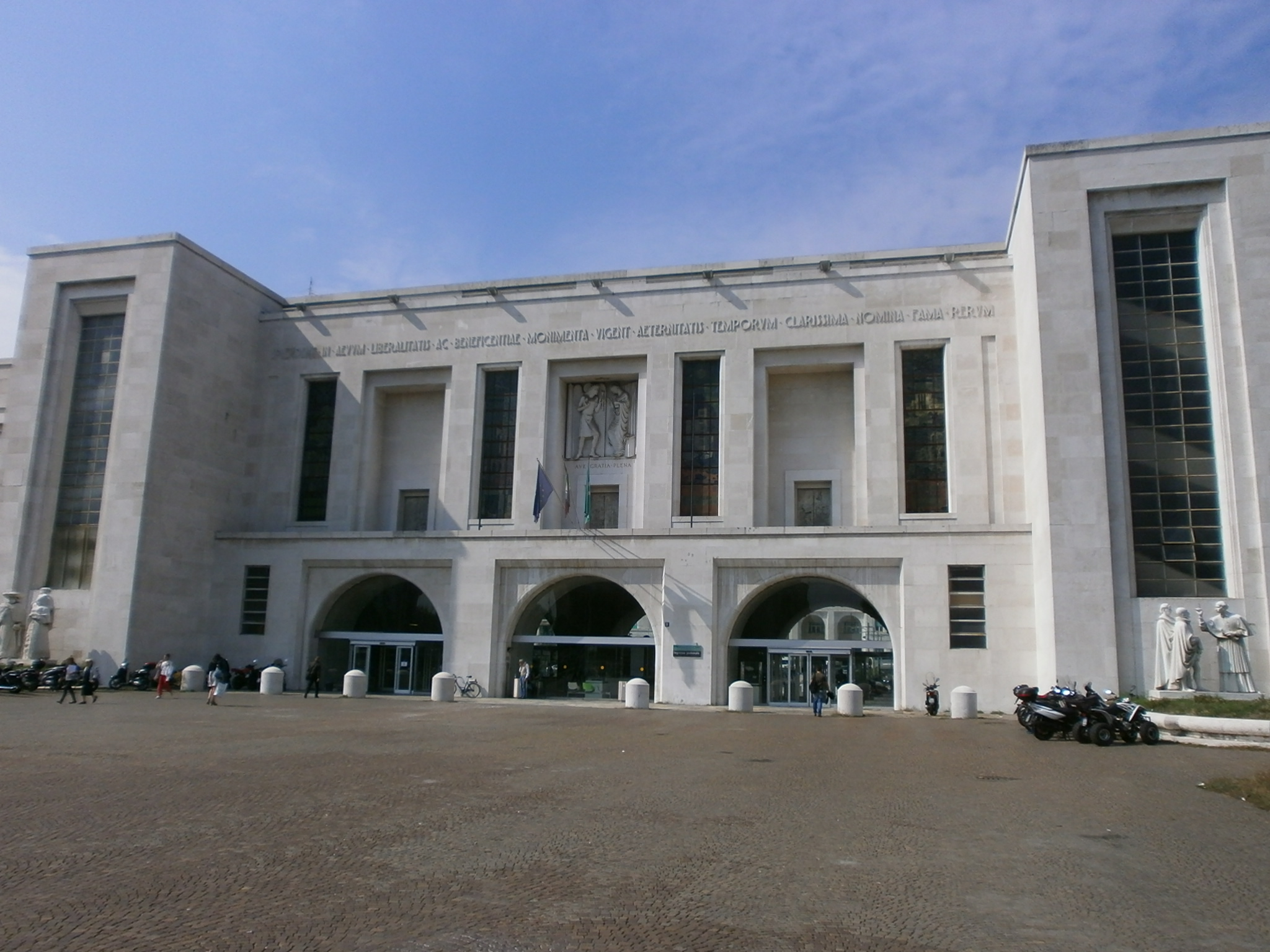
Ospedale Niguarda Ca' Granda

Hospitals in Milan

- Ospedale Niguarda Ca' Granda
- Policlinico of Milan
- San Raffaele Hospital
- European Institute of Oncology
- Martinitt
- Ospedale Luigi Sacco
- Pio Albergo Trivulzio

== See also ==
- Outline of geography
- Outline of Italy
