= Morivione =

Coordinates: 45°26′33″N 9°11′17″E

- Quartier of Milan
- Interactive map of Morivione
- Country: Italy
- Region: Lombardy
- Province: Milan
- Comune: Milan
- Zone: 5
- Time zone: UTC+1 (CET)
  - Summer (DST): UTC+2 (CEST)

Morivione is a district ("quartiere") of the city of Milan, Italy, part of the Zone 5 administrative division, located south of the city centre. It is informally defined as the area enclosed within four streets, namely Viale Toscana, Via Ripamonti, Via Antonini and Via Bazzi. The district is especially associated to the celebrations in honour of Saint George, where Milanese people would traditionally drink milk and eat a kind of sweet called pan de mein ("millet bread").

The name "Morivione" is supposedly a reference to a brigant named Vione Squilletti who would raid the Milanese country between the 13th and 14th century. According to a local legend, he was captured and sentenced to death on 24 April 1339; the next day, a commemorative painting of Saint George killing a dragon was made, with the phrase "qui morì Vione" ("here died Vione"), hence "Morivione".

The district main street is the eponymous Via Morivione, which is also the last remnant of the ancient borgo; the street connects Morivione to Milan going through what used to be Porta Lodovica, one the city gates of the Spanish walls of Milan. The rest of the district is mainly a residential and tertiary area.

== Transport ==
La stazione di Milano Tibaldi fa parte, insieme alla stazione di Porta Romana, del progetto della Circle Line di Milano, la nuova metropolitana di superficie di Milano, sul modello della metropolitana di Londra detta Linea Circle.

== Economy ==
Lufthansa Italia has its head office in the Centro Leoni complex in the district.
