= Porta Lodovica =

District of Milan in Lombardy, Italy

Coordinates: 45°27′08″N 9°11′12″E

- Quartiere of Milan
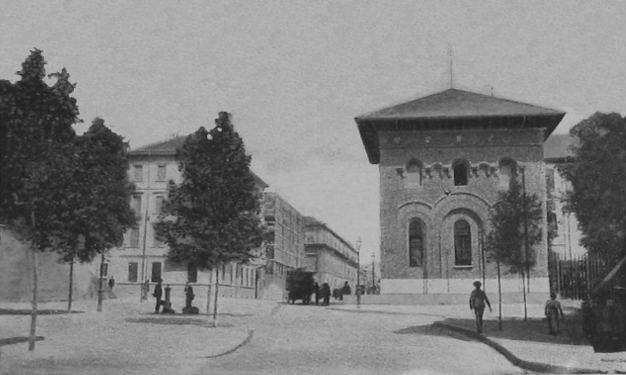
- A rare image of the Porta Lodovica toll booth.
- Interactive map of Porta Lodovica
- Country: Italy
- Region: Lombardy
- Province: Milan
- Comune: Milan
- Zone: 5
- Time zone: UTC+1 (CET)
  - Summer (DST): UTC+2 (CEST)

Porta Lodovica was a city gate of the Spanish walls of Milan, Italy, named after Ludovico Sforza. According to a survey conducted by Scenari Immobiliari in 2020, this area is in first place in the ranking of the neighborhoods that offer the best liveability in Milan.

Today, the name refers to the district (quartiere) of Milan where the gate used to be, which is part of the Zone 5 administrative division. The gate was demolished at the end of the 19th century. Plans were made to rebuild it inside the Parco di Monza city park in Monza, but they were not implemented.

== The gate ==
A "Porta Lodovica", roughly facing the same direction as that of the Spanish walls of Milan, was already part of the city's medieval walls. It was located by the postern of Saint Euphemia. The gate was named after Ludovico Sforza because he had the idea of enlarging the former "Porta di Sant'Eufemia" to facilitate access to the Santa Maria presso San Celso sanctuary, which was visited by many pilgrims. An inscription on the medieval Porta Lodovica read: "Ludovico Maria Sforza opened this gate, named Lodovica after him, together with his wife Beatrice, so that that religious rushing up of his citizens to the house of Mary, Mother of God, be easier and shorter".

When the medieval walls were replaced by the Spanish walls, the old Porta Lodovica was demolished and the new one was built.

In the late 19th century, when new districts developed in the periphery of Milan, several gates and several tracts of the city walls were demolished to make traffic easier. Porta Lodovica was demolished in 1905.

== The district ==
The district of Porta Lodovica marks the transition from the historic centre to the "Bastions", i.e., the part of the city that was enclosed by the Spanish walls. Major streets in the area include Via Col Di Lana, Viale Gian Galeazzo, Viale Beatrice d'Este, and Viale Bligny. The Bocconi University has its headquarters in this district.
