= Medieval Porta Ticinese =

Coordinates: 45°27′27.3″N 9°10′51.3″E

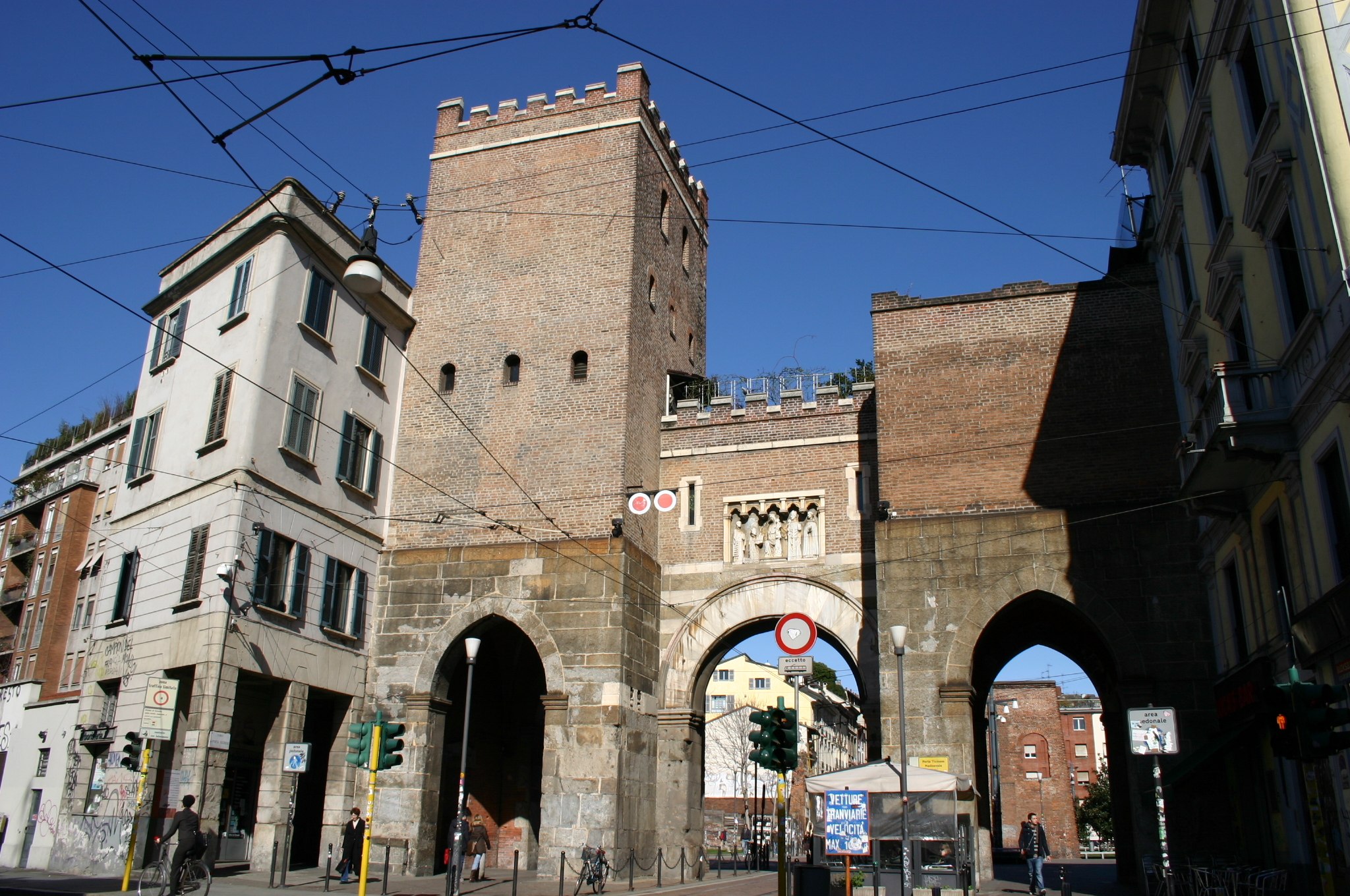
- Medieval Porta (city gate) Ticinese
- Interactive map of Medieval Porta Ticinese
- Country: Italy
- Region: Lombardy
- Municipality: Milan
- Construction: 12th century (restored in 1861)

The Medieval Porta Ticinese (Porta Ticinese Medievale) is a gate of the former 12th-century Walls of Milan; it is located at the intersection of the Corso di Porta Ticinese and Via Edmondo de Amicis (running to west) and Via Molino di Armi (running to east) in the city center of Milan, region of Lombardy, Italy. This is one of the three remaining medieval gates of Milan. The others are Porta Nuova and the Pusterla di Sant'Ambrogio.

Originally built in the twelfth century, this Gothic style, merlion-topped gate and tower stood on the inner side of a navigable moat (cerchio dei navigli) that ringed the city. The structures we see today were stripped of accumulating houses and refurbished as see them now in 1861 by Camillo Boito. He inserted the two lateral gothic arches flanking the original central passage. The canal was filled in over the last century creating the intersecting avenues of Amicis and Molion di Armi. As the city grew, by the 16th-century, a second moated set of walls with a second distinct Porta Ticinese developed some 500 meters to the South at the site known as the Darsena del Naviglio, or Port of the Canal, and then replaced over in the 19th century with a neoclassical structure by Luigi Cagnola.

The medieval Porta Ticinese is sited near the Basilica of Saint Lawrence and the homonymous Saint Lawrence columns. Among the city's population it was commonly referred to as "Porta Cicca" or "porta Snesa". The first is the adaptation of the Spanish word "chica", meaning little girl, since the gate was the only one having just one access, whereas the latter is a dialectical form of its name. Around the corner on via Amicis is the installation of Wall of Dolls.
