= Santa Maria alla Porta, Milan =

Coordinates: 45°27′56″N 9°10′53″E

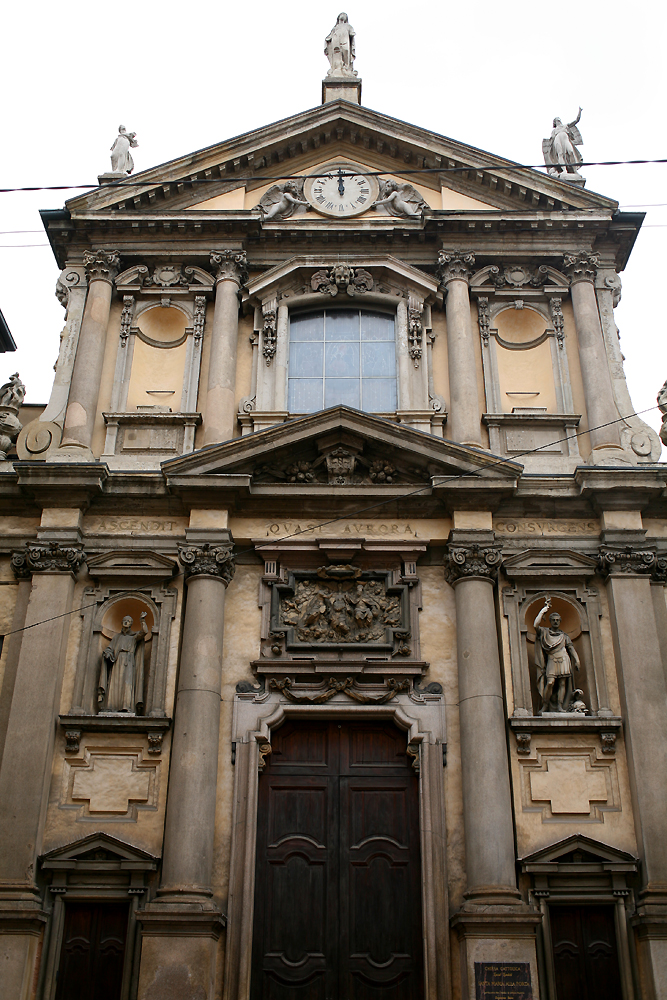
- Santa Maria alla Porta, Milan
- Location: Milan
- Country: Italy
- Denomination: Catholic Christian of the Abrosian Rite

History
- Consecrated: 1652

Architecture
- Architect(s): Francesco Maria Richini, Francesco Castelli
- Architectural type: Baroque

Administration
- Archdiocese: Milan

Santa Maria alla Porta is a church in Milan, Italy.

Although a church already stood in the same Milanese location since before the year 1105, the present church was erected in 1652 under Spanish rule. It was designed by architect Francesco Maria Richini, and after his death in 1658, the project was completed by Francesco Castelli—the original architect and engineer from Mendrisiotto (not to be confused with Francesco Castelli, colloquially known as "il Borromini") responsible for the construction of the Baroque gate and of the towering tympanum. The church owes its toponym "alla porta" [at the gate] to its construction where the old Porta Vercellina stood, as part of the wall erected in the Republican era by Augustus. The road facing the church, via Santa Maria alla Porta, was part of the decumanus (the east/west oriented road) that led from San Sepolcro Square to Porta Vercellina.

It is a parish church in the Archdiocese of Milan which serves the Polish-Milanese community.

== History ==
According to a historical testimony by Landolfo Luniore (1077-1137), known as Landolfo di San Paolo, in his Historia Mediolanensis [History of Milan], it seems that the church of Sancta Maria ad Portam already existed before the 12th century in the same place where it stands today. It would have served as a minor church, though, since it was neither a Decuman church nor the place of litanies. Landolfo in the same work reported that on May 7, 1105, during the demolition of the pre-existing church, precious relics were discovered, among which were a part of Jesus’ burial clothes and his Holy Shroud, a piece of the stone on which the angel who announced the resurrection was seated, a splinter of the Holy Cross, and a fragment of Mary's dress.

"Putavi non pretereundum scilentio, quod durante lite Grosulani, scilicet 1105 7 idus maiis, invente sunt reliquie pretiose in Ecclesia Sancte Marie ad Portam". ["I thought that cannot be passed silently that during the Grosulani dispute, of course, May 7, 1105, there were precious relics at the Church Sancte Marie ad Portam"]

Another historian named Torre mentions the same relics in 1674, and also records the presence of the venerated bones of sub-deacons, Saints Casto and Polimio.

The miraculous finding gave origin to the "Festa del Salvatore" [Feast of the Savior], which was celebrated every 9 May with a procession that went from the church of Saint Tecla to Santa Maria alla Porta. The parishioners would wave fresh fronds and carry candles while reciting aloud the word agios (holy, pure), which was the original name of the popular Festa dell'agios (Feast of the Holy/Pure).

On December 8, 1651, when an external wall was being demolished as part of the reconstruction of the old church using Richini's design, they discovered a fresco depicting the Virgin Mary with the baby Jesus on her lap, called the Madonna del grembiule [the Virgin of the Apron]. The discovery created an influx of donations from parishioners to ensure the renovation of the church. The result was its single nave architectural plan from 1652.

Little would be known about the appearance of the church before Richini's reconstruction if it were not for its description, including the building plan, which can be found in documents of Federico Borromeo's pastoral visit in 1605. The church is described as having three aisles/naves and a shape of a cross, and facing the east. In total, it was around 65 feet long and 26 feet wide, decorated with frescoes by Luini and Bramante.

The facade was finally restored in 1856, after the completion of the restoration of the building, the floors with the burial sites underneath, and the surrounding spaces that parish priest, Alberto De Capitani d'Arzago had started in 1854.

A plaque against the right wall of the church lists the priests of Santa Maria alla Porta. The first on the list is Marco Azzoni, active around 1450, but actually, Maffeo Monza, an active priest from 1536 to 1574, was the first priest with confirmed dates of activity.

== Architecture ==
The triangular tympanum by Borromini that adorns the beautiful Baroque facade, alternating between the Corinthian and Ionian Orders of columns, protects the exquisite high-relief by Carlo Simonetta, built in 1670 and depicting the Assumption of Mary (dedicated as Mariæ Assumptæ). Underneath the tympanum, the Order is supported by a large granite pedestal, with the inscription, ascendit quasi aurora consurgens. On the sides, the niches are occupied by two sculptures of figures, completed by Giacomo Moraglia (1791-1860). Barely visible from the street is a small dome that covers the church, perhaps made by Girolamo Quadrio and that hosts, in the carved-out niches, four statues of angels by Giuseppe Vismara and Simonetta, sculpted in 1662.

The single nave is not very wide and has four side chapels adorned with white marble statues; the altar of Magdalene is decorated by Stefano Sampietro; in the sacristy is the work by Camillo Procaccini (rarely visible because of the infrequent openings of the church).

== 1943 bombing and present day ==
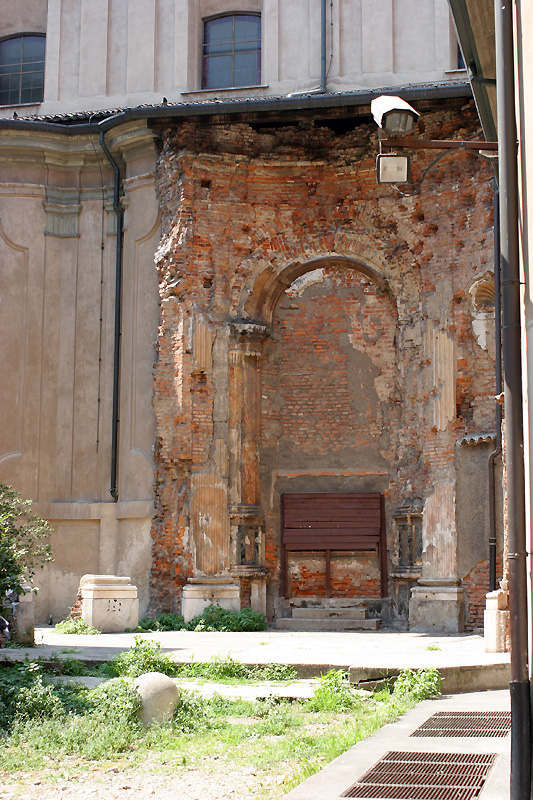
The remains of the chapel of the Madonna del Grembiule, on the right-hand side of the temple, first restored in 2015

In the night between the 12th and 13 August in 1943, the church, sharing the fate of many other Milanese churches, was heavily damaged by Anglo-American aerial bombs of World War II: three explosive bombs demolished the shrine of the Madonna — erected in 1704 and later used in the baptistery — the historical building to the left of the church and the group of historical buildings to the right of the temple (which, today, is Luigi Caccia Dominioni's historical building from 1961), destroying the shrine, its seventeenth-century furniture and the sixteenth-century fresco of the Madonna del Grembiule which were all found inside. Even now, holes and chips caused by shrapnel are visible on the exterior and the red granite columns, leaving the high-relief of the Simonetta extensively damaged and mutilated in some of its protruding parts.

Only some scattered ruins to the right of the church remain of the shrine today, which were restored as part of a three-year project, which was completed in November 2015. During the renovation of the street Via Santa Maria alla Porta, the original marble floor was also found, but it was covered again for the lack of necessary funds. The fresco, Madonna del Grembiule or Madonna dei Miracoli was also discovered, which was previously protected by a wooden display case, but today was restored and given back at the devotion of parishioners. However, an engraving by Marc'Antonio Dal Re (1697-1766) and some rare photographs clearly show the structure that was later destroyed.

The two 19th-century central statues of angels set atop the tympanum and the statues set in the two niches of the second order that are visible in some photographs at the beginning of the 20th century are also missing.

Santa Maria alla Porta is chantry for the Polish-speaking parishioners as shown on a plaque located at the side of the entrance.

== Bibliography ==
- Landulphi Junioris sive de Sancto Paulo (1934). "Historia Mediolanensis ab anno MXCV usque ad annum MCXXXVII". In Carlo Castiglioni (ed.). Rerum Italicarum Scriptores. Vol. V/3. Bologna: Zanichelli.
- Poli Vignolo, Claudia (1997). "Chiesa di Santa Maria alla Porta". Arte Lombarda (121). Milan: Istituto per la Storia dell'Arte Lombarda: 110–112. Archived from the original on 2014-05-08. ISSN 0004-3443 (WC · ACNP). URL consultato l'8 maggio 2014 (archiviato dall'url originale l'8 maggio 2014).
- Anna Ceresa Mori, ed. (1986). Santa Maria alla Porta: un scavo nel centro storico di Milano. Studi Archeologici dell'Istituto Universitario di Bergamo (5). Bergamo.
