= Archi di Porta Nuova =

Coordinates: 45°28′19.7″N 9°11′41.5″E

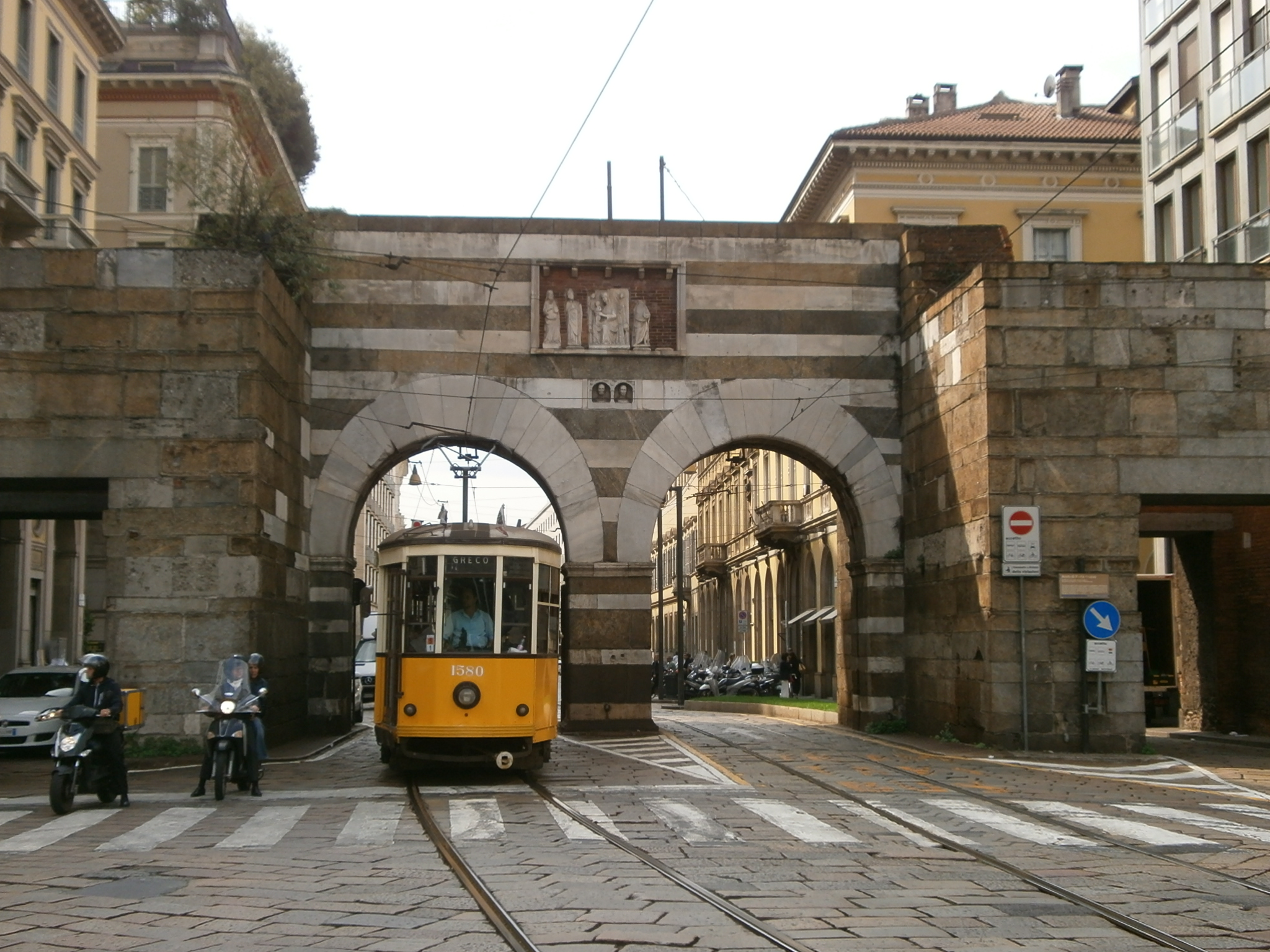
- The external facade of Porta Nuova medieval city gate.
- Interactive map of Archi di Porta Nuova
- Country: Italy
- Region: Lombardy
- Municipality: Milan
- Construction: 12th century (restored in 19th century)

Porta Nuova (pronounced [ˈpɔrta ˈnwɔːva]; literally "New Gate"; Milanese: Pòrta Noeuva [ˈpɔrta ˈnøːʋa]) is one of the three medieval gates of Milan that still exist in the modern city (together with the medieval Porta Ticinese and Pusterla di Sant'Ambrogio). It is sited along the ancient "Navigli Ring" on the perimeter of the medieval walls of the city.

Originally built in the twelfth century, Porta Nuova was restored in the nineteenth century with the insertion of two lateral passages next to the two central arcs and the addition of some ancient Roman steles on the external facade of the gate.

The external facade, overlooking Cavour Square (Piazza Cavour), preserve the original appearance with a marble shrine of the Madonna and Child with Saints.

== See also ==
- Walls of Milan

== Gallery ==
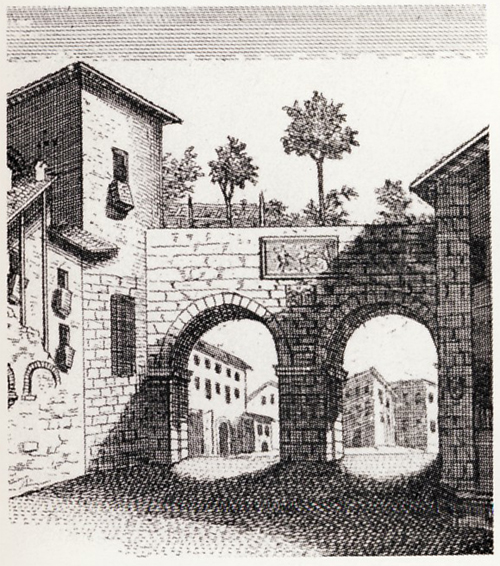
The original appearance of the gate.

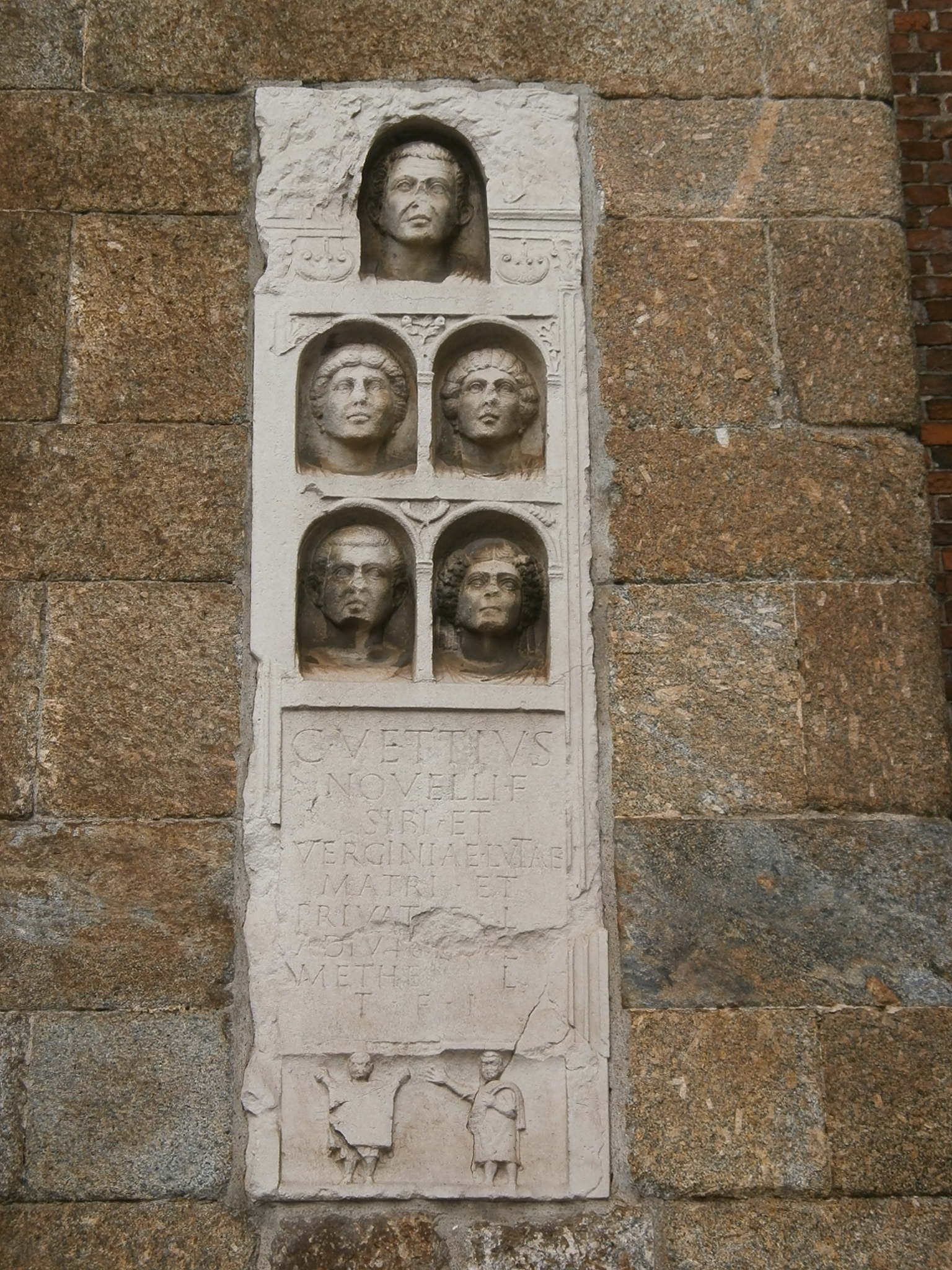
An ancient Roman stele on the facade of Porta Nuova.

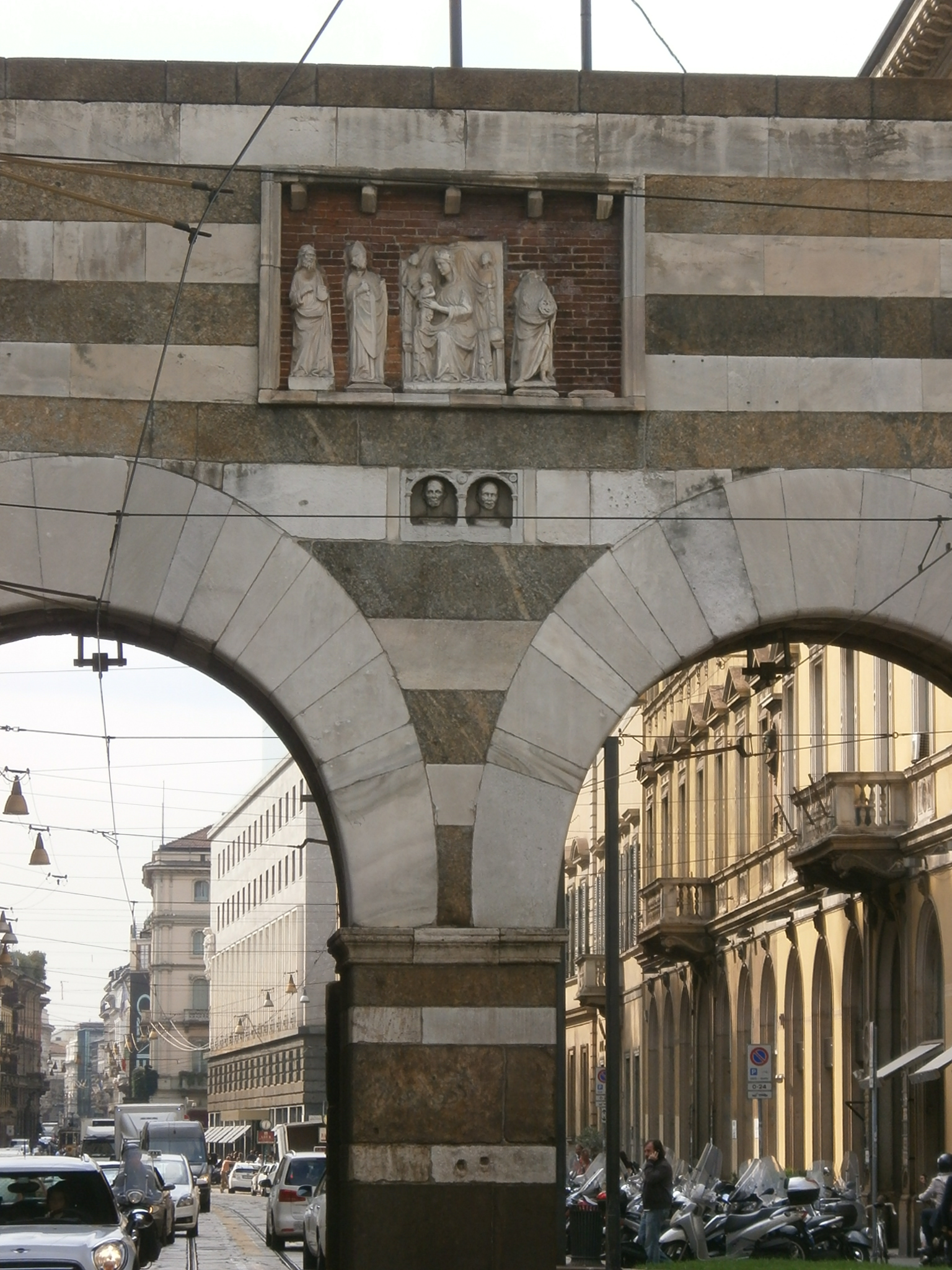
The marble shrine of the Madonna and Child with Saints.

== Sources ==
- Le città d'arte:Milano, Guide brevi Skira, ed.2008, autori vari. (Italian language edition)
- Milano e Provincia, Touring club Italiano, ed.2003, autori vari. (Italian language edition)
- Le lapidi di Porta Nuova, in AA.VV., La Porta Nuova delle mura medievali di Milano. Dai Novellii ad oggi venti secoli di storia milanese, a cura delle Civiche Raccolte Archeologiche e Numismatiche di Milano, Milano 1991, pp. 59–81. (Italian language paper)
