= Castello Cova =

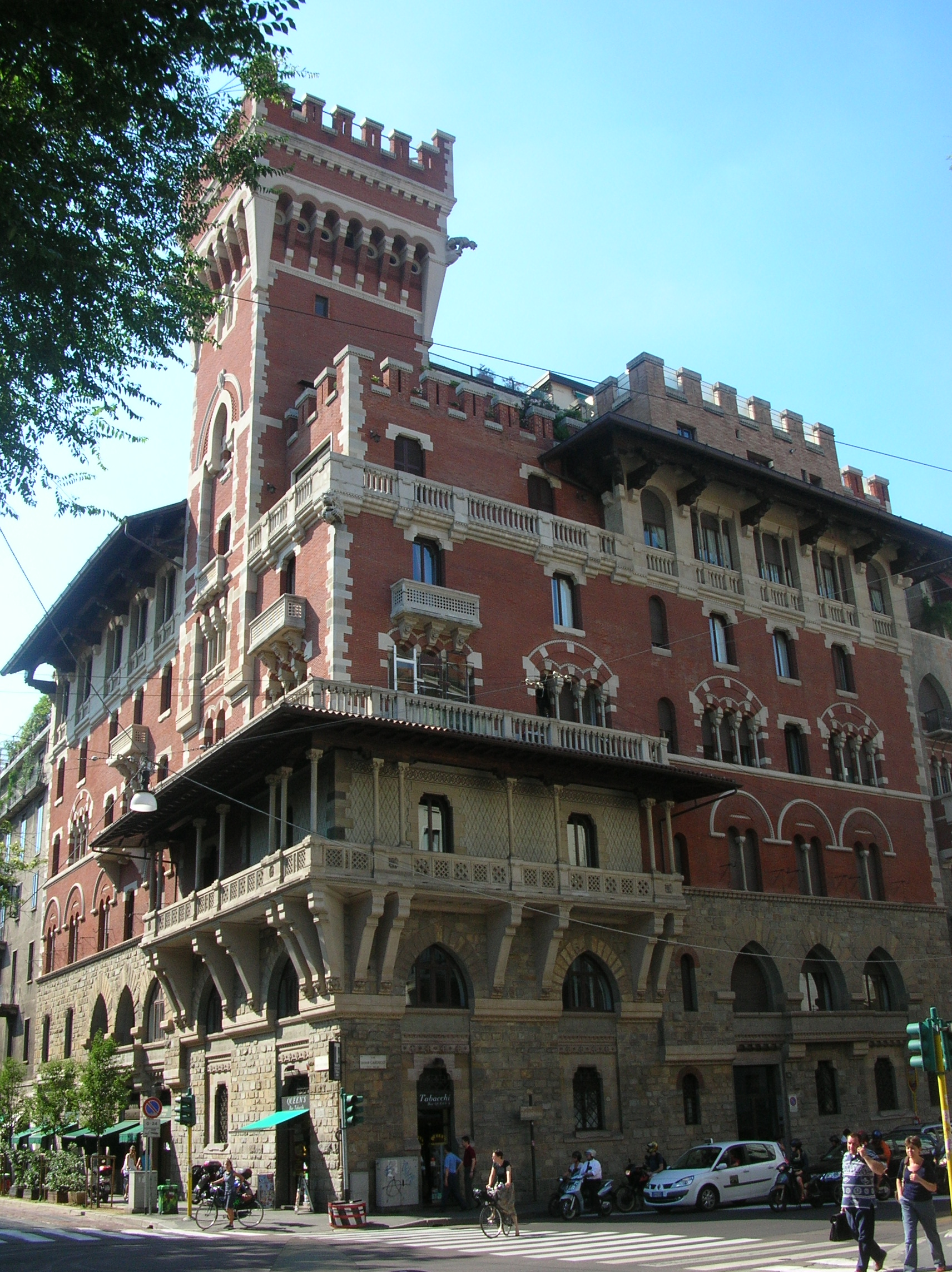

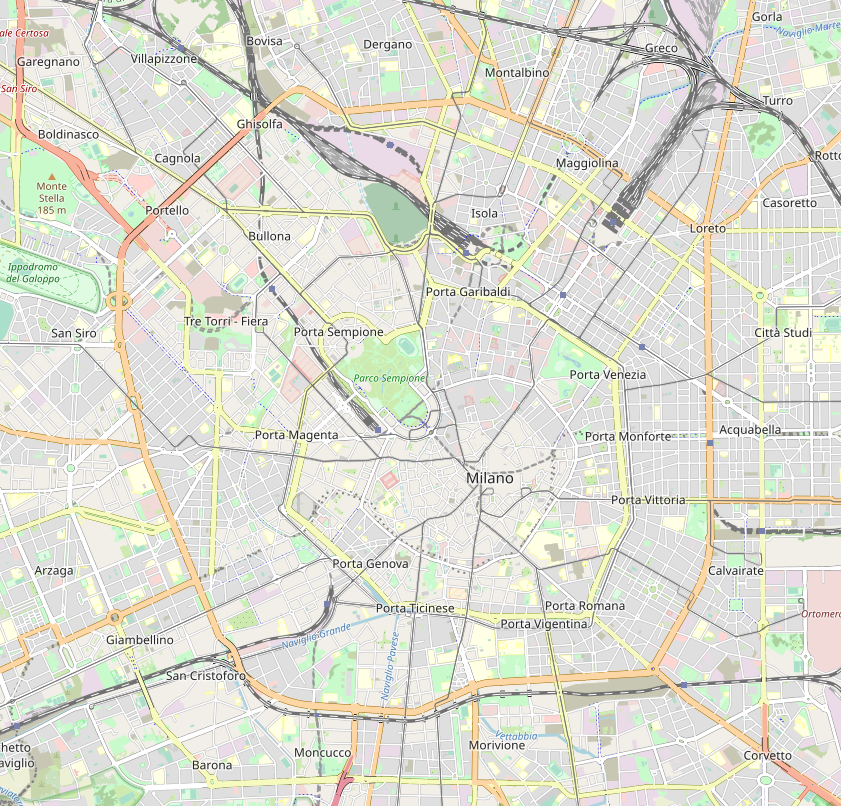
- Location within Milan Location within Italy

General information
- Location: Via Carducci, 36, Angolo Via San Vittore, 20123 Milano MI, Italy, Milan, Italy
- Coordinates: 45.46248°N 9.17361°E

Design and construction
- Architect: Adolfo Coppedè

Castello Cova ("Cova Castle"), also known as Palazzo Viviani Cova ("Viviani-Cova Palace") is a landmark Neo-Gothic style residential and business building located on Via Giosuè Carducci #36, in central Milan, region of Lombardy, Italy. It is located some 100 meters west of the Basilica of Sant'Ambrogio. The building was designed by architect Adolfo Coppedè (brother of the more famous Gino Coppedè). Adolfo's career is also noted for designing the Casa del Fascio in Signa, and he was never shy to indulge in the appropriation of former styles and symbols; this building notable for its height and accumulation of Gothic architecture motifs such as a merlionated tower, peaked and rusticated ground-floor arches, and mullion-windows. It sports numerous decorated balconies on the facade.

The tower of Castello Cova was reportedly an inspiration for the architects of the Velasca Tower, a landmark skyscraper in the centre of Milan. The Pusterla di Sant'Ambrogio, an ancient postern of the Medieval walls of Milan facing Castello Cova, was recreated in the late 1930s in a style that matches the Revival style of the Castello.

== Image Gallery ==
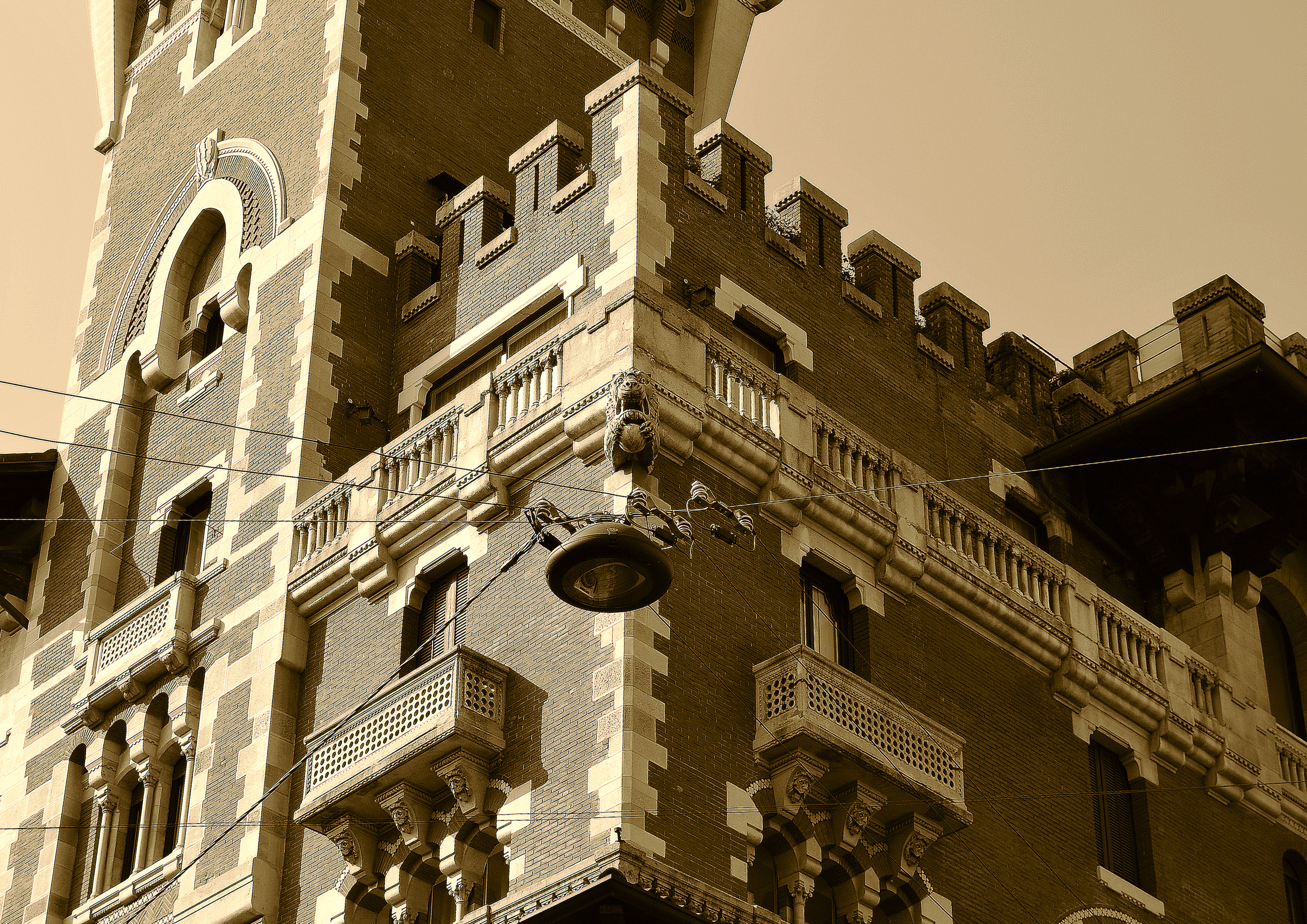
Castello Cova - Via Carducci

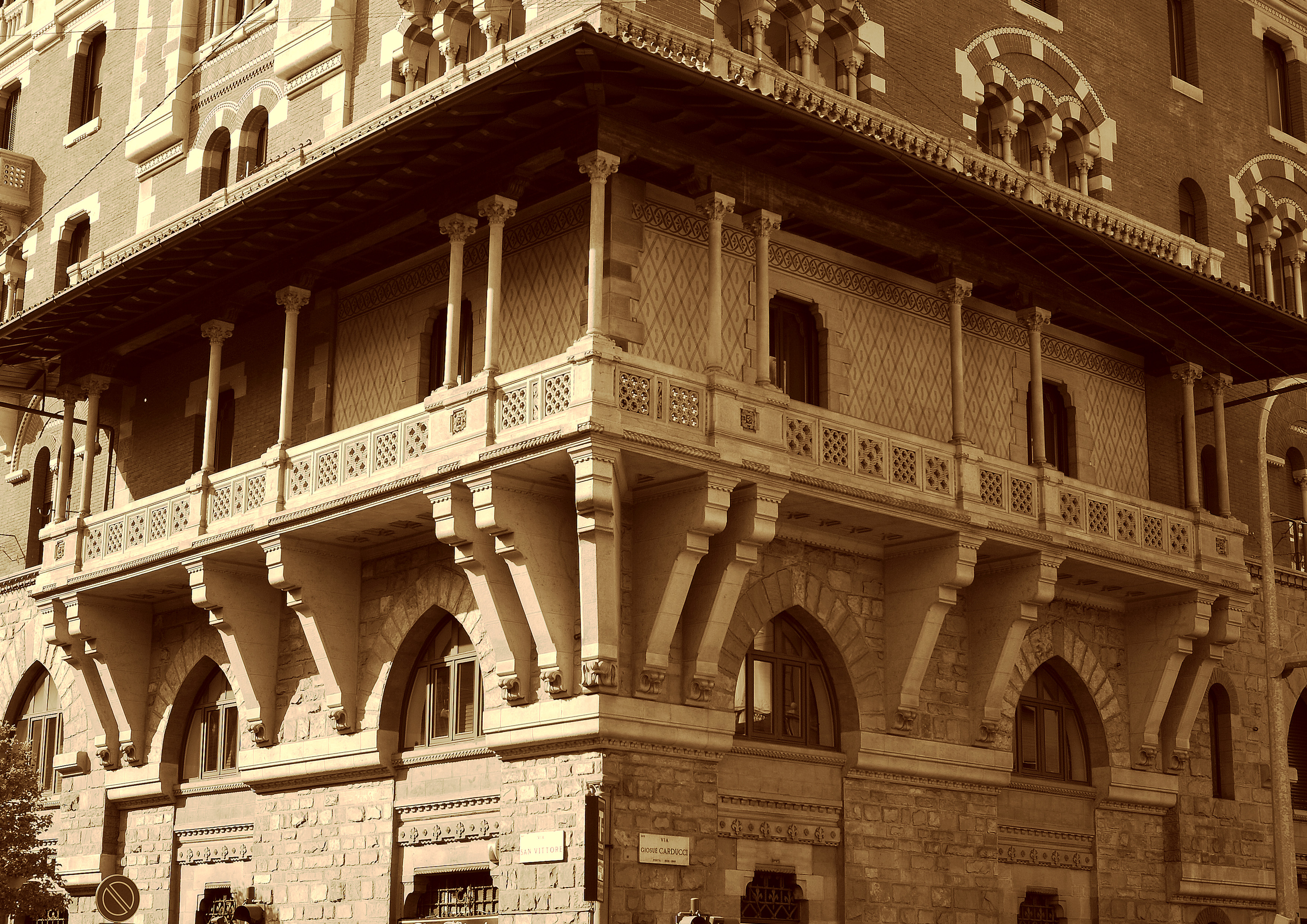
Castello Cova - Loggia

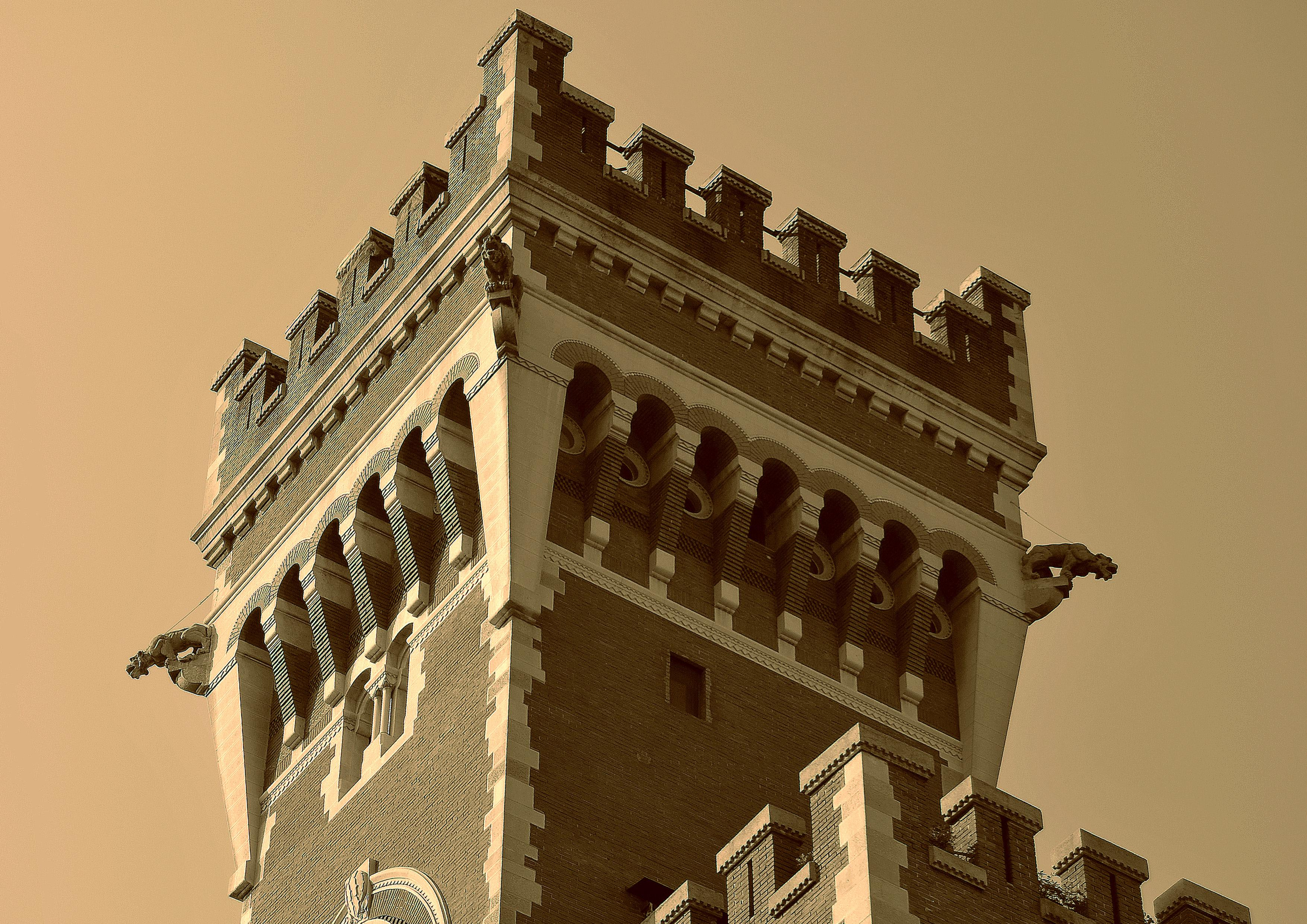
Castello Cova - Tower

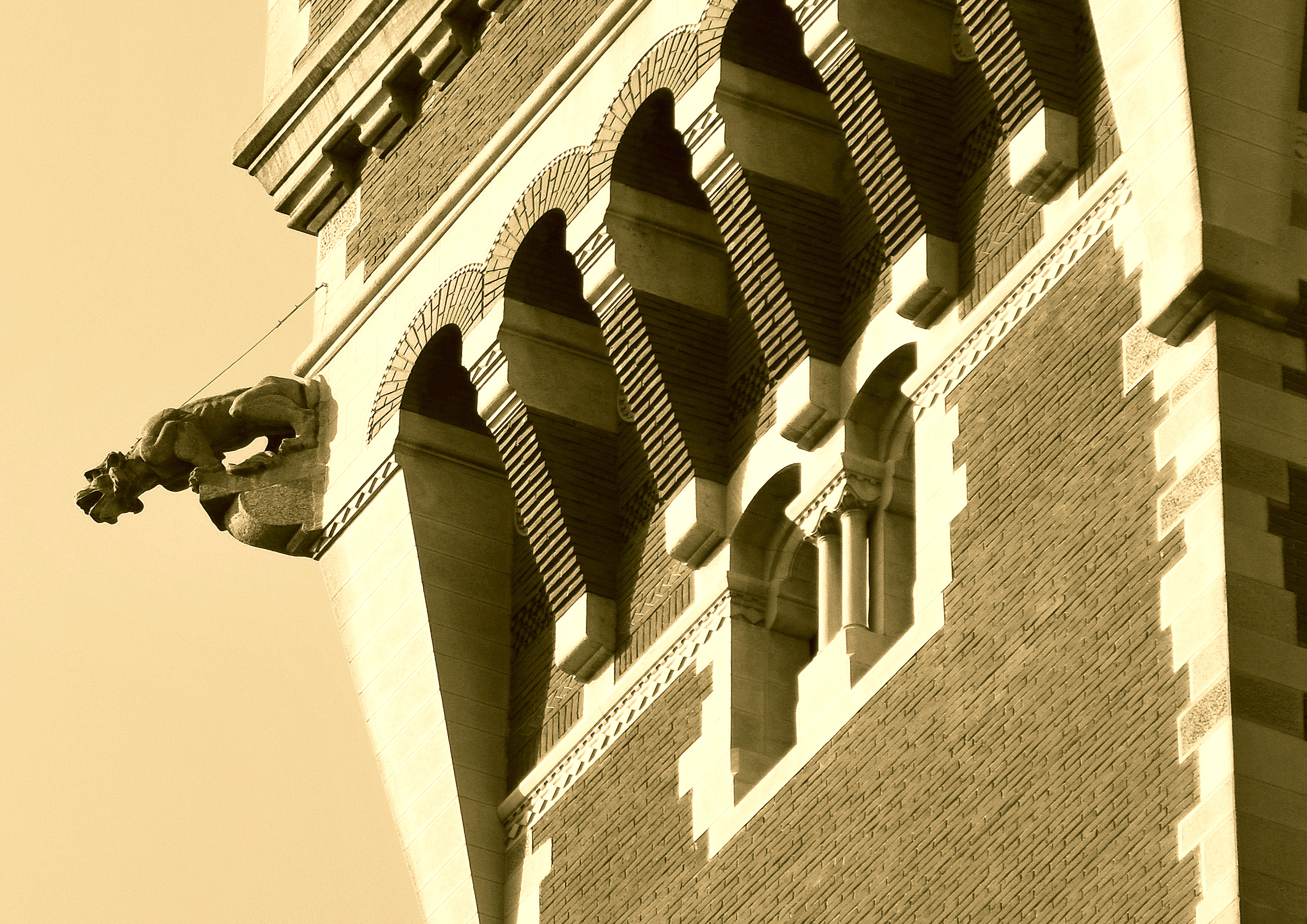
Castello Cova - Tower (detail)

== Sources ==
- Lanza, Attilia (1993). Milano e i suoi palazzi: Porta Vercellina, Comasina e Nuova. Libreria Meravigli Editrice.
