= Porta Ticinese =

Coordinates: 45°27′09″N 9°10′49″E

- Quartiere of Milan
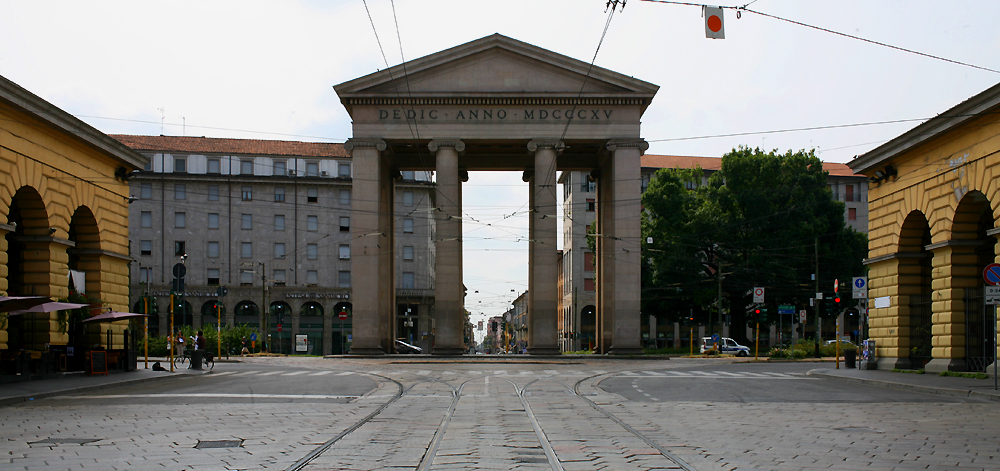
- The Porta Ticinese city gate
- Interactive map of Porta Ticinese
- Country: Italy
- Region: Lombardy
- Province: Milan
- Comune: Milan
- Zone: 6
- Time zone: UTC+1 (CET)
  - Summer (DST): UTC+2 (CEST)

Porta Ticinese (formerly known as Porta Cicca, and during Napoleonic rule as Porta Marengo) is a former city gate of Milan, Italy. The gate, facing south-west, was first created with the Spanish walls of the city, in the 16th century, but the original structure was later demolished and replaced in the early 19th century. The name "Porta Ticinese" is used both to refer to the gate proper and to the surrounding district, part of the Zone 6 administrative division. In the same district there is also a medieval gate with the same name, although in common speech the name "Porta Ticinese" is usually assumed to refer to the 19th century gate.

The gate of Porta Ticinese is one of the landmark buildings of Milan and a popular tourist attraction.

The name "Porta Ticinese" means "Gate to the Ticino", referred to the Ticino river, that traverses the Po Valley south-west of Milan. The name "Porta Cicca" came about during the Spanish rule of Milan in the 16th century, "Cicca" being a distortion of the Spanish word chica, i.e., "small". The name "Porta Marengo", which was used in the 19th century, refers to the village of Marengo located south-west of Milan, now called Spinetta Marengo, scene of the Battle of Marengo between the French army commanded by Napoleon and an Austrian army.

== The gate ==
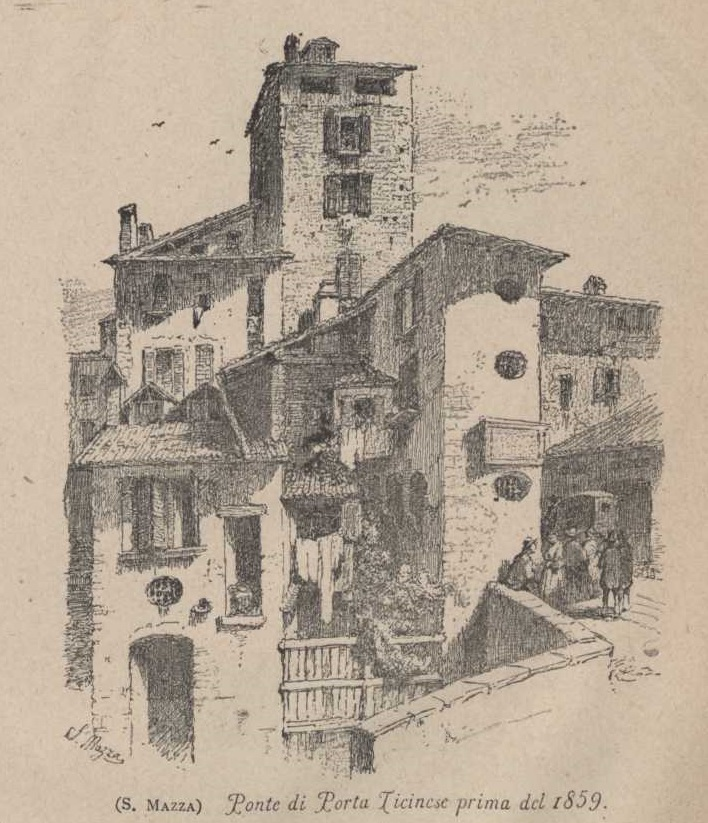
Porta Ticinese before 1859. Illustration by S. Mazza, 1886.

A "Porta Ticinese" was already part of the medieval walls of Milan (12th century); the medieval gate is one of the few remnants of the medieval walls that are still in place, and it is located in the same area as the modern "Porta Ticinese", but closer to the city centre (as the medieval walls enclosed a smaller area than the Spanish walls). The current location of the gate (in a plaza that is now called "Piazzale XIV Maggio") was established during the Spanish rule, in the 16th century. In the early 19th century, most of the Spanish gates were demolished and replaced with new structures that were meant to serve as toll-gates. This was also the case with Porta Ticinese. The new structure was designed by Luigi Cagnola in neoclassic style, and built between 1801 and 1814.

Cagnola's structure consists of massive pillars and ionic order columns surmounted by a large tympanum, and is considered one of the prominent examples of neoclassical architecture of Milan.

In 1815, after the Napoleonic Wars, an inscription was added to the tympanum which reads "PACI POPVLORVM SOSPITAE" (in Latin, "to peace that frees peoples").

== The district ==
Coat of arms of the Porta Ticinese rione

The area surrounding Porta Ticinese is a historic quartiere of Milan; it has its coat of arms, a three-legged red stool on a silver background.

The district is part of the Navigli area of Milan, which is rich of monuments, tourist attractions, night life, and more, and qualifies as one of the most important areas of Milan outside the historic centre. It includes the notable Basilica of Sant'Eustorgio, a basilica that was established in the Middle Ages and restored several times through the centuries, so that the original romanesque structure has been complemented with Renaissance elements. Sant'Eustorgio is located in a well known city park called Parco delle Basiliche, which also includes another prominent basilica, that of San Lorenzo. Nearby are also the Colonne di San Lorenzo, which are among the best preserved Roman ruins in Milan. The plaza where the Colonne di San Lorenzo are located is also one of the key places of the so-called "Milanese movida", i.e., night-life.

== See also ==
- El Biscella
