= Mediolanum =

Ancient Roman city in present day Milan, Italy

Mediolanum superimposed on modern Milan. The lighter rectangle in the centre, slightly to the right, represents the modern Cathedral Square, while the modern Castle Sforzesco is located at the top left, just outside the route of the Roman walls

Wooden model preserved at the Civic Archaeological Museum of Milan showing a reconstruction of the imperial Mediolanum

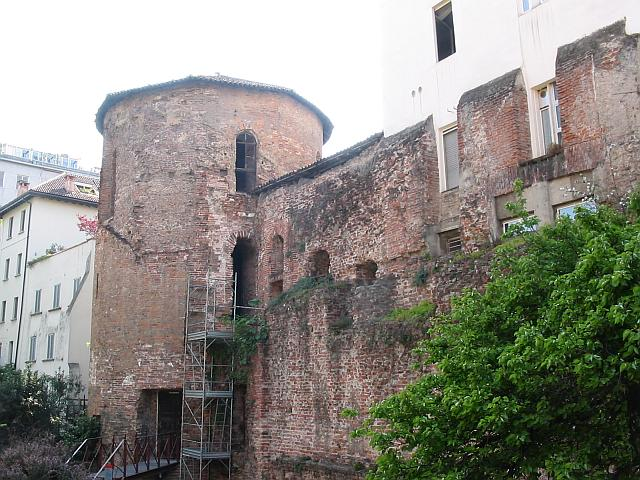
A section of Roman wall (11 m high) with a 24-sided tower

Mediolanum, the ancient city where Milan now stands, was originally an Insubrian city, but afterwards became an important Roman city in Northern Italy.

The city was settled by a Celtic tribe belonging to the Insubres group and belonging to the Golasecca culture under the name Medhelanon around 590 BC, conquered by the Romans in 222 BC, who Latinized the name of the city into Mediolanum, and developed into a key centre of Western Christianity and informal capital of the Western Roman Empire. It declined under the ravages of the Gothic War, its capture by the Lombards in 569, and their decision to make Ticinum the capital of their Kingdom of Italy.

During the Principate the population was 40,000 in AD 200; when the city became capital of the Western Roman Empire under emperor Maximian (r. 286–305), the population rose to 100,000 people and thus Milan became one of the largest cities in Roman Italy.

== History ==
Ruins of the Emperor's palace 45°27′54.43″N 09°10′50.15″E in Milan. Here Constantine and Licinius issued the Edict of Milan.

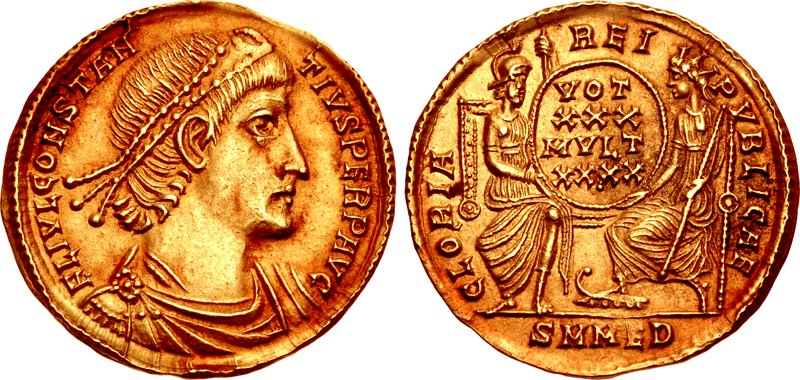
Roman solidus coin (picturing Emperor Constantius II) struck at the Mediolanum mint, circa 354-357 A.D.

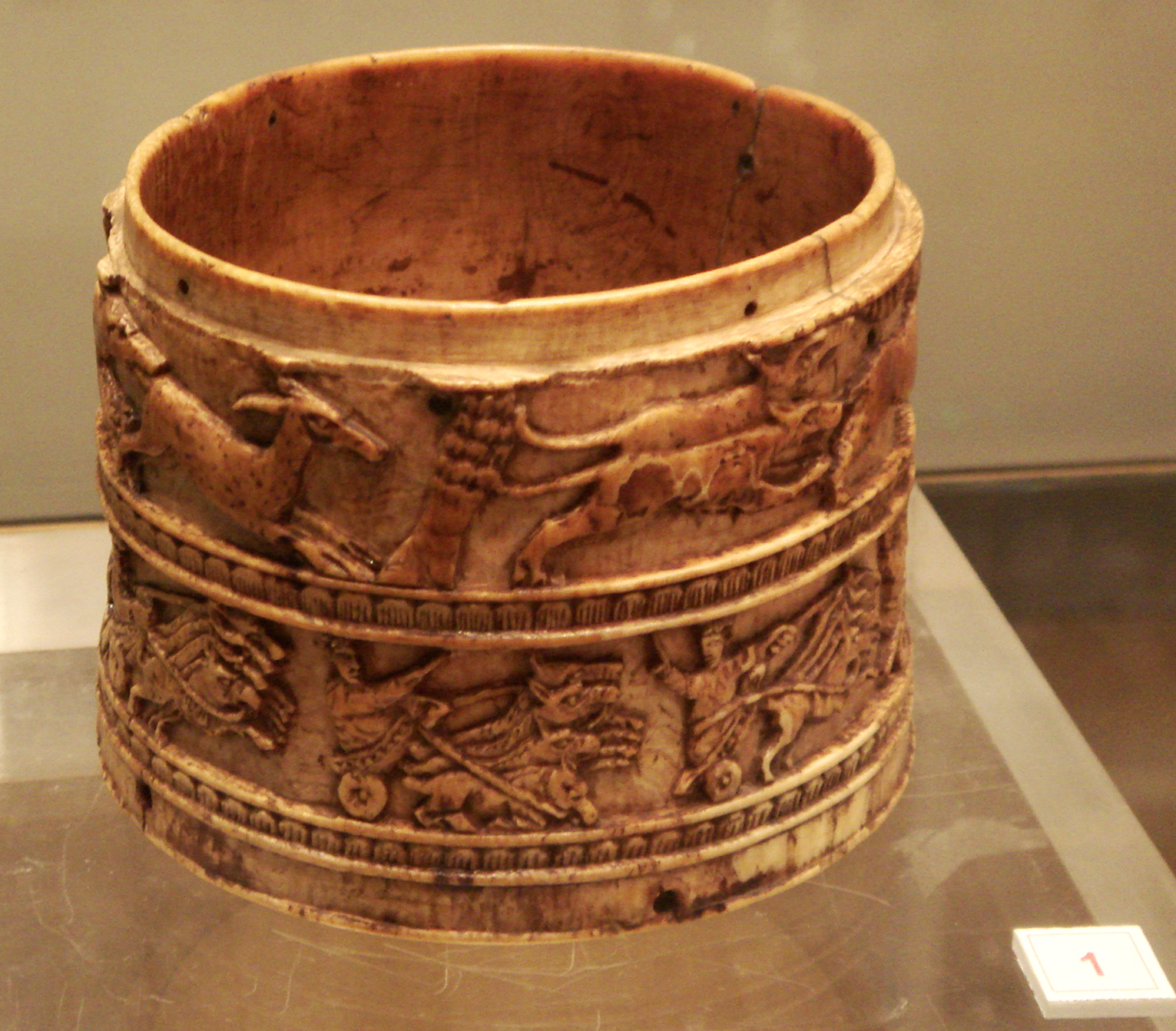
Arena games: ivory cup depicting staged hunts and chariot races, found in Milan, 4th-5th century.

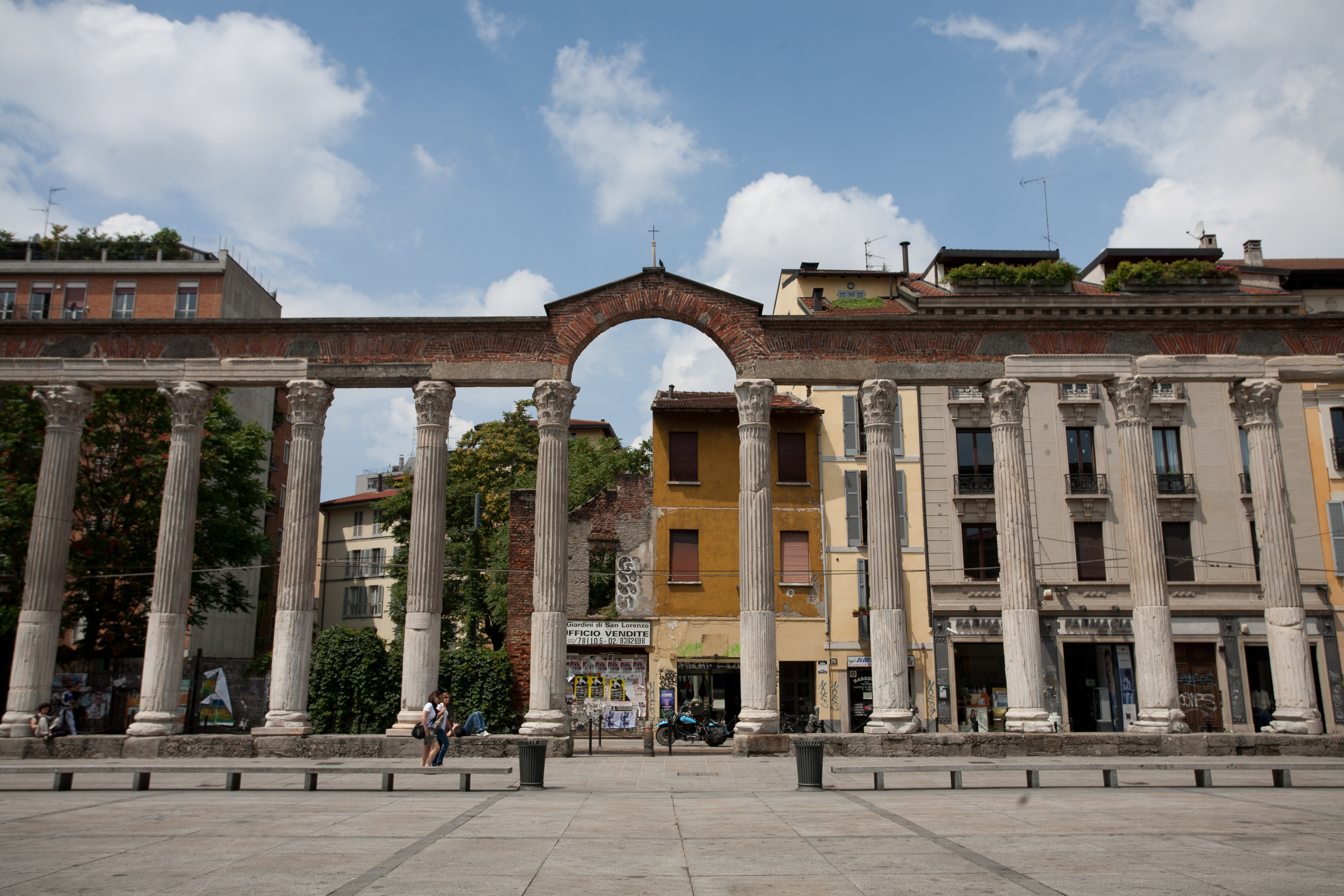
Colonne di San Lorenzo in front of Basilica di San Lorenzo

The city was settled by a Celtic tribe belonging to the Insubres group and belonging to the Golasecca culture around 590 BC under the name Medhelanon According to the legend reported by Livy, the Gaulish king Ambicatus sent his nephew Bellovesus into northern Italy at the head of a party drawn from various Gaulish tribes; this Bellovesus was said to have founded Mediolanum (in the time of Tarquinius Priscus, according to this legend). The Romans, led by consul Gnaeus Cornelius Scipio Calvus, fought the Insubres and captured the city in 222 BC; the chief of the Insubres submitted to Rome, giving the Romans control of the city. They eventually conquered the entirety of the region, calling the new province Cisalpine Gaul – "Gaul this side of the Alps" – and may have given the site its Latinized Celtic name: in Gaulish *medio – meant "middle, center" and the name element -lanon is the Celtic equivalent of Latin -planum "plain", thus *Mediolanon (Latinized as Mediolānum) meant "(settlement) in the midst of the plain."

Mediolanum was important for its location as a hub in the road network of northern Italy. Polybius describes the country as abounding in wine, and every kind of grain, and in fine wool. Herds of swine, both for public and private supply, were bred in its forests, and the people were well known for their generosity.

During the Augustan age Mediolanum was famous for its schools; it possessed a theater and an amphitheatre (129.5 X 109.3 m). A large stone wall encircled the city in Caesar's time, and later was expanded in the late third century AD, by Maximian. Mediolanum was made the seat of the prefect of Liguria (Praefectus Liguriae) by Hadrian, and Constantine made it the seat of the vicar of Italy (Vicarius Italiae). In the third century Mediolanum possessed a mint, a horreum and imperial mausoleum. In 259, Roman legions under the command of Emperor Gallienus soundly defeated the Alemanni in the Battle of Mediolanum.

In 286, Diocletian moved the capital of the Western Roman Empire from Rome to Mediolanum. He chose to reside at Nicomedia in the Eastern Empire, leaving his colleague Maximian at Mediolanum. Maximian built several gigantic monuments, the large circus (470 x 85 metres), the thermae or Baths of Hercules, a large complex of imperial palaces and other services and buildings of which fewer visible traces remain. Maximian increased the city area surrounded by a new, larger stone wall (about 4.5 km long) encompassing an area of 375 acres with many 24-sided towers. The monumental area had twin towers; one that was included in the convent of San Maurizio Maggiore remains 16,60 m high.

It was from Mediolanum that the Emperor Constantine issued what is now known as the Edict of Milan in AD 313, granting tolerance to all religions within the Empire, thus paving the way for Christianity to become the dominant religion of the Empire. Constantine was in Mediolanum to celebrate the wedding of his sister to the Eastern Emperor, Licinius. There were Christian communities in Mediolanum, which contributed its share of martyrs during the persecutions, but the first bishop of Milan who has a firm historical presence is Merocles, who was at the Council of Rome of 313. In the mid-fourth century, the Arian controversy divided the Christians of Mediolanum; Constantius supported Arian bishops and at times there were rival bishops. Auxentius of Milan (died 374) was a respected Arian theologian. During the reign of Valentinian II, bishop Ambrose of Milan prevented the dedication of a basilica to Arian worship.

The city also possessed a number of basilicas, added in the late fourth century AD. These are San Simpliciano, San Nazaro, San Lorenzo and the chapel of San Vittore, located in the basilica of Sant'Ambrogio. In general, the Late Empire encouraged the development of the applied arts in Mediolanum, with ivory and silver work being common in public building projects. In the crypt of the Duomo survive ruins of the ancient church of Saint Tecla and the baptistry where St. Augustine of Hippo was baptized.

In 402, the city was besieged by the Goths led by king Alaric I and the imperial residence was moved to Ravenna. In 452, it was besieged again by Attila, but the real break with its imperial past came in 538, during the Gothic War, when Mediolanum was laid to waste by Uraia, a nephew of Vitiges, King of the Goths, according to Procopius, the losses amounted to 300,000 male citizens and the women sold to the allies of the Goths. The Lombards took Ticinum as their capital (renaming it 'Papia', hence the modern Pavia), and Early Medieval Milan was left to be governed by its archbishops.

== Detailed map of Mediolanum ==
Map of ancient Roman Milan (Mediolanum) (3rd-5th centuries AD) indicating the Roman walls and gates of Milan, the Roman forum of Milan, the Roman theater of Milan, the Roman amphitheater of Milan, the Roman circus of Milan, the area of the Roman imperial palace in Milan (in lighter pink), the Roman mint of Milan, the Herculean baths, the imperial mausoleum of Milan, the via Porticata with the triumphal arch, the Roman food warehouses of Milan (lat. horrea), the Roman river port of Milan, the Roman castles of Milan and the early Christian basilicas of Milan

== Extant structures ==
Some of the monuments of the Roman Mediolanum still to be seen in Milan:

- in the basilica of S. Ambrogio:
  - the Chapel of S. Vittore, with Late Antique mosaics
  - the so‑called "Tomb of Stilicho", assembled from a Roman sarcophagus and other material.
  - a large collection of inscriptions.
- the Colonne di San Lorenzo, a colonnade in front of the church of S. Lorenzo.
- Roman lapidary material in the Archi di Porta Nuova.
- the scant remains of a large amphitheatre, now in an archaeological park dedicated to their preservation.
- a tower (16.6 m high) of the circus, now inside the Convento di San Maurizio Maggiore.
- a bit of moenia (walls) and a tower with 24 sides (Maximian, 3rd century)
- the church of San Lorenzo (IV-V sec.) and the San Aquilino chapel.
- ruins of the imperial palace.
- some ruins from the Baths of Hercules; further remains of ceilings and floors are in the archaeological museum.
- the body of St. Ambrose (d. 397) and those possibly of SS. Gervasius and Protasius — or at any rate, of earlier men, found in St. Ambrose's time, are still seen in the crypt of the church of S. Ambrogio.
- crypt of San Giovanni in Conca
- a bit of the moenia and some remnants of pavements in piazza Missori and in the namesake station of Milan Metro.

== Legacy ==
The ancient city name is commemorated in the Mediolanum Forum at Assago and the Mediolanum Corporate University, Milan.

== See also ==
- Milan#History, for the medieval and modern history of Milan
- Walls of Milan
- Diocletian
- List of Roman sites
