= Bottonuto =

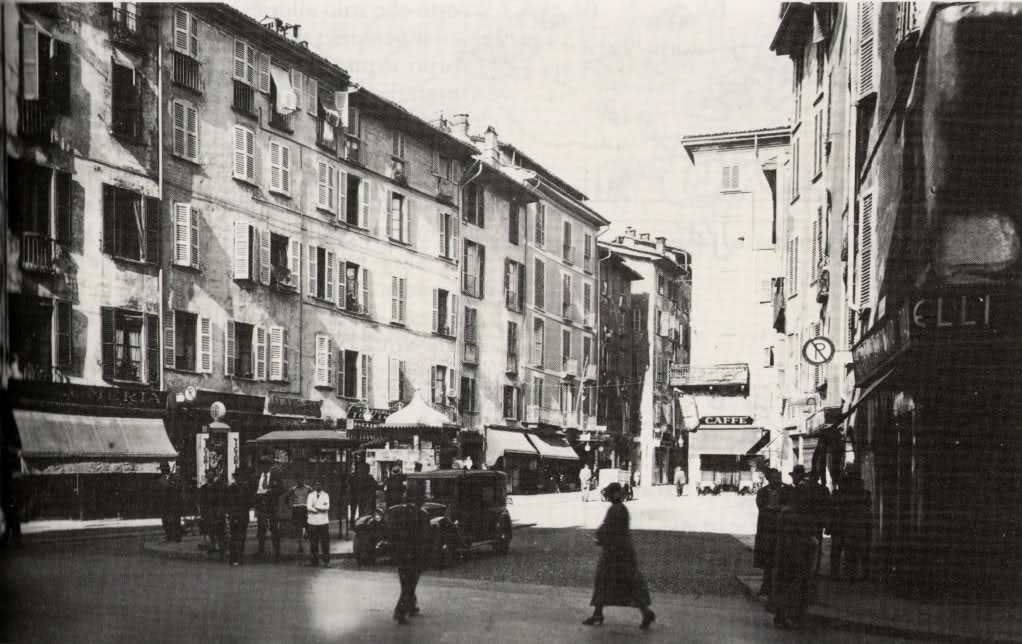
View of the Bottonuto between 1920 and 1930

The Bottonuto was an ancient district of Milan, Italy, located near the center of the city. Dating back to Roman times, in the late 19th the district had become a place of ill repute, brothels and open-air outhouses. It was demolished between the 1930s and 1960s and replaced with the current business district of Via Larga and Piazza Diaz.

== History ==
The district developed around a postern in the Roman Walls of Milan. While the origin of the name is uncertain, scholars suggest that it may be from the word "bottino", which, in hydraulics, refers to a drainage pit; in fact, a complex of sewerage and drainage structures were built in the area in the 1st century. Over the centuries, the district evolved from a mostly military area (in late Roman times) to a popular neighborhood, which in the 18th century featured a wine market. The area experienced decay and decline towards the 19th century, and as of the early 20th century it was described as dirty, devious place of prostitution and crime. This contrasted with the wealthy surroundings, and caused the growing indignation of the population of such surroundings.

The district was partly demolished in the 1930s, purportedly for sanitary and decency reason; in practice, the demolition was also probably motivated by real estate business purposes, as the whole area consequently experienced a dramatic increase in value. Bombings in World War II also affected what remained of the original Bottonuto. After the war, nevertheless, the neighborhood experienced a brief renaissance, with a flourishing of jazz and rock'n'roll venues. This ended in the 1960s, when new requalification activities led to the dismantling of the last remnants of the Bottonuto, replaced by business and commercial buildings.
