= Parco delle Basiliche =

Urban park in Milan, Italy

Parco Papa Giovanni Paolo II (formerly Parco delle Basiliche)
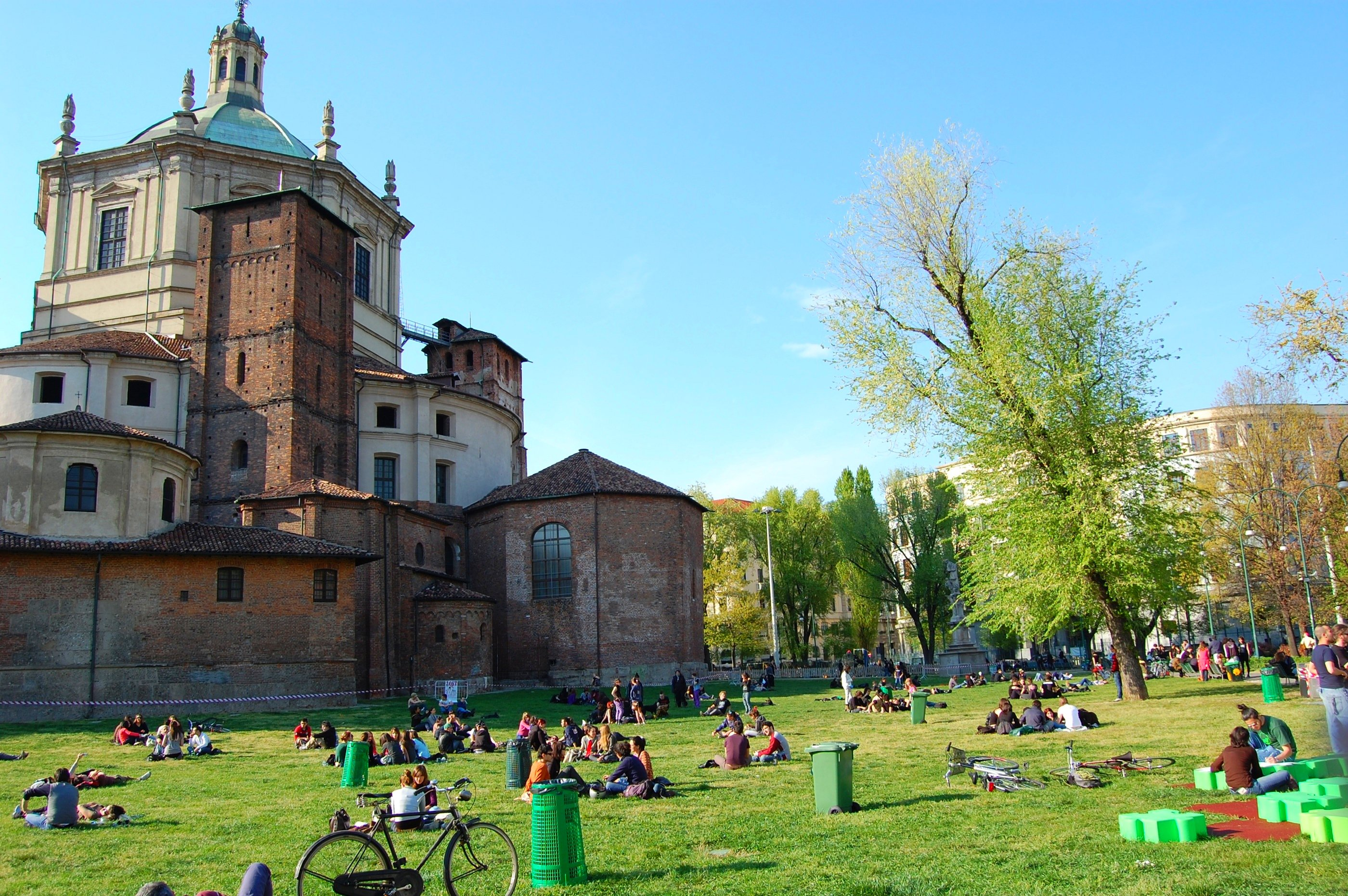

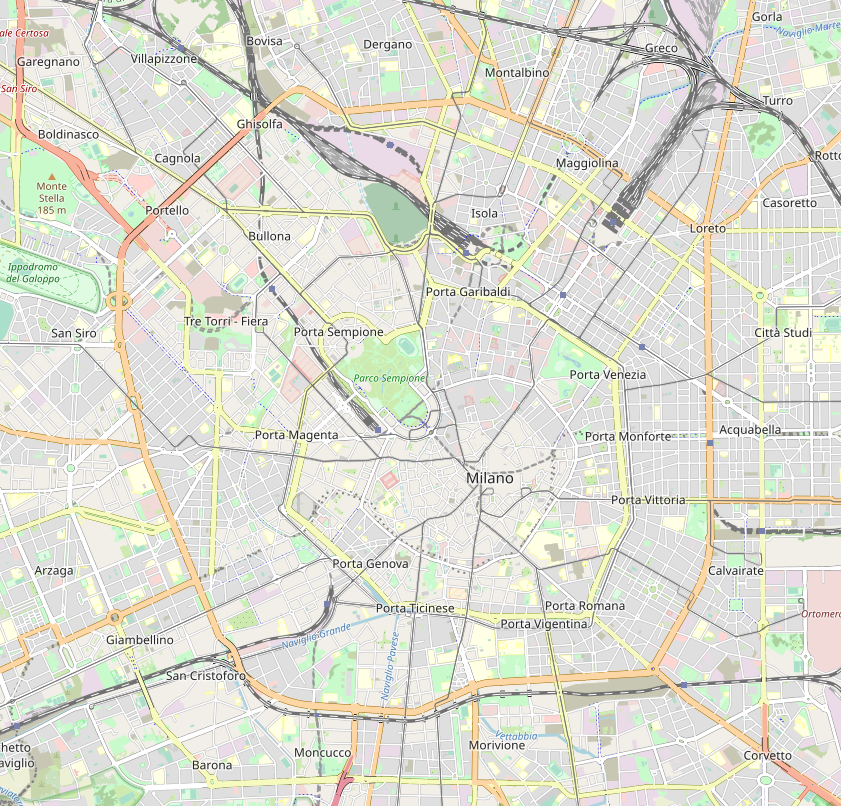
- Location within Milan Location within Italy
- Type: Urban park
- Location: Zone 1 of Milan, Italy
- Coordinates: 45.45°N 9.18°E
- Area: 40,700 square metres (438,000 sq ft)
- Created: 1956
- Operator: Comune di Milano
- Status: Open all year (usually from 6 am to 11 pm, depending on season)

Parco Papa Giovanni Paolo II ("Pope John Paul II Park"), best known by its historic name Basilicas Park (Parco delle Basiliche in Italian) is a city park of Milan, Italy, located in Zone 1. It owes its name to the fact that it connects two major basilicas, the Basilica of San Lorenzo and the Basilica of Sant'Eustorgio. The park has an overall area of 40.700 m^{2}, bisected by Via Molino delle Armi, one of the avenues comprising the Cerchia dei Navigli ring road (this was originally intended to be adapted into an underpass, but the plan was never implemented).

== History ==
In 1925, the authorities of Milan started a revitalization project for the area surrounding the Basilica of San Lorenzo and the nearby Colonne di San Lorenzo (a double colonnade that is one of the major Roman ruins in Milan). At the time, the area had marshes of polluted water produced by the tanneries located in the adjacent Piazza della Vetra, as well as old buildings in a state of decay. The area was cleared in 1934, but it was only after World War II that it was actually redesigned as a green public space. Architects Pier Fausto Bagatti Valsecchi and Antonio Grandi, enrolled in 1956, conceived the new park as a sort of archaeological promenade connecting the two basilicas, the Colonne di San Lorenzo, and the ruins of a Roman amphitheatre.

The area surrounding the park and the Colonne di San Lorenzo is one of the most popular night-life districts of Milan, with a number of bars, pubs, disco clubs, and other venues of the so-called "Milanese movida". In the last decades of the 20th century, security issues were repeatedly reported, including vandalisms, drug trafficking, excessive noise and abusive parking. These problems were addressed in the park renovation that took place in 2000, on the occasion of the Great Jubilee; specifically, the whole area of the park was fenced and security cameras were installed. On the same occasion, the green area was also partially redesigned, and the name of the park was formally changed to "Parco Papa Paolo Giovanni II".

== Features ==
Besides its architectural and archaeological sites of interests (i.e., the two basilicas and the Roman ruins), the park is renowned for its ornamental trees; tree species that can be found in the park include several species of maples (Acer) such as ash-leaved maple (A. negundo), Norway maple (A. platanoides), and silver maple (A. saccharinum), European hornbeam (Carpinus betulus), cherry plum (Prunus cerasifera), European beech (Fagus sylvatica), French oak (Quercus robur), several species of elm (Ulmus), black poplar (Populus nigra), European black pine (Pinus nigra), London plane (Platanus × hispanica), and pagoda tree (Sophora japonica).

== See also ==
- Piazza della Vetra
- Porta Ticinese
