= Wall of Dolls, Milan =

Coordinates: 45.45759°N 9.18061°E

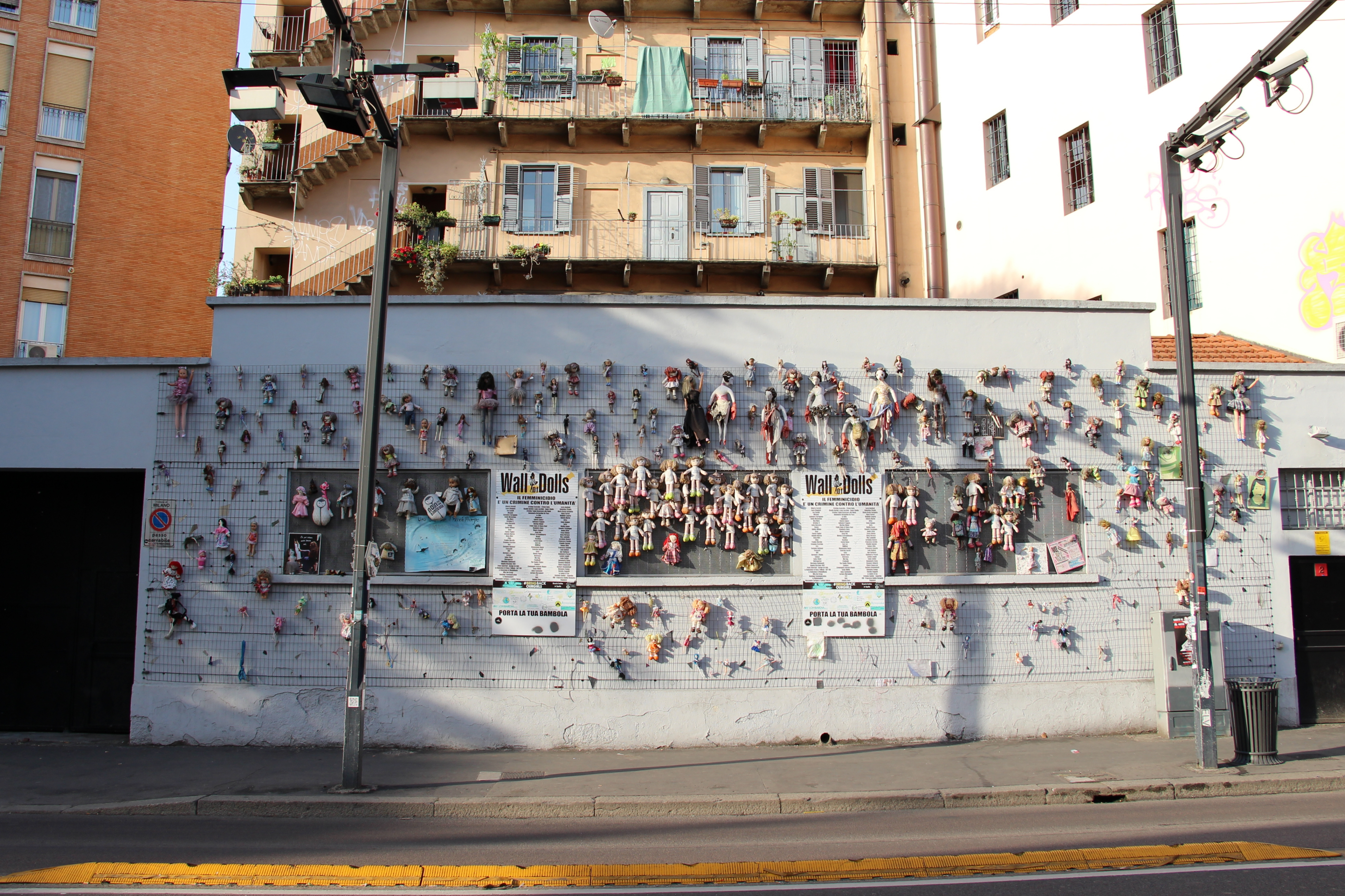
Wall of Dolls (2015)

The Wall of Dolls (Italian: Muro delle bambole) is an informal and changing art installation and memorial located, dedicated to remembering female victims of violence and murder, located on 2 Via Edmondo de Amicis just west of the Medieval Porta Ticinese in central Milan, region of Lombardy, Italy.

The monument, installed in 2014, consists of many, diverse dolls, many with the names of victims, hung on a metal wire grid support on a wall facing the busy Via Amicis. The idea was first proposed in 2013 by the singer and songwriter Jo Squillo, and supported by Giusy Versace and Francesca Carollo. The project attracted support from diverse organizations, artists, and students involved in tailor work for the School of San Giusto.

The public is able to add their own dolls to the installation. In July a fire of unknown origin damaged the center of the exhibit. Similar projects have been proposed elsewhere, including Verona and Venice, the latter inaugurated by Donatella Versace in the Spring of 2019.
