= Baths of Hercules =

Imperial Roman era baths in Milan

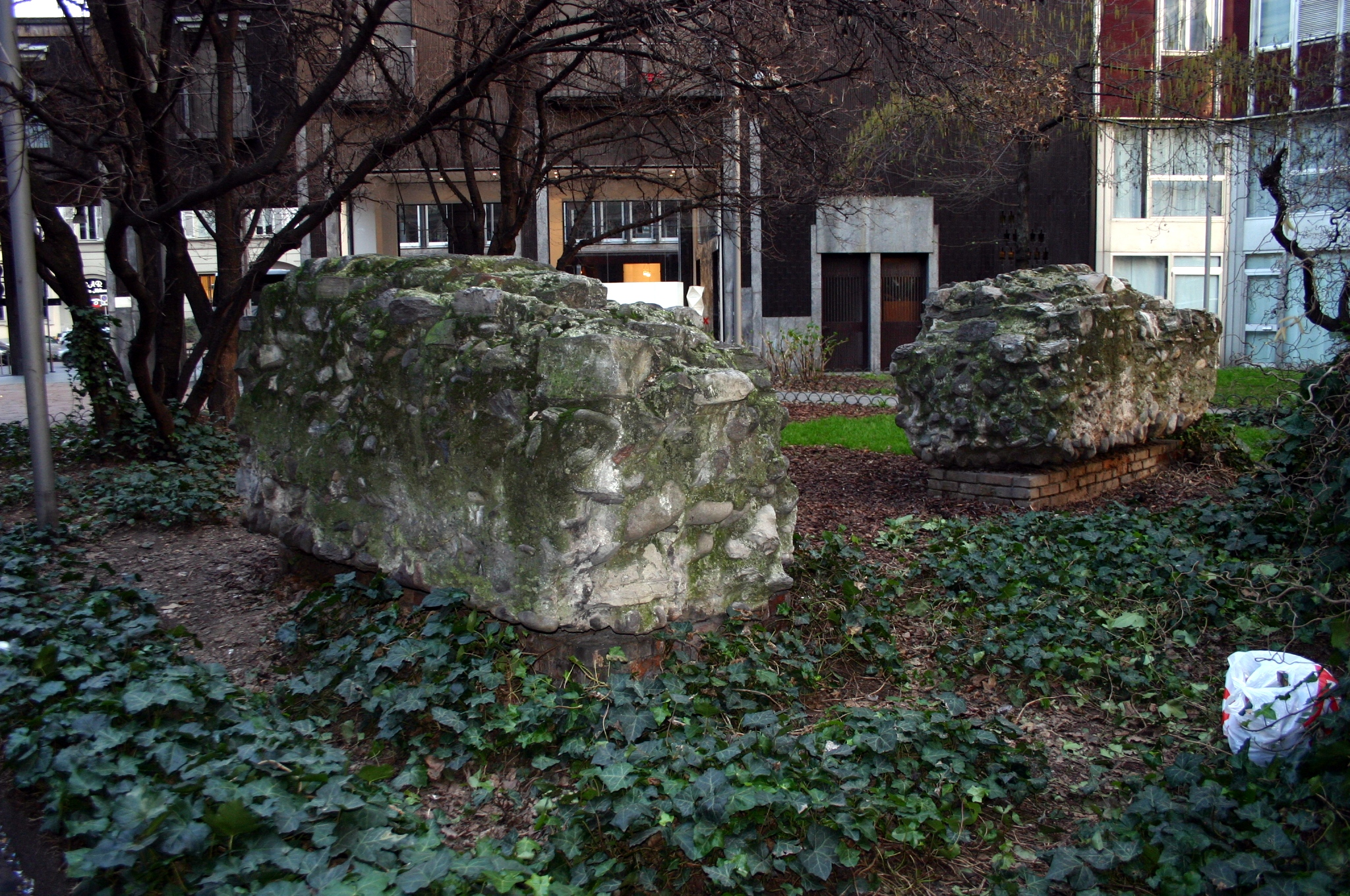
- Remains of the complex in the gardens of Largo Corsia dei Servi

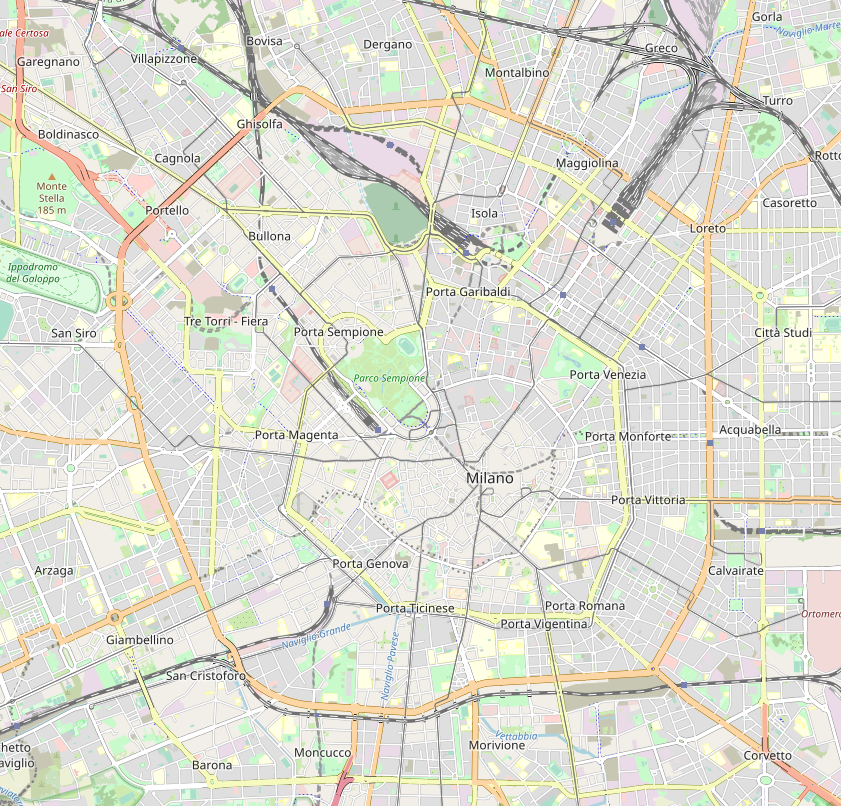
- Location of the ruins today
- 45°27′53.6″N 9°11′45.21″E
- Type: Roman bathouse
- Cultures: Roman Empire
- Location: Mediolanum

Site notes
- Area: 14,000 m^{2} (150,000 sq ft)

The Baths of Hercules (Latin: Thermae Herculianae, Italian: Terme Herculee) were the largest thermae in the ancient Roman city of Mediolanum (modern-day Milan). The structure was built during the late 3rd and early 4th century, under the orders of Emperor Maximian, who had assumed the title Herculius after the divine hero.

== History ==
The bathhouse stood in the newly-built northeastern quarter of the city until eventually being reduced to ruins. Evidence suggests it was heavily damaged by fire during the barbarian invasions of the 5th century. Whatever remained of the building was almost certainly leveled during Holy Roman Emperor Frederick Barbarossa's siege of Milan in 1162.
