= Porta Magenta =

Coordinates: 45°27′58″N 9°09′57″E

- Quartiere of Milan
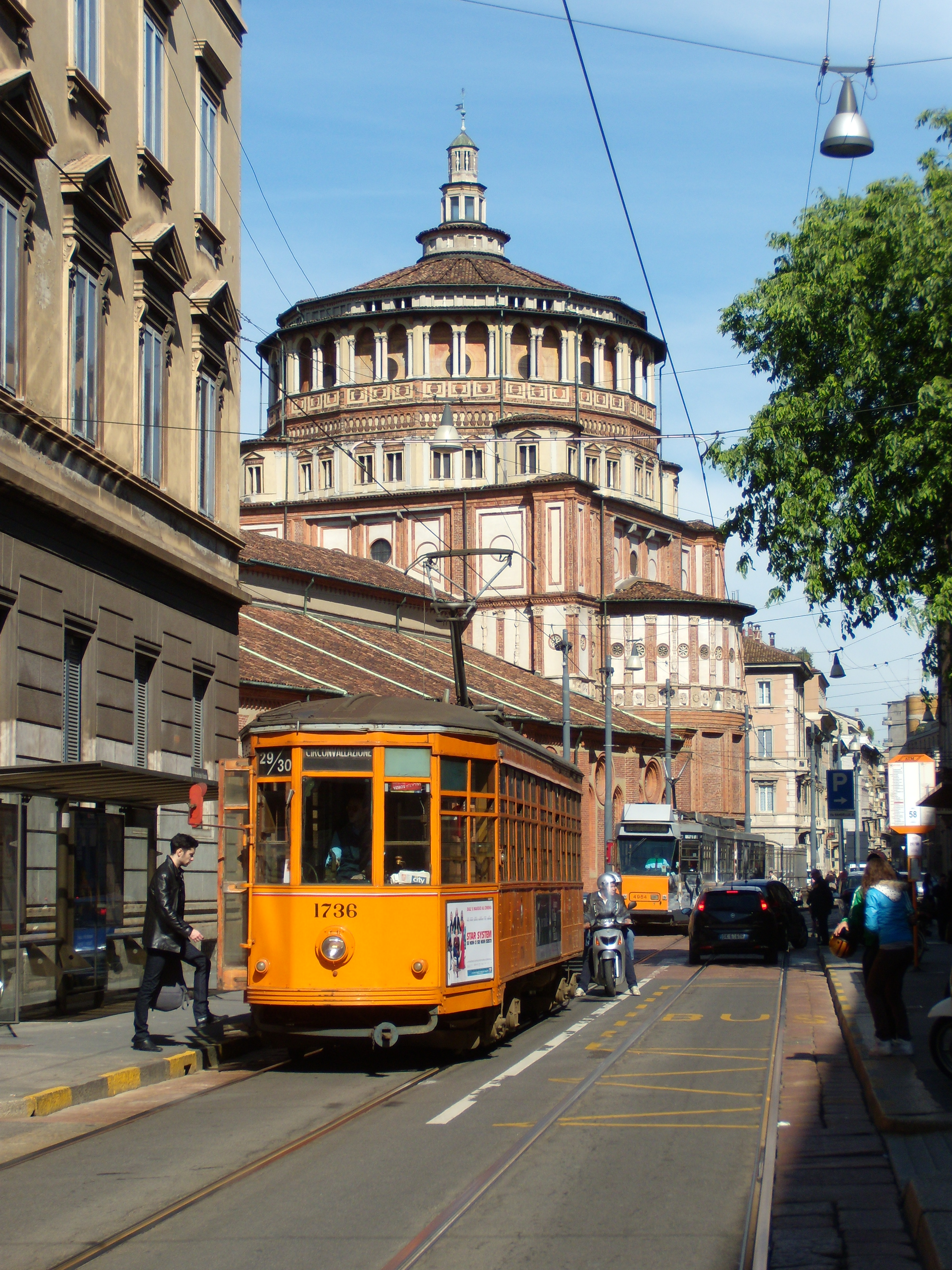
- Corso Magenta, with the church of Santa Maria delle Grazie in the background
- Interactive map of Porta Magenta
- Country: Italy
- Region: Lombardy
- Province: Milan
- Comune: Milan
- Zone: 7
- Time zone: UTC+1 (CET)
  - Summer (DST): UTC+2 (CEST)

Porta Magenta, formerly known as Porta Vercellina, was one of the city gates of Milan, Italy. The gate was established in the 9th century, with the Roman walls of the city; it was moved with the medieval and Spanish walls, and was finally demolished in the 19th century. The phrase "Porta Magenta" is now used to refer to the district ("quartiere") where the gate used to be; the district is part of the Zone 7 administrative division of Milan, west of the city centre.

Both names "Porta Magenta" and "Porta Vercellina" refer to cities located west of Milan (respectively Magenta and Vercelli). The former name was after Vercelli as the gate controlled the road connecting Milan to this city; the latter name was chosen to celebrate the Battle of Magenta, a decisive victory in the Second Italian War of Independence.

== The gate ==
Coat of arms of the Porta Vercellina rione

A Porta Vercellina was part of the Roman walls of Milan; it was located in what is now Via San Giovanni sul Muro, at the corner of Via Meravigli. The gate was probably restructured (but not relocated) in the Roman Empire era. There are no remnants of the Roman gate, although the area houses some of the best preserved Roman relics of Milan, namely part of the Imperial Palace (in Via Brisa), the "Anspertus Tower" (later adapted as a clocktower of the Maggiore monastery), and part of the foundations of the walls themselves.

In the 12th century, after Frederick I Barbarossa conquered and ravaged Milan, a new fortified walls system was built, enclosing a larger area, and Porta Vercellina was thus moved west, farther from the centre, to what is now Via Carducci, between the Basilica of Sant'Ambrogio and the Sforza Castle. A moat and a drawbridge were added to the gate. In the Middle Ages, the name "Porta Vercellina" began to identify the rione as well as the gate; the rione had its own coat of arms. The only remnant of the medieval walls is a statue of Mary and Baby, now housed by the nearby Church of São Nicolau (Nicholas of Flüe).

In the 16th century, during Spanish rule, the walls of Milan were again enlarged, and the gate moved again west, to what is now the corner between Via Toti and Corso Vercelli.

This gate was demolished and rebuilt in the early 19th century, when Milan became the capital of the Napoleonic Italian Kingdom. Porta Vercellina was actually among the first gates to be restructured, as it was destined to be used for the triumphal entry of Napoleon in Milan on 8 May 1805. The design of the new gate was commissioned to architect Luigi Canonica, and "hastily built".

As with the other Napoleonic gates of Milan, Porta Vercellina had lost its defensive function, and became a tollgate.

The gate was renamed "Porta Magenta" in 1860, to celebrate the victorious Battle of Magenta. In 1873, when the boundaries of Milan were enlarged and the surrounding Comune dei Corpi Santi was annexed to the city, the tollgate at Porta Vercellina lost its purpose, and in 1885 the gate was finally demolished. It was replaced by a railway office by 1906.

== The district ==
The district of Porta Magenta is a central district of Milan. Its main streets, Corso Magenta and Corso Vercelli, are a prominent shopping area, with several shops and large stores. Being part of the centre of Milan, the district is rich of 19th century monumental buildings and other prominent architectures, especially in Corso Magenta. The most important building in the district is the church of Santa Maria delle Grazie, one of Milan's prominent landmarks as well as UNESCO World Heritage Site, which is known both for its architecture and for housing Leonardo da Vinci's The Last Supper mural. Other landmark buildings in Porta Magenta include Palazzo Litta, the church of San Mauririzio, and the Palazzo delle Stelline. The district also includes the most well-known and historic jailhouse of Milan, the Carcere di San Vittore (in Via San Vittore).
