= Walls of Milan =

Defensive walls of the city of Milan

The city of Milan, Italy, has had three different systems of defending walls. The oldest, the Roman walls, were developed in two stages: the first in the Republican era and the second in the Imperial era. The second wall system was realized in the Middle Ages (12th century), after the destruction of the city by Frederick I Barbarossa. Finally, the latest wall system was built by the Spanish rulers in the 16th century. While very little remains of these walls, their structure is clearly reflected in the urbanistic layout of the city. In particular, modern Milan has two roughly circular rings of streets, namely the "Cerchia dei Navigli" and the "Cerchia dei Bastioni", which essentially correspond to the Medieval and Spanish walls, respectively. Note that a third ring of roads just beyond the Inner Ring Road (circonvallazione interna / "Cerchia dei Bastioni"), called the External Ring Road (circonvallazione esterna), does not follow any old city walls, but rather was part of the 1884 Beruto Plan for the city of Milan, created and named after a municipal engineer and public servant to the local city government.

== Roman walls ==
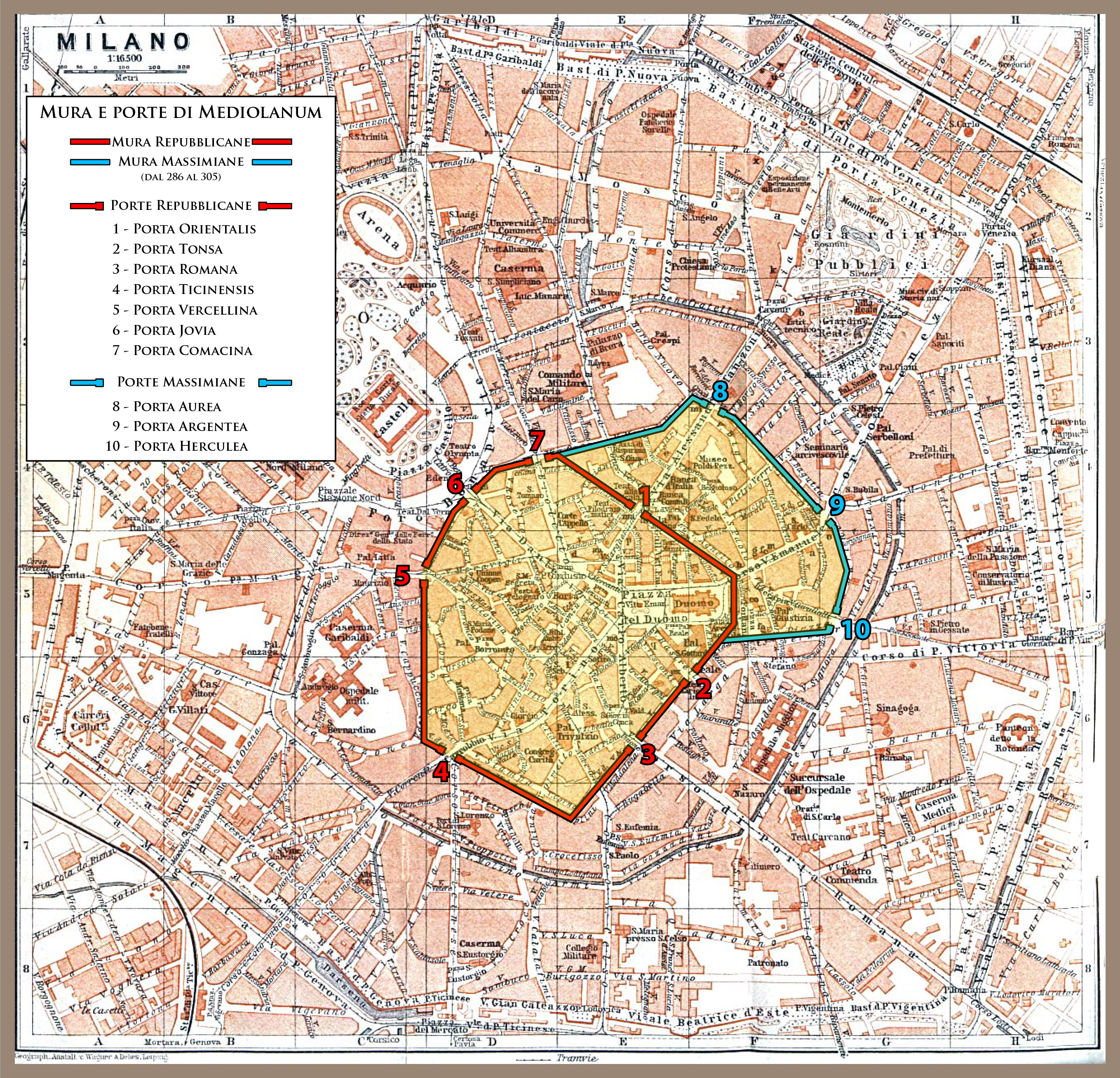
Map of the Roman walls of Milan. The Republican walls are shown in red, the Imperial (Maximian) walls in blue

=== Republican walls ===
The oldest wall system was built when Milan (then Mediolanum) became a Roman municipium, in 49 BC. It was essentially square, each side about 700 m long. The walls had 6 main gates, which are usually referred to as "Porta Romana" (in Piazza Missori), "Porta Ticinese" (at Carrobbio), "Porta Vercellina" (where Santa Maria alla Porta church stands, "Porta Orientale" (or Porta Argentea, in via San Paolo), "Porta Jovia" (in via San Giovanni sul Muro), and "Porta Cumana" (at the end of Via Broletto, between Via Cusani and Via del Lauro). Note that some of these names (for example, "Porta Romana" and "Porta Ticinese" are also used to refer to gates of later wall systems located in the same area.

=== Maximian walls ===
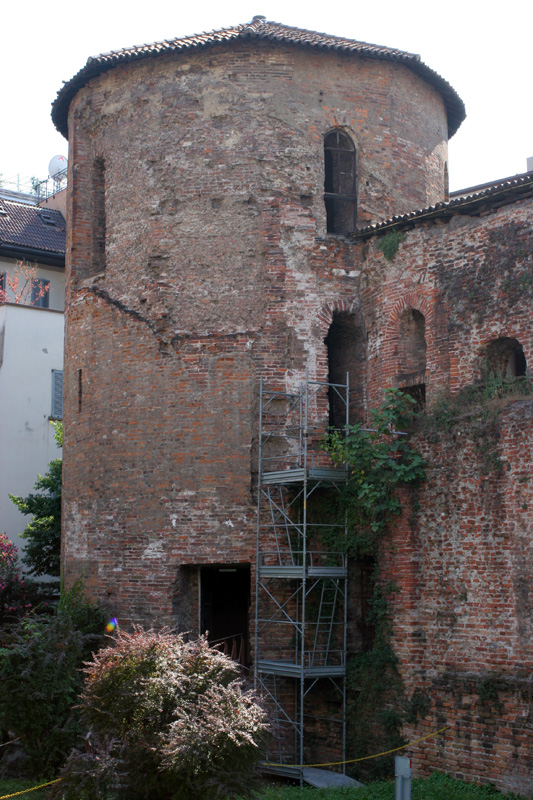
The Maximian tower in the courtyard of the Archaeological Museum of Milan

In the Imperial era, while Mediolanum was capital of the Western Roman Empire, Emperor Maximian enlarged the city walls; to the east, this was intended to include the Hercules' thermae (located in the surroundings of what are now Piazza San Babila, Corso Europa and Piazza Fontana); to the west, the new walls enclosed the arena. Overall, the new wall systems exceeded 100 hectares. Two gates were added, later referred to as "Porta Nuova" (in what is now the corner between via Manzoni and via Montenapoleone) and "Porta Tonsa" (in the area now known as "Verziere").

=== Remnants ===
A few sections of Milan's Roman walls are still in place, among which:

- in the northern part of Carrobbio, partially englobed in the modern buildings, a part of the 1st Century tower of Porta Ticinese;
- in the basement of some buildings of San Vito, a trait of the Republican walls;
- in the garden of a building in Via Medici, a Maximian tower and a short trait of walls;
- in the courtyard of the Archaeological Museum of Corso Magenta, a 24-side polygonal Maximian tower;
- in the basement of some building of Via Montenapoleone, some traits of Maximian walls
- in the cloister of the Monastery of San Vittore, now Leonardo da Vinci Museum of Science and Technology, the remnants of an octagonal building and two towers.

== Medieval walls ==
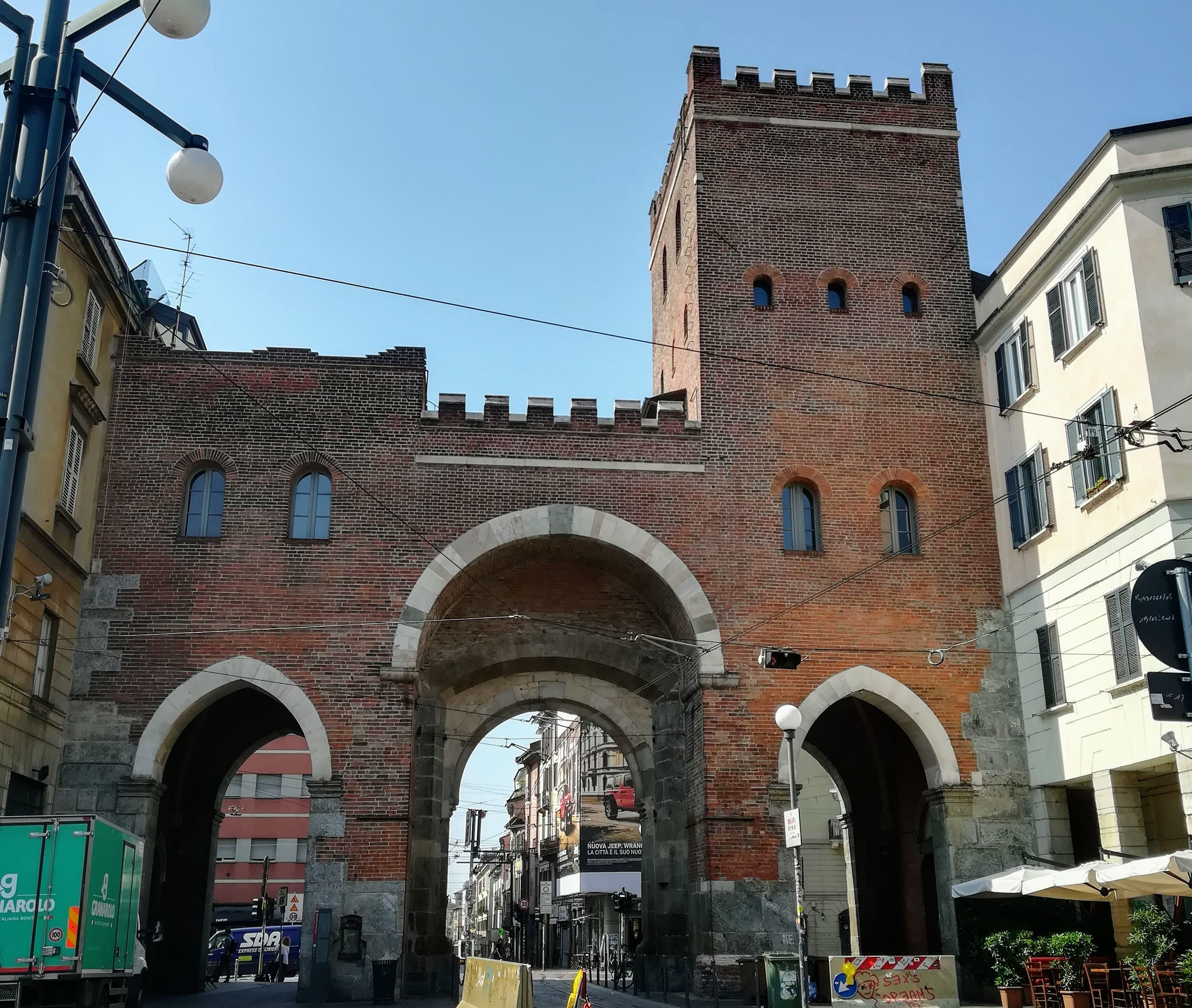
"Porta Ticinese", one of the remaining gates from the medieval walls of Milan

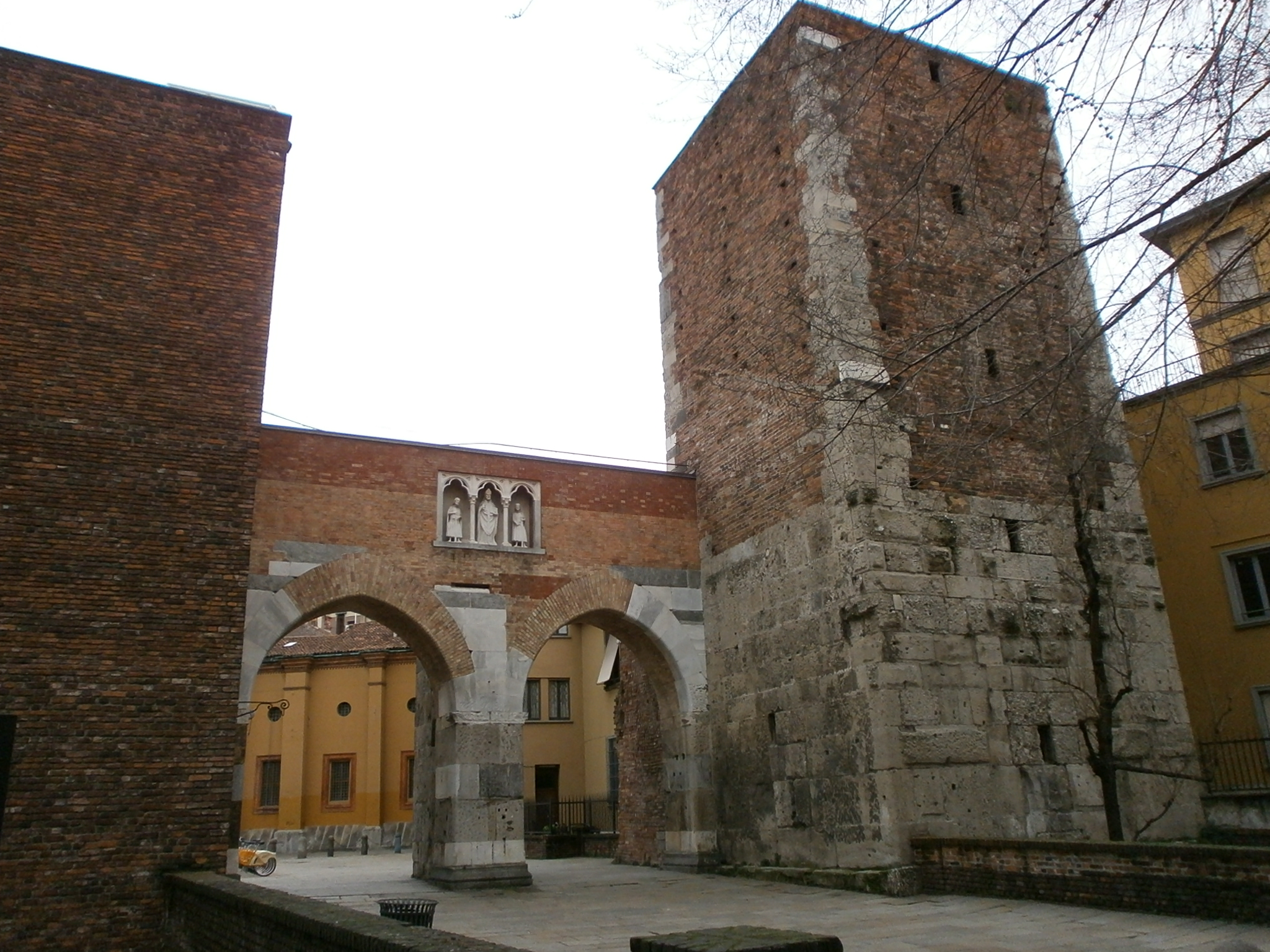
"Pusterla di Sant'Ambrogio", one of the remaining medieval posterns

The medieval walls of Milan were built in the 12th Century, mostly as a defense against Frederick I Barbarossa, who repeatedly raided Lombardy. The perimeter of the medieval walls essentially correspond to what is now known as the Cerchia dei Navigli [Navigli Ring], a ring of streets that enclose the historic centre of the city.

The construction of the medieval defensive structure of Milan started in 1156. In the beginning, a deep moat was realized, filled up with water drawn from the Seveso and Nirone rivers. Wooden walls were added as a supplementary defensive measure, and the remnants of the Roman walls were probably exploited as well. Despite this first defensive installment, Frederick I Barbarossa razed Milan to the ground in 1162. After that, reconstruction immediately started, this time with stone walls. The final wall system was almost circular (in poet Bonvesin de la Riva's words: "of admirable roundness"), with seven main gates (Porta Ticinese, Porta Vercellina, Porta Giovia, Porta Comasina, Porta Romana, Porta Nuova and Porta Orientale) and about ten "pusterle" or posterns (including Pusterla dei Fabbri, Pusterla di Sant'Ambrogio, Pusterla delle Azze, Pusterla di San Marco, Pusterla Monforte, Pusterla Tosa, Pusterla di Sant'Eufemia, Pusterla della Chiusa).

Most of the medieval walls were demolished between the 16th and 19th Century. The moats remained and were used as canals.

=== Remnants ===
Traits of Milan's medieval walls that still exist today include:

- at the end of Via Manzoni, the old 12th Century Porta Nuova;
- Porta Ticinese, also one of the main gates of the medieval walls;
- remnants of the medieval Porta Romana, in the basement of two buildings at the crossroad between Corso di Porta Romana and Via Sforza;
- about 20 meters of medieval walls have been preserved in Via San Damiano;
- in the building at Corso di Porta Venezia, 21, there is a fragment of a bas-relief that used to be part of Porta Orientale.

The pusterla di Sant'Ambrogio, located by the eponymous church, is a 1939 reconstruction of the original Pusterla di Sant'Ambrogio.

== Spanish walls ==
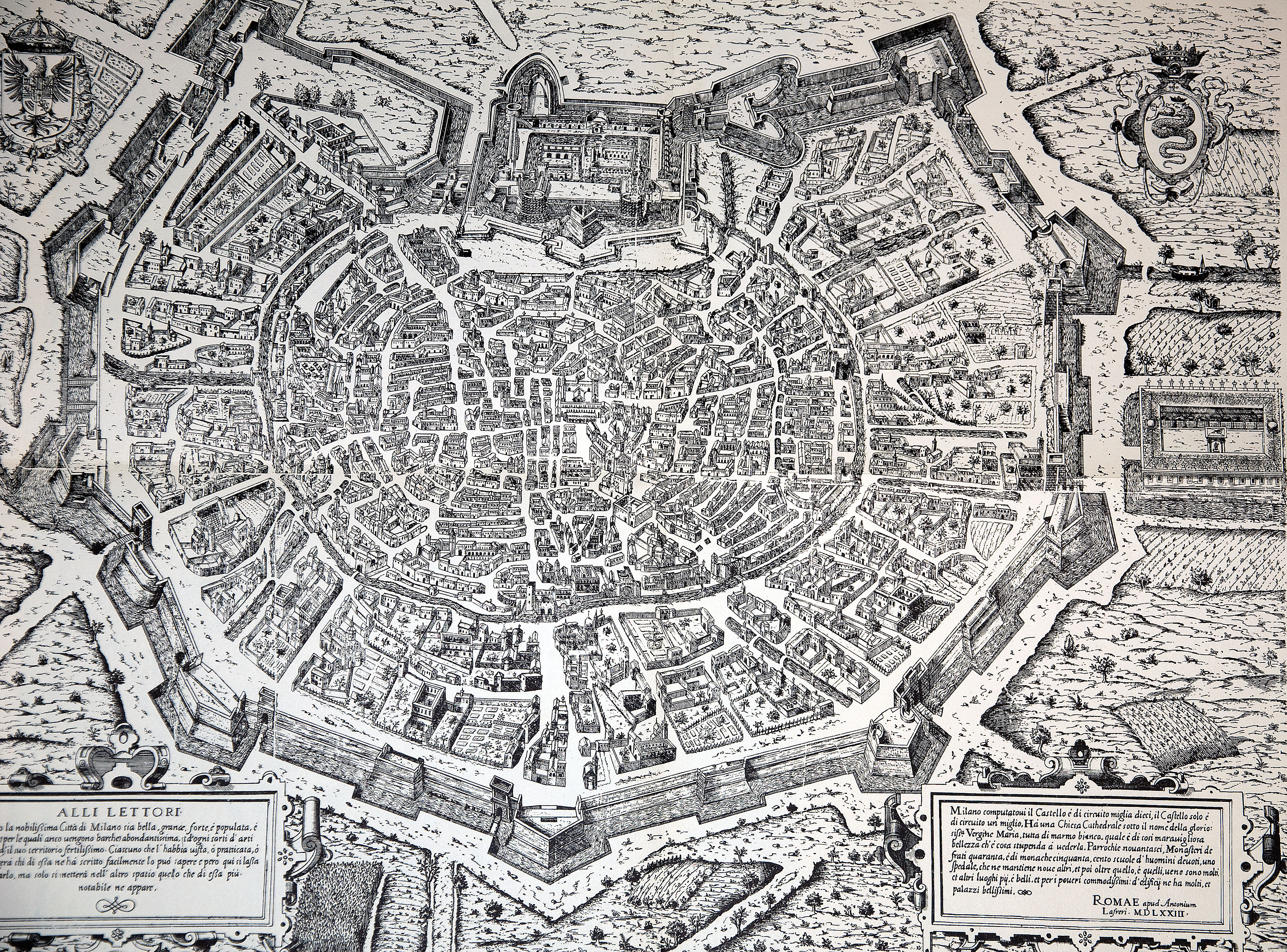
Milan in 1573

The so-called "Mura Spagnole" (Spanish Walls) of Milan were built between 1546 and 1560 in obedience to the will of Ferrante Gonzaga, city governor during the Spanish rule of Milan. The new wall system had an overall perimeter of about 11 km, much larger than that of the medieval walls; several traits of the walls were reinforced by moats obtained by the numerous canals surrounding the city. The perimeter of the Spanish walls essentially corresponds to what is now known as the "Cerchia dei Bastioni" ("Bastion Ring").

The walls remained well into the 19th Century, but they lost their military purpose in the mid 18th Century, being adapted as a sort of panoramic promenade by governor Gian Luca Pallavicini. Stendhal has described this promenade in his diary Rome, Naples et Florence; at the time, a passer-by would be able to see the Duomo from anywhere on the walls. From the northern part of the walls, one would be able to see both the Duomo (if looking south) and the Alps (if looking north).

The Spanish walls comprised 11 gates: Porta Romana, Porta Tosa (now Porta Vittoria), Porta Orientale (renamed Porta Venezia in 1860), Porta Nuova, Porta Comasina (renamed Porta Garibaldi in 1860), Porta Tenaglia, Porta Sempione, Porta Vercellina, Porta Ticinese, Porta Lodovica, and Porta Vigentina.

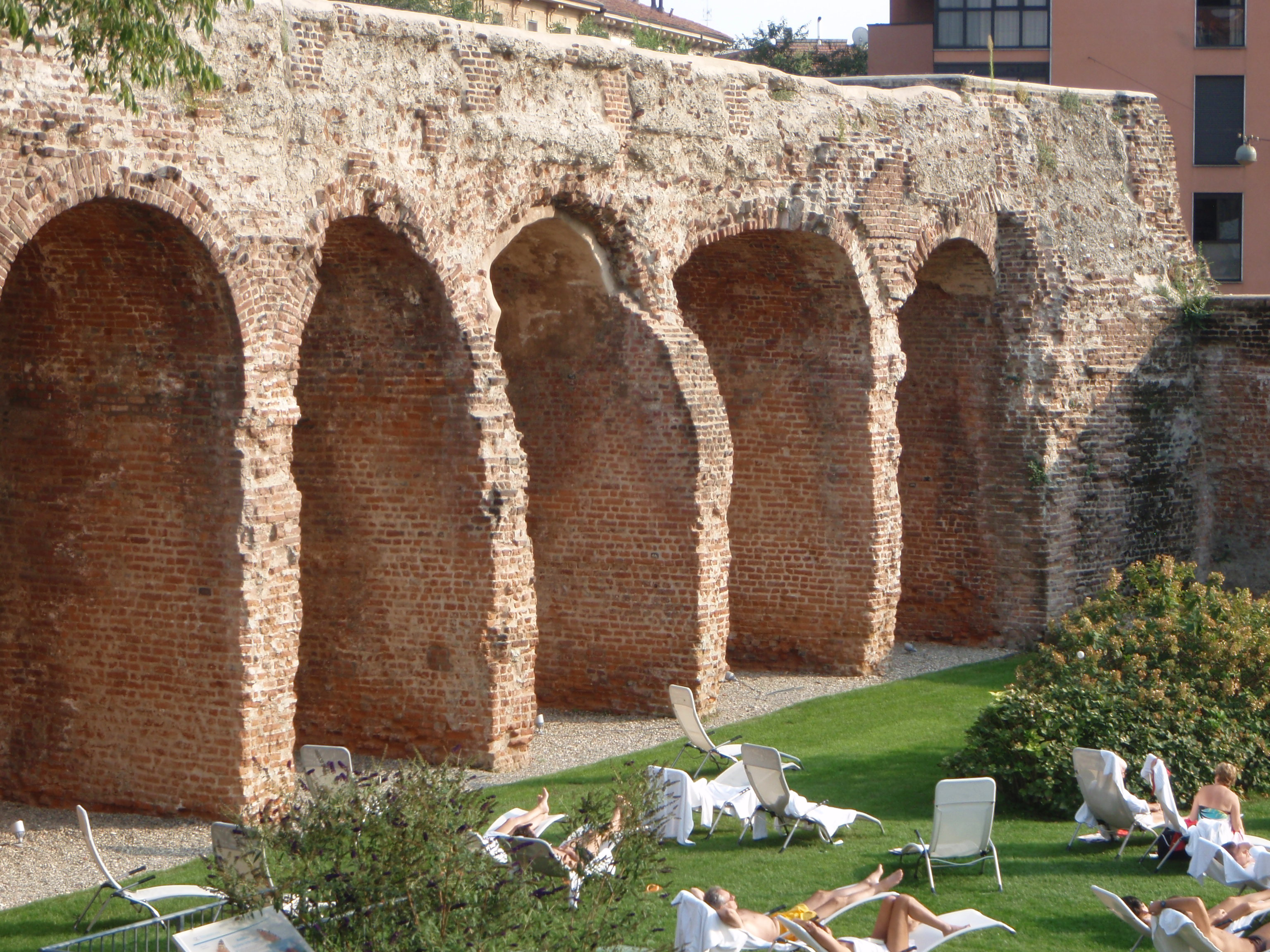
Spanish walls in Porta Romana

When Milan was annexed to the Napoleonic Empire, governor Francesco Melzi d'Eril ordered the demolition of the Spanish walls and the replacement of the original gates. At the time, the gates were to serve as customs duty stations, and their architecture was supposed to reflect the grandeur of the Napoleonic Empire as well as the role of Milan as the capital of the Kingdom of Italy. As a consequence, many of Milan's modern "gates" are located where the Spanish gates used to be, but only date back to the 19th Century.

=== Remnants ===
The best preserved parts of the Spanish walls are found in the surroundings of Porta Romana, for example in Piazza Medaglie d'Oro, between Piazza Medaglie d'Oro and Piazza XXIV Maggio, and in Viale Vittorio Veneto. In Viale Monte Nero there are two small gardens obtained from the old walls.
