= Pusterla di Sant'Ambrogio =

Coordinates: 45°27′43″N 9°10′26″E

Pusterla di Sant'Ambrogio (Milan)
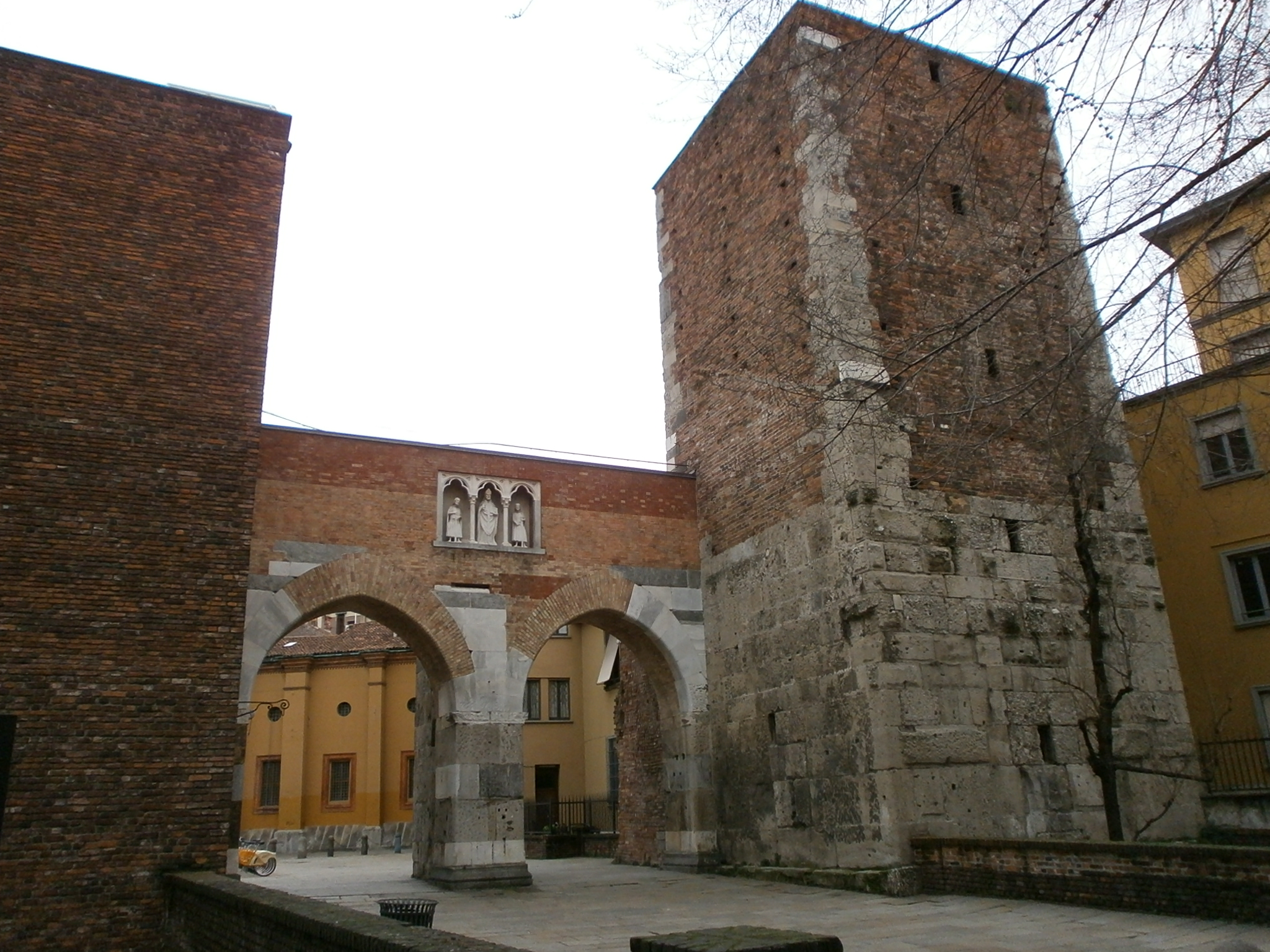
- The Postern of Saint Ambrose from Via Carducci
- Interactive map of Pusterla di Sant'Ambrogio (Milan)
- Country: Italy
- Region: Lombardy
- Municipality: Milan
- Construction: 1171 AD (restored in 1939)

The Pusterla di Sant’Ambrogio (Postern of Saint Ambrose in English) is a minor or secondary gate in the Medieval walls of Milan; the rebuilt Romanesque-style tower and pedestrian arches is located on Via Carducci #41, near the Castello Cova and some 50 meters west of the entrance of the Basilica di Sant'Ambrogio in the center of Milan, region of Lombardy, Italy.

The medieval walls of Milan were constructed after multiple disasters had devastated Milan, including 11th-century urban fires and a highly destructive sack by the emperor Barbarossa in 1162. This postern was one of the ten secondary gates and until the 1930s, its outer face was near the bank of a navigli (canal), which ran along the present via Carducci.

In the 16th century, when a new larger set of walls and moats were completed under the Spanish administration of the city, and the Pusterla of Saint Ambrose was turned into a prison. In 1939 this postern was restored to a more original form, stripping buildings and homes that had been added over the centuries.

The Pusterla di Sant’Ambrogio is sited near the Basilica of Sant'Ambrogio, one of the most ancient and important churches in Milan. Above the two arches of the gate there is a tabernacle with three icons, depicting Saint Ambrose, the city's patron; Saint Gervase; and Saint Protase.

== Sources and links ==
- Media related to Pusterla di Sant'Ambrogio (Milan) at Wikimedia Commons
- Le città d'arte:Milano, Guide brevi Skira, ed.2008, autori vari. (Italian language edition)
