= Colonne di San Lorenzo =

Group of ancient Roman ruins in Italy

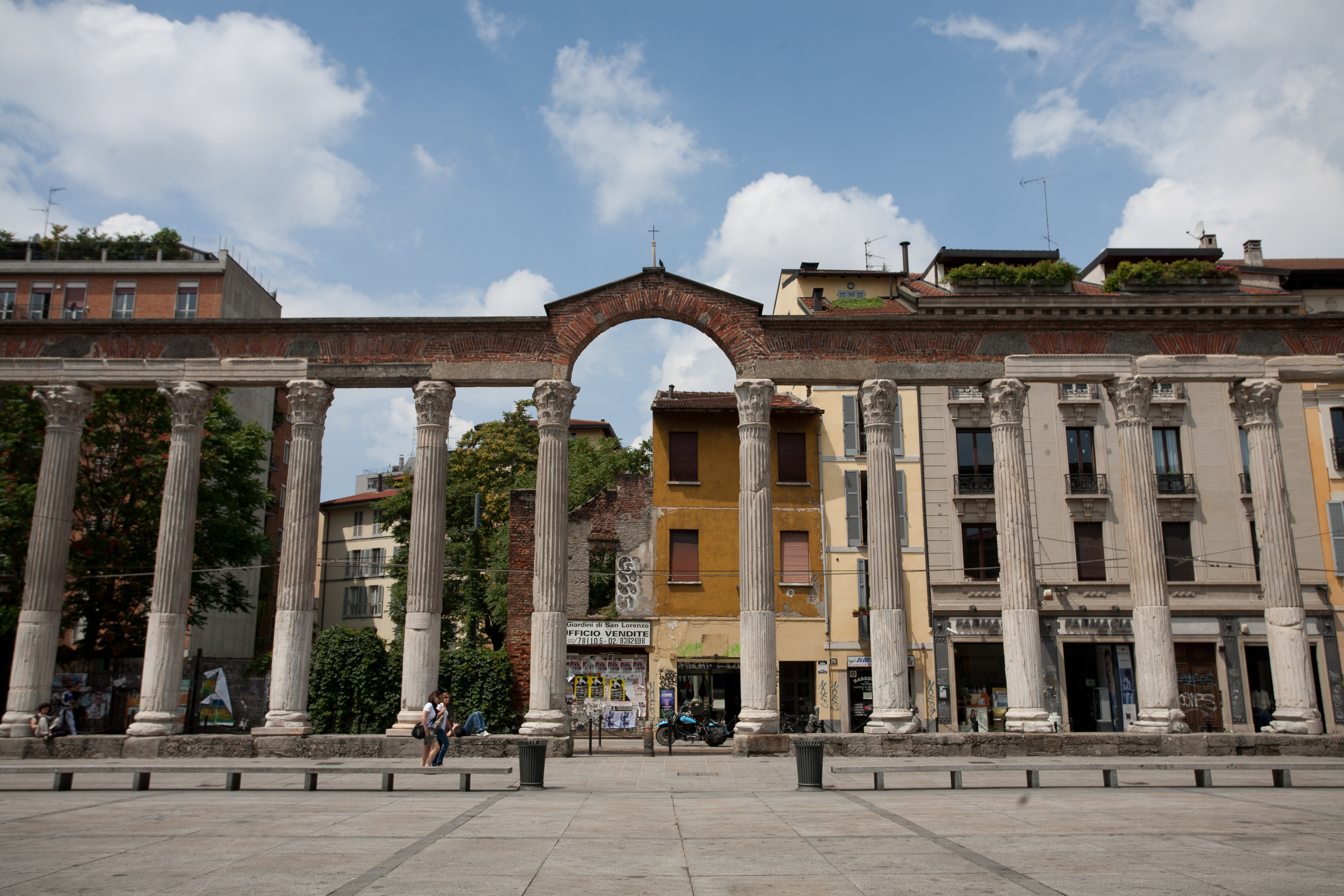

- Colonne di San Lorenzo
- 45.4582°N 9.1810°E
- Location: Milan, Lombardy
- Region: Italy

The Colonne di San Lorenzo or Columns of San Lorenzo is a group of ancient Roman ruins, located in front of the Basilica of San Lorenzo in central Milan, region of Lombardy, northern Italy.

== History ==
The colonnade, consisting of sixteen tall Corinthian columns arranged in a row, now faces an open square. In the 4th century, the columns were relocated to this site, likely salvaged from a 2nd-century pagan temple or public bathhouse. South of the colonnade, one of the medieval gates retains elements of Roman marble decoration. In the 16th century, during preparations for the ceremonial entrance of Philip II of Spain into Milan, plans were made to dismantle the colonnade to widen the procession route; however, Ferrante Gonzaga declined the proposal.

Until 1935, the area between the church and the colonnade was densely built, with old houses abutting the façade of the church. In fact, the entire complex was surrounded by such structures. Although initial plans aimed to preserve this historic urban fabric, renovations ultimately led to the demolition of the houses and the isolation of the monument’s front side. Following bombing during World War II, the complex became isolated on the rear side as well. The area behind the church was later converted into the fenced Basilicas Park, allowing unobstructed public views of the Basilica.
