= San Vittore al Corpo, Milan =

Roman Catholic church and monastery in Milan, Italy

Coordinates: 45°27′46″N 9°10′12″E

Monastery and church of San Vittore al Corpo
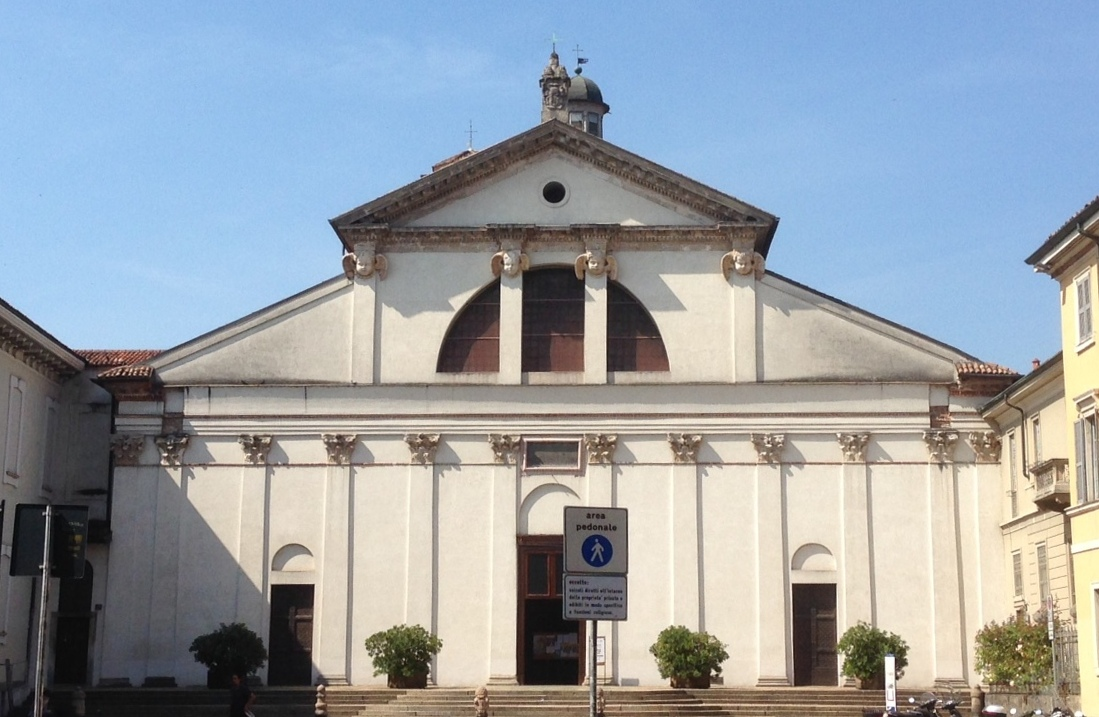
- Church of San Vittore al Corpo
- Interactive map of the Monastery and church of San Vittore al Corpo area

General information
- Location: Milan, Italy

The church and monastery of San Vittore al Corpo were an ancient monastery of the Olivetan order built in the early 16th century. The site was once a fourth century Roman imperial mausoleum of Maximian, that may also have held the burials of the emperors Gratian and Valentinian II, though they were more likely buried in another mausoleum, now the Chapel of Saint Aquilinus in the Basilica of Saint Lawrence. The basilica was enlarged in the 8th century to house the relics of the saints Vittore and Satiro. A Benedictine monastery soon was attached to the church. In 1507, the monastery was transferred to the Olivetans, who began a major reconstruction. Reconstruction of the church was begun in 1533 by Vincenzo Seregni, and completed in 1568 by Pellegrino Tibaldi. The façade remains incomplete. The dome was frescoed in 1617 by Guglielmo Caccia (called "il Moncalvo"). In the chapel of St Anthony is a 1619 canvas by Daniele Crespi (Death of St Paul the hermit). In the transept on the left, is an early 17th-century cycle of canvases of the Stories of San Benedetto, by Ambrogio Figino while the right transept has three altarpieces by Camillo Procaccini. Other chapels have paintings by Pompeo Batoni and Giovanni Battista Discepoli.

During the Napoleonic wars, the site became a military hospital, and afterwards became barracks. It suffered damage during the bombardments of 1943. The monastery now houses a museum of science, the Museo Nazionale Scienza e Tecnologia Leonardo da Vinci.

== See also ==
- Early Christian churches in Milan
- 16th-century Western domes

== Bibliography ==
- D. Caporusso & A. Ceresa Mori, C'era una volta Mediolanum, in Archeo (attualità dal passato) of settembre 2010, n. 307.
- Marco Bona Castellotti, Giovan Battista Discepoli, ad vocem, in Dizionario Biografico degli Italiani, volume 40, Roma 1991.
- Silvia Lusuardi Siena, Milano (Mediolanum): Il recinto di S.Vittore al Corpo, in Catalogo della Mostra "Milano capitale dell'Impero romani (286-402 d.C.)", a cura di Gemma Sena Chiesa, Milano 1990.
- Agnoldomenico Pica, Piero Portaluppi, La Basilica Porziana di San Vittore al Corpo, Milano 1934
