= Basilica vetus =

Ruined church in Milan

Coordinates: 45.46425053°N 9.19198808°E

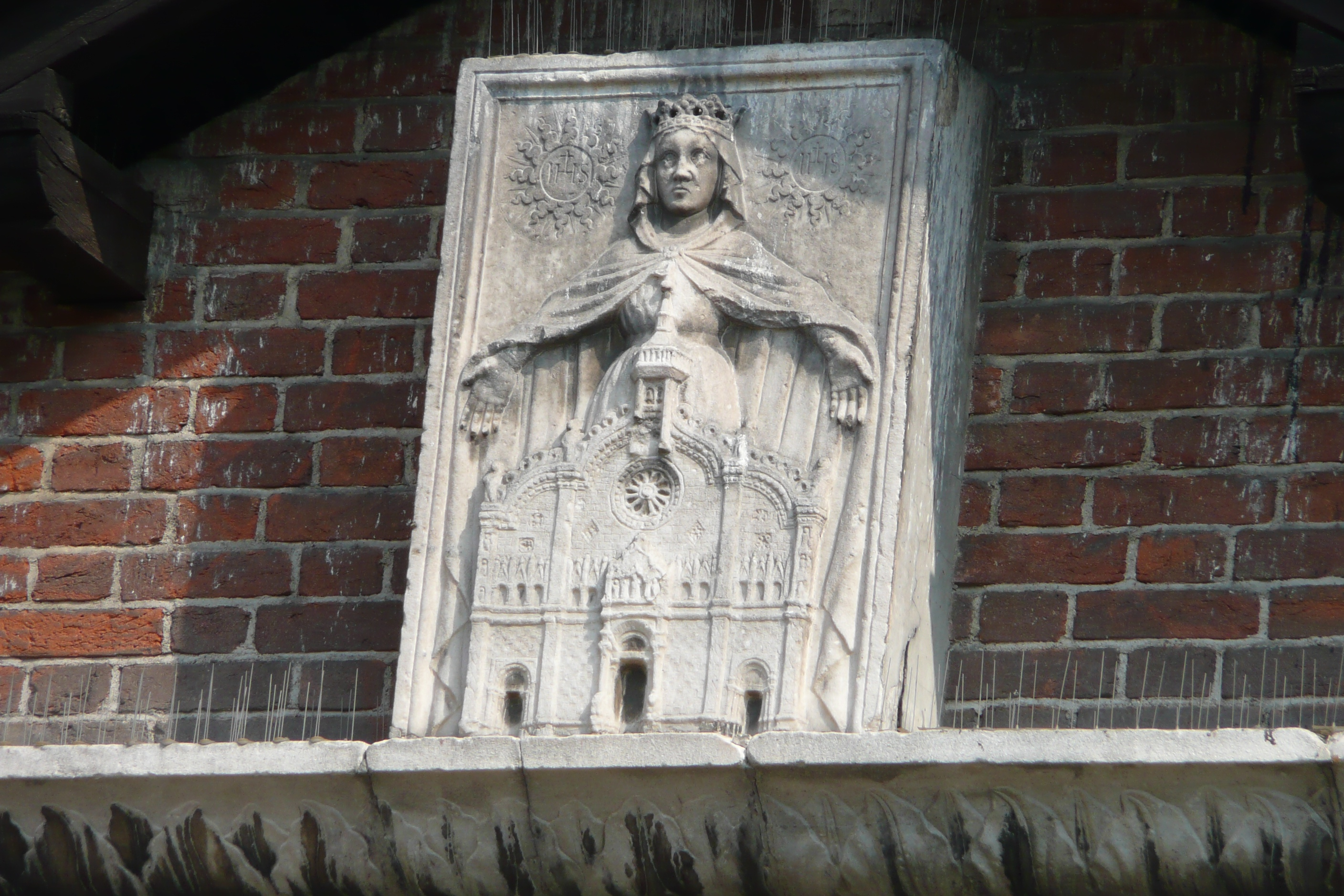
The coat of arms of the Fabbrica del Duomo shows the Santa Maria Maggiore's facade under the mantle of the Virgin Mary (Milan, Viarenna navigation lock)

Santa Maria Maggiore, called the basilica vetus (old basilica) or basilica minor (minor basilica), was a church in Milan, established in 313, which served as co-cathedral alongside Santa Tecla until it was torn down after 1386 to make room for the modern cathedral. It served as the winter cathedral, while Santa Tecla was that of the summer.

== See also ==
- Early Christian churches in Milan
