= Early Christian churches in Milan =

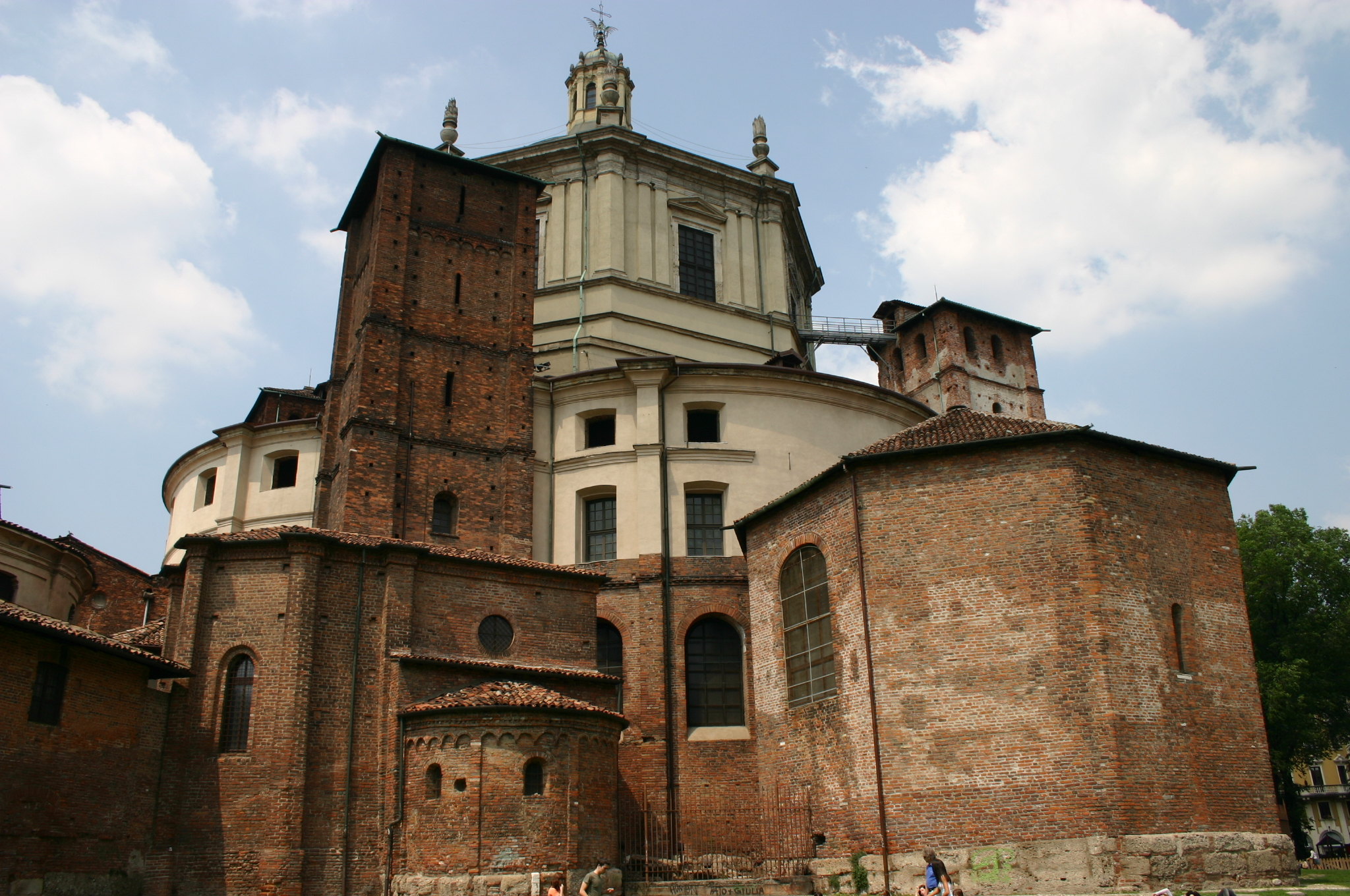
External view of the apses of the Basilica of San Lorenzo Maggiore in Milan, Italy

Early Christian churches in Milan are the first churches built immediately after the Edict of Milan (Edictum Mediolanense) in February 313, issued by Constantine the Great and Licinius, which granted tolerance and religious liberty to Christianity within the Roman Empire. "Mediolanum" was the name of the Roman city that became present-day Milan.

== Historical and artistic context ==
Ever since the fall of the Severan dynasty, which ruled the Roman Empire between 193 and 235, rivals for the imperial throne had bid for support by either favouring or persecuting Christians. During the following period known as the crisis of the Third Century (235–284 AD) the Roman Empire nearly collapsed under the combined pressures of invasion, civil war, plague, and economic depression. The Crisis began with the assassination of Emperor Alexander Severus at the hands of his own troops, initiating a fifty-year period in which 20–25 claimants to the title of Emperor, mostly prominent Roman army generals, assumed imperial power over all or part of the Empire.

During the Civil wars of the Tetrarchy, starting in 306 AD with the usurpation of Maxentius and the defeat of Flavius Valerius Severus, and ending with the defeat of Licinius at the hands of Constantine I in 324 AD, Diocletian moved the capital of the Western Roman Empire from Rome to Mediolanum, the ancient Milan. Diocletian chose to reside at Nicomedia in the Eastern Empire, leaving his colleague Maximian at Mediolanum. Maximian built several gigantic monuments, the large circus (470 m × 85 m (1,542 ft × 279 ft)), the thermae or "Baths of Hercules", a large complex of imperial palaces, and other services and buildings of which fewer visible traces remain. Maximian increased the city area surrounded by a new, larger stone wall (about 4.5 km (2.8 mi) long) with many 24-sided towers.

Wherefore, for this our indulgence, they ought to pray to their God for our safety, for that of the republic, and for their own, that the commonwealth may continue uninjured on every side, and that they may be able to live securely in their homes.

— Edict of Toleration by Galerius (311 AD)

the same shall be restored to the Christians without payment or any claim of recompense and without any kind of fraud or deception

— Edict of Milan (313 AD)

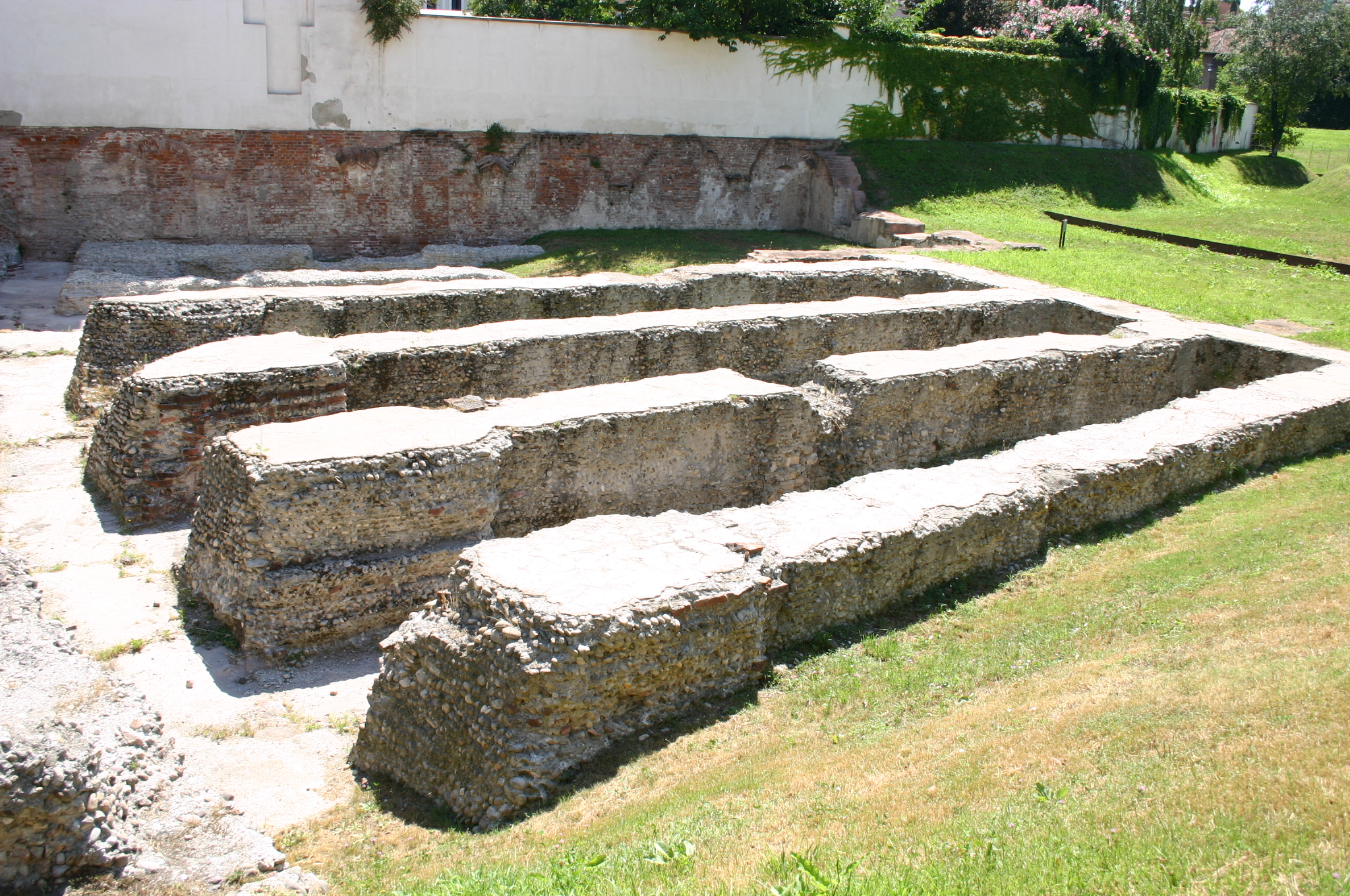
Remains of the amphitheatre of Milan

An edict of toleration was issued by the emperor Galerius from Serdica and posted at Nicomedia on 30 April 311. By its provisions, the Christians, who had "followed such a caprice and had fallen into such a folly that they would not obey the institutes of antiquity", were granted an indulgence. Their confiscated property, however, was not restored until 313 when instructions were given for the Christians' meeting places and other properties were to be returned and compensation paid by the state to the current owners: The Christian community of Mediolanum is alleged to have contributed its share of martyrs during the Persecutions of the Church, but the first bishop of Mediolanum who has a firm historical presence is Mirocles, who was at the Council of Rome of 313.

It was from Mediolanum that the Emperor Constantine issued the Edict of Milan in 313 AD, granting tolerance to all religions within the Empire, thus paving the way for Christianity to become the dominant religion of the Empire. Constantine was in Mediolanum to celebrate the wedding of his sister to the Eastern Emperor, Licinius. The agreement between Constantine and Licinius directed the provincial magistrates to execute its orders at once and with all energy, so that public order may be restored and the continuance of the Divine favour may "preserve and prosper our successes together with the good of the state." It marked the beginning of profound and radical transformations; the encouragement of Christian worship led to the methodical destruction of Christian monuments invisible to the authorities.

Stones taken from the amphitheatre have been recognized in the foundations of the Basilica of San Lorenzo (English: Basilica of Saint Lawrence; 45°27′30″N 09°10′55″E), indicating the demolition of the large building (129.5 m × 109.3 m (425 ft × 359 ft)) This use was justified because of the presence of waterways around the area where San Lorenzo was built, and because there was a scarce presence of large stones in Milan, being in a plain clay. Whether this fact, the positioning of the famous columns before the courtyard indicates that the building of the great cathedrals of the imperial era was also done at the expense of Roman buildings.

== Constantinian churches ==
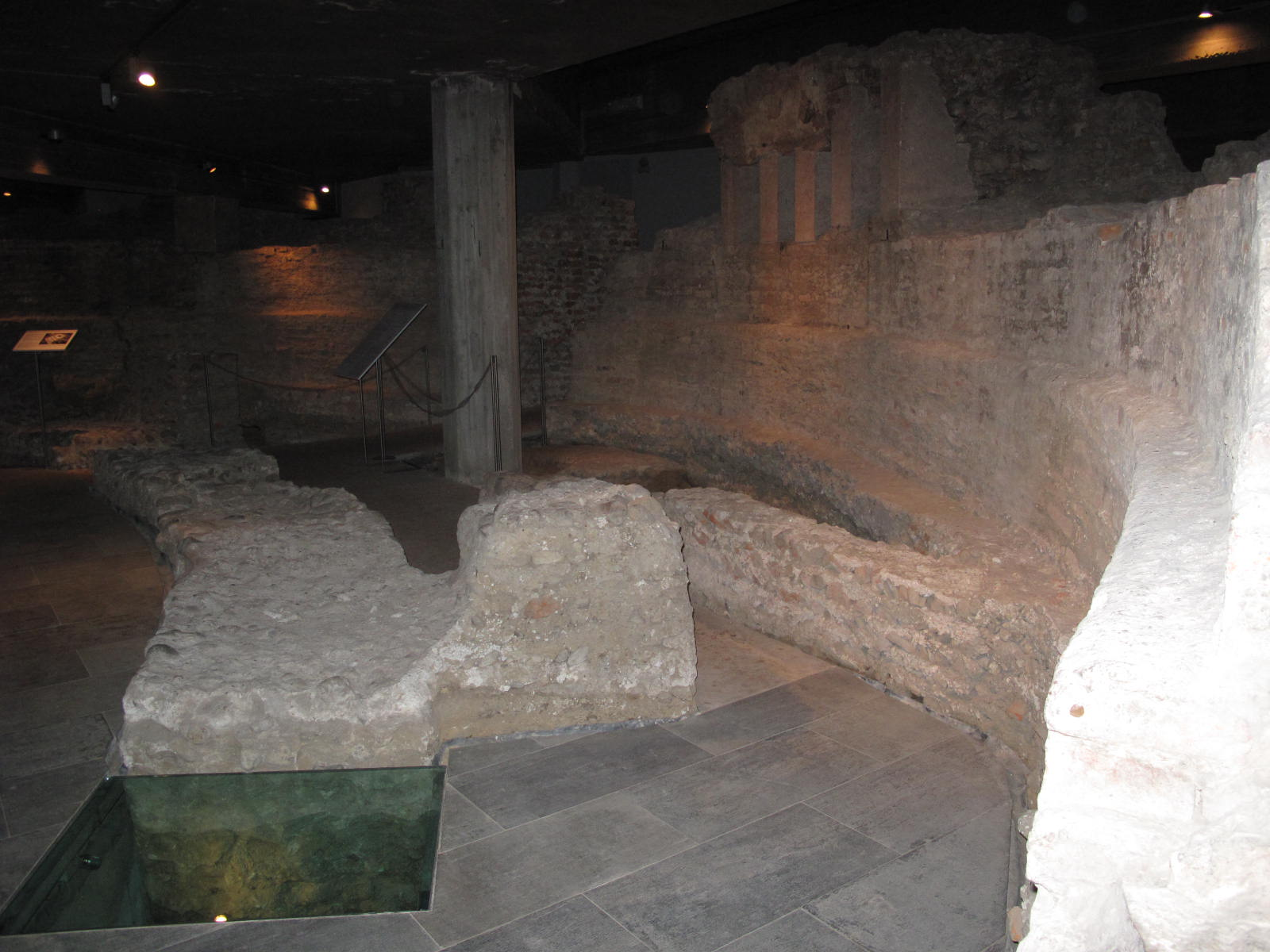
Basilica di Santa Tecla. The ruins of the apse.

The early Christian basilicas in Mediolanum can be divided into several categories, corresponding to their periods.

The first basilicas we know are divided into two separate churches, one for the baptized, being the sacrament of baptism at that time granted only upon completion of a process of conversion and spiritual purification, and the other for catechumens. This particular arrangement perhaps derived from horrea, a type of public warehouse used during the ancient Roman period, such as the ancient buildings of Aquileia. The Basilica di Santa Tecla (45°27′50″N 45°27′50″E), whose ruins can be visited under the Milan Cathedral, has apse of traditional type, reminiscent of those of the churches annexed to great civic buildings.

A later stage corresponds to that of the great cathedrals of the late Roman Empire. They are formed by a polygonal shape and cross-stitch. These churches became models for some of the largest and most famous basilicas of the later Roman Empire, such as those in Constantinople.

The religious center of the city, now Piazza del Duomo, included two cathedrals: the basilica vetus or basilica minor used during the winter season; and the basilica nova or basilica major for use in summer. Details about these churches are limited, as the Milan Cathedral was built over them.

- Basilica vetus (313)
- Basilica di Santa Tecla / Basilica maior
- Basilica of San Lorenzo (c. 370)

Ambrose, a late 4th-century bishop of Mediolanum, dominated the life and development of the city during his episcopate. He was appointed bishop of on 7 December 374. One of the four original doctors of the Church, he is patron saint of Milan.

When Auxentius, the Arian Christian bishop of Mediolanum died, the sectarian violence in the city increased between the Nicene Christians and Arians. The new Nicene bishop Ambrose, who was also consularis (governor) of the conjoined Liguria-Aemilia provinces, arrived with soldiers from the Roman army to suppress the violence by force. According to Ambrose's Sermon Against Auxentius and his 76th Epistle when the bishop was summoned to the court of the boy-emperor Valentinian II (r. 375–392) and his Arian Christian mother Justina in 385, the Nicene Christians appeared en masse to support him, threatening the emperor's security and offering themselves to be martyred by the army. In March 386, the court asked that the city's summer-time cathedral, the Basilica Nova, be made available for the Arians for Easter; Ambrose refused. On Palm Sunday, Ambrose rejected the court's request to use the Portian Basilica (now the Basilica of San Vittore al Corpo) instead, and the Nicene Christians occupied the building. On Holy Wednesday, the army surrounded the Portian Basilica, but Ambrose held a service at the wintertime Basilica Vetus, after which the Nicenes moved to rescue their co-religionists in the Portian Basilica, among them Augustine of Hippo and his mother, chanting Psalm 79.

== Ambrosian churches ==
With the Roman governor and bishop Ambrose began a program to build basilicas dedicated to various categories: a basilica for the prophets, one for the apostles (San Nazaro in Brolo), one for the martyrs (martyrium, which later housed his remains and became the Basilica of Sant'Ambrogio), one for the virgins (Basilica of San Simpliciano).

The first Ambrosian church in Milan was founded by Saint Ambrose in the 4th century. This church, known as the Basilica Ambrosiana, became the center of the Ambrosian Rite, which is still used in some parts of the world today. Other Ambrosian churches were later built in Milan and other cities in Italy, but the Basilica Ambrosiana remains the most important and influential of these.

- Basilica martyrium / Basilica of Sant'Ambrogio (379–386)
- San Nazaro in Brolo (382–397)
- Basilica of San Simpliciano
- Basilica Salvatoris/Basilica of San Dionigi

== Other churches ==
Other early Christian churches in Milan that preserve some of their Palaeo-Christian appearance are:

- San Vittore al Corpo (originally the imperial mausoleum of Maximian (r. 285–305, 306–310))
- Basilica di San Calimero (5th-century, rebuilt 19th century)
- San Vincenzo in Prato (8th-century)

== Bibliography ==
- Colish, Marcia L. (2002). "Why the Portiana?: Reflections on the Milanese Basilica Crisis of 386". Journal of Early Christian Studies. 10 (3). Project MUSE: 361–372. doi:10.1353/earl.2002.0038.
- De Vecchi, Pierluigi; Cerchiari, Elda (1999). I tempi dell'arte [The Times of the Art] (in Italian). Vol. 1. Milan: Bompiani.
