= San Vincenzo in Prato =

Church in Milan, Italy

Coordinates: 45°27′28″N 9°10′26″E

Basilica of Saint Vincent in Prato (Basilica Prepositurale di San Vincenzo in Prato)
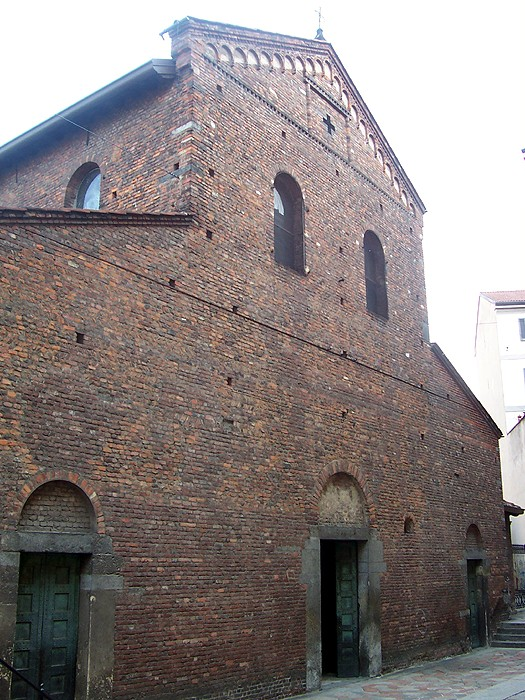
- Façade of the church

Religion
- Affiliation: Roman Catholic
- Province: Milan
- Ecclesiastical or organisational status: National monument
- Year consecrated: 900
- Status: Active

Location
- Location: Milan, Italy
- Interactive map of Basilica of Saint Vincent in Prato (Basilica Prepositurale di San Vincenzo in Prato)

Architecture
- Type: Church
- Style: Palaeo-Christian

Website
- Sito ufficiale della Parrocchia

The basilica of San Vincenzo in Prato is a Roman Catholic church located in Via Daniele Crespi 6, in Milan, region of Lombardy, Italy. The church maintains most of its original Palaeo-Christian appearance.

== History ==
The first church was founded by the Lombard king Desiderius in 770, who dedicated it to the Virgin Mary. Later it was entitled to St. Vincent, when the latter's relics were found in an urn in the crypt, together with those of St. Quirinus and St. Nicomedes (859) and St. Abundius. The name in Prato derives from its location in the "pratum" (in the field) area owned by bishop Odelpertus.

In 806 a Benedictine convent was added to the church; in the late years of the same century and in the early tenth century the deteriorating church was rebuilt, but with similar appearance. The octagonal baptistery on the exterior, on the left, was built by architect Paolo Mezzanotte in year 1932, and includes a column-shaped font called Pietra santa (the Saint Stone) coming from the ancient church of S. Nazaro in Pietra Santa, which was demolished in year 1889 during the construction of the new Via Dante. The convent was suppressed in 1520 and in 1598 the church was restored and turned into a parish.

== Architecture ==
The basilica measures c. 40 m × 20 m (130 ft × 66 ft), and is in brickwork. The interior is on a nave and two aisles with wooden spans ceiling. The columns are from different ages. The elevated choir ends with a large apse. Under the presbytery is the crypt, which has also a nave and two aisles divided by ten small columns with sculpted capitals.

San Vincenzo lies on the founding of a Roman temple or oratory built along the way to Vigevano probably dedicated to Jupiter, which was located within a Roman necropolis (of which some remains are visible in the external left walls of the church).

== See also ==
- Early Christian churches in Milan

== Gallery ==
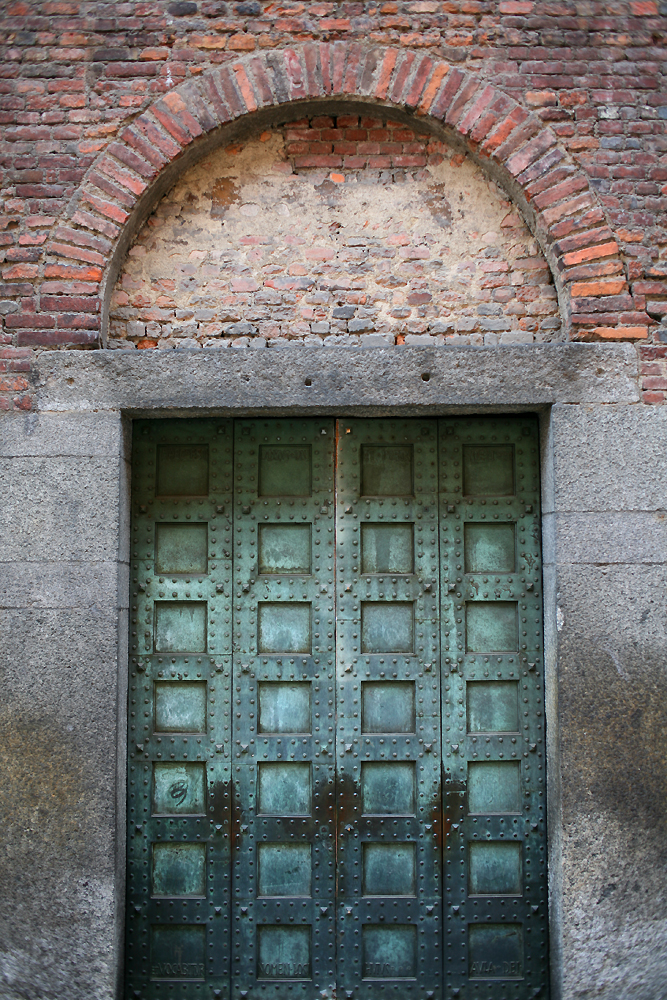
The portal by Geminiano Cibau

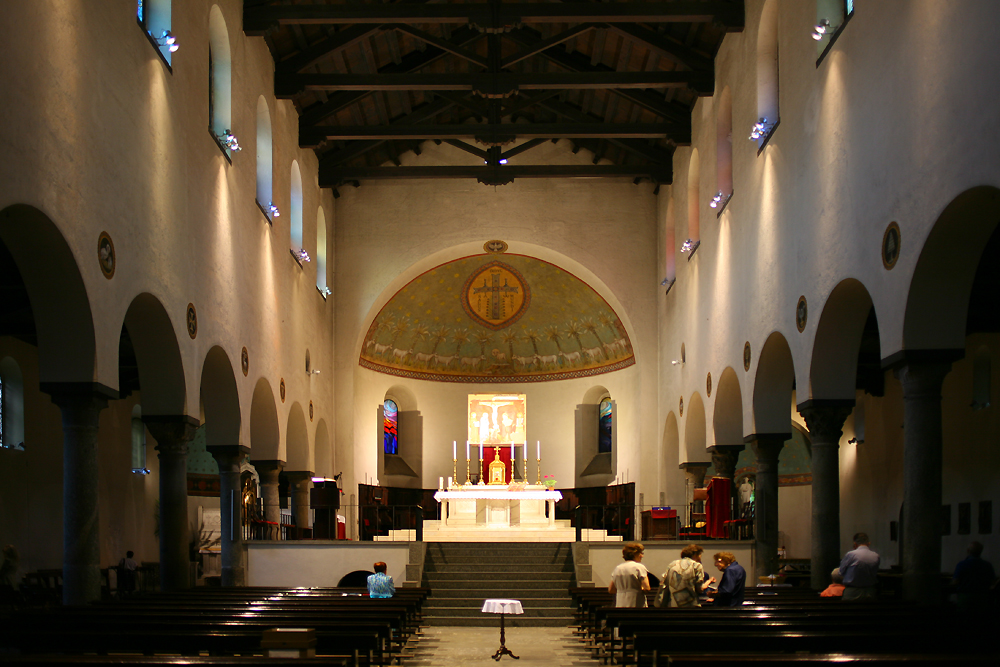
View of the interior

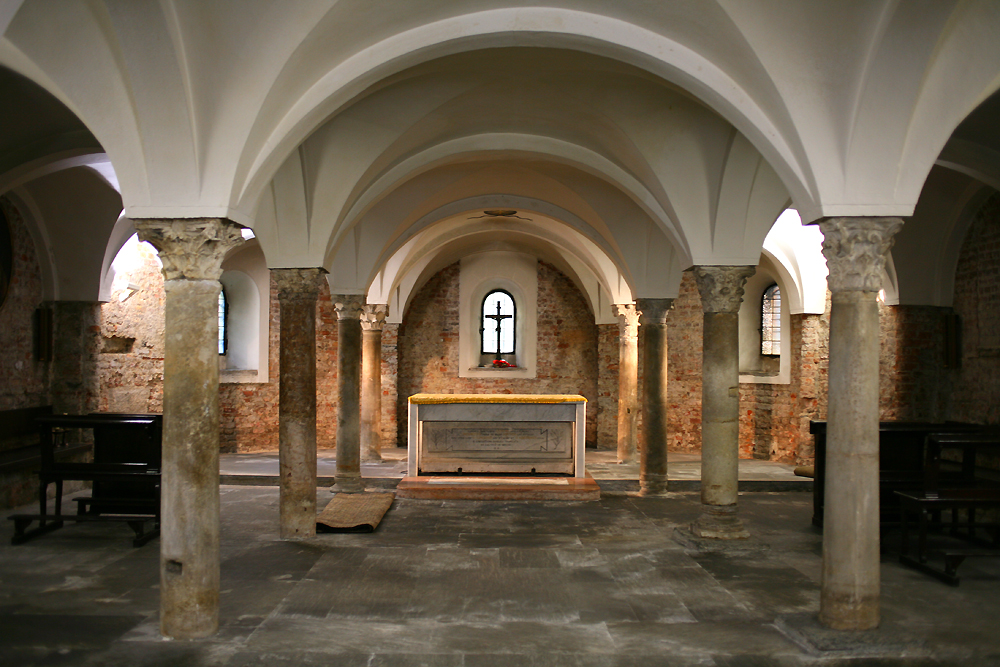
The crypt

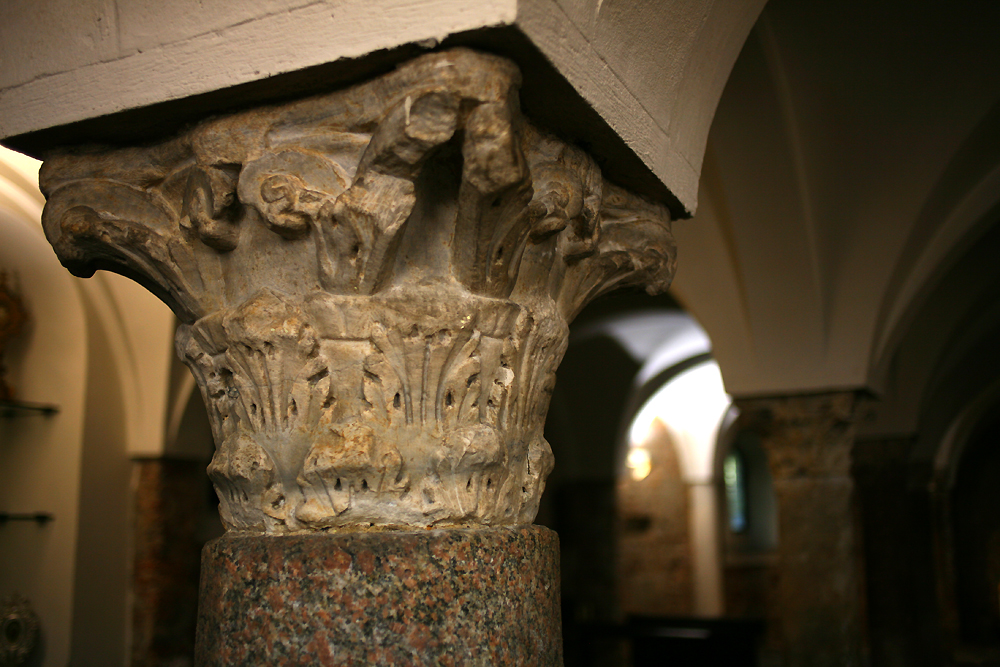
A capital in the crypt

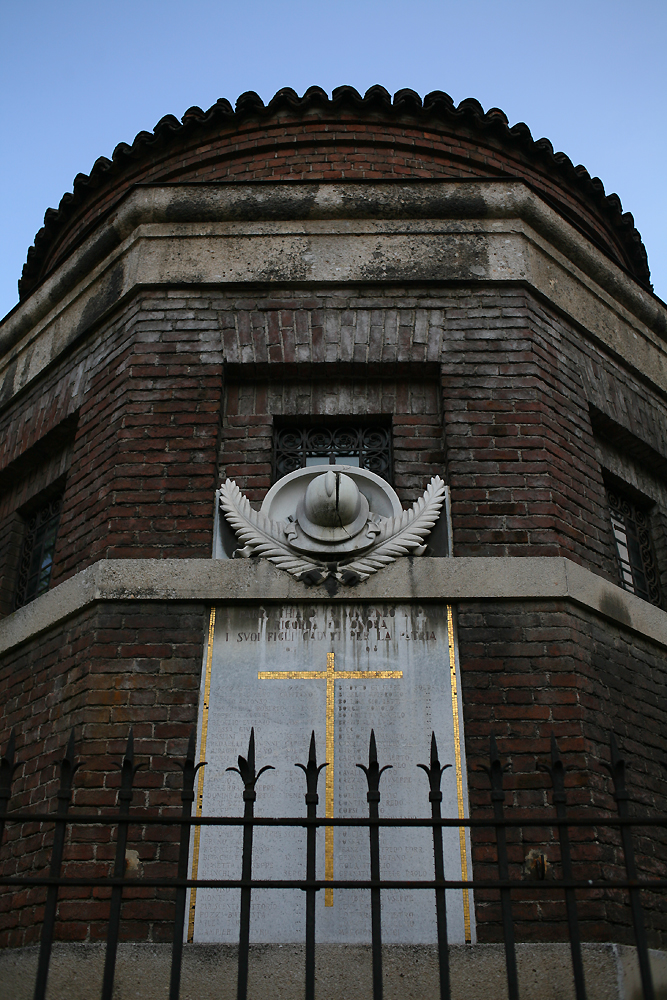
The external baptistery

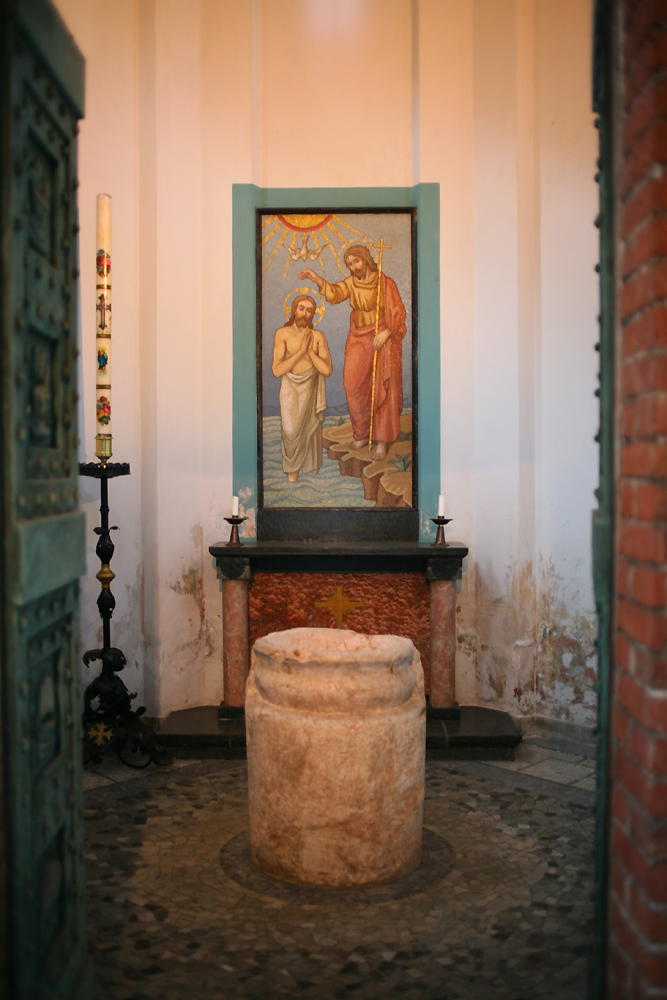
The saint stone coming from San Nazaro in Pietrasanta
