= Aquilinus of Milan =

Saint Aquilinus of Milan
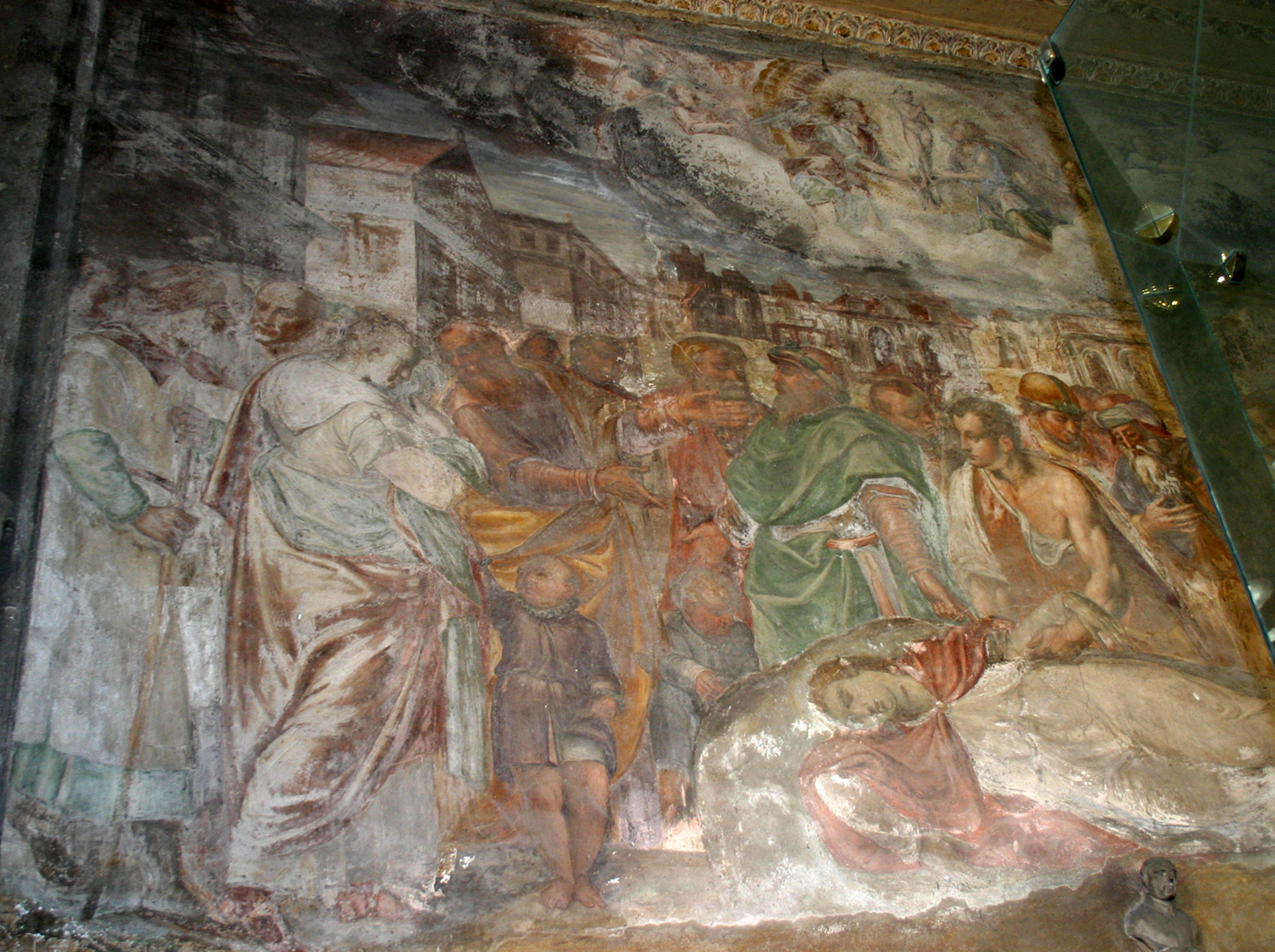
- Carlo Urbino, The Rediscovery of Saint Aquilinus of Cologne's Corpse, a fresco behind the main altar in the Cappella di Sant'Aquilino in the Basilica of San Lorenzo, Milan in Milan, Italy.
- Born: Würzburg
- Died: 650 or 1015 AD; Milan
- Venerated in: Roman Catholic Church, Eastern Orthodox Church
- Major shrine: Basilica of San Lorenzo, Milan
- Feast: January 29
- Attributes: sword through his neck
- Patronage: hotel porters (facchini) in Milan

Saint Aquilinus of Milan (died 1015), also known as Aquilinus of Cologne (Italian: Sant'Aquilino), is venerated as a martyr by the Catholic Church and the Eastern Orthodox Church. He was a missionary priest and preacher in Germany and various other European countries. He was canonised before the formal process of canonisation in the Catholic Church.

He should not be confused with another Aquilinus, who was killed during the reign of the Arian Vandal king Hunneric in 484. This 5th century Aquilinus was killed with Eugene, Geminus, Marcian, Quintus, Theodotus, and Tryphon. Bede writes about them. He should also not be confused with an early bishop of Cologne named Aquilinus.

== Biography ==
Born in Würzburg to a noble family, he studied theology in Cologne. He attended theological studies, where he later was ordained a priest. He was offered the bishopric of Cologne, but he refused, preferring to become a missionary priest and preacher.

He travelled to Paris, where he miraculously cured some people of the cholera. As a result, he was offered the bishopric of Paris, but this he also refused. He travelled to Pavia, where he preached against Cathars, Manichaeans, and Arians there.

He then traveled to Milan, where, according to local tradition, he was stabbed by a member of one of these sects, along with his companion Constantius (Costanzo). His body was thrown into a drain, near the Porta Ticinese. His body was found and then buried in the Basilica of San Lorenzo, Milan. The Cappella di Sant'Aquilino is dedicated to him where he is often depicted in many statues with hands together in prayer and his head raised upwards.

== Gallery ==
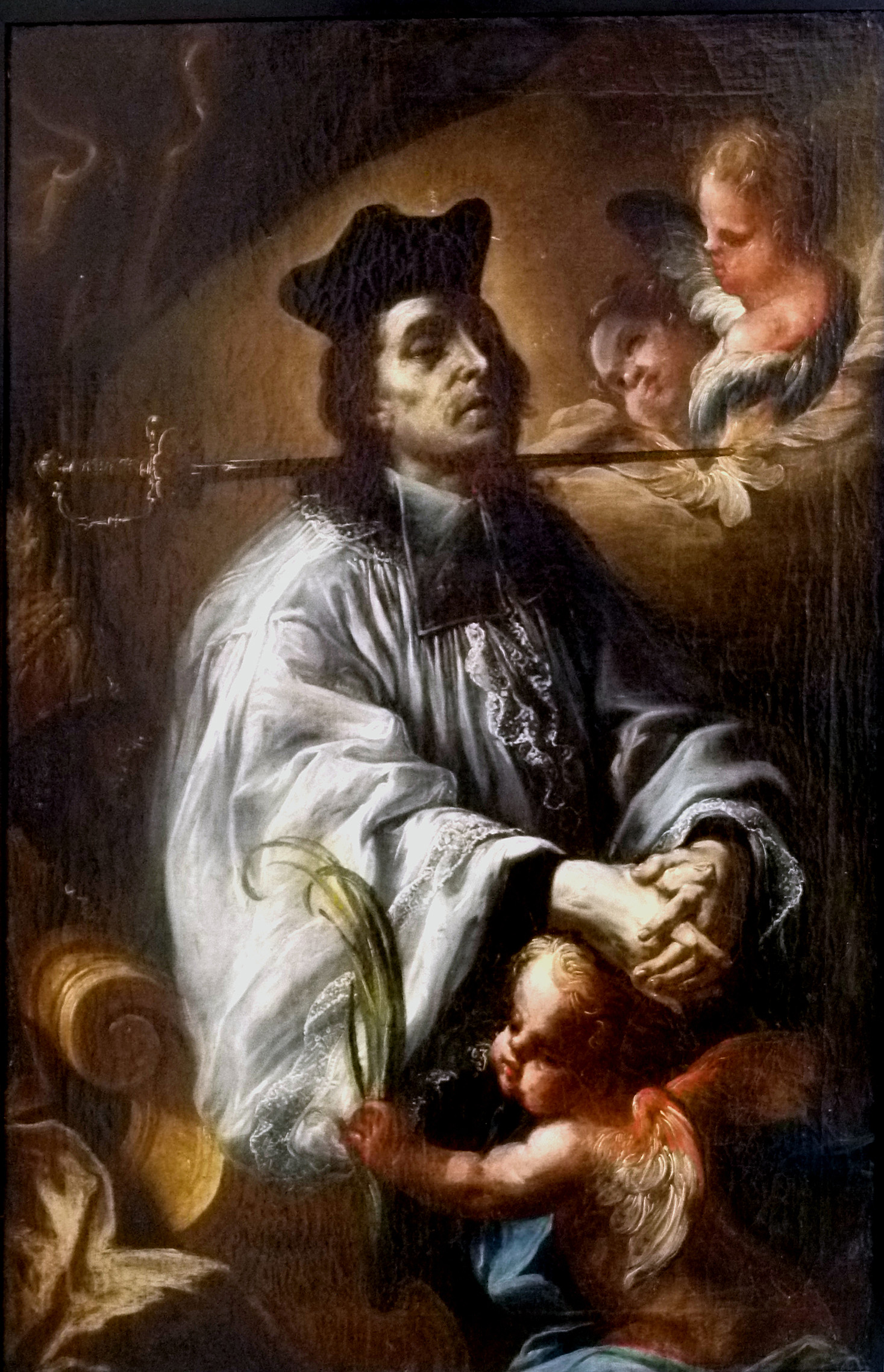
Saint Aquilinus of Milan by Simon Benedikt Faistenberger

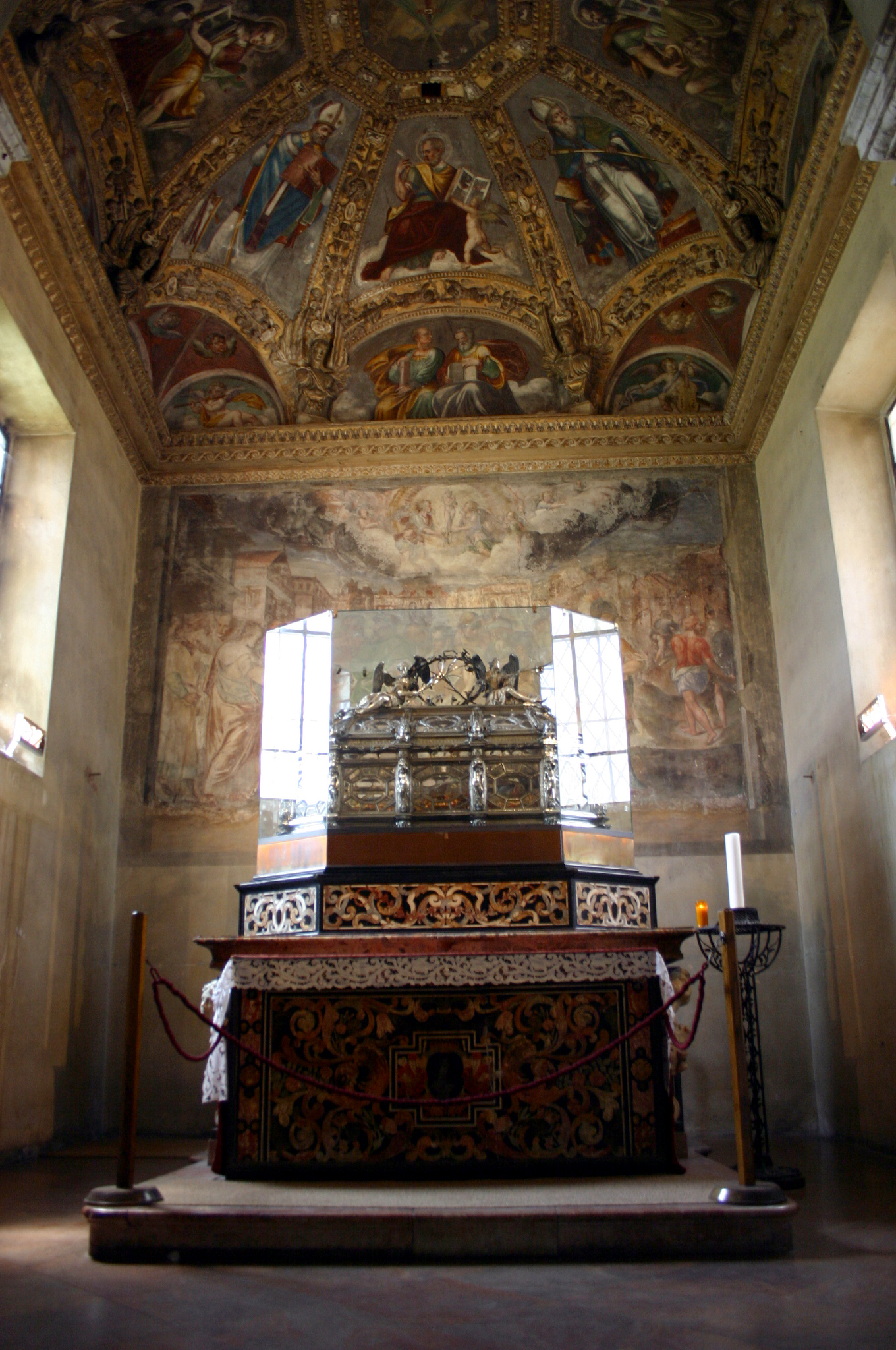
Chapel of Saint Aquilinus. Reliquary ark of Saint Aquilinus by the Lombardian architect, Carlo Garavaglia (flourished 1634–1645).

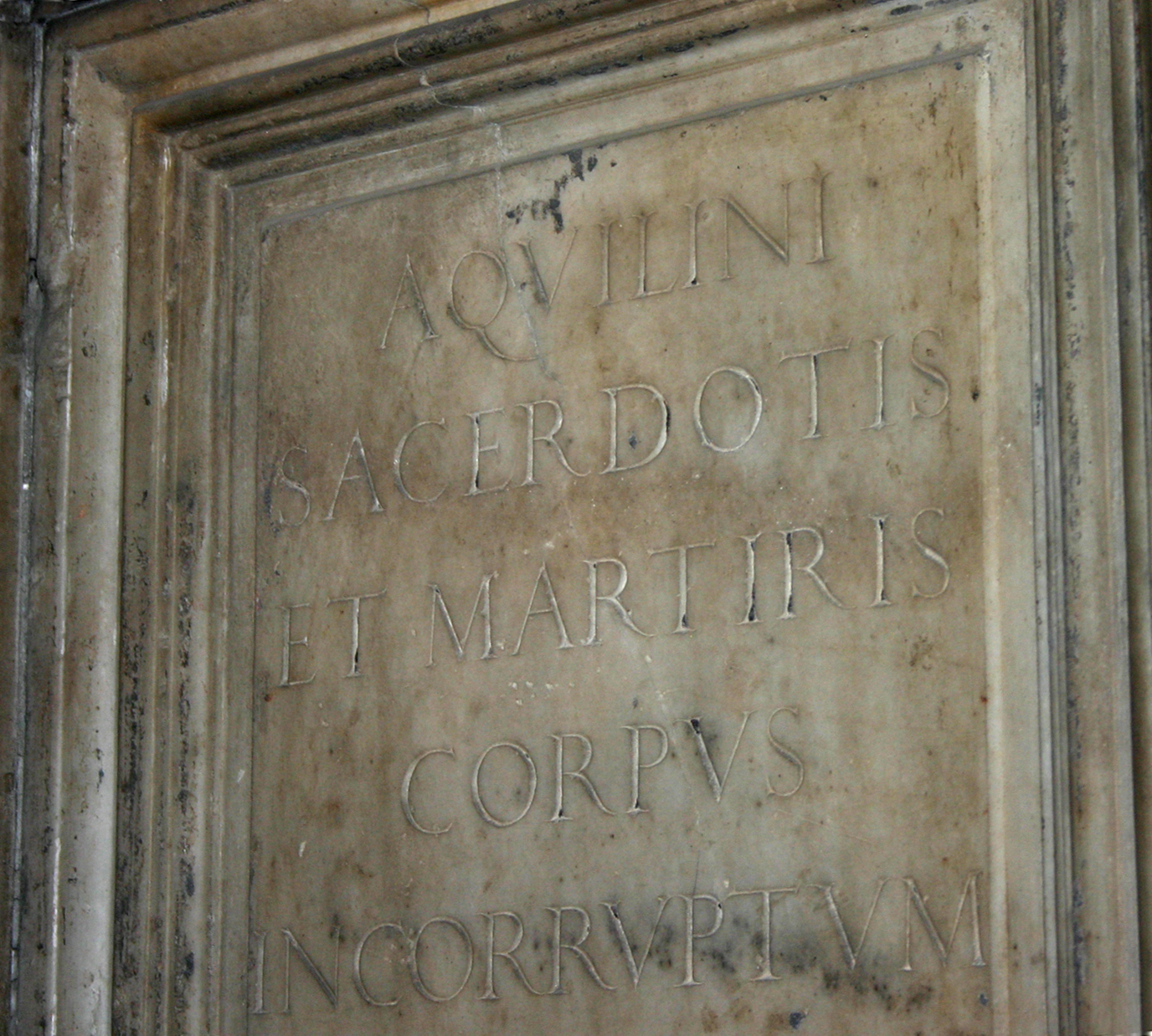
Plaque honoring Aquilinus. Chapel of Saint Aquilinus.
