= Basilica of San Lorenzo, Milan =

Roman Catholic church in Milan, Italy

Basilica of Saint Lawrence Basilica di San Lorenzo
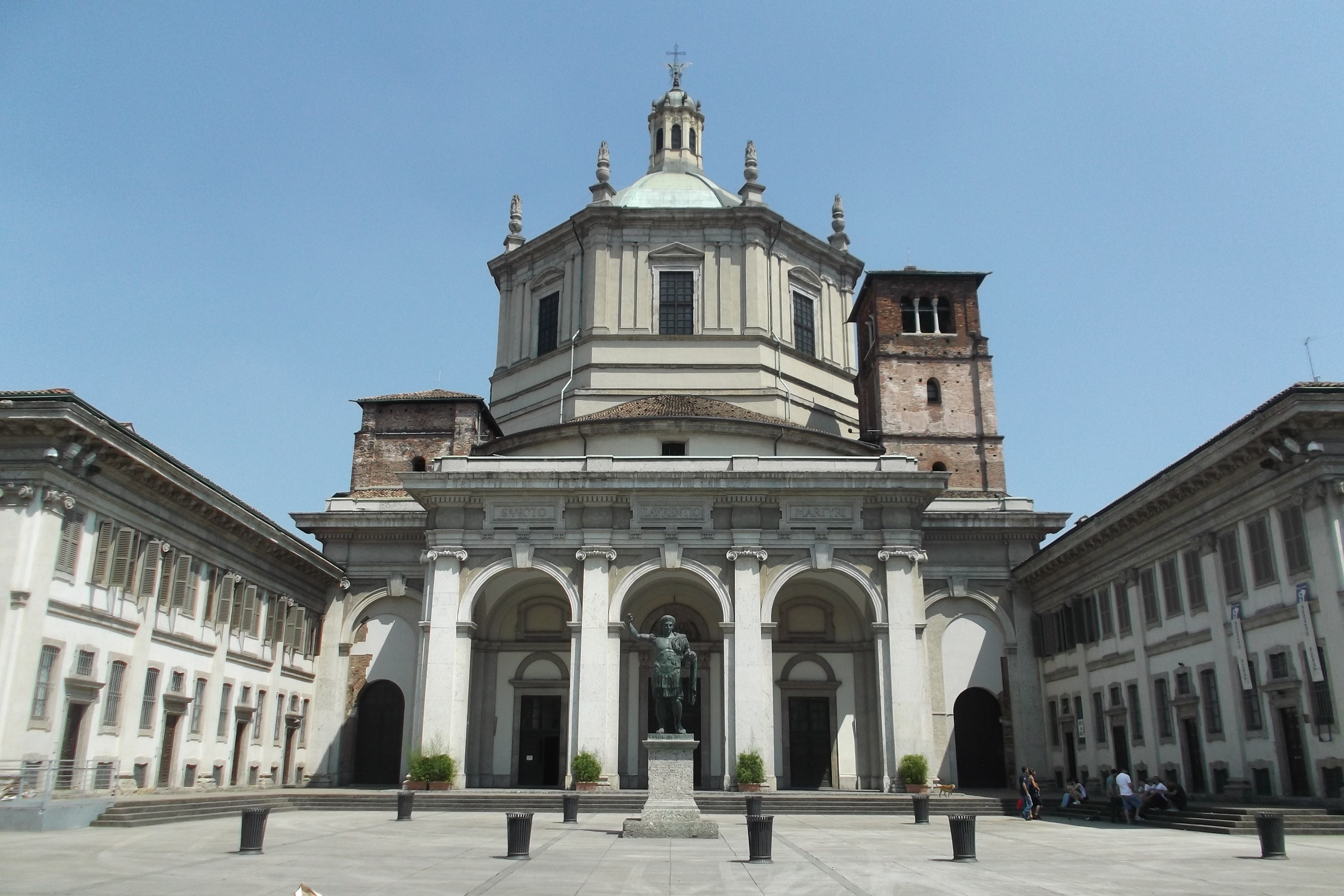

Religion
- Affiliation: Roman Catholic
- Province: Archdiocese of Milan
- Rite: Ambrosian
- Ecclesiastical or organisational status: Basilica
- Year consecrated: 402
- Status: Active

Location
- Location: Milan, Italy
- Interactive map of Basilica of Saint Lawrence; Basilica di San Lorenzo
- Coordinates: 45°27′30″N 09°10′55″E

Architecture
- Type: Basilica
- Style: Early Christian, Renaissance, Baroque
- Groundbreaking: 364
- Completed: 18th century

Website
- sanlorenzomaggiore.com

The Basilica of San Lorenzo Maggiore is a Roman Catholic church in Milan, Northern Italy. Located within the city's ring of navigli, it is one of the oldest churches in the city, originally built in Roman times, but subsequently rebuilt several times over the centuries. It is close to the medieval Porta Ticinese and near the Basilicas Park, which includes both the Basilica of San Lorenzo and the Basilica of Sant'Eustorgio, as well as the Roman Colonne di San Lorenzo. The art historians H.W. Janson and Anthony F. Janson write that it is a building of "daring originality" and "gives a glimpse of the great churches built by Constantine and his successors in Byzantium, none of which stand today."

== Origins ==
The basilica was built between the late fourth and early fifth centuries. The exact date is uncertain, as are the name of who commissioned it and the circumstances of its foundation. According to some scholars, but unconfirmed by the archaeology or inscriptions, San Lorenzo was erected to coincide with the "Basilica Portiana", which was built by the "Augustus of the West" (Valentinian I or Valentinian II) to please the Arian Bishop of Milan Auxentius (355–372). If true, San Lorenzo predates the foundation of the four Ambrosian basilicas. Contemporary sources recall that the so-called Basilica Portiana resisted the efforts of St Ambrose to wrest it from the Arians.

A second hypothesis, is that the church was founded some decades later between 390 and 402, and commissioned by Theodosius I or Stilicho. Evidence for this proposition comes from archaeological investigations carried out between 2002 and 2004. Supporters of this view are divided as to the function of the building; for some it is an imperial basilica that would have confirmed the role of Milan as the imperial capital of the West, in rivalry with Rome and Constantinople; for others, it is a mausoleum for the Theodosian dynasty.

What is certain is that at the time of its construction the basilica was the largest, centrally planned building in the West. The dedication of the temple to St. Laurence (San Lorenzo) the martyr has been certified only from 590, when Milan was already controlled by the Lombards.

== The Medieval Period and the Renaissance ==
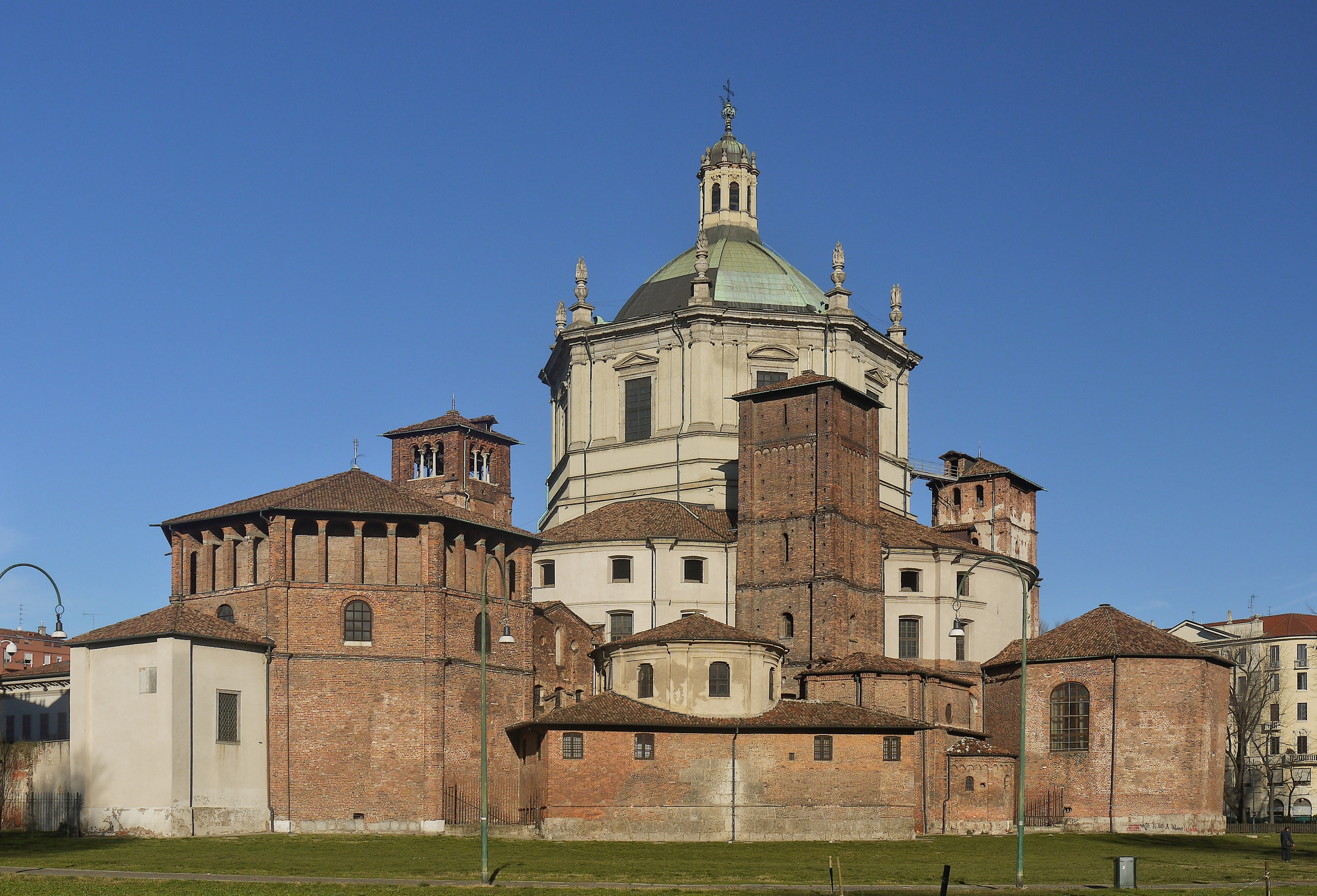
The church's exterior

While Medieval Milan underwent a period of decline, San Lorenzo maintained a leading role in the city's liturgy: as the highest place in Milan it came to represent the Mount of Olives and on Palm Sunday the bishop blessed the palms and led the procession that from there to the now-demolished Basilica of Santa Tecla.

The eleventh and twelfth centuries were marked by numerous disasters: fires, in particular, the terrible "fire of the Stork", that in 1071 devoured the basilica, devastating the internal decorations, and earthquakes, that undermined the stability of the complex, making new restorations necessary between the twelfth and thirteenth centuries. Towards the middle of the eleventh century, the open space behind the basilica, called Vetra, was used as the place of executions: this practice continued until 1840 and was reported, among others, by Alessandro Manzoni in the history of the infamous column. By 1167, with the construction of the medieval walls, the basilica was to be found within the city, at the new Porta Ticinese (Ticinese gate).

== Recent and contemporary times ==
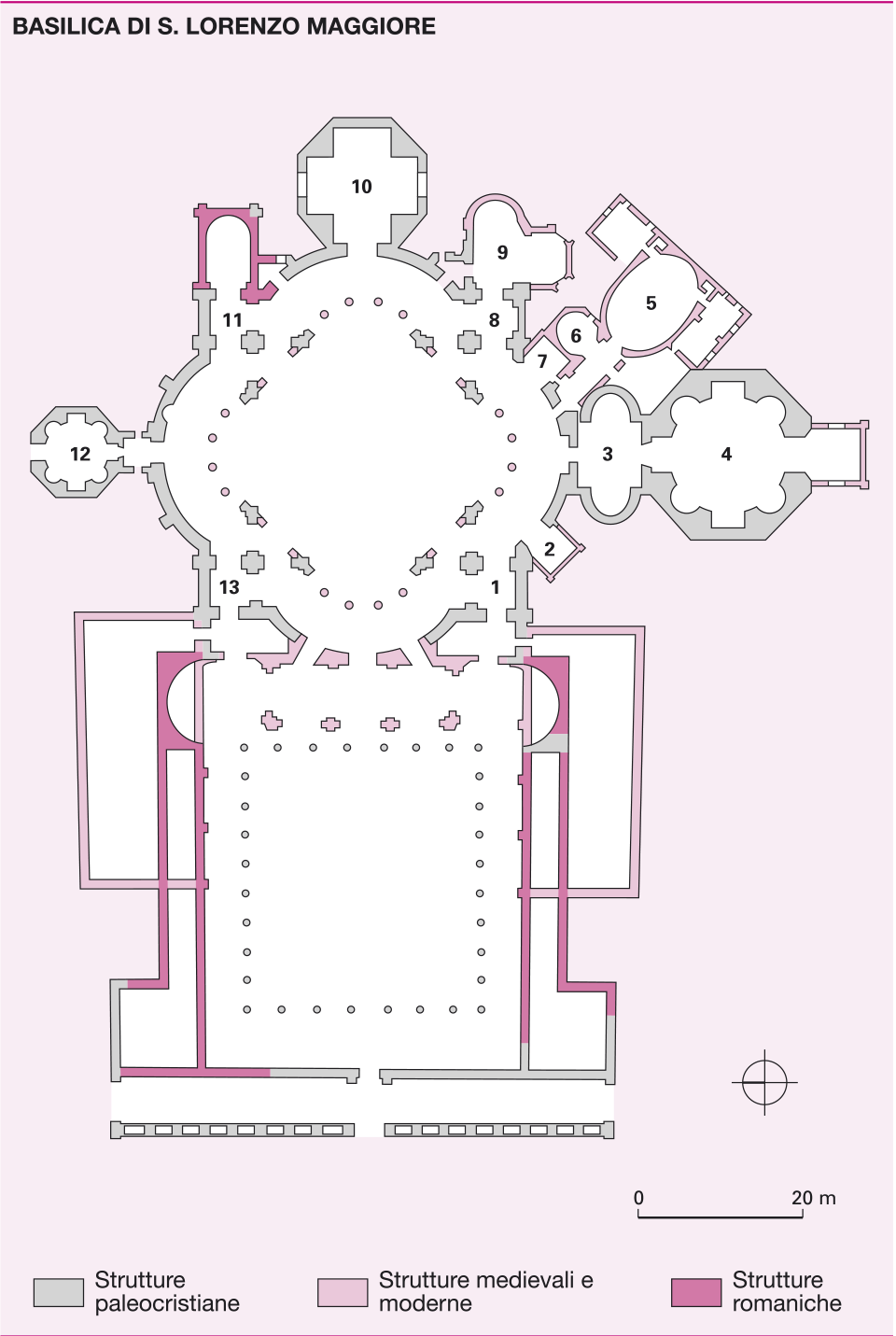
Plan of the basilica. The early Christian structures are highlighted in gray, the medieval and modern ones in light pink, and the Romanesque ones in dark pink.

The basilica of San Lorenzo remained throughout the Middle Ages a symbol of the legacy of the Roman Empire in Milan. Subsequently, during the age of the Renaissance, especially after the 1154 destruction of the other Ancient Roman structures by Emperor Barbarossa, the temple was an example of the classical architectural canons admired by humanists, and studied by architects and artists such as Bramante, Leonardo, and Giuliano da Sangallo. Painted references to the church from that era can be identified.

On 5 June 1573, the dome of the basilica suddenly collapsed, fortunately without causing casualties. Construction of a new dome in a more modern style began immediately and was completed in 1619. During the reconstruction, a miracle occurred, one predicted by Archbishop Carlo Borromeo: one year after his death in 1585, a sick woman was cured in front of the icon of the Madonna del Latte, displayed on the Piazza della Vetra. Following this event, donations increased enabling more rapid progress in the reconstruction. In 1626, the Madonna del Latte was transferred to the high altar where it remains to this day.

In the 1830s the Austrian Government began a redevelopment of the Vetra: houses built leaning against the basilica and inhabited by tanners were demolished; the channel of the Vetra was covered over; and executions were abolished. After the bombings of 1944–1945 the houses that had been destroyed were not rebuilt enabling the park of the basilicas to be created, from which there is an excellent view of the complex. In 1934 in place of the demolished houses a sort of a courtyard was formed, with the creation of a public square opposite the basilica.

== Art and architecture ==
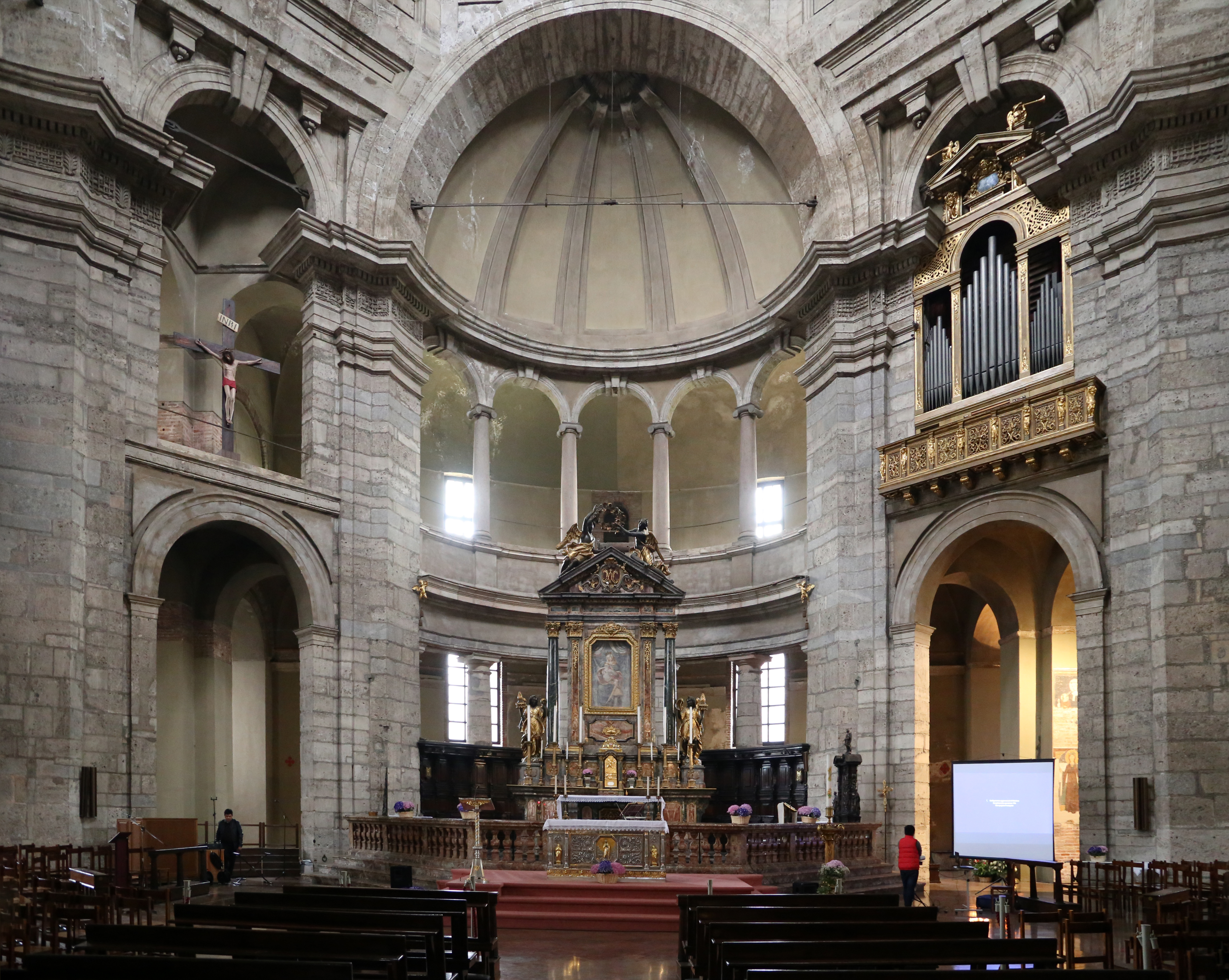
Interior open central area

The basilica, perhaps to avoid the unstable and marshy ground, was built on an artificial hill not far from the walls, along the Via Ticinensis, the main access route to the city, and not far from the Imperial Palace and the amphitheatre, from which were taken some of the materials used in constructing the temple itself. The complex was surrounded by various waterways, coming together to form the Vettabbia, the canal that takes away the waters of Milan, which still flow towards the agricultural areas to the south of the city.

The building had a central plan approached by a four-sided portico and surrounded by two connected structures. Access to the portico was through a colonnade which in turn gave access to three portals leading to the main body of the building. This consisted of a square hall inscribed as a building with four apses, whose semicircular hollows overhung by semi-cupolas were articulated by four columns. Around this space ran the ambulatory surmounted by a space later used as a women's gallery. Towers rose at the four corners of the square building. The whole was topped by a dome of which we know little, this having been lost. The interior was lit by large windows, and probably decorated with marble in the lower parts and with mosaics in the vaults and arches. Of the two side buildings, the smaller was in the east, opposite the entrance: a chapel in the shape of a Greek cross, later on octagonal, dedicated to St Hippolytus. The larger building was to the south, having the function of the imperial mausoleum: tradition attributing its foundation to Galla Placidia, which is why the sacellum took on the name of the chapel of the Queen.

Between 489 and 511 Bishop Lorenzo had a third structure built to the north, a chapel dedicated to St Sixtus, to be used for the burial of metropolitans. Perhaps in this period, when Roman imperial authority in Italy had diminished, the mausoleum to the south of the basilica was transformed into a chapel dedicated to St Genesius the martyr. By the sixth century, on the east wall, opposite the entrance, two portals were opened giving access to two local apses.

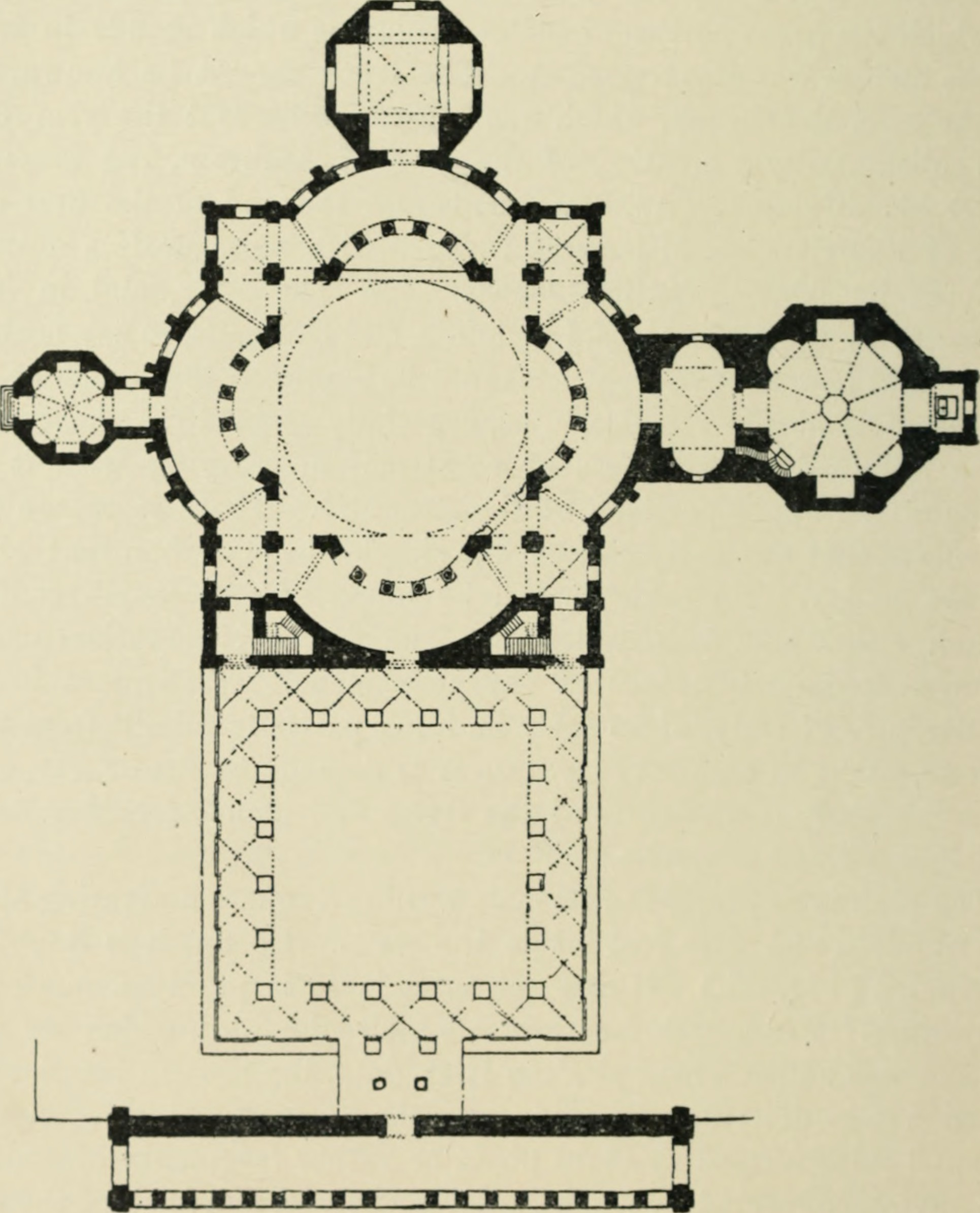
Plan of the church

In the tenth century, probably in the Ottonian era, reconstruction took place possibly involving the participation of a Byzantine workforce who had retained knowledge of the classical techniques of construction and decoration. Little is known regarding these restorations, but it is assumed that the cupola (dome) had been reconstructed using pipes made of terracotta, making it lighter than the previous one, perhaps already damaged to the extent of justifying a reconstruction. After the disasters of the eleventh century, the restorations of the twelfth and thirteenth centuries focused on providing stability to the whole complex, rebuilding the pillars that supported the cupola and carrying out other interventions on the load-bearing structures (columns, towers). In this period, a lantern was added above the dome, supported by flying buttresses leaning against the towers. In the fifteenth century, the Chapel of the Citizens was created from the hall of the apse in the southeast, which had already been refashioned in the eleventh century.

After the collapse of 1573, a new cupola was commissioned from the architect, Martino Bassi. His collaboration with Rinaldi, Meda and Trezzi resulted in numerous changes and was only completed in 1619. Archbishop Borromeo had the chapel of St Genesius rededicated to St Aquilino, whose relics were placed in the chapel; to its sides were added two chapels, dedicated to St John the Baptist and the Holy Family. In 1623, at the wish of Archbishop Federico Borromeo there began the construction of the chapter house to the side of the courtyard, a project carried out by the architects Aurelio Trezzi and Francesco Maria Richino; construction was completed in 1626.

In 1713 at the initiative of Francesco Croce, the Chapel of Redemption was inserted between those of St Aquilino and the Holy Family (now a sacristry).

In 1894, the engineer and architect Cesare Nava built a vestibule in front of the church, consisting of three ionic arches in stone-like cement. In 1934 the houses that had sprung up in the courtyard were demolished, and in their place the following year was positioned a bronze statue of Constantine the Great, a copy of an original late antiquity preserved in Rome in San Giovanni in Laterano; the courtyard was opened to form a public square.

== Pipe organ ==
On the face of the women's gallery to the right of the apse is to be found the pipe organ, built by the Milanese organ builder Pietro Bernasconi, re-using materials from the organ constructed in 1840 by Felice Bossi; he in turn had re-used parts from an earlier organ, restored in 1820 by Antonio Brunelli II and probably originally from the church of San Giovanni in Conca.

The instrument, with a fully mechanical transmission, has its console situated at the centre of the organ case, comprising two manuals (keyboards) each of 61 notes (Great Organ, first manual; Second Organ, second manual), with a first extensive chromatic octave and a pedal board of 24 notes. The case, with its three arched façade, presents a display of 29 pipes of the Principal 8' arranged in three groups, one for each of the three arches, with the mitred mouths of the pipes aligned. Following on, the layout of the organ is arranged according to the position of the mechanisms that control the various stops in the columns of the stops either side of the console (at the left of the console the Second Organ; at the right the Great Organ and Pedal).

== Column to the left of the console – Second Organ ==
Tromba dolce 8' Voce tremula 8' Treble Viola I 4' Bass Violin I 4' Treble Viola II 4' Bass Violin II 4' Treble Voce flebile Treble Flute in VIII 4'

== Column to the left of the registry – Concert ==
Bassoon Bass Trumpet Treble Clarion Bass Clarinet Treble Trumpet Bass English horn Treble Contra Oboe Treble Contra Oboe Bass Flute Treble Viola Bass Flute in VIII Bass Flute in VIII Treble Piccolo Treble Open twelfth Treble Principal cornet Treble Vox humana Treble Violine 8' (on the pedals) Kettledrum (on the pedals) Bombarde 16' (on the pedals)

== Column to the right of the registry – Full ==
Principal 16' Bass Principal 16' Treble Principal I 8' Bass Principal I 8' Treble Principal II 8' Bass Principal II 8' Treble Octave 4' Bass Octave 4' Treble Open twelfth 2 2/3' Bass Open twelfth 2 2/3' Treble Super octave 2' Octave twelfth 1 1/2' Octave fifteenth 1' Mixture I Mixture II Mixture III Bass viols and octave 16'+8' (on the pedals) Bass viols II 16' (on the pedals) Coupler IP Coupler II-I Third hand

== Chapel of Saint Aquilino ==
Other chapels were added to the original edifice. Notable is the octagonal Capella di Sant'Aquilino (chapel of St Aquilino), adjoining the main church to the south. The chapel, which may have originally been built as an imperial Roman mausoleum, features important 4th-century Paleochristian mosaics. Among the mosaics is included a formulaic depiction of Jesus, as "Christ the Lawgiver" ("Traditio Legis" - "handing over the law") or possibly "Christ the teacher". Jesus is seated on a throne, flanked by a "school" of his Apostles, with a scroll box at his feet. The chapel was later dedicated to the martyr Saint Aquilino of Milan (or Saint Aquilinus of Cologne), with his remains being housed in the chapel. A 17th-century reliquary ark for the saint was crafted by Lombardian architect Carlo Garavaglia (fl. 1634–1635). The fresco The Rediscovery of the corpse of Saint Aquilinus of Cologne, by Carlo Urbino, decorates the wall behind the main altar in the Sant'Aquilino chapel.

Chapel of Saint Aquilino
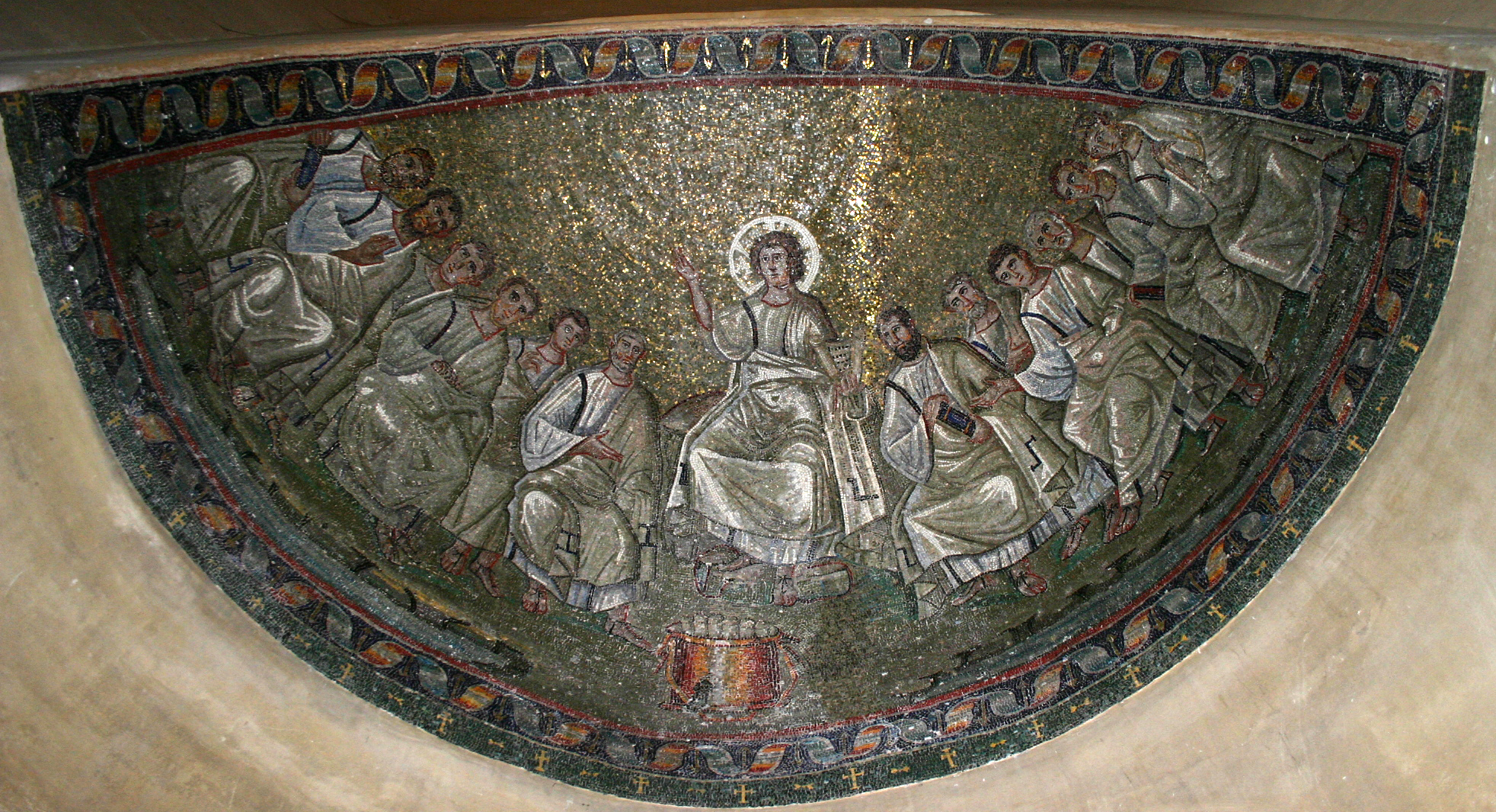
Late 4th-century mosaic of Christ the Lawgiver

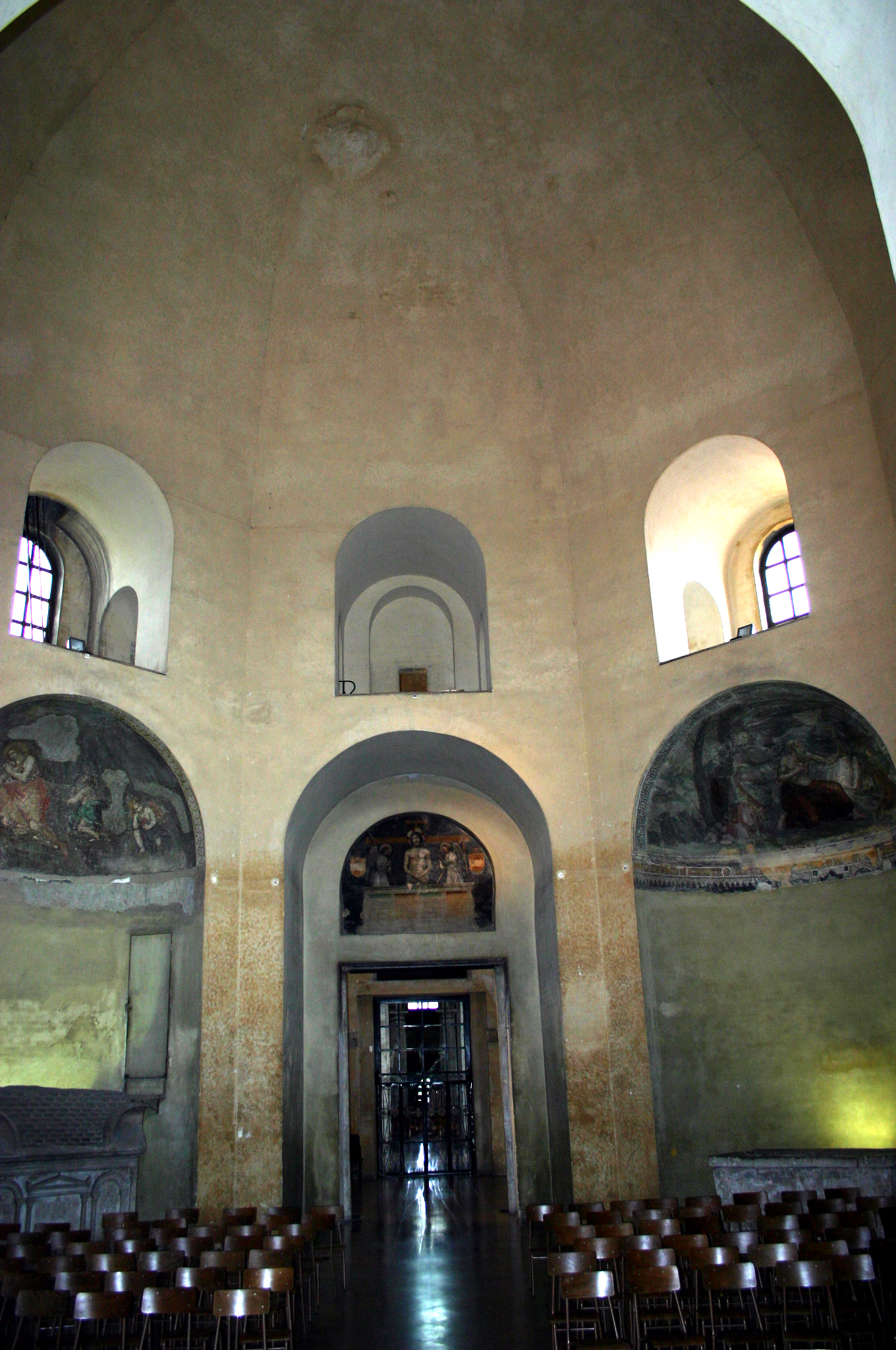
The octagonal chapel

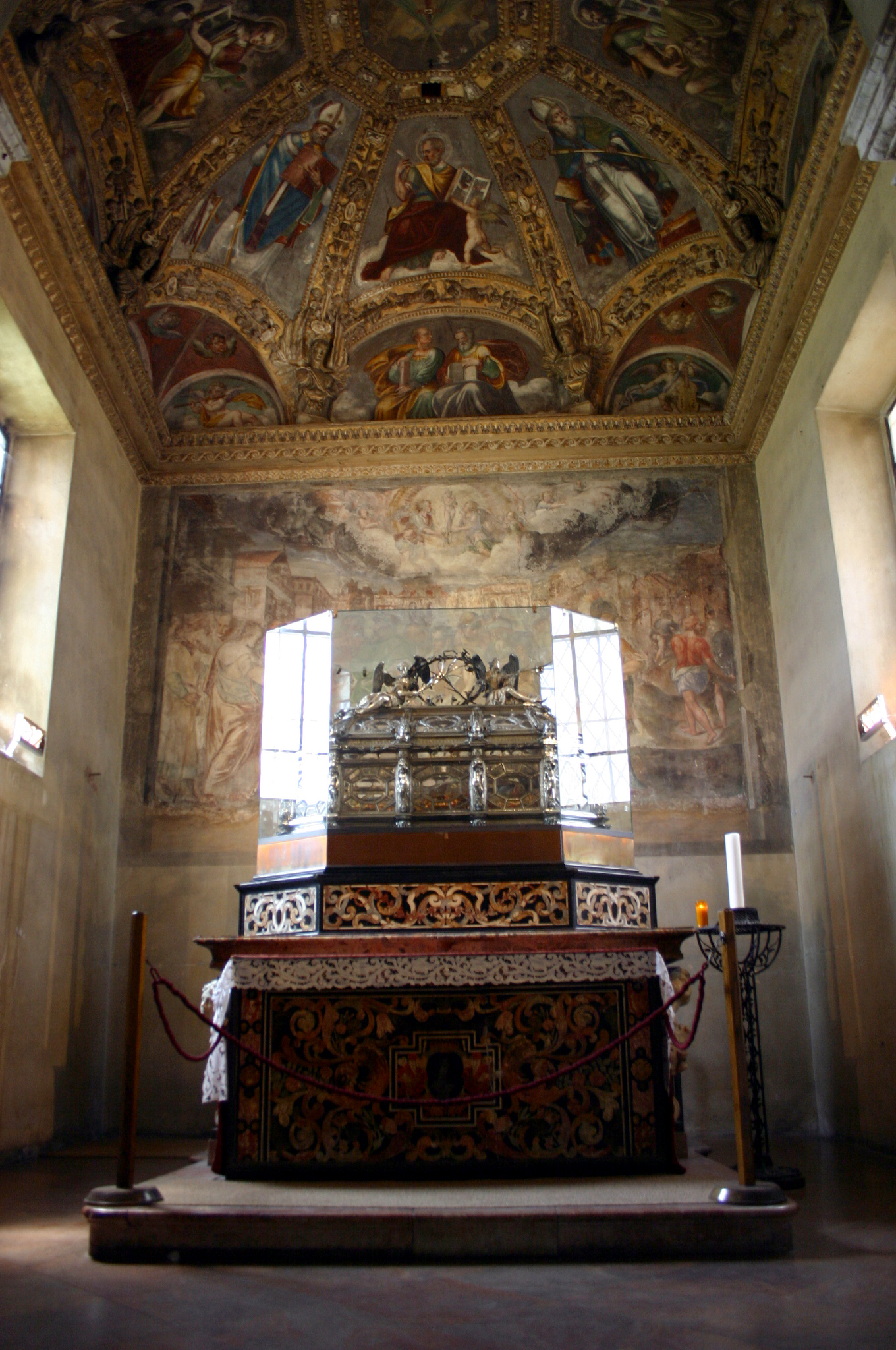
Ceiling over the chapel's main altar

== Colonne di San Lorenzo ==
The square facing the basilica features the so-called "Colonne di San Lorenzo" (Columns of St. Lawrence), one of the few remains of the Roman "Mediolanum", dating from the 3rd century AD and probably belonging to the large baths built by the emperor Maximian. They were carried in the current place when the basilica construction was finished.

== Chronology of the provosts (parish priests) ==
The parish priest of San Lorenzo has long held the position of provost. The complete list of provosts is not known; the following names are derived from a list compiled from studies undertaken by the priest A. Baruffaldi, carved in marble and placed in the basilica itself. Among them were two Archbishops and one Pope.

- Anselmo da Bovisio (?–1097), who was appointed Archbishop of Milan
- ...
- Ambrogio (1116–1119)
- ...
- Belengerio (1137–?)
- ...
- Guifredo (1146–1152)
- ...
- Corvo (1158–1176)
- ...
- Giacomo (1187–1203)
- Anizone (1208–1225)
- Guglielmo (1228–1251)
- Ardizone del Conte (1254–1285)
- Filippo del Conte (1285–1312)
- Bonifacio Pusterla (1313–1314)
- Ardizone del Conte (1321–1338)
- Antonio del Conte (1340–1347)
- Francesco da S. Zenone (1350–1359)
- Francesco da Legnano (1363–1371)
- Giovanni da Mandello (1376–1385)
- Giovanni di Sommariva (1392–1399)
- Martino di Canale (1406–1436)
- Enea Silvvio Piccolomini (1436–1440), in 1458 elected Pope as Pius II
- Leonardo da Vercelli (1441–1444)
- Filippo da Gallarate (1448–1460)
- Nicolò da Appiano (1461–1496)
- Bernardino Lanterio (1500–1505)
- Francesco Cazzaniga (1510–1519)
- Giacomo de Spaldis (1522–1525)
- Francescco Aaccursio (1528–1545)
- Ottoviano Arcimboldo (1546–?)
- Giovan Battista della Chiesa (1551–?)
- Giovan Aandrea Pionnio (1569–1579)
- Giovan Battista Recalcato (1579–1589)
- Giulio Cesare Negri (1589–1594)
- Massimiliano Pusterla (1594–1607)
- Giovan Stefaano Ciami (1607–1608)
- Andrea Bassi (1609–1629)
- Tullo Piantanida (1629–1630)
- Giulio Maschera (1630–1650)
- Giovan Ambrogio Torriani (1650–1666)
- Orazio Baruverio (1667–1688)
- Giovan Antonio Gallo (1688–1717)
- Carlo Ambrogio Curioni (1717–1728)
- Settimio Lodi (1728–1733)
- Pier Antonio Valmaginio (1733–1747)
- Carlo Antonio Belvisi (1748–1770)
- Antonio Airoldo (1771–1795)
- Giovan Battista Aloardi (1795–1819)
- Giovanni dell'Oro (1820–1830)
- Giovan Battista Redaelli (1830–1854)
- Giovan Battista Gadola (1855–1865), formerly Parish priest of Legnano
- Achille Achino (1867–1876)
- Giovan Battista Thomas (1877–1895)
- Luigi Bignami (1896–1905), who was appointed Archbishop of Siracusa
- Carlo Rigogliosi (1906–1932)
- Giovanni Maria Stoppani (1932–1960)
- Anselmo Redaelli (1960–?)
- Carlo del Corno (1968–1984)
- Angelo Manzoni (1984–1986)
- Riccardo Busnelli (1986–1996)
- Augusto Casolo (1996–still in office)

The apse area of the ancient basilica is now a park. Previously the area was occupied by a channel or a lake (probably with a port), while later it was used in public executions, one of which is recounted in Alessandro Manzoni's Storia della Colonna Infame.

== See also ==
- Roman architecture
- List of Roman domes
- Ancient Roman and Byzantine domes
- High medieval domes
- 17th-century Western domes
- Early Christian churches in Milan

== Sources ==
- Beckwith, John (1979) [1970]. "Early Christian Art: Rome and the Legacy of the Caesars". Early Christian and Byzantine Art. The Pelican History of Art (2nd ed.). Harmondsworth: Penguin Books. pp. 31. ISBN 0-14-056033-5.
- A. Calderini; G. Chierici & C.Cecchelli (1951). La basilica di S. Lorenzo Maggiore in Milano (in Italian). Milan: Fondazione Treccani Degli Alfieri Per La Storia Di Milano.
- de Capitani d'Arzago, A. (1942). Architettura dei secoli quarto e quinto in Alta Italia (in Italian). Milan: Unknown.
- de Capitani d'Arzago, A. (1948). Actes du VIe Congrès International des Études Byzantines. Vol. II. Paris: Unknown. p. 80.
- Krautheimer, Richard (1965). "Christian Architecture in the Capitals 335-400". Early Christian and Byzantine Architecture. The Pelican History of Art. Baltimore: Penguin Books. pp. 55–57.
- Staddon, Jackie & Weston, Hilary (2005). Milan's 25 Best. Fodor's CITYPACK. New York: Fodor's Travel Publications. p. 35. ISBN 1-4000-1516-2.
- Sutton, Ian (1999). "The Christian Legacy of Rome". Western Architecture: From Ancient Greece to the Present. World of Art. London: Thames and Hudson. pp. 24. ISBN 0-500-20316-4.
- Verzone, Paolo (1942). L'architettura religiosa dell'alto medio evo nell'Italia settentrionale (in Italian). Milan: Officine Grafiche Esperia.
- Ward Perkins, J. B. (1947). "The Italian Element in Late Roman and Medieval Architecture". Annual Italian Lecture of the British Academy.
- Weitzmann, Kurt, ed., Age of spirituality: late antique and early Christian art, third to seventh century, no. 584, 1979, Metropolitan Museum of Art, New York, ISBN 9780870991790
