= Santa Tecla, Milan =

Former Christian church in Milan, Italy (350–1458)

Coordinates: 45°27′50″N 09°11′29″E

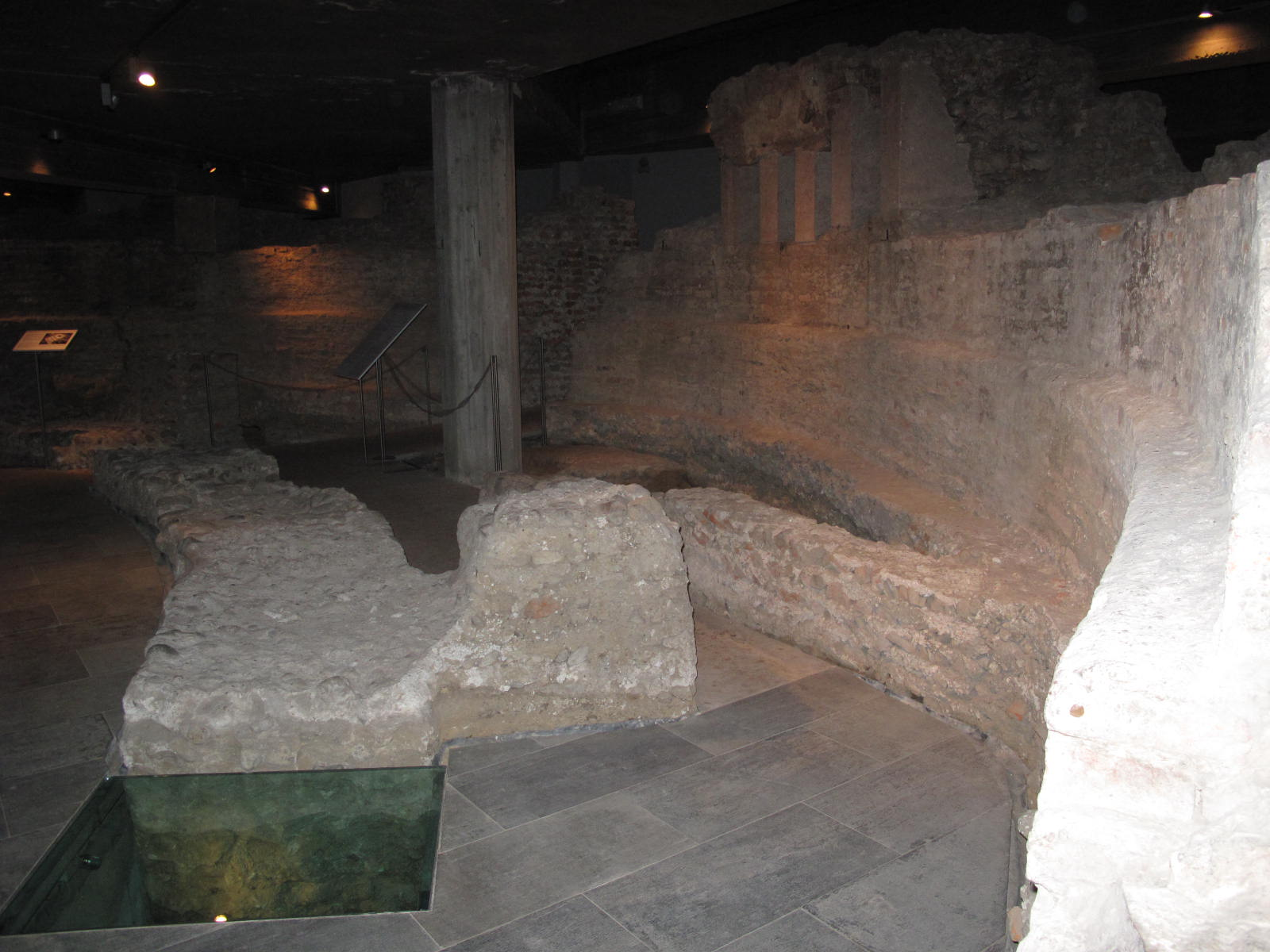
The ruins of the apse

Basilica di Santa Tecla was a former, paleo-Christian basilica church in Milan, region of Lombardy, Italy. It was originally established in 350 and demolished in 1458. Remnants of the structure have been excavated underneath the Milan Cathedral.

According to a number of historians the construction of the Basilica was ordered by Roman Emperor Constans in 345 under the name Basilica Maior. It was then founded in 350.

== See also ==
- Early Christian churches in Milan
