= Municipalities of Milan =

The nine boroughs of Milan

Milan is divided into nine municipalities (Italian: municipi or zone; known as zone di decentramento, "decentralization zones" from 1999 until 2016). They are numbered from 1 to 9. The organization was established in 1997, implemented in 1999 and reformed in 2016; prior to that the city was divided into 20 administrative zones.

== History ==
Since early 1960s in Milan operated many spontaneous citizens' committees in different areas of the city. In 1968 the City Council divided for the first time the territory of the comune into 20 administrative areas, called zone (singular: zona) for administrative purposes and to increase decentralization. Each zona had a directly-elected council with a merely consultative role.

In 1977 the City Council increased the role of zones' councils, providing them decision-making powers and transforming them into real administrative bodies, equipped with their own staffs and offices. Those new councils were elected for the first time on 8 June 1980.

On 13 March 1997 the City Council reformed again the "decentralization zones", planning to give each borough council several functions. On 19 January 1999 the city executive chaired by the Mayor Gabriele Albertini decided to merge some of the zones, reducing their number to 9 and giving them a new numeration. This proposal was ultimately approved by the City Council on 3 March 1999.

== Borough Councils ==
Each Municipality has a local government called Consiglio di Municipio (Borough Council). Every Council is composed of a President and 40 members for boroughs exceeding 100,000 inhabitants or 30 members for smaller ones.

While the 1997 plan was intended to ascribe several rights and functions to borough councils, this has been largely unattended, so that borough councils have, in practice, little power and few duties. Some of the actual functions of borough councils are:

- expressing opinions on urbanistic and social issues such as public works, town planning, maintenance of green spaces, regulamentation of street markets. These opinions are not binding for the higher level city government.
- managing funds (if any) provided by the city government for specific purposes, such as those intended to guarantee the right to education for poorer families.

After the 2016 administrative reform, the Borough Councils are also responsible for most local services, such as schools, social services, waste collection, roads, parks, libraries and local commerce. Moreover, the Presidents are no longer elected by the Councils members but directly by the voters; for the current legislature (2021–26) the Presidents are:

Municipality	President	Party	Votes	%	Mayoral majority
1	Mattia Abdu	PD	23,017	62.5	check
2	Simone Locatelli	PD	26,427	55.7	check
3	Caterina Antola	PD	32,477	58.2	check
4	Stefano Bianco	Ind (Note: Elected at the head of the centre-left alliance.)	30,262	54.9	check
5	Natale Carapellese	PD	22,938	54.7	check
6	Santo Minniti	PD	30,311	58.5	check
7	Silvia Fossati	Ind (Note: Elected at the head of the centre-left alliance.)	31,747	53.5	check
8	Giulia Pelucchi	PD	36,140	57.0	check
9	Anita Pirovano	Ind (Note: Elected at the head of the centre-left alliance.)	31,661	53.8	check

== The nine boroughs ==
With the exception of Municipio 1, which corresponds to the historical city centre (defined as the part of the city that used to be surrounded by the old Spanish walls, now mostly demolished), the boroughs are organized in a sunburst pattern, and numbered from the north-east zone clockwise (see picture above). While boroughs are mostly referred to by number, each borough also has an official name, usually a list of its main districts or areas.

Current boroughs are described in the table below, along with their names, area and population (as of 1 January 2024), as well as a list of the main districts comprising each zone. Note that districts (quartieri) are informal (they are not administrative divisions).

Municipality	Map	Name	Logo	Area (km^{2})	Population (2024)	Population density (inhabitants/km^{2})	Quartieri (districts)
1		Centro storico		9.67	99,317	11,074	Brera, Centro Storico, Conca del Naviglio, Guastalla, Porta Sempione, Porta Tenaglia
2		Stazione Centrale, Gorla, Turro, Greco, Crescenzago		12.58	163,731	13,031	Adriano, Crescenzago, Gorla, Greco, Loreto, Maggiolina, Mandello, Mirabello, Ponte Seveso, Porta Nuova, Precotto, Stazione Centrale, Turro, Villaggio dei Giornalisti
3		Città Studi, Lambrate, Porta Venezia		14.23	145,345	10,785	Casoretto, Cimiano, Città Studi, Dosso, Lambrate, Ortica, Porta Monforte, Porta Venezia, Quartiere Feltre, Rottole
4		Porta Vittoria, Forlanini		20.95	165,393	8,069	Acquabella, Calvairate, Castagnedo, Cavriano, Forlanini, Gamboloita, La Trecca, Monluè, Morsenchio, Nosedo, Omero, Ponte Lambro, Porta Vittoria, Porta Romana, Rogoredo, San Luigi, Santa Giulia, Taliedo, Triulzo Superiore
5		Vigentino, Chiaravalle, Gratosoglio		29.87	126,837	4,487	Basmetto, Cantalupa, Case Nuove, Chiaravalle, Chiesa Rossa, Conca Fallata, Fatima, Gratosoglio, Le Terrazze, Macconago, Missaglia, Morivione, Porta Lodovica, Porta Vigentina, Quintosole, Ronchetto delle Rane, San Gottardo, Selvanesco, Stadera, Torretta, Vaiano Valle, Vigentino
6		Barona, Lorenteggio		18.28	152,942	8,998	Arzaga, Barona, Boffalora, Cascina Bianca, Conchetta, Creta, Foppette, Giambellino-Lorenteggio, Lodovico il Moro, Moncucco, Porta Genova, Porta Ticinese, Ronchetto sul Naviglio, San Cristoforo, Sant'Ambrogio, Teramo, Villa Magentino, Villaggio dei Fiori
7		Baggio, De Angeli, San Siro		31.34	176,814	6,093	Assiano, Baggio, Figino, Fopponino, Forze Armate, Harar, La Maddalena, Muggiano, Porta Magenta, Quartiere degli Olmi, Quarto Cagnino, Quinto Romano, San Siro, Valsesia, Vercellese
8		Fiera, Gallaratese, Quarto Oggiaro		23.72	196,562	8,326	Boldinasco, Bullona, Cagnola, Campo dei Fiori, Cascina Triulza, Chinatown, Comina, Fiera, Gallaratese, Garegnano, Ghisolfa, Lampugnano, Musocco, Porta Volta, Portello, Quarto Oggiaro, QT8, Roserio, San Leonardo, Trenno, Varesina, Vialba, Villapizzone
9		Porta Garibaldi, Niguarda		21.12	190,656	9,204	Affori, Bicocca, Bovisa, Bovisasca, Bruzzano, Ca' Granda, Centro Direzionale, Comasina, Dergano, Fulvio Testi, Isola, La Fontana, Montalbino, Niguarda, Porta Garibaldi, Porta Nuova, Prato Centenaro, Segnano
				181.76	1,386,285	8,164	
