= District of Milan =

The District of Milan was one of the four divisions of the Department of Olona, the province of Milan during the Napoleonic Italian Republic. It received the numeral I and its capital was Milan. Founded on May 13, 1801, it had a population of 217,807 inhabitants.

== Communes ==
It was composed by the communes of Milan, Holy Bodies of Milan

- Affori
- Arcagnano
- Arese
- Assago
- Assiano
- Baggio
- Balbiano
- Balsamo
- Baranzate
- Bazzana Sant'Ilario
- Bazzanella
- Bescapè
- Bicocca e Bicocchino
- Binzago
- Boldinasco
- Bolgiano
- Bollate
- Bovisio
- Bresso
- Briavacca
- Brusuglio
- Bruzzano
- Buccinasco
- Bustighera
- Cannobio
- Carpianello
- Carpiano
- Casiglio
- Cassignanica
- Cassina Aliprandi
- Cassina Amata
- Cassina de' Gatti
- Cassina del Donato
- Cassina del Pero
- Cassina nuova
- Cassina Nuova
- Cassina Pertusella
- Cassina Savina
- Cassina Triulza
- Cassino Scanasio
- Castel Lambro
- Castellazzo d'Arconate
- Cavajone
- Cerchiate
- Cerro al Lambro
- Cesano Boscone
- Cesano Maderno
- Cesate
- Chiaravalle
- Cinisello
- Civesio
- Cologno Monzese
- Colturano
- Cormano
- Cornaredo
- Cornegliano
- Corsico
- Crescenzago
- Cusago
- Cusano Milanino
- Dergano e Derganino
- Desio
- Dugnano
- Fagnano
- Figino
- Fizzonasco
- Foramagno
- Garbagnate Milanese
- Garegnano Marcido
- Gorla
- Grancino
- Gudo Gambaredo
- Incirano
- Lambrate
- Lampugnano
- Limbiate
- Limito
- Linate superiore ed inferiore
- Liscate
- Locate
- Loirano
- Lorenteggio
- Lucino
- Macconago
- Maccherio
- Mangialuppo
- Masciago
- Mazzo
- Mediglia
- Melegnano
- Mercugnano
- Mezzano
- Mezzate
- Monte
- Monzoro
- Morsenchio
- Muggiano
- Muggiò
- Musocco
- Niguarda
- Nosedo
- Nova
- Novate Milanese
- Novegro
- Opera
- Paderno Dugnano
- Pairana
- Palazzuolo
- Pantanedo
- Pantigliate
- Pedriano
- Peschiera Borromeo
- Pieve Emanuele
- Pinzano
- Pioltello
- Pizzabrasa
- Poasco
- Ponte Sesto
- Precentenaro
- Precotto
- Premenugo
- Quarto Cagnino
- Quinto de' Stampi
- Quinto Romano
- Quinto Sole
- Rancate
- Redecesio
- Riozzo
- Robbiano
- Rodano
- Romanobanco
- Romano Paltano
- Ronchetto presso Corsico
- Roserio
- Rovagnasco
- Rovido
- Rozzano
- San Donato Milanese
- San Giuliano Milanese
- San Gregorio vecchio
- San Pedrino
- San Vito
- San Zeno
- Sant'Alessandro
- Santa Brera; Segnano e Segnanino
- Greco e Pasquè di Seveso; Segrate
- Seguro
- Sella Nuova
- Senago
- Sesto San Giovanni
- Sesto Ulteriano
- Settala
- Settimo Milanese
- Seveso
- Solaro
- Terrazzano
- Terzago
- Tolcinasco
- Torrevecchia Pia
- Torriggio
- Tregarezzo
- Trenno
- Trenzanesio
- Trezzano
- Triuggio
- Trognano
- Trucazzano
- Turago Bordone
- Turro
- Vajano
- Valera
- Varedo
- Vialba
- Viboldone
- Videserto
- Vigentino
- Vighignolo
- Vigliano
- Vignate
- Vigonzone
- Villa Pizzone
- Villa Rossa
- Villa San Fiorano
- Villarzino
- Vimodrone
- Vizzolo
- Zelo
- Zivido
- Zunico

== Sources ==
- Historical database of Lombard laws (it.)
