= Figino =

Figino may refer to:

- Figino (district of Milan), a quarter in the Italian city of Milan.
- Figino, Switzerland, a settlement in the Barbengo quarter of the Swiss city of Lugano.
- Giovanni Ambrogio Figino (1548/1551 – 1608), Italian Renaissance painter from Milan.
- Figino Serenza, comune in the Province of Como in the Italian region Lombardy
