= Muggiano (district of Milan) =

Coordinates: 45°27′02″N 9°04′11″E

- Quartier of Milan
- Interactive map of Muggiano
- Country: Italy
- Region: Lombardy
- Province: Milan
- Comune: Milan
- Zone: 7
- Time zone: UTC+1 (CET)
  - Summer (DST): UTC+2 (CEST)

Muggiano (Lombard: Muggian [myˈdʒãː]) is a district (quartiere) of Milan, Italy, part of the Zone 7 administrative division of the city. It is located in western periphery, bordering on the comunes of Cesano Boscone, Cusago, Settimo Milanese, and Trezzano sul Naviglio. Before being annexed to Baggio (in 1869), which in turn was annexed to Milan, Muggiano used to be an autonomous comune.

The name Muggiano is of Roman origin; the place used to be called Modianus, after the governor of its territory, named Modius.

Until the 1990s, Muggiano was mostly a scarcely populated, rural district, with a landscape dominated by cascine (farmhouses) and cultivated land. After that, a residential area has been created and the population has rapidly grown. It is primarily a working class neighborhood. There is a Catholic parish, Parrocchie di S. Marcellina e Madonna della Fede in the neighborhood, which consists of two church buildings, the older Baroque Chiesa di S. Marcellina and the Modernist Chiesa Di Madonna della Fede.

Muggiano is about 10 km from the centre of Milan. As a consequence, it mostly depends on the nearby urban centres of Cesano Boscone and Baggio.

== Landmarks ==
The main landmarks of Muggiano are two well preserved, medieval cascine (Cascina Guascona and Cascina Guasconcina) and the notable church of Saint Marcellina.

== Transportation ==
Muggiano is connected by bus 63 (approximately 15 minutes ride) to the Bisceglie stop of the Milan Metro.

The Tangenziale ring road has an exit to Muggiano.
