= Quarto Cagnino =

Coordinates: 45°28′23″N 9°06′34″E

Quarto Cagnino Quart (Lombard)
- Quartier of Milan
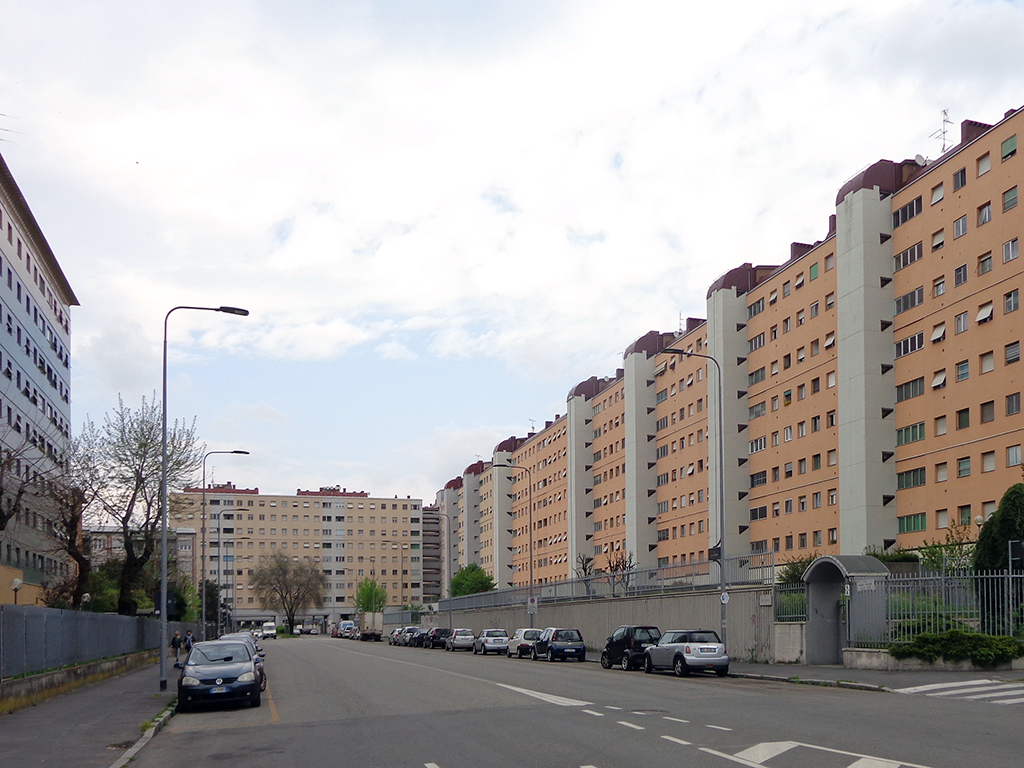
- Quarto Cagnino district
- Interactive map of Quarto Cagnino
- Country: Italy
- Region: Lombardy
- Province: Milan
- Comune: Milan
- Zone: 7
- Time zone: UTC+1 (CET)
  - Summer (DST): UTC+2 (CEST)

Quarto Cagnino (Italian pronunciation: [ˈkwarto kaɲˈɲiːno]; Milanese: Quart [ˈkwɑːrt]) is a district (quartiere) of Milan, Italy, part of the Zone 7 administrative division of the city. It borders the districts of Trenno (north), San Siro (east), Baggio (south), and Quinto Romano (west). Before being annexed to Milan, in 1869, it was an autonomous comune and, briefly, a part of Trenno (from 1861 to 1869).

Quarto Cagnino is a formerly rural, now urban district, with the last period of quick urban development having occurred in the late 1960s in so called "GESCAL" projects. The "GESCAL" acronym stands for "Gestione Case per i Lavoratori", i.e., "Housing for Workers"; these projects were meant to realize vast low-income apartment blocks in rationally organized, "satellite" city neighbourhoods. Example of GESCAL apartment flats are found along Via Carlo Marx, close to the San Carlo hospital. While low-income, huge apartment buildings dominate the landscape of Quarto, these contrast with some remaining ancient cascine, testifying the rural past of the district. These are mostly found along Via Fratelli Zoia, which used to be the main street of old rural Quarto Cagnino.

The district is connected to Milan by several bus lines. The district has one of the major hospitals in Milan, the San Carlo, and part of two large city parks, Parco delle Cave and Parco di Trenno.

== History ==
The origins of "Quarto Cagnino" date back at least to Roman times, as the very toponymy proves (the name "quarto", i.e., "fourt", being a reference to Quarto being four Roman miles from Milan). In the Middle Ages, a rural borgo developed, which had an important role in the Milanese country as it was crossed by both a pilgrimage route to the Holy Land and the road towards Santiago de Compostela. In the 18th and 19th, a number of cascine (farms) were established nearby the borgo. Prominent crops in the area included mulberries, vine, and fodder.

In 1846, the population of Quarto was 298, and its territory 182 hectares. In 1861, Quarto Cagnino as well as two nearby comunes (Figino and Quinto Romano) were annexed to Trenno (which was renamed "Trenno e Uniti") which in turn became part of Milan in 1869.
