= Zone 7 =

Zone 7 may refer to:

- London fare zone 7, of the Transport for London zonal system
- Hardiness zone, a geographically defined zone in which a specific category of plant life is capable of growing
- Zone 7 of Milan
