= San Siro (district) =

Coordinates: 45°28′28″N 9°08′25″E

San Siro San Sir
- Quartier of Milan
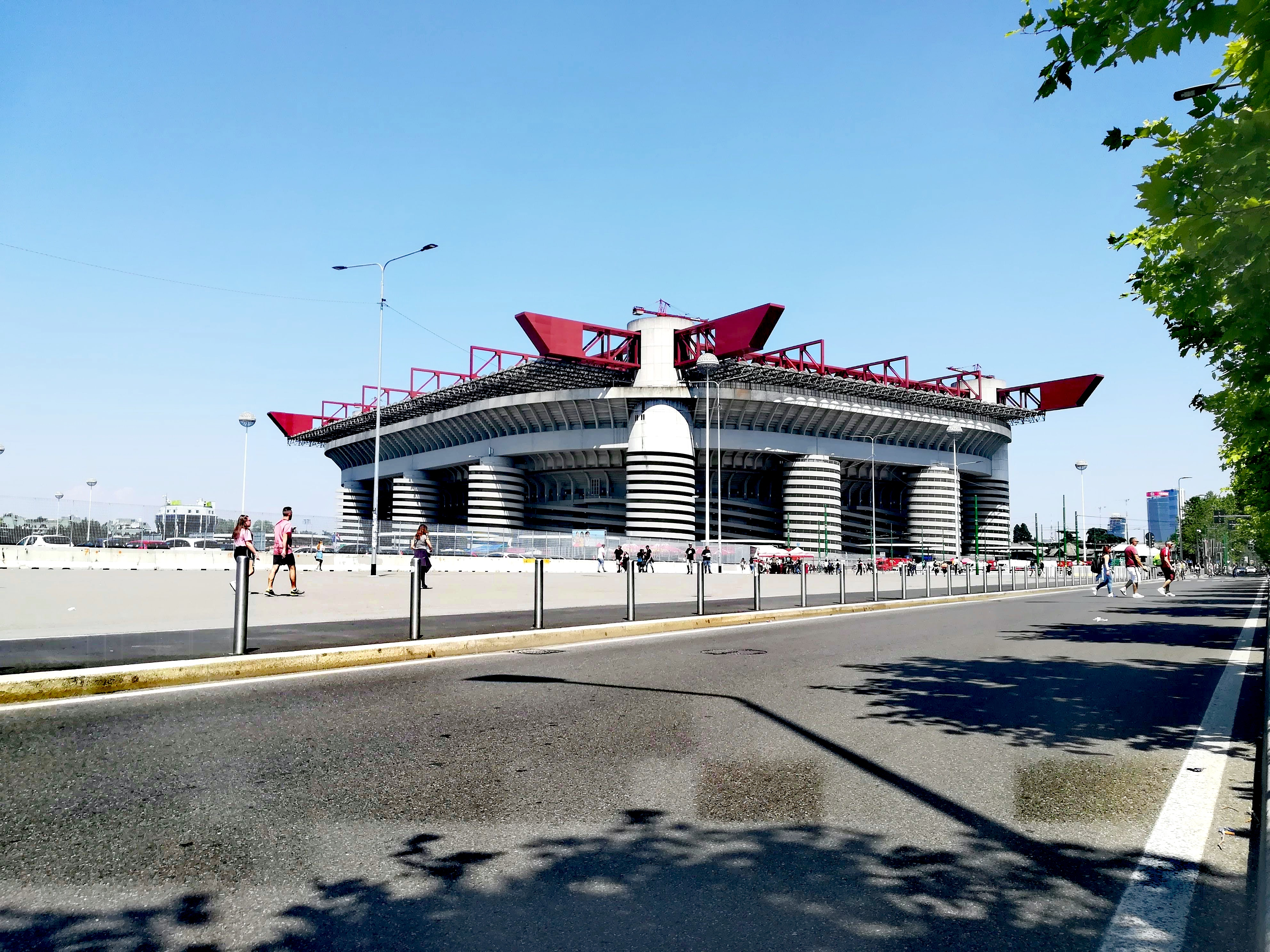
- View of the Giuseppe Meazza "San Siro" stadium from Via Harar.

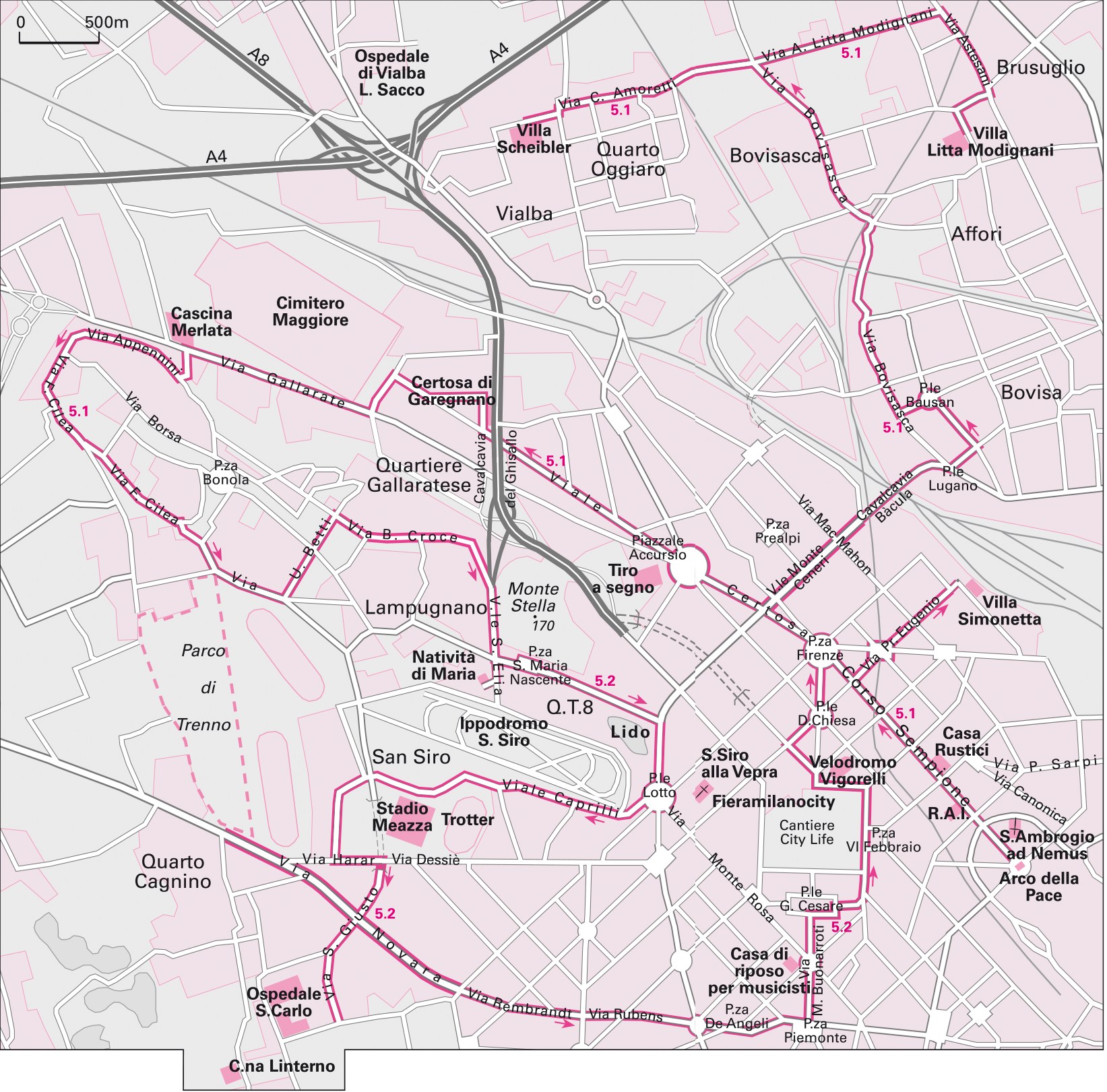
- Map of the districts of Milan. Sempione and San Siro.
- Country: Italy
- Region: Lombardy
- Metropolitan City: Milan
- Comune: Milan
- Zone: 7
- Time zone: UTC+1 (CET)
  - Summer (DST): UTC+2 (CEST)

San Siro (Lombard: San Sir) is a vast district ("quartiere") of Milan, Italy, part of the Zone 7 administrative division of the city. About 5 km north-west of the city centre, it borders the districts of Lampugnano, QT8, FieraMilano, and Trenno.

== History ==
Until the 19th century, San Siro was a small settlement, on the banks of the Olona river; its centre was in the surroundings of what is now Piazzale Lotto. The area has been radically transformed in the 20th century.

San Siro is a very diverse district, with wide green areas and cemented neighbourhoods, low-income and high-income housing, villas and apartment blocks. Most of the buildings in the area date back to the mid 20th century.

The district is also characterized by prominent sports structures, most notably the Giuseppe Meazza football stadium, home of AC Milan and FC Internazionale Milano. It also houses the most important Milanese hippodrome, as well as other horse racing-related structures. The Palasport di San Siro arena, mainly used for basketball and volleyball games, was also in this district; it was closed in 1985 when its roof collapsed after a large snowfall.

The district is named after (probably) Syrus of Pavia (Siro di Pavia) the first bishop of Pavia.
