= Zone 7 of Milan =

Coordinates: 45.461244°N 9.089917°E

Zona 7 di Milano Municipality 7
- Municipality of Milan
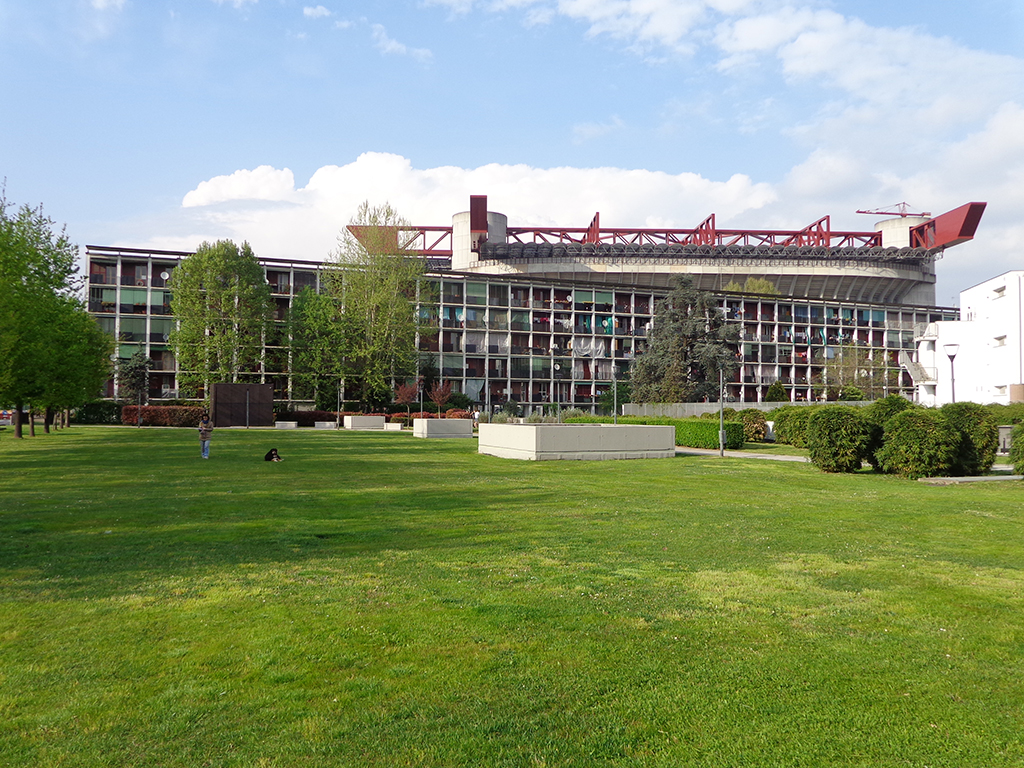
- Harar district

- Location of Zone 7 of Milan
- Country: Italy
- Region: Lombardy
- Province: Metro City of Milan
- Comune: Milan

Government
  - President: Silvia Fossati (Ind)

Area
  - Total: 12.10 sq mi (31.34 km^{2})

Population (2022)
  - Total: 173,791
- Time zone: UTC+1 (CET)
  - Summer (DST): UTC+2 (CEST)
- Website: Municipality 7

The Zone 7 of Milan, since 2016 officially Municipality 7 of Milan, (in Italian: Zona 7 di Milano, Municipio 7 di Milano) is one of the 9 administrative divisions of Milan, Italy.

It was officially created as an administrative subdivision during the 1980s. On 14 April 2016, in order to promote a reform on the municipal administrative decentralization, the City Council of Milan established the new Municipality 7, a new administrative body responsible for running most local services, such as schools, social services, waste collection, roads, parks, libraries and local commerce.

== Subdivision ==
The borough includes the following districts:

- Assiano, a rural district quite isolated from the urban area. It was autonomous comune until 1841;
- Baggio, autonomous comune until 1923. It retains rural areas and traditional cascine (farmhouses) in its outskirts. In the late 20th century, Baggio had the reputation of being a degraded area with high crime rates, something that is reflected in local idioms such as "non andare a Baggio se non hai coraggio" ("don't go to Baggio if you're not brave"). The situation has changed over time, especially as a consequence of the development and renewal of the Parco delle Cave city park, which has since become a popular leisure area;
- Figino, a rural settlement reported at least since the Middle Ages; it is reported as a comune in a 1257 document. it was annexed to Milan in 1869;
- Harar, a public housing district realized between 1951 and 1955;
- La Maddalena;
- Muggiano, mostly a scarcely populated, rural district, with a landscape dominated by farmhouses and cultivated land;
- Porta Magenta, which is named after one of the gates of Milan. The gate was established in the 9th century, with the Roman walls of the city; it was moved with the medieval and Spanish walls, and was finally demolished in the 19th century;
- Quartiere degli Olmi, a public housing district realized during the 1960s;
- Quarto Cagnino, a formerly rural, now urban district, with the last period of quick urban development having occurred in the late 1960s in so called "GESCAL" projects. The "GESCAL" acronym stands for "Gestione Case per I Lavoratori" ("Housing for Workers"); these projects were meant to realize vast low-income apartment blocks in rationally organized, "satellite" city neighbourhoods;
- Quinto Romano, a former rural district, urbanized during the 1960s;
- San Siro, a very diverse district, with wide green areas and cemented neighbourhoods, low-income and high-income housing, villas and apartment blocks. The district is also characterized by prominent sports structures, most notably the Giuseppe Meazza football stadium, home of A.C. Milan and Inter Milan. It also houses the most important Milanese hippodrome, as well as other horse racing-related structures;
- Valsesia;
- Vercellese.

== Municipal government ==
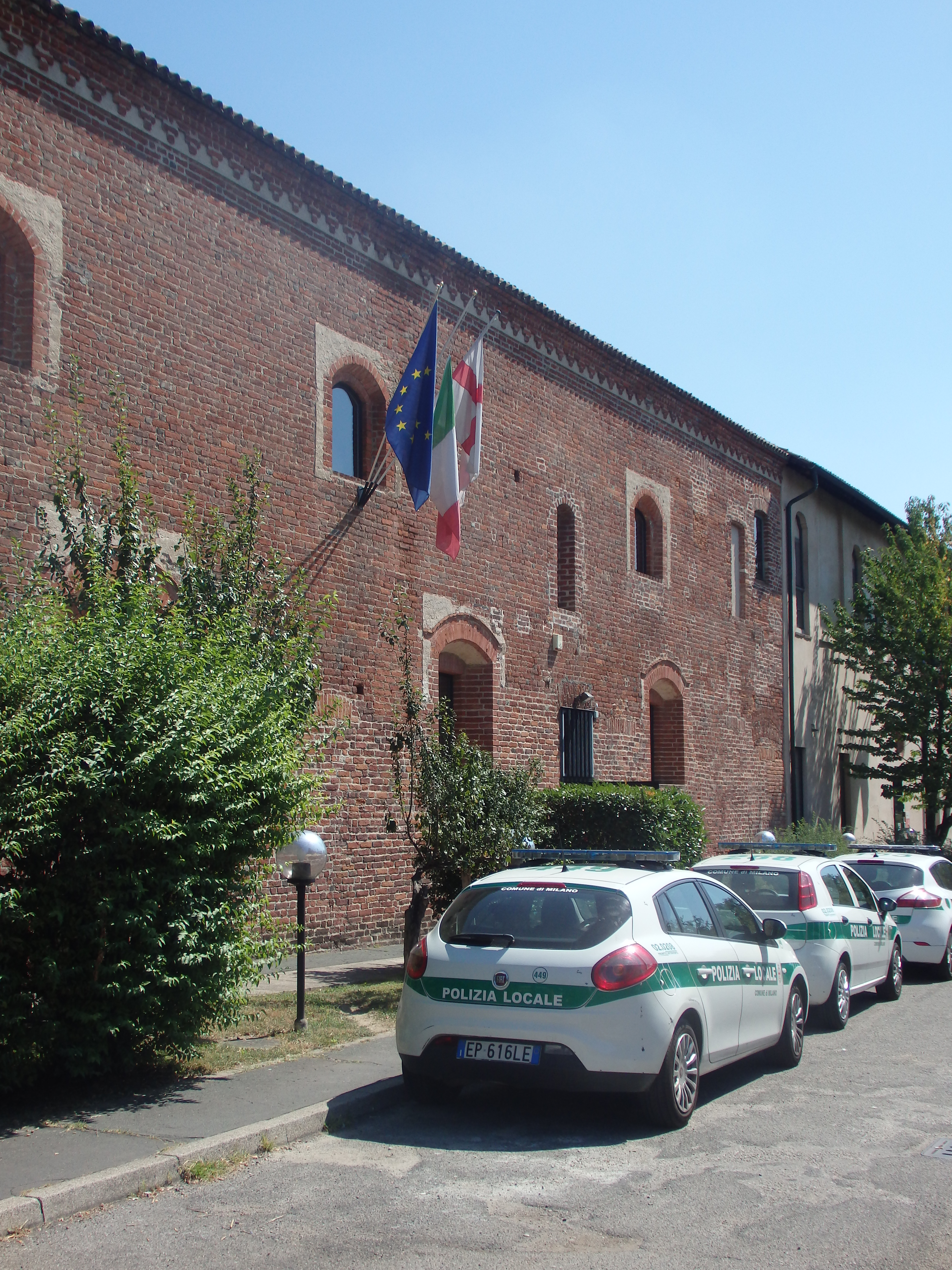
The seat of the Municipal Council.

The area has its own local authority called Consiglio di Municipio (Municipal Council), composed by the President and 30 members directly elected by citizens every five years. The Council is responsible for most local services, such as schools, social services, waste collection, roads, parks, libraries and local commerce in the area, and manages funds (if any) provided by the city government for specific purposes, such as those intended to guarantee the right to education for poorer families.

The current President is Silvia Fossati (Ind), elected on 3–4 October 2021.

Here is the current composition of the Municipal Council after 2021 municipal election:

Alliance or political party	Members		Composition
Alliance or political party	2021–2026		Composition
Centre-left (PD-EV)	18	18 / 30	
Centre-right (FI-L-FdI)	11	11 / 30	
M5S	1	1 / 30	

Here is a full lists of the directly elected Presidents of Municipio since 2011:

President	Term of office		Party
Fabrizio Tellini	16 May 2011	27 June 2016	IdV
Marco Bestetti	27 June 2016	8 October 2021	FI
Silvia Fossati	8 October 2021	Incumebent	Ind

== Parks and gardens ==
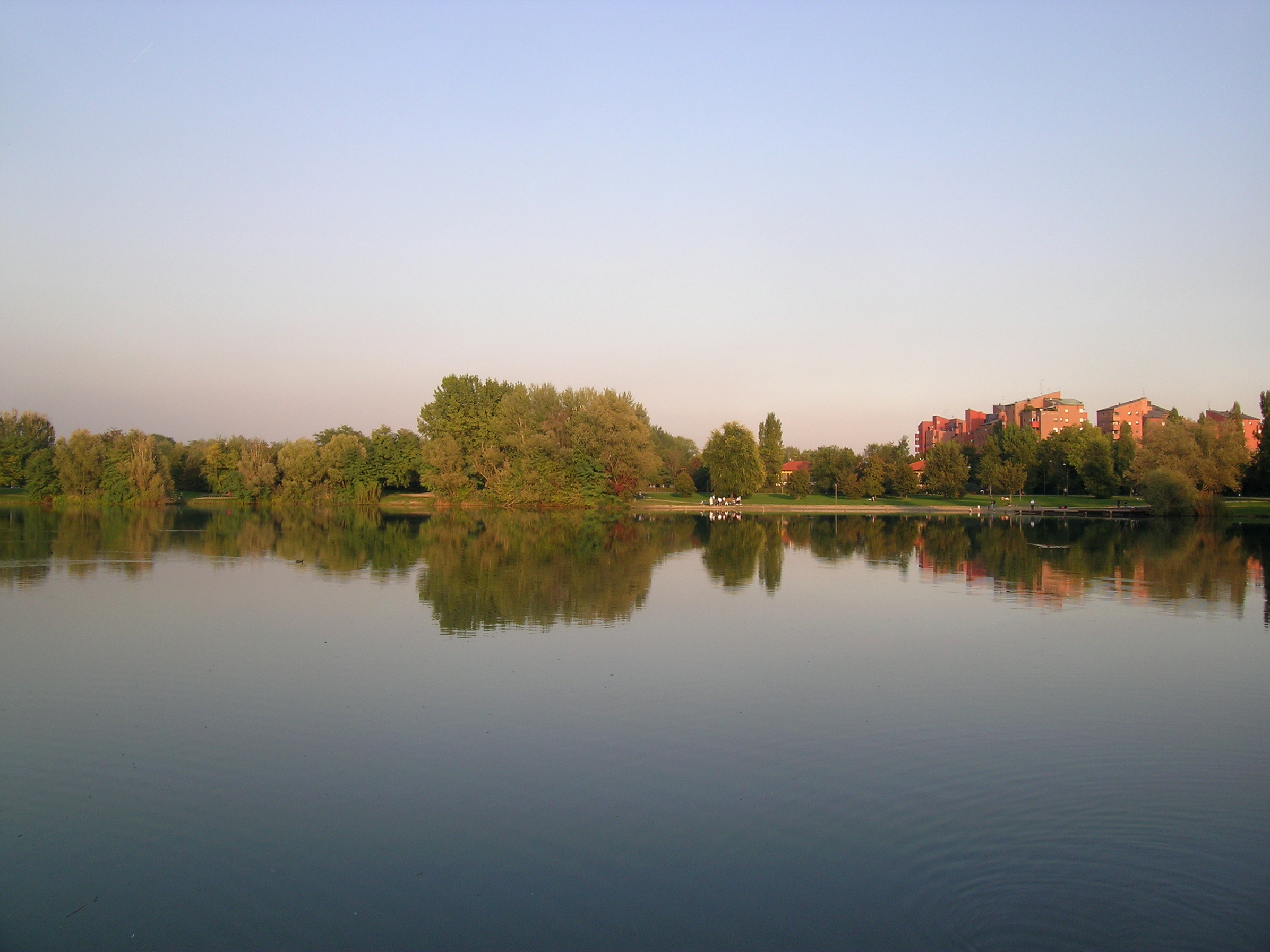
Parco delle Cave is one of the biggest public parks in Milan.

In this borough there are many public parks and gardens:

- Parco delle Cave (135 ha), opened in 2002;
- Boscoincittà (110 ha), opened in 1974;
- Trenno park (50 ha), opened in 1971;
- Baggio park (3 ha), opened in 1964;
- Valsesia park (7 ha), opened in 1990;
- Annarumma park (6 ha), opened in 2000.

== Transport ==
Stations of Milan Metro in the Zone 7:

- Buonarroti, De Angeli, Gambara, Conciliazione, Pagano, Wagner;
- San Siro Ippodromo, San Siro Stadio, Segesta.

== Gallery ==
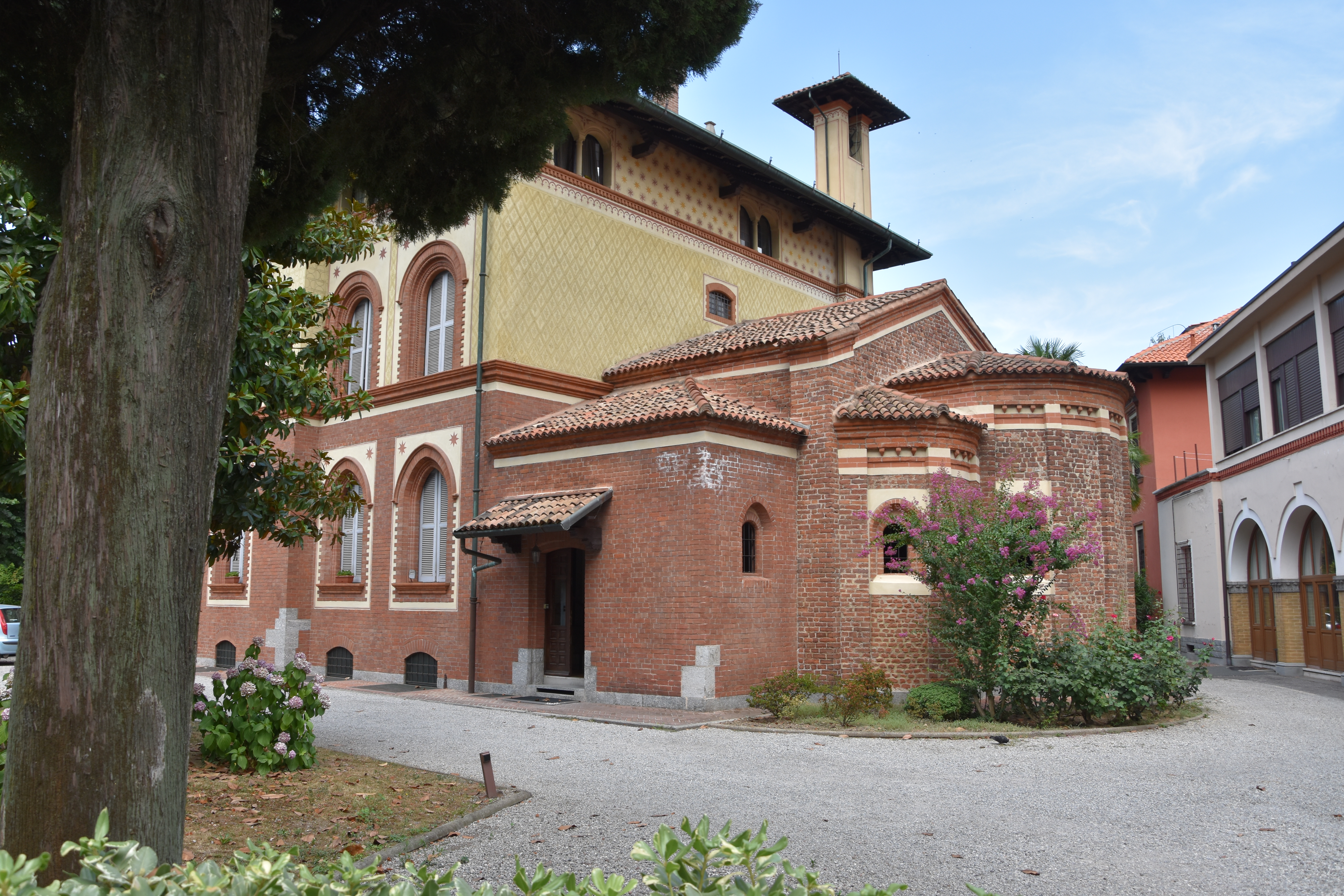
San Siro church, built in the 9th century

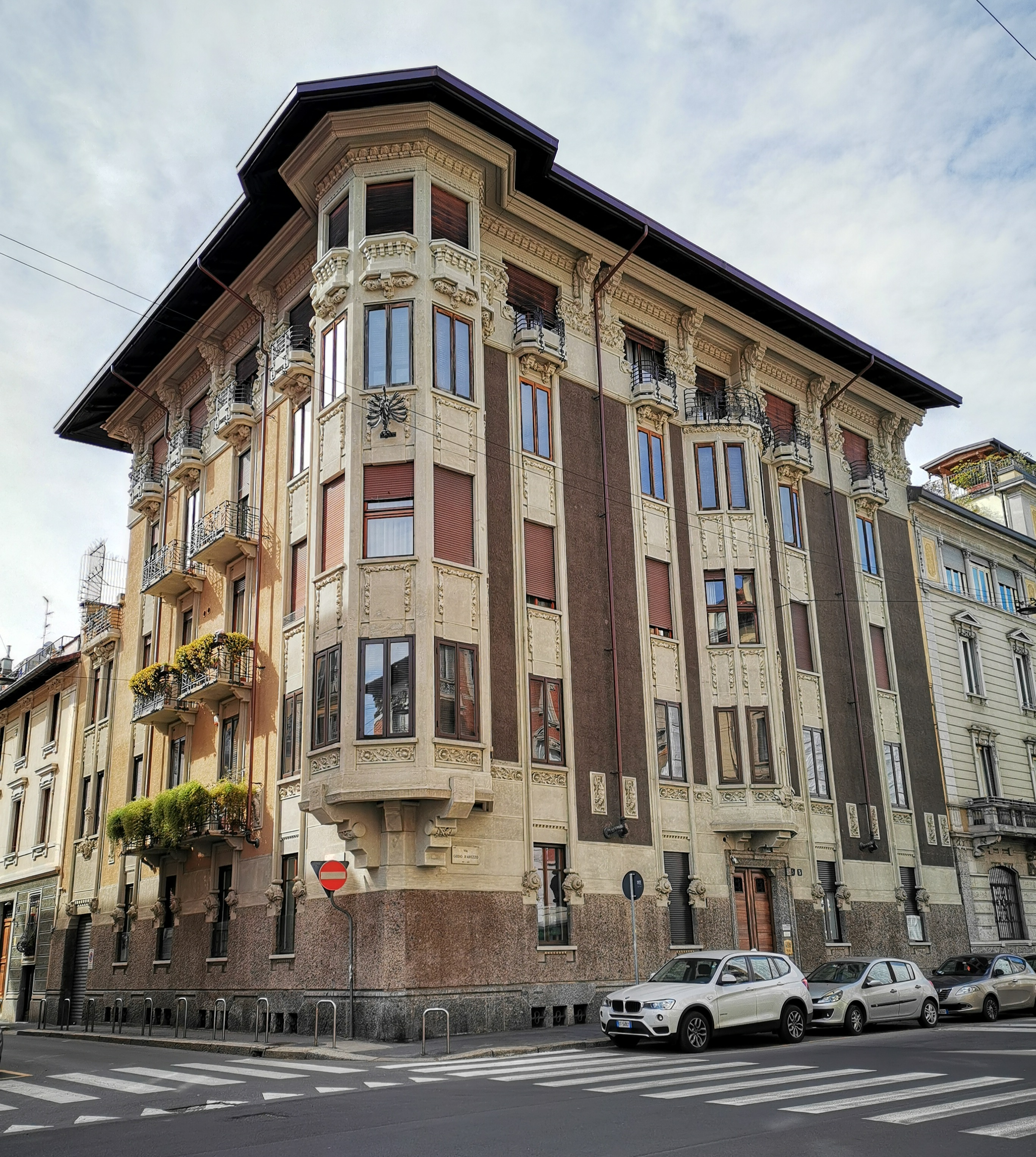
Art Deco Casa Frisia (1922)

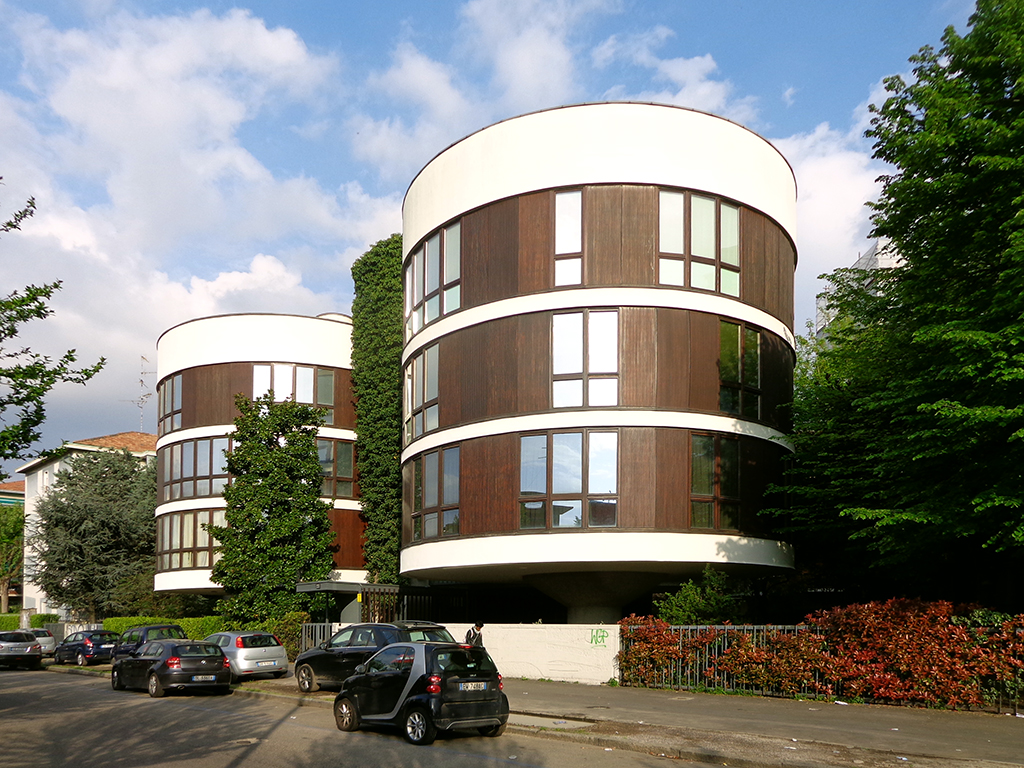
Three Cylinder house by Angelo Mangiarotti (1962)

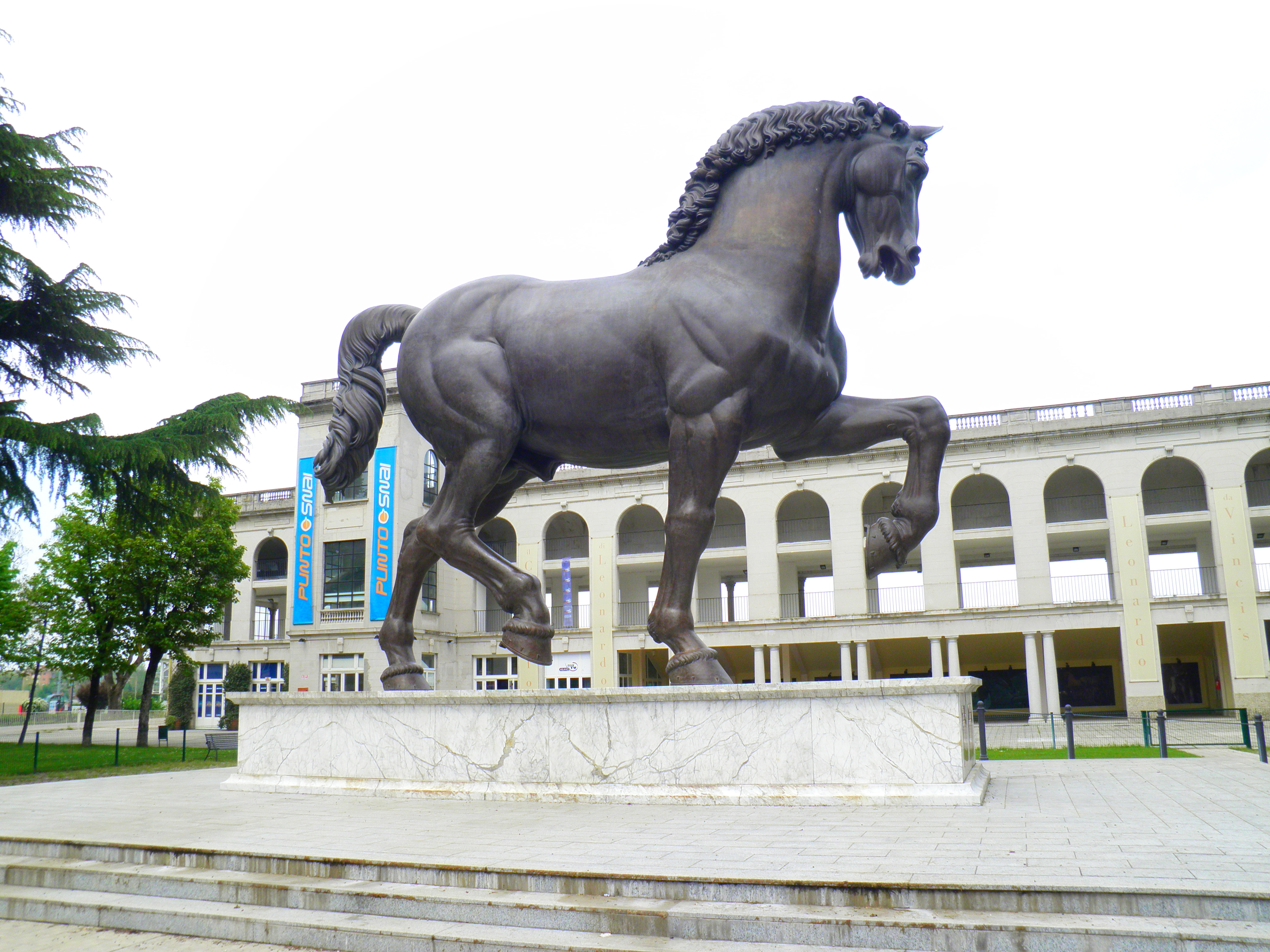
Hippodrome of San Siro

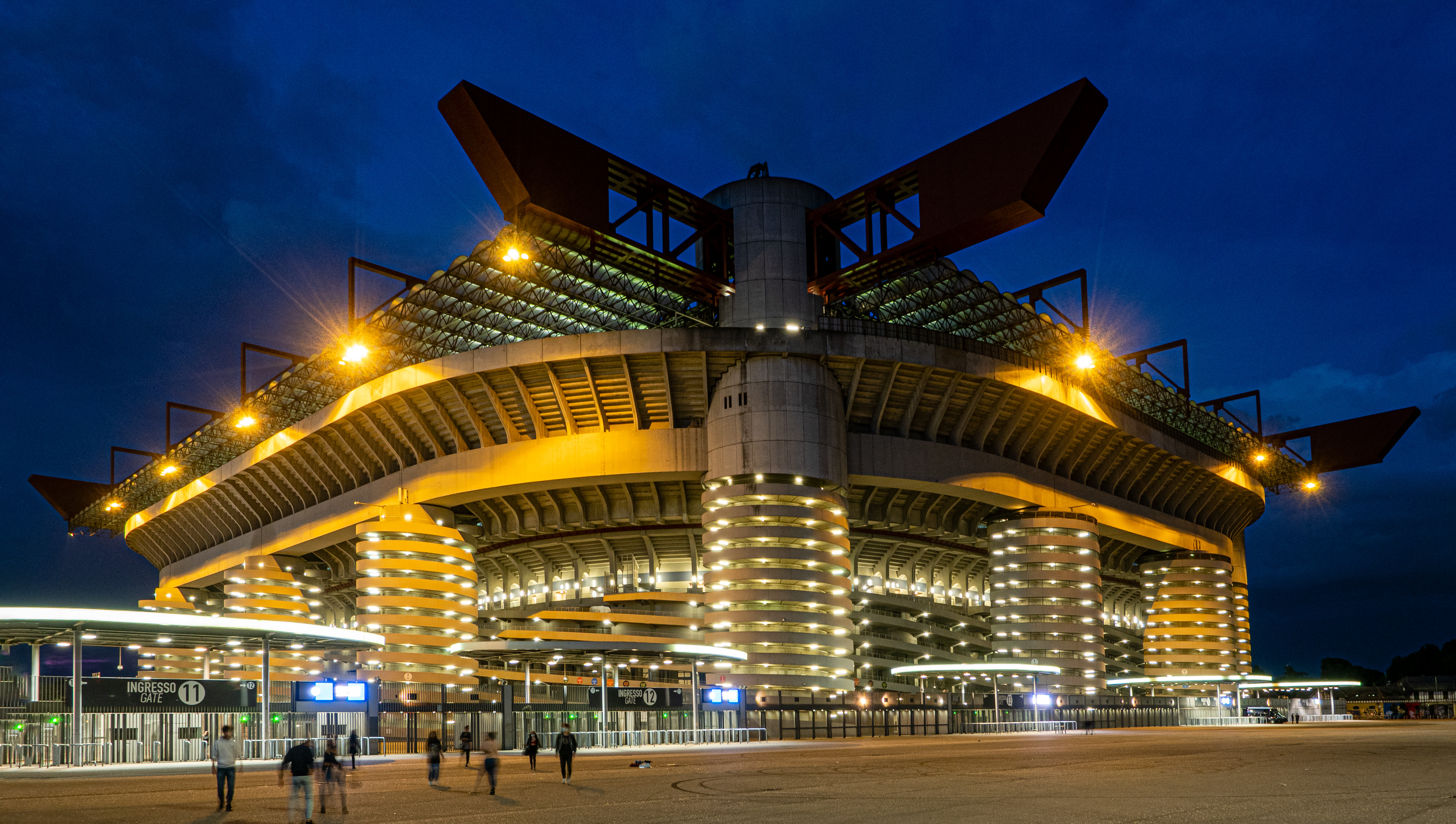
San Siro Stadium
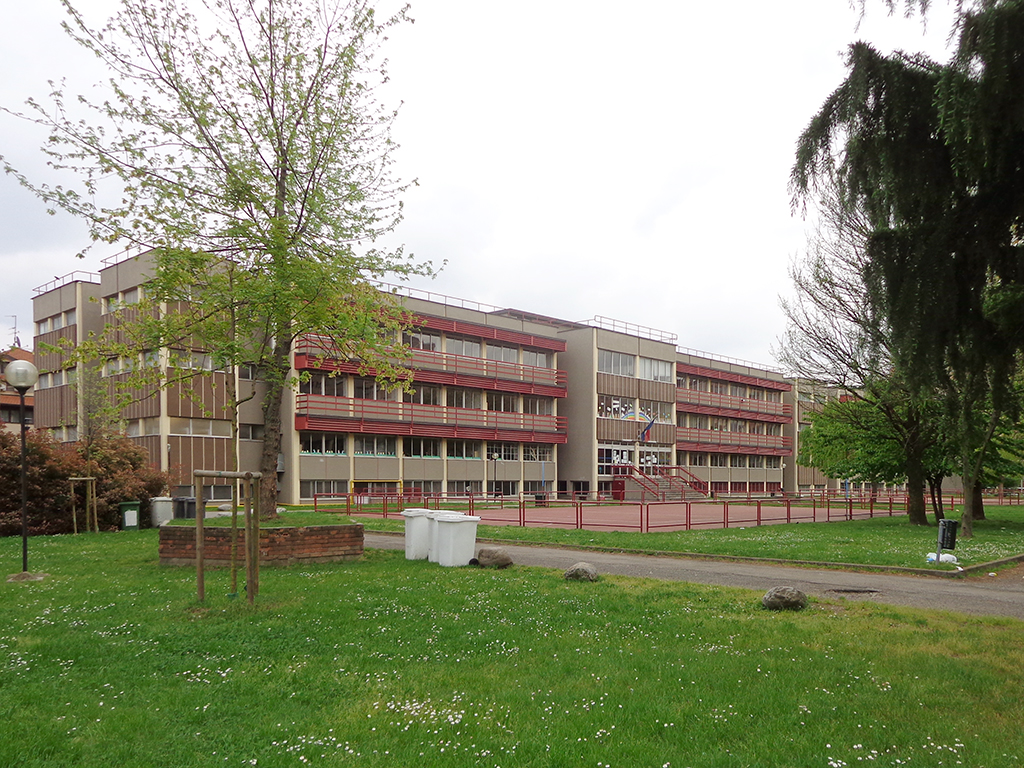
Public primary school in Quarto Cagnino

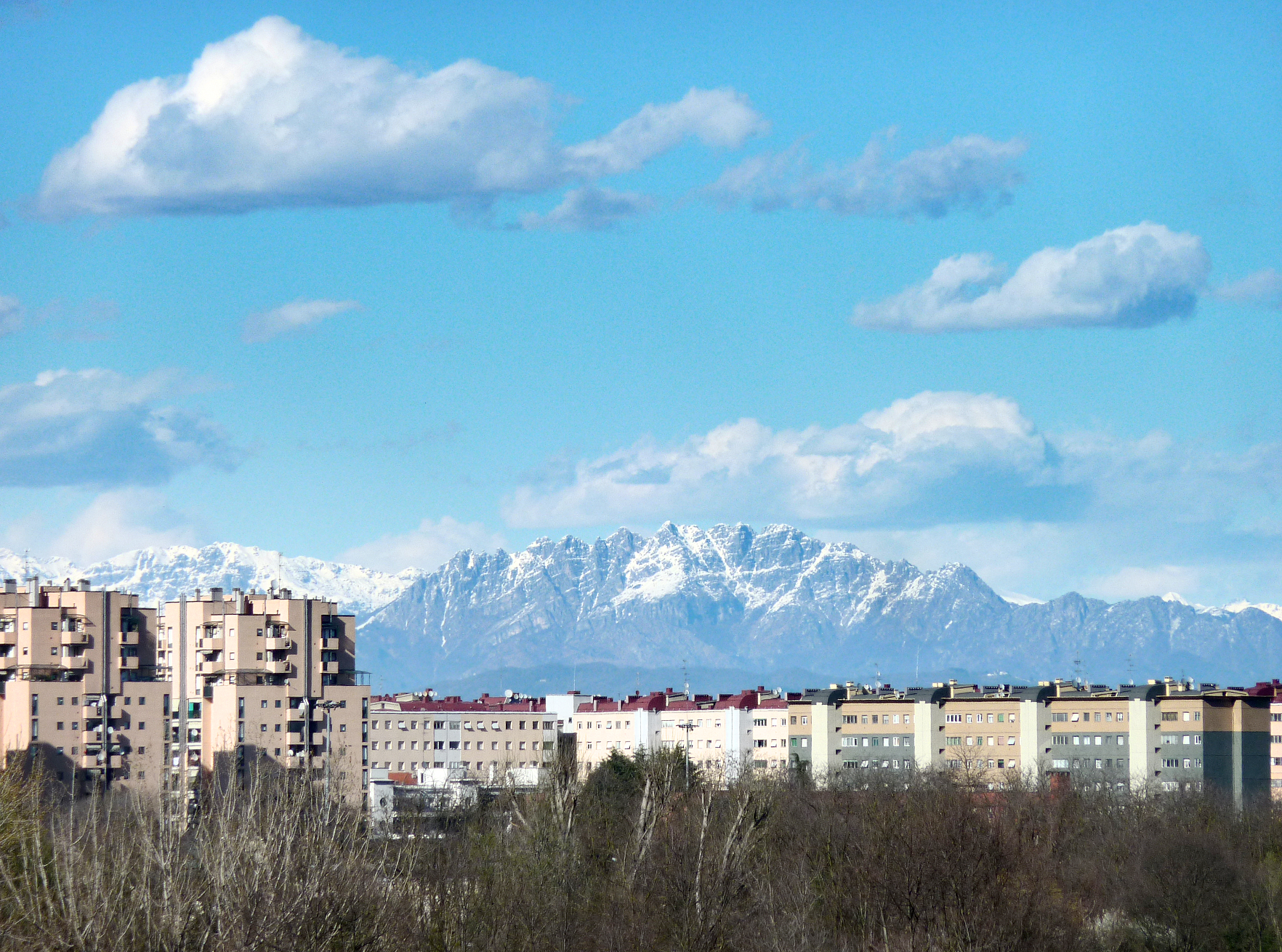
The Alps seen from Baggio

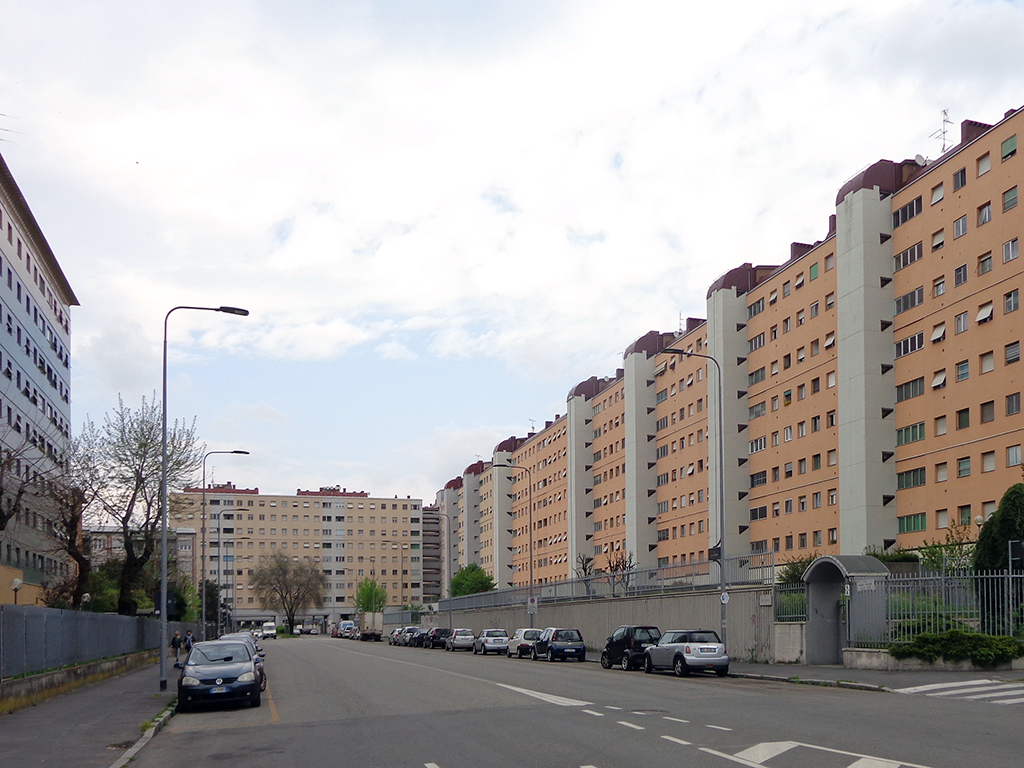
Social residences in Quarto Cagnino

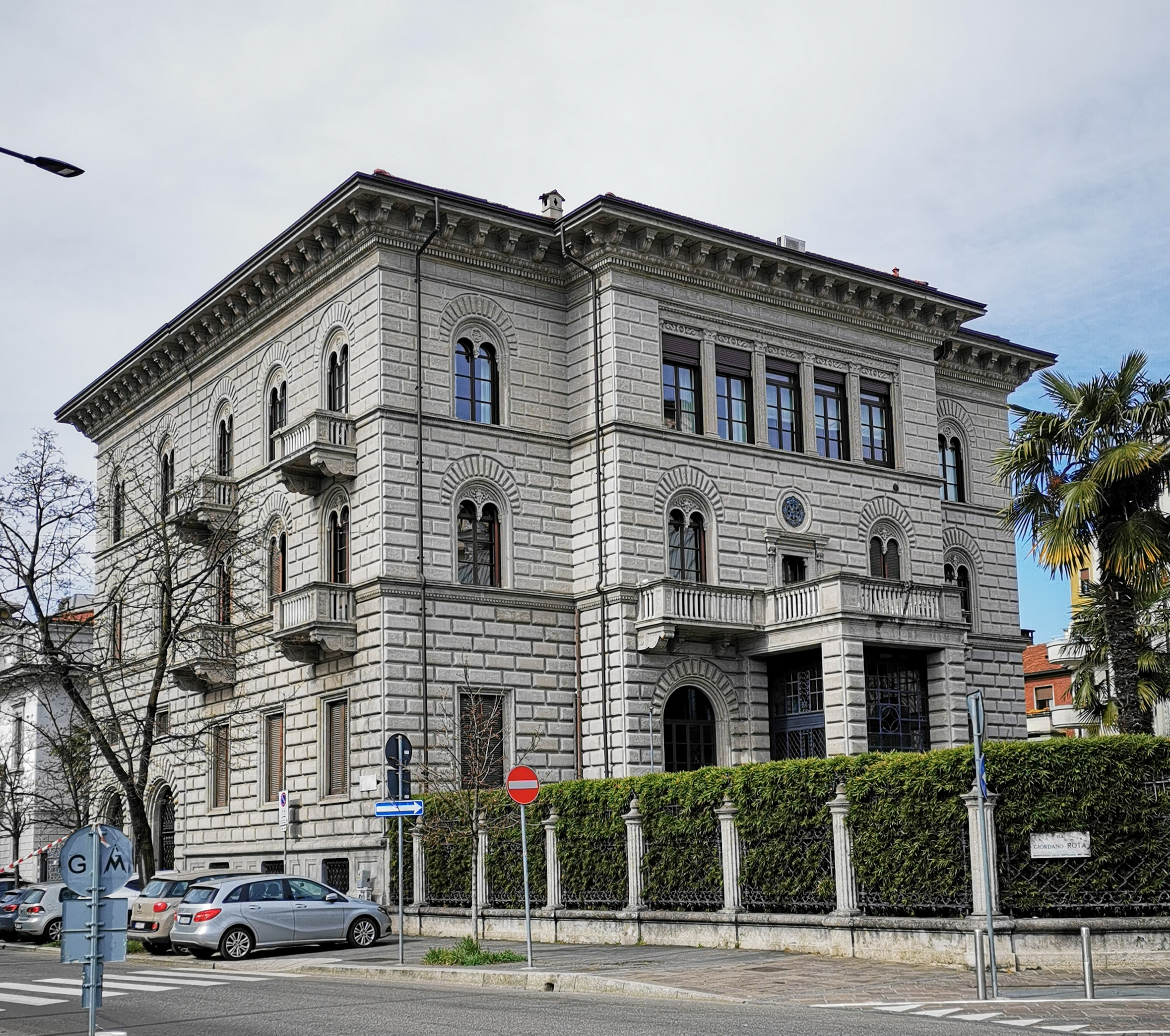
Romanesque Revival house

== Maps ==
Map of Milan Zone 7
