= Baggio Cemetery =

Cemetery in Milan

Coordinates: 45.4641637°N 9.0825667°E

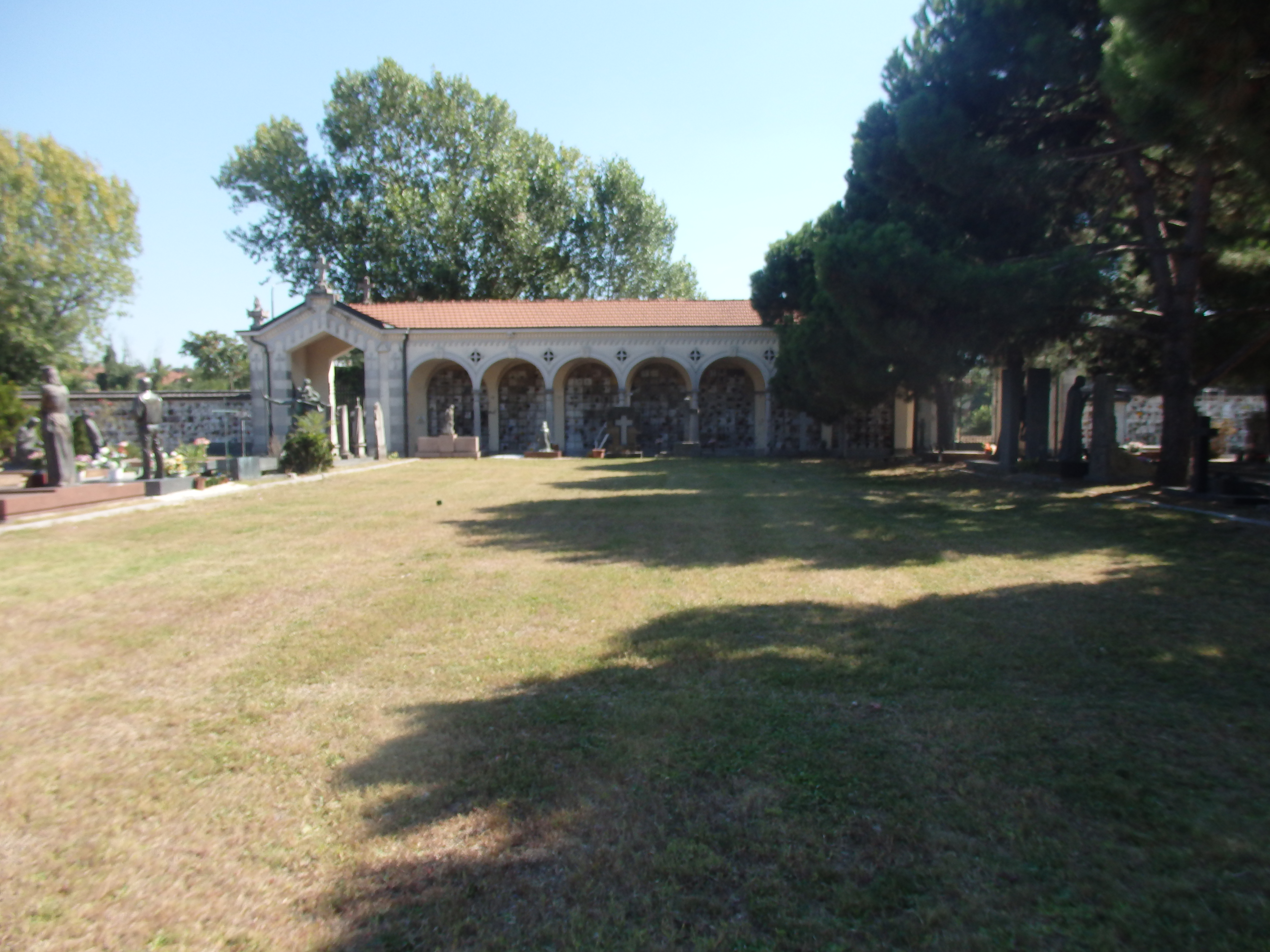
The Cemetery

The Baggio Cemetery (Italian: Cimitero di Baggio, Lombard: Cimiteri de Bagg) is a cemetery which serve the zone of Baggio, a borough which used to be an autonomous city until 1923. It has a section for non Catholic people, one for fallen in the WWI and a Church. Since 2006 it has the first Italian funeral home which can be used to non Catholic funerals or to help the death's relatives.
