= Assiano =

Coordinates: 45°27′15″N 9°03′31″E

- Quartiere of Milan
- Interactive map of Assiano
- Country: Italy
- Region: Lombardy
- Province: Milan
- Comune: Milan
- Zone: 7
- Time zone: UTC+1 (CET)
  - Summer (DST): UTC+2 (CEST)

Assiano is a rural district ("quartiere") of Milan, Italy, part of the Zone 7 administrative division. It is a border district, at the western end of the city area. Before being annexed to Milan (in 1841), it was an autonomous comune, except for a brief period (1808-1816) when it was included in Cusago.

Although administratively part of Milan, Assiano is quite isolated from the urban area and has maintained its rural character. A distinctive feature of Assiano and nearby rural areas is the presence of several ancient "fontanili", i.e., artificial water springs.

The most important historic building in Assiano is the eponymous cascina (farmhouse), i.e., Cascina Assiano. In the past, the cascina has been the property of several notable Milanese families, including the Agnelli, the Feltrinelli, and the Migliavacca. Until the early 20th century, Cascina Assiano was the main driving force of the economy of the area, on which a number of other activities depended. For example, the local dairy factory "Gambini" was established to process milk produced in Cascina Assiano. Today, Cascina Assiano is publicly owned and abandoned (while the Gambini dairy factory has survived).

== History ==
A rural settlement in the area of Assiano has probably existed since Roman times; an ancient Roman plaque with the inscription "AXILIANVM" is exhibited in the Sforza Castle museum, and was reportedly found in "the area of Baggio" (which might actually mean in Assiano, as these two districts have been merged in the past). A place called "Axiliano" is also mentioned in legal documents of the mid-11th century.

The first specific reference to the "comune of Assiano" is found in administrative documents dating back to the 14th century, where it is referred to as a part of the pieve of Cesano Boscone, named "Asliano". It remained part of the pieve through the 16th, 17th, and 18th century. Under Napoleonic rule, Assiano was annexed to Cusago, but regained its autonomy with the Kingdom of Lombardy–Venetia.

In 1841, Assiano was merged with Muggiano and in 1869, the two were annexed to Baggio. Baggio, in turn, became part of Milan in 1923.
