= Bárbara Bonola =

Mexican triathlete

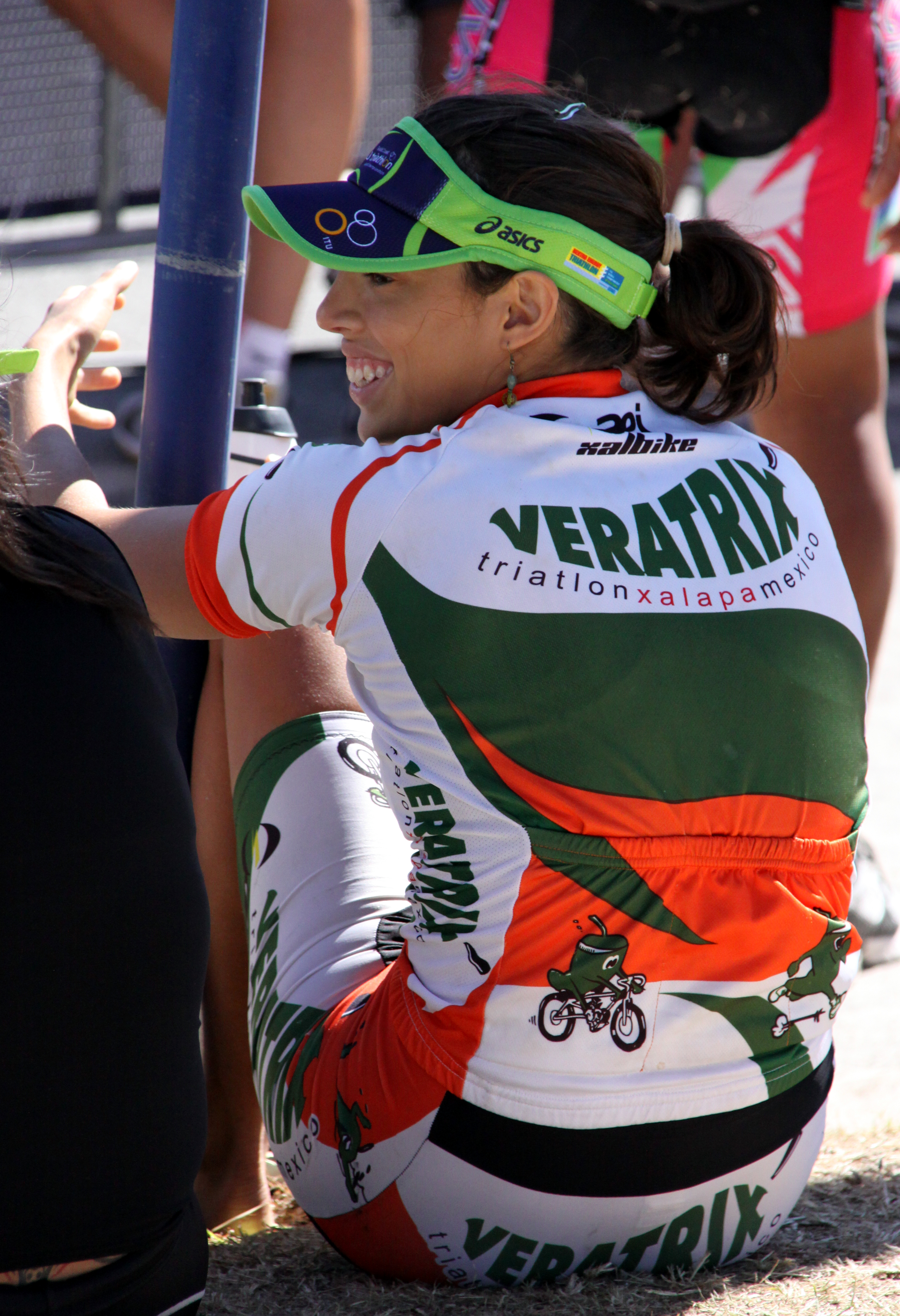
- Bárbara Bonola at Southport, Gold Coast, 2009

Personal information
- Born: 1987 (age 38–39) Xalapa, Veracruz

Sport
- Country: Mexico

Bárbara Leticia Bonola Jiménez (born 1987 in Xalapa, Veracruz) is a Mexican professional triathlete and member of the National Team.

== Biography ==
Bárbara Bonola was listed as fifth in the U23 ranking of the Mexican Triathlon Federation of the year 2009. In 2010, she was thirteenth in the U23 ranking.

In Mexico she is coached by Eugenio Chimal Domínguez of the club Veratrix and represents the elite club of her native town Triatlón Sports Xalapa, founded by her father, the Mexican triathlete and trainer Vladimir Bonola Pérez, at the beginning of the year 2009.

In the Olimpiada Nacional she was always among the best ten Mexican triathletes, in 2009 she was number 9 in the category 20–23 years, in 2010 she placed 8th.

Since 2007 she has taken part in several ITU triathlons. She was also a member of the official Mexican delegation at the World Championships in Southport / Gold Coast (2009), in Vancouver (2008) and in Hamburg (2007), placing 10th, 10th and 13th respectively in the age group 20-24 (i.e. not in the elite or U23 category). At the Gold Coast Grand Final in 2009 there were non Mexican participants in the U23 race and in the age group race (20–24) Bonola was the second best Mexican athlete (Michelle Flipo: 7th, Bonola: 10th, Monica Vargas: 15th, Lucero Vargas: 33rd, Eddaly Sanchez Aquino: 51st).

Bárbara Bonola did the Licenciatura in business administration at the Escuela de Administración de Empresas Turísticas of the University of Xalapa.

== ITU Competitions ==
The following list is based upon the official ITU rankings and the Athlete's Profile Page. Unless indicated otherwise the following events are triathlons (Olympic Distance) and belong to the Elite category.

Date	Competition	Place	Rank
2007-09-02	BG World Championships (Age Group 20–24)	Hamburg	13
2008-03-08	Pan American Cup	Valle de Bravo	11
2008-04-06	Pan American Cup	Lima	9
2008-04-19	PATCO Pan American Cup (U23)	Mazatlan	8
2008-04-19	PATCO Pan American Championship	Mazatlan	23
2008-05-18	Pan American Cup = Central American and Caribbean Championships	Ixtapa	9
2008-06-07	BG World Championships (Age Group 20–24)	Vancouver	10
2008-10-26	BG World Cup	Huatulco	DNF
2009-06-28	Pan American Cup	Puerto Vallarta	4
2009-09-12	Dextro Energy World Championship Series, Grand Final (Age Group 20–24)	Gold Coast	10

DNF = did not finish
