= Gallaratese =

Coordinates: 45°29′39″N 9°07′03″E

- Quartiere of Milan
- The thermal power station (left) and the "tower houses" (right)
- Interactive map of Gallaratese
- Country: Italy
- Region: Lombardy
- Province: Milan
- Comune: Milan
- Zone: 8
- Time zone: UTC+1 (CET)
  - Summer (DST): UTC+2 (CEST)

Gallaratese is a district ("quartiere") of Milan, Italy, part of the Zone 8 administrative division of the city. It is located about 7 km north-west of the city centre. It borders on the comune of Pero to the north and on the districts of Trenno to the west and Lampugnano to the south; to the east, its ideal border is the eponymous street, which in turn is named after Gallarate, the town it leads to.

== History ==
The tower houses

The project for the Gallaraterse district was first laid down by architect Piero Bottoni in the mid 20th century. The objective was to create a low-income housing district with green areas, effective traffic connection to the city, and functional public services. Construction began in 1957, from a first core of the district named "Gallaratese G.1". The original plan by Bottoni was then refined and developed by over 60 architects, led by Gianluigi Reggio.
