= Affori =

Coordinates: 45°31′02″N 9°10′10″E

- Ward
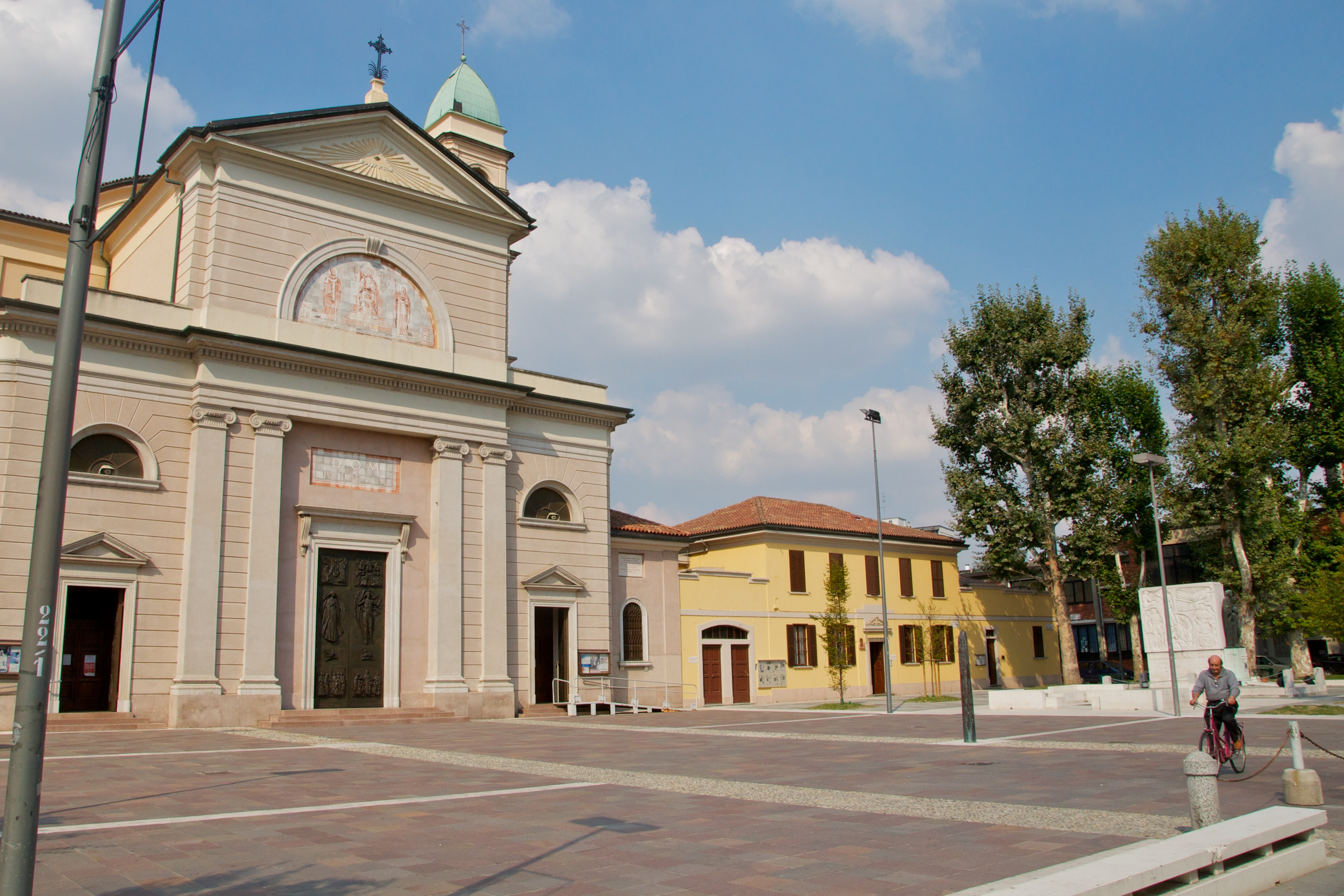
- Central plaza of Affori, with the Santa Giustina church
- Interactive map of Affori
- Country: Italy
- Region: Lombardy
- Province: Milan
- Comune: Milan
- Zone: 9
- Time zone: UTC+1 (CET)
  - Summer (DST): UTC+2 (CEST)

Affori is a ward of Milan, Italy, part of the Zone 9 administrative division of the city, located north of the city centre. It borders with the wards of Bruzzano, Comasina, Bovisasca, Dergano, and Niguarda. Before being annexed to Milan in 1923, it was an autonomous comune.

== History ==
The rural settlement of Affori is referenced as early as 915, although in early references the name of the place is variously spelled Affoni, Afoni, Afori or Avoni. This toponym is of uncertain origin; it might be from a Roman anthroponym "Afer", or from the Latin ad forum ("by the market", possibly a reference to a local market) or even from ad fontem ("by the spring", in reference to a local spring of water. It has also been suggested that the name might be from ad foris, "outside", which was used to refer to the church of Affori (Sanca Iustina a foris) as the church was "outside" the walls of Milan. It has also been observed that "Affori" is also a family name which is found, for example, in some areas of the Ticino river basin.

Remnants of the medieval borgo in modern Affori include a watchtower (located in Via Osculati and dating back to the 14th century). The historic centre of Affori is found at the corners of the streets Via Taccioli and Via Cialdini.

While Affori was located on a road connecting Milan to Como, this road was secondary, the main thoroughfares passing respectively west of the borgo (the modern Via Bovisasca, which was mostly used for military purposes) and one to the east (the modern Via Giuditta Pasta, for civilian and commercial traffic). As a consequence, the development of Affori was slower than that of the surrounding settlements that were closer to, or traversed by, these main roads. As a consequence of this secondary role of Affori, the borgo was split in two parts when the Milanese territory was partitioned into pieves; the eastern part was assigned to the pieve of Bruzzano, while the western part was assigned to the pieve of Bollate.

The economy of the borgo was based on agriculture; its territory housed several cascine (farms). A major source of income was the cultivation of mulberries and sericulture.

In 1686, Pier Paolo Corbella became duke of Affori; he bought a large piece of land in the area and ordered the construction of a luxury villa, now known as Villa Litta. This boosted the economy of Affori, which became largely dependent by the villa itself. Another major thrust to the development of Affori came between the 18th and 19th centuries, when a new road was built to connect Milan to Como; the new road (which corresponds to what are now Via Imbonati, Via Pellegrino Rossi, Via Astesani and Via Comasina) traversed Affori, which thus became one of the most important settlements north of Milan.

During Napoleonic rule, in 1808, Affori was briefly annexed to Milan, but regained its autonomy in 1816.

In 1869 Affori, Bruzzano, Bresso and Dergano were merged into a comune named Affori e uniti ("Affori and united"). Bresso regained its autonomy in 1884, but Bruzzano and Dergano remained part of the comune, which would eventually be renamed just "Affori" (in 1912).

At the turn of the 19th century, Milan was quickly growing as a consequence of the industrialization process. Its relationship with adjacent comuni became stricter, and Affori became de facto a district of the city. Transportation between Milan and Affori developed quickly since the last decade of the 19th century, with the construction of a railway and the established of a horse-driven tramway in 1882, that was replaced in 1898 by an electrical tramway.

This was formalized in 1923 when Affori was annexed to Milan along with several other comuni.

== Places of interest ==
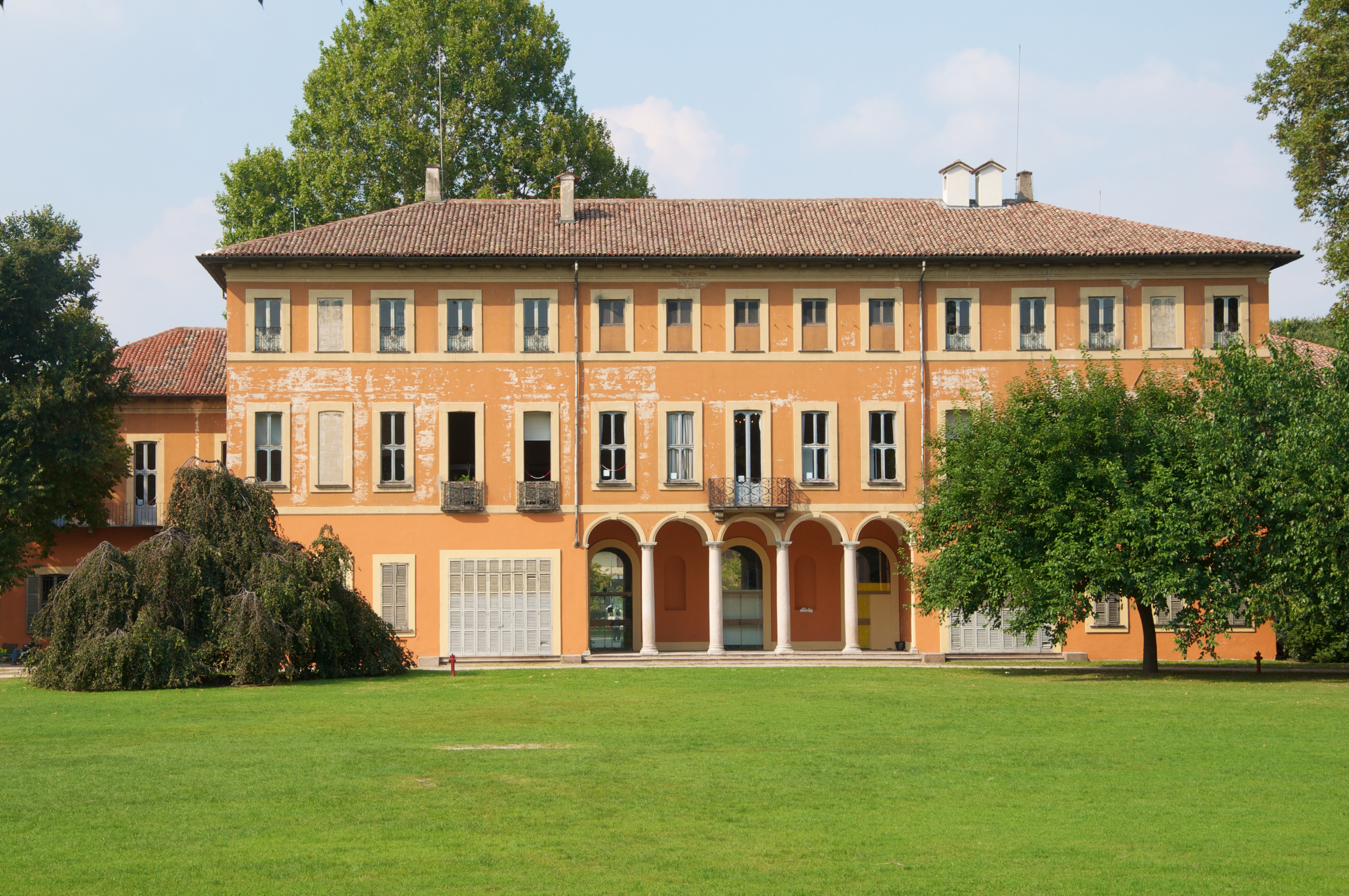
Facade of Villa Litta in Affori

The main historical building of Affori is Villa Litta, a 17th-century luxury villa located within the oldest city park of the Milanese area. The villa was owned by several families of the Milanese aristocracy, namely the Corbella, the D'Adda and the Litta.

The next most important monument is the church of Santa Giustina; it houses a painting, credited to Ambrogio de Predis, that has raised the interest of art scholars because of its similarity to Leonardo da Vinci's Virgin of the Rocks. The church also has a notable organ created by the Amati luthiers' family.

Other places of interest in Affori include the Paolo Pini Art Gallery (established in 1995), which has paintings by contemporary artists such as Enrico Baj, Günter Brus, Martin Disler, Piero Gilardi, Giuseppe Maraniello, Klaus Karl Mehrkens, Aldo Spoldi, Emilio Tadini, and Bernd Zimmer, and the Affori Library, a large public library which is best known for its corpus of children literature and comics.

== Transportation ==
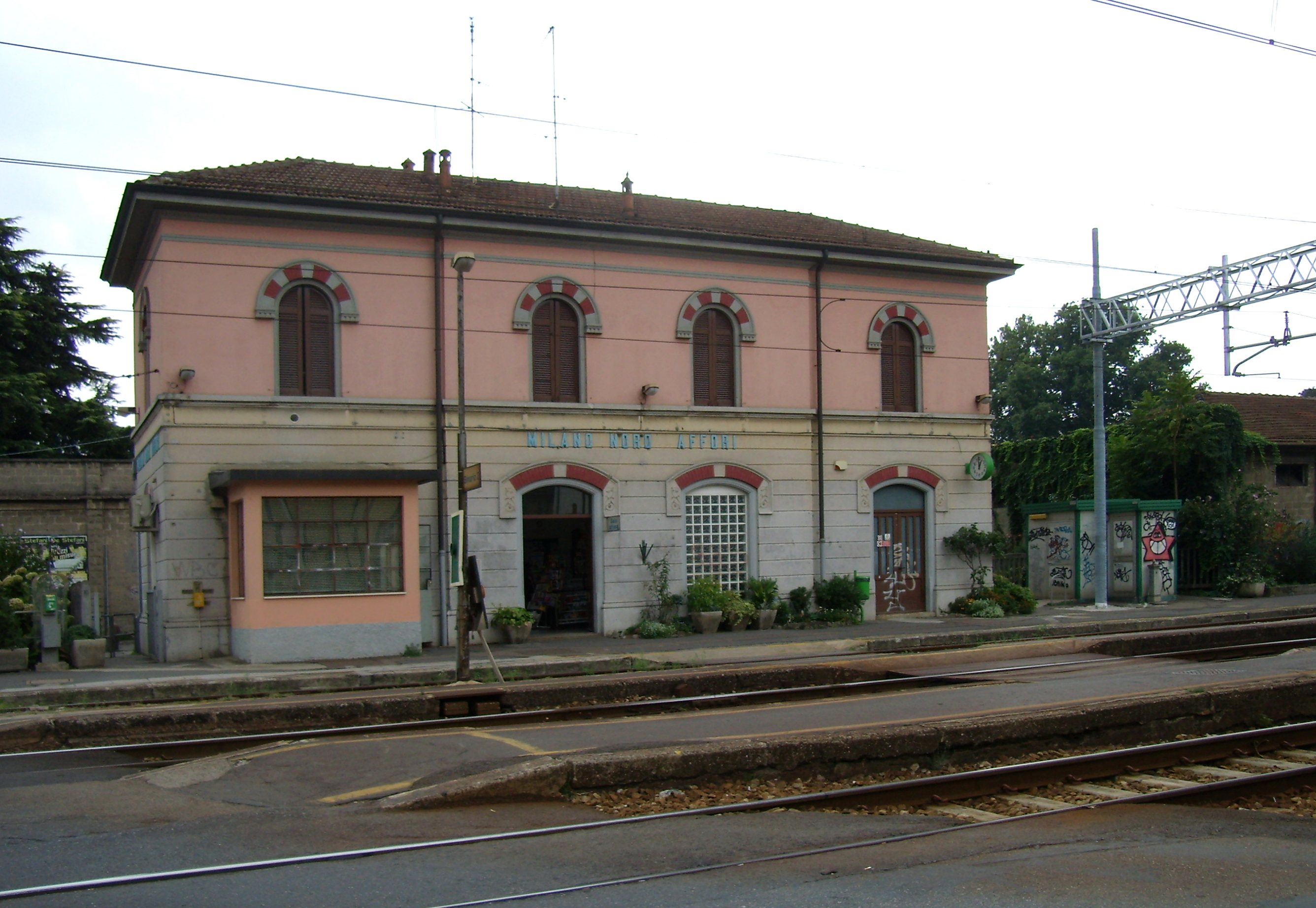
The former Affori railway station

Affori is well connected to the centre of Milan by bus lines, tramways and railway; two stops of the Milan Metro subway are situated in central Affori (Affori Centro) and the area of the railway station (Affori FN).

== The Affori concert band ==
Affori hosts the prominent historic community band of the Milanese area, the "Corpo Musicale Gaetano Donizetti", established in 1853 and still in activity. The band is informally known as "Banda d'Affori" (Band of Affori).

== Politics ==
Affori houses the national headquarters of the Lega Nord political party.
