= Lampugnano =

Coordinates: 45°29′10″N 9°07′40″E

- Quartier of Milan
- Interactive map of Lampugnano
- Country: Italy
- Region: Lombardy
- Province: Milan
- Comune: Milan
- Zone: 8
- Time zone: UTC+1 (CET)
  - Summer (DST): UTC+2 (CEST)

Lampugnano is a district (quartiere) of Milan, Italy, part of the Zone 8 administrative division of the city. Until 1841, it was an autonomous comune. A prominent structure of Lampugnano is PalaSharp, which used to be one of Milan's major indoor arenas, housing sporting events, concerts, live shows and political meetings.

The nearby Milan Metro subway is also adjacent to a bus terminal and a major parking, and is thus a reference place for many commuters who travel daily to the city from the western part of the Metropolitan City of Milan.

== History ==
Lampugnano existed as a distinct settlement at least since the Middle Ages. When the Milanese area was subdivided into pieves, Lampugnano was assigned to the pieve of Trenno. During Napoleonic rule it was briefly annexed to Milan (1808–1816), but regained its independence with the Kingdom of Lombardy–Venetia. In 1841 Lampugnano ceased to exist as an autonomous comune and was annexed to Trenno, which in turn became part of Milan in 1923.

Until World War II, Lampugnano maintained its rural character, but thereafter experienced a quick urbanization process, along with adjacent district such as QT8 and Gallaratese.
