= Figino (district of Milan) =

Coordinates: 45°29′37″N 9°04′32″E

- Quartiere of Milan
- Interactive map of Figino
- Country: Italy
- Region: Lombardy
- Province: Milan
- Comune: Milan
- Zone: 7
- Time zone: UTC+1 (CET)
  - Summer (DST): UTC+2 (CEST)

Figino is a district ("quartiere") of Milan, Italy, part of the Zone 7 administrative division. It is located north-west of the centre, within the Parco Agricolo Sud Milano nature reserve. Before being annexed to Milan, in 1869, it was an autonomous comune, named Figino di Milano.

== Overview ==
The name "Figino" is usually supposed to come from the Latin word figulinum, meaning "potter". Some sources report etylomogies, i.e., from ficus or ficulinus (fig tree) or fageus (beech).

Figino is a peripheral district and has preserved its rural character despite being annexed to Milan. The westernmost part of the district, which borders on Rho, is part of the Parco dei Fontanili, a nature reserve characterized by several water springs ("fontanili").

== History ==
The rural settlement of Figino is reported at least since the Middle Ages; it is reported as a comune in a 1257 document. When the Milanese territory was partitioned in pieves, it was included in the pieve of Trenno, where it remained until well into the 18th century.

Under Napoleonic rule, it was annexed to Settimo Milanese, but regained its autonomy with the Kingdom of Lombardy–Venetia. At the unification of Italy (1859), the population of Figino was 589; in 1861, at the first census, it was 607. In 1862 it was formally named "Figino di Milano".

In 1869 Figino ceased to be an autonomous comune, becoming a frazione of Trenno, which in turn was annexed to Milan in 1923.
