= Settimo Milanese =

Settimo Milanese Settim
- Comune
- Comune di Settimo Milanese
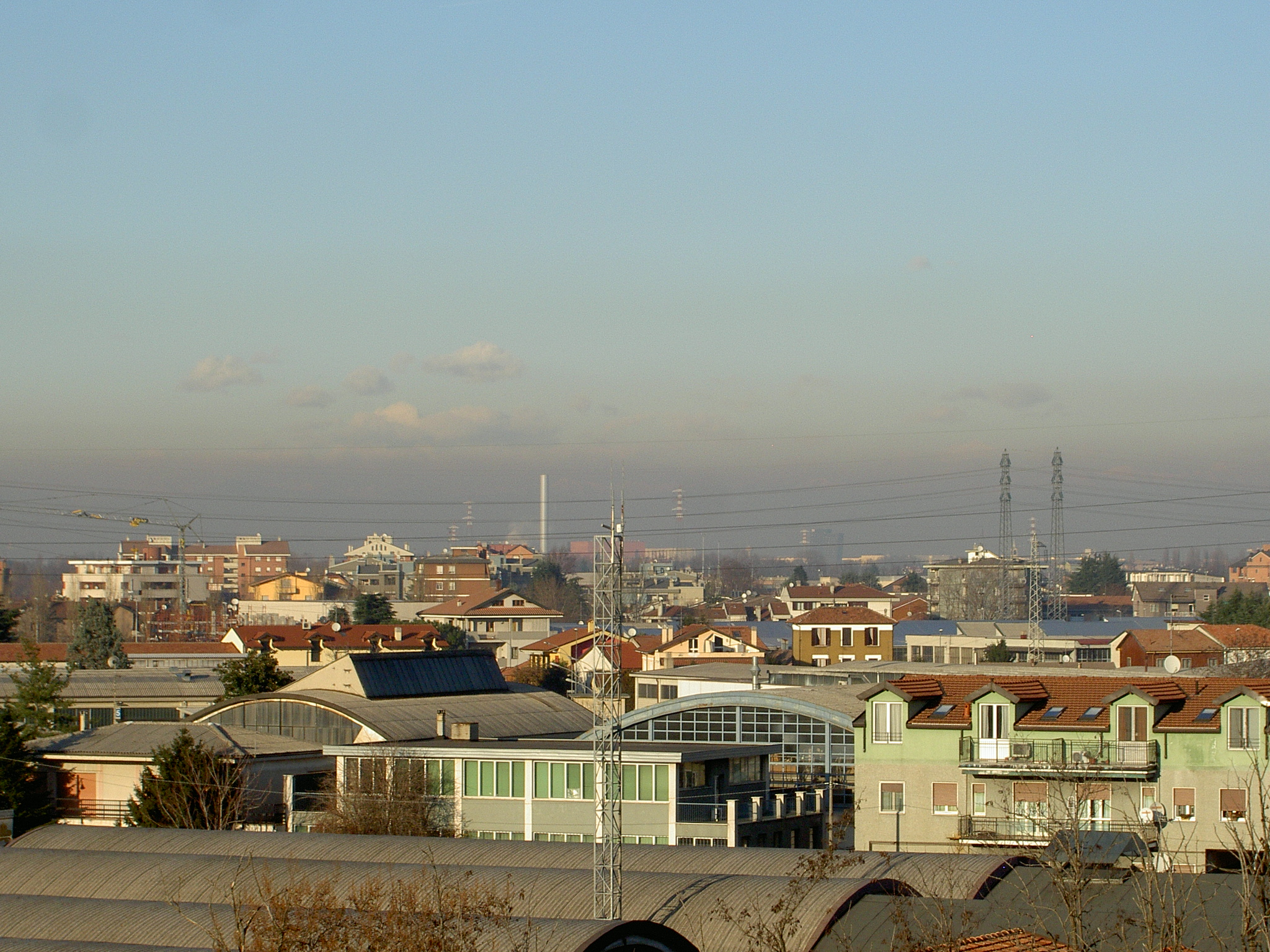

- Coat of arms

- Location within Italy Location within Lombardy
- Coordinates: 45°29′N 9°3′E
- Country: Italy
- Region: Lombardy
- Metropolitan city: Milan (MI)
- Frazioni: Vighignolo, Seguro, Villaggio Cavour, Cascine olona

Government
  - Mayor: Massimo Sacchi

Area
  - Total: 10.8 km^{2} (4.2 sq mi)
- Elevation: 134 m (440 ft)

Population (31 December 2021)
  - Total: 20,137
  - Density: 1,860/km^{2} (4,830/sq mi)
- Demonym: Settimini
- Time zone: UTC+1 (CET)
  - Summer (DST): UTC+2 (CEST)
- Postal code: 20019
- Dialing code: 02
- Patron saint: St. Ambrose
- Website: Official website

Settimo Milanese (Milanese: Settim [ˈsɛtim]) is a comune (municipality) in the Province of Milan in the Lombardy region of Italy. It is about 9 kilometres (6 mi) west of the city centre of Milan.

The industrial district of Castelletto is home to Italtel and STMicroelectronics.

Settimo Milanese borders Rho, Milan, Cornaredo, and Cusago.

== Toponymy ==
It's believed that the name comes from the distance between Settimo and Milan: it is in fact located near the seventh milestone of the road from Milan to Novara. The epithet "Milanese" was added after the unification of Italy to distinguish it from other towns with the same name.
