= Quinto Romano =

Coordinates: 45°28′31″N 9°05′22″E

Quinto Romano Quint (Lombard)
- Quartiere of Milan
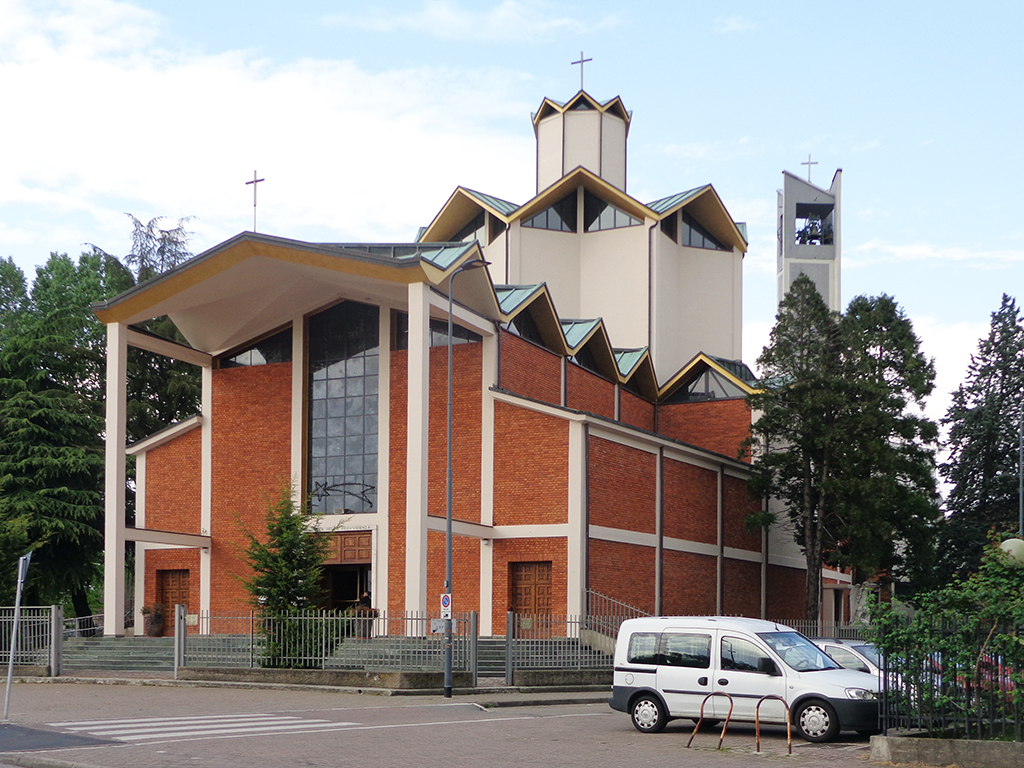
- A church in Quinto Romano
- Interactive map of Quinto Romano
- Country: Italy
- Region: Lombardy
- Province: Milan
- Comune: Milan
- Zone: 7
- Time zone: UTC+1 (CET)
  - Summer (DST): UTC+2 (CEST)

Quinto Romano (Milanese: Quint) is a district (quartiere) of Milan, Italy, part of the Zone 7 administrative division of the city. Before being annexed to Milan, it was an autonomous comune (until 1869) and a frazione of Trenno (from 1869 to 1923).

Quinto Romano was a rural district until the 1960s; the land was then partitioned into 8-9 cascine (farms). In the following decades, as most of the Milanese rural outskirts, Quinto experienced a quick urbanization process as a consequence of the economic boom of northern Italy and immigration from the south, which caused a quick expansion of Milan and other industrial cities. As is the case with other outskirts that have experienced this rapid development in those decades, Quinto gained the reputation of a socially and economically degraded district.

Quinto houses "Aquatica", the most important waterpark in Milan.
