= Trenno =

Coordinates: 45°29′28″N 9°06′01″E

- Quartiere of Milan
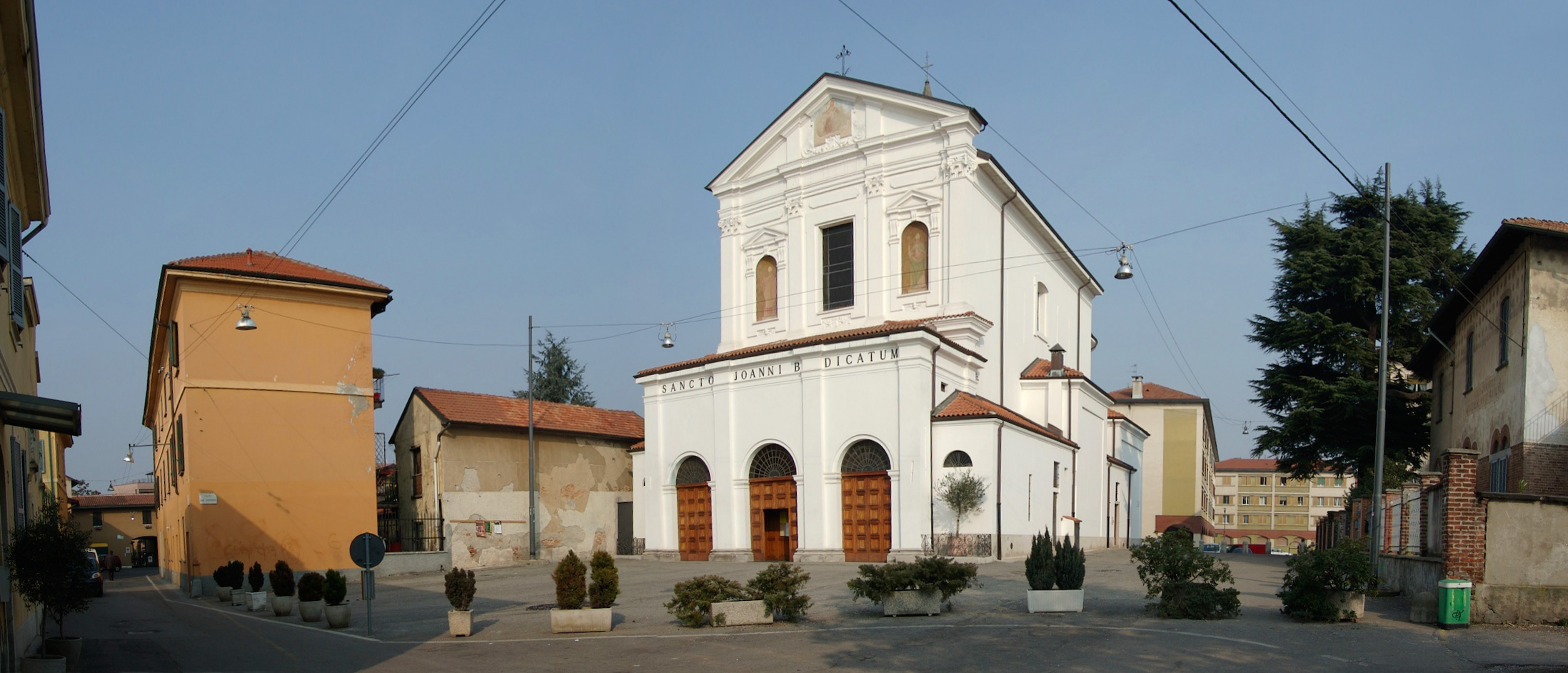
- Saint John's Church
- Interactive map of Trenno
- Country: Italy
- Region: Lombardy
- Province: Milan
- Comune: Milan
- Zone: 8
- Time zone: UTC+1 (CET)
  - Summer (DST): UTC+2 (CEST)

Trenno is a district ("quartiere") of Milan, Italy, part of the Zone 8 administrative division of the city. It borders on green areas to the north and west (on the Boscoincittà city park) and to the south (on the Parco di Trenno); to the east, it is adjacent to the Gallaratese district. Before being annexed to Milan, in 1923, it was an autonomous comune.

The district is mostly residential, with low- and medium-income apartment blocks dominating its skyline, although the centre has maintained much of the flavour of a country town (as well as a cascina, "Cascina Campi"); it also has large green areas, the most important of which is the eponymous Parco di Trenno.

In 2017, there was a local outcry over the planned demolition of an 18th century mill, in order to build a train yard.

The district is quite isolated from Milan, being connected to the centre by a single bus line and a few thoroughfares, some of which were still country roads until the late 1990s. The closest stop of the Milan Metro subway is in Bonola, about 1 km from Trenno.

== History ==
The settlement of Trenno exists at least since the Middle Ages as a rural borgo close to the Olona river. In the 19th century the settlement consisted on several cascine (farmhouses), some of which would later spawn independent settlements such as Quarto Cagnino, Quinto Romano and Figino, which would be annexed back to Trenno in 1869. All of these are now districts of Milan.
