= Cascina a corte =

Traditional style of farmhouse found in Northern Italy

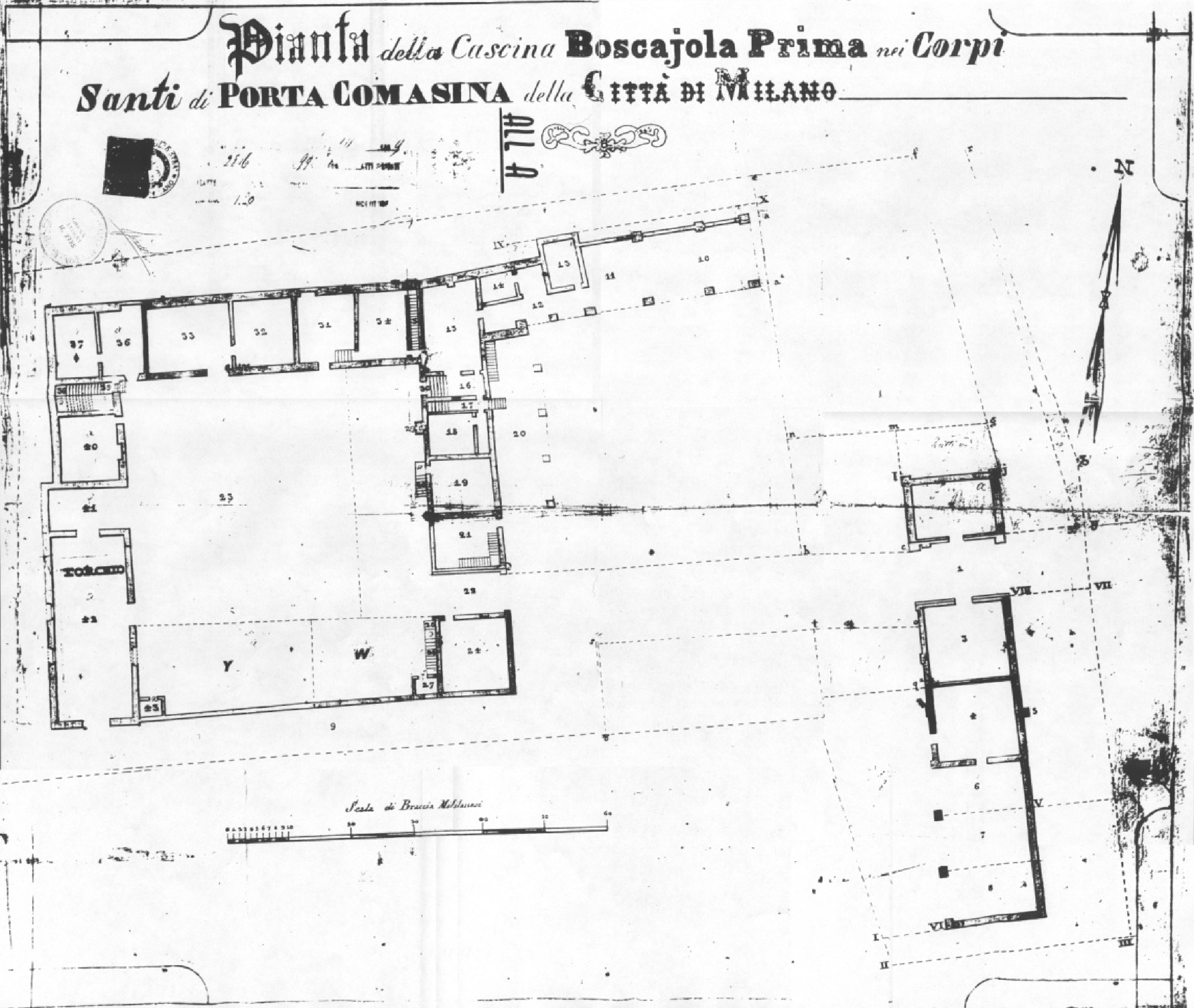
Planimetrics of Cascina Boscajola in Milan.

Cascina a corte (Italian: [kaʃˈʃiːna a kˈkorte]; lit. 'courtyard-provided farmstead'; plural: cascine a corte), or more simply cascina (Lombard: cassina [kaˈsina]; Piedmontese: cassin-a [kaˈsiŋa]), refers to a type of rural building traditional of the Po Valley, northern Italy, especially of Lombardy and of some areas of Piedmont and Emilia-Romagna.

Also known as cascine lombarde or just cascine, these buildings are reported in the Po Valley at least since the 16th century, even though they became common in the 18th and 19th centuries. In particular, during the Napoleonic era, a number of religious buildings were confiscated and transformed into cascine.

== Etymology ==
The term cascina is attested ever since the Middle Ages, when it was often spelt capsina, caxina or cassina. The noun seems to be a derivative of Vulgar Latin capsia, meaning "corral", "stockyard" in English, but a common interpretation considers this word as a derivative of Old Italian cascio (Modern Italian cacio), literally cheese, a clear reference to cascine intended as dairy farms. The first records of farmhouses (then called cassine) date back to the 13th century. As early as the middle of the thirteenth century, in some areas of Lombardy, as in the countryside of Pavia and Milan, centralized farms had arisen, equipped with boxes, stables, houses, mills and tower defenses.

== Description ==
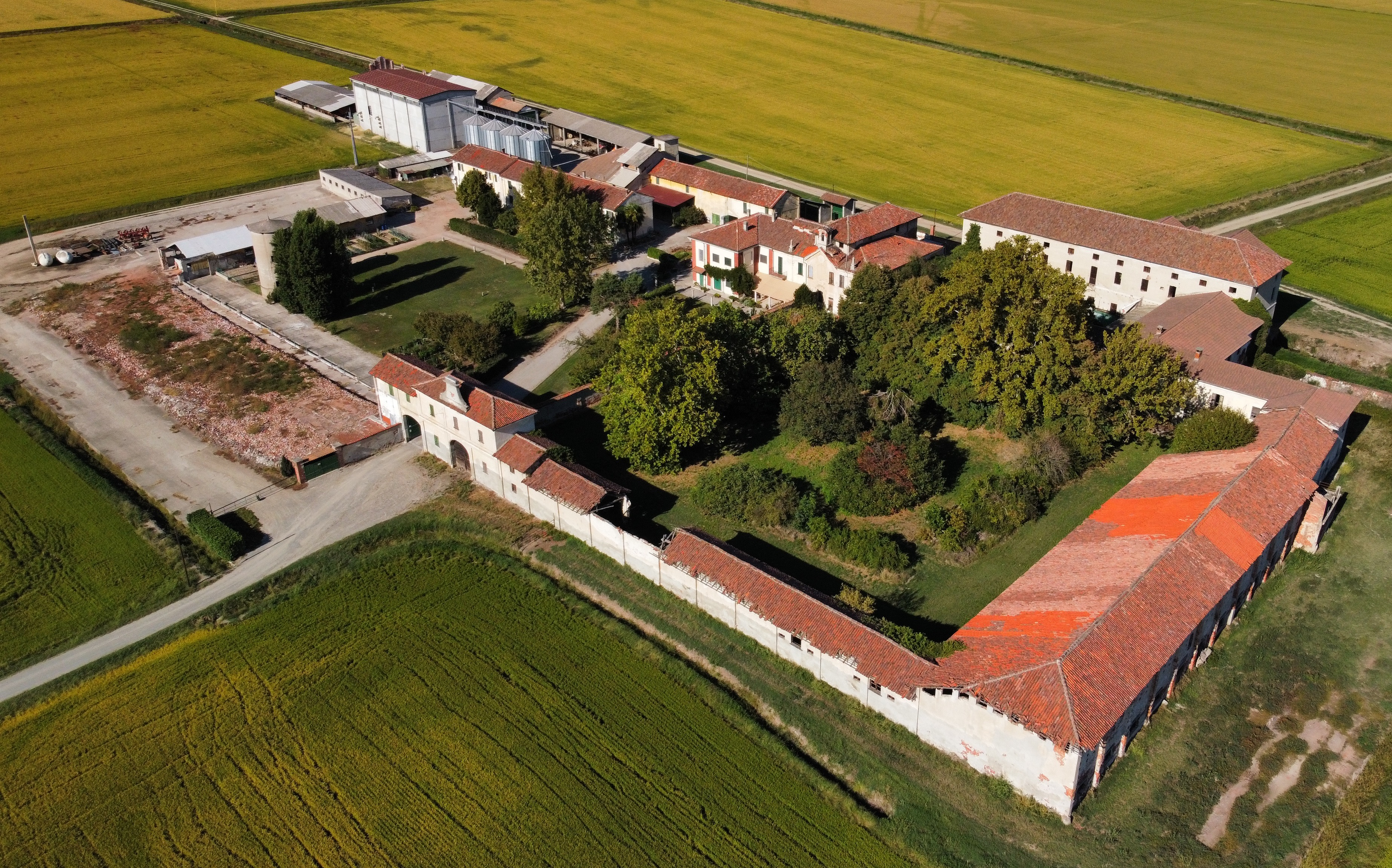
Cascina Buzzoletto Vecchio, near Garbagna Novarese

A typical cascina is a square-yarded farm (sometimes having multiple yards) located at the centre of a large piece of cultivated land. Different types of brick-wall buildings are lined on the perimeter of the courtyard, which typically includes houses (usually a main house for the farm owner's or tenant's family, and simpler buildings for the peasants' families), stables, barns, fountains, ovens, stores, mills and dairies. As most cascine were isolated, semi-autonomous settlements, with sometimes as much as one hundred inhabitants, many of them included public buildings such as churches, inns, or even schools. For the same reason, cascine were sometimes fortified structures, with defensive walls, towers, moats and drawbridges.

Cascine are found in most part of the Po Valley. Those from the High Po Valley (also known as the Dry Po Valley) are usually smaller and housed as much as 4-6 families, while those from the Low Po Valley easily reached 10-15 families of inhabitants or more (up to a maximum of 20-25).

Peasants working in the cascine, especially in large ones, had specialized jobs. For example, so-called "campari" were responsible for the maintenance of irrigation structures; "bergamini" looked after the cattle; "casari" worked in the dairy; "bifolchi" were responsible for ox-driven tillage (and "cavallanti" for horse-driven tillage); and "contadini" were factotum peasants, although their main task was that of harvesting hay for cattle feeding. In modern Italian language, most of these terms have fallen into disuse, with the exception of "contadini" (which has become the general term to refer to farmers) and "bifolchi" (which is only preserved in a derived, insulting meaning, similar to that of the English word "boor"). Of course, larger cascine also had carpenters, masons, blacksmiths, and other workers whose jobs were not directly related to agriculture or farming.

Production in the cascine of the Po Valley mainly consisted in wheat, maize, rice, barley, milk and cheese. Arboriculture was also common; cultivated trees included cottonwood, elm, and mulberry. Cascine located close enough to larger urban areas and cities (e.g. those in the Corpi Santi comune outside the walls of Milan) often specialized in cultivating fresh, perishable vegetables (e.g. cabbage or carrot), that were very profitable in urban markets.

== Decline and land use conversion ==
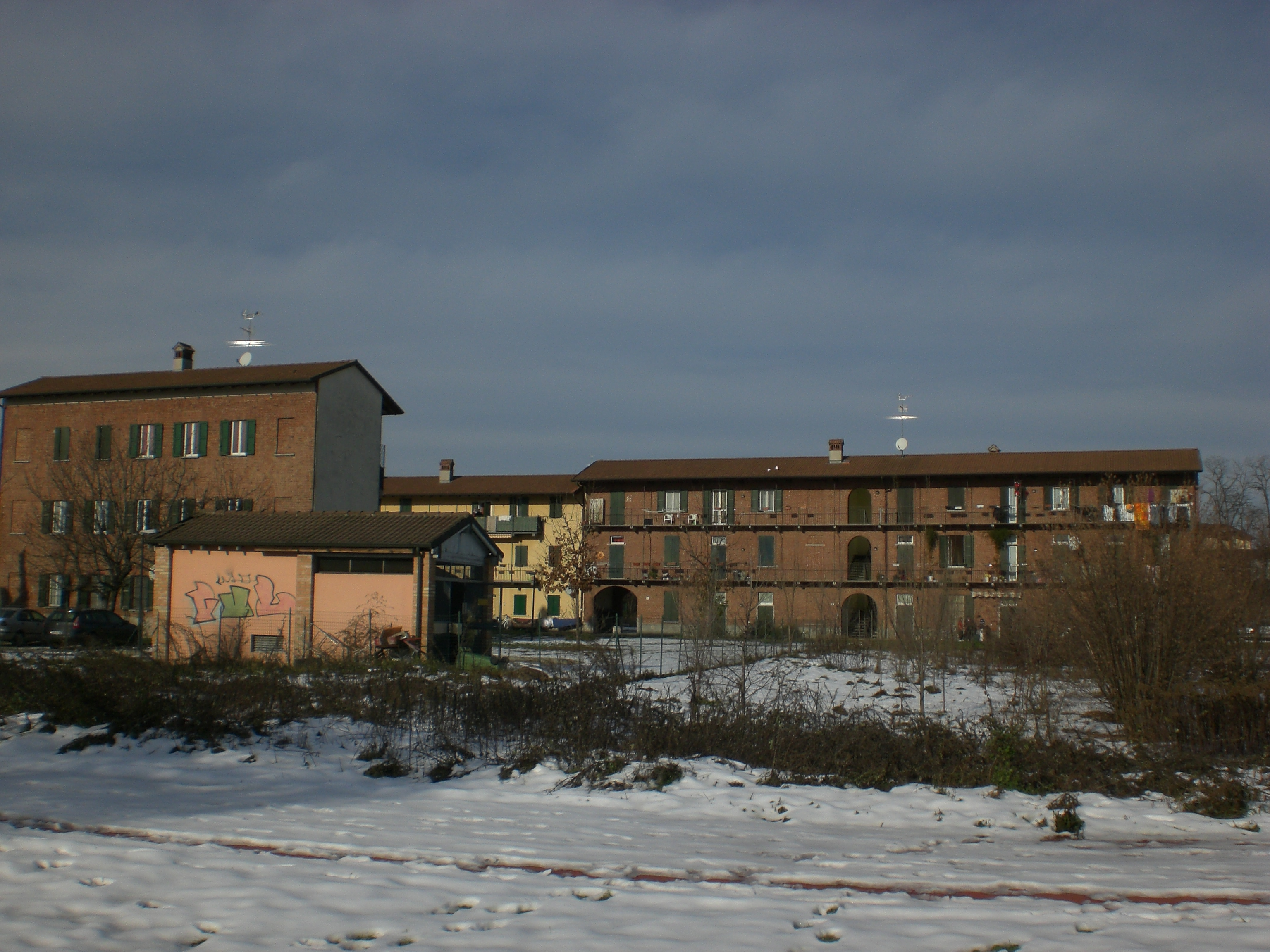
The Cascina Brughetto, located in the neighbourhood of Sant’Edoardo, Busto Arsizio, Lombardy, is one of few cascine that are still inhabited.

From an economic point of view, cascine have gone through a gradual but relentless decline throughout the 20th century, basically losing the function they formerly fulfilled in the Po Valley.

As a consequence of their abandon, many of these rural facilities have been demolished or still lie vacant and in decay today, as is the case with several cascine in the outlying areas of some Northern Italian cities. In other cases, cascine have been absorbed by the urban sprawl and have gone through a land use conversion, getting adapted for many different purposes such as residential buildings, educational buildings (e.g. libraries, schools...), hotels, restaurants, government buildings, commercial areas, etc.; all major airports in the Milanese area, for instance, were built on land that was previously occupied by cascine.

Nonetheless, old-fashioned functioning cascine can still be found in what remains of the Lombard and Po Valley countryside. For example, it has been reported that at least 43 cascine were still producing milk in the Province of Milan in 2008.

== Toponymic legacy ==
A number of modern toponyms from Lombardy and other areas of the Po Valley includes the word cascina (sometimes spelled cassina), as these place names refer to settlements which originated from a cascina: examples include Cascina Gobba and Cassina Triulza (neighbourhoods of Milan), Cassina de' Pecchi and Cassinetta di Lugagnano. Sometimes the noun cascina is just omitted and the toponym preserves the mere cascina's name, as is the case with several neighbourhoods from Turin such as Aurora, Falchera, Lingotto, Parella, etc.

== References in popular culture ==
Two popular movies that accurately depict daily life in a "cascina" are Ermanno Olmi's The Tree of Wooden Clogs (1978) and Bernardo Bertolucci's 1900 (1976). The latter is set in a cascina named "Corte delle Piacentine", located near Parma.

== Notable cascine ==
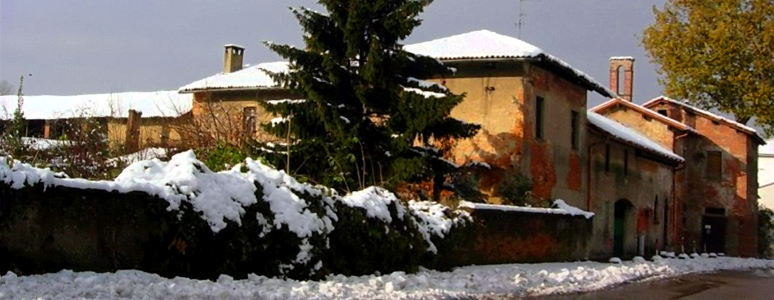
Cascina Linterno, Baggio

Cascina Linterno, in Baggio (Milan) is a heritage site protected by FAI and a national monument. Scholars believe that it used to be Francesco Petrarca's country residence, and that it was used as a seat of a Hospitaller or Templar community.

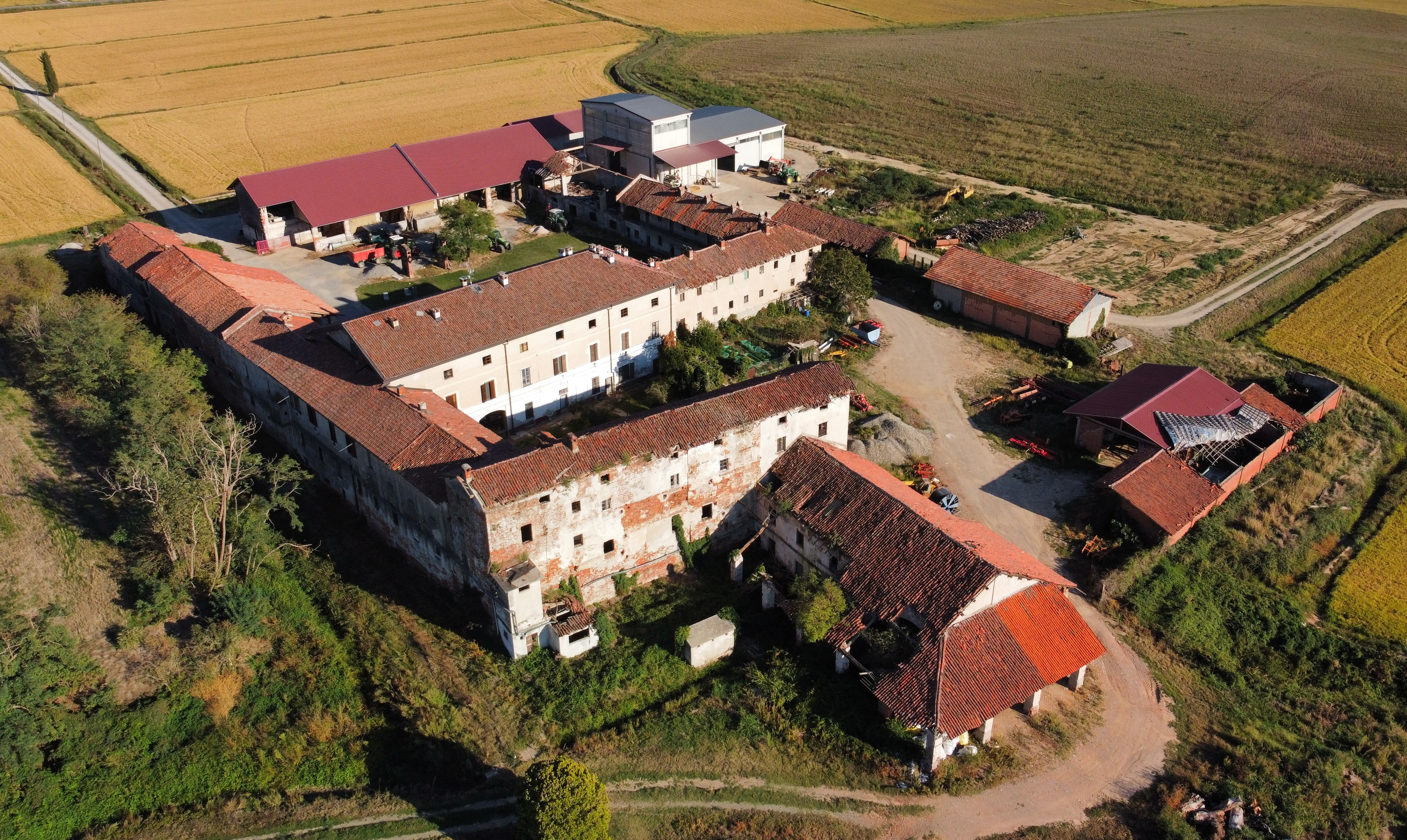
Cascina Moncucco, Garbagna Novarese

Moncucco, near Garbagna Novarese, was an autonomous municipality in the 17th century. On 23 February 1691 Pietro Antonio Manzoni, great-grandfather of Alessandro, purchased it as a fief (created on that occasion and dependent on Mirasole, a farmstead-castle near Caltignaga), ensuring the noble title Signore di Moncucco di Mirasole (Lord of Moncucco of Mirasole) to his family.

== See also ==
- Chalet
- Farmhouse
- Masia
