= Zone 4 of Milan =

Coordinates: 45.431573°N 9.244738°E

Zone 4 of Milan Municipality 4
- Municipality of Milan
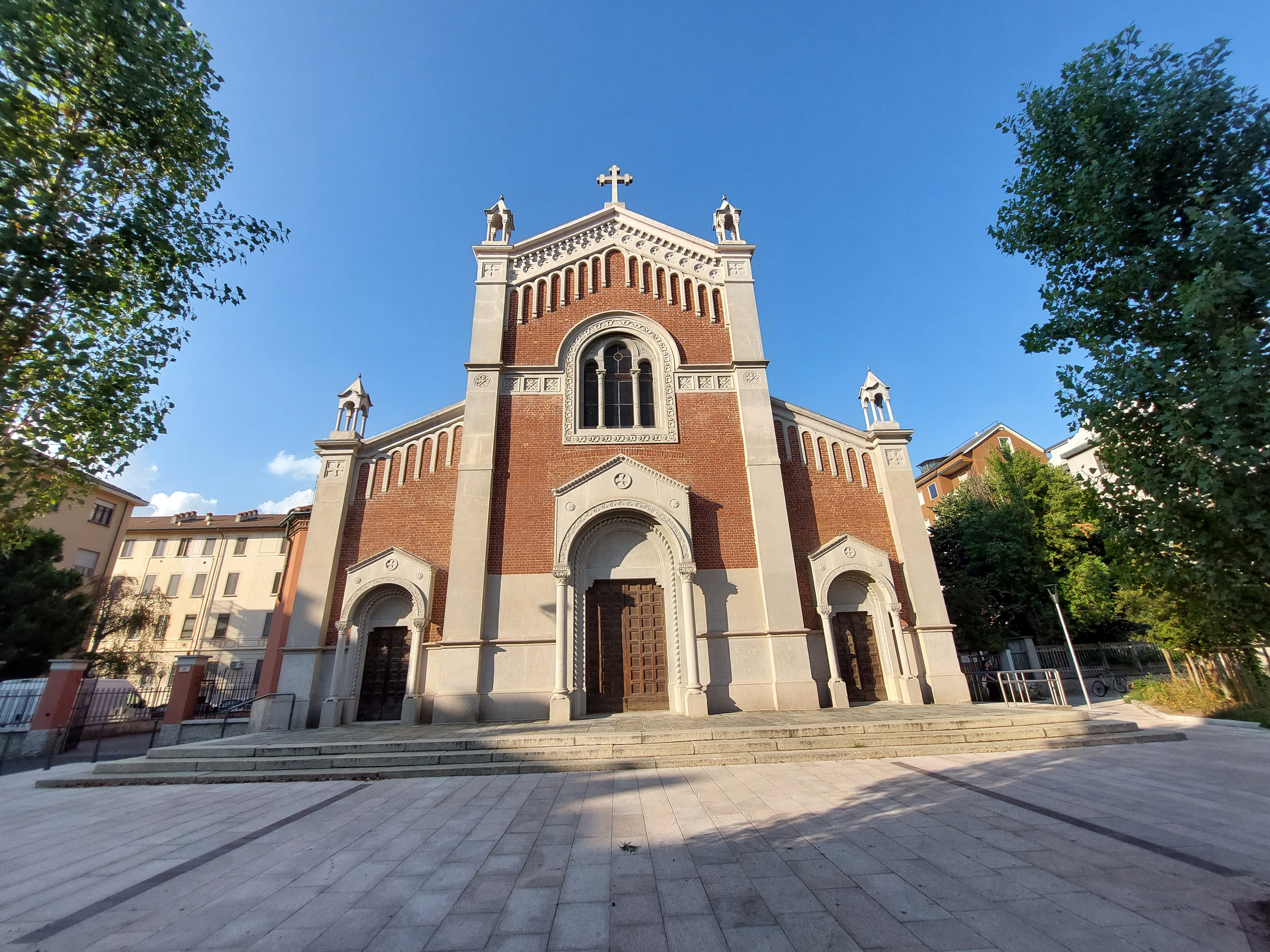
- Rogoredo

- Location of Zone 4 of Milan
- Country: Italy
- Region: Lombardy
- Province: Metro City of Milan
- Comune: Milan

Government
  - President: Stefano Bianco (PD)

Area
  - Total: 8.09 sq mi (20.95 km^{2})

Population (2023)
  - Total: 165,393
- Time zone: UTC+1 (CET)
  - Summer (DST): UTC+2 (CEST)

The Zone 4 of Milan, since 2016 officially Municipality 4 of Milan, (in Italian: Zona 4 di Milano, Municipio 4 di Milano) is one of the 9 administrative divisions of Milan, Italy.

It was officially created as an administrative subdivision during the 1980s. On 14 April 2016, in order to promote a reform on the municipal administrative decentralization, the City Council of Milan established the new Municipality 4, a new administrative body responsible for running most local services, such as schools, social services, waste collection, roads, parks, libraries and local commerce.

== Subdivision ==
The zone includes the following districts:

- Acquabella;
- Calvairate, already existing in 16th century and part of the comune of Corpi Santi, annexed to Milan in 1873. It changed from a rural to an urban district in the 1910s, when the first apartment blocks were built in the area. Nowadays, the district is mostly residential, albeit large green areas have been preserved;
- Castagnedo;
- Cavriano;
- Forlanini, a residential district, with 1960s apartment blocks being the most common type of buildings;
- Gamboloita;
- La Trecca;
- Monluè, a small residential district that originated as a rural settlement. As a consequence of its isolation from the city proper, it has maintained wide green areas (the most notable of which is Monluè Park) and the general appearance of a small country town. The prominent landmark of the district is the eponymous Cascina Monluè, an ancient abbey built by the Humiliati religious order, that has been later adapted as a cascina (farmhouse) and is now used as the venue for a number of concerts and cultural events;
- Morsenchio;
- Nosedo, autonomous comune until 1870. The district homes many cascine and has partially kept its rural character;
- Omero;
- Ponte Lambro, the outermost part of the zone, it is home to the oldest restaurant in Italy and the second in Europe, the Antica trattoria Bagutto, which has existed since at least 1284;
- Porta Vittoria;
- Porta Romana;
- Rogoredo, once part of the parish of Nosedo, in 1867 it became part of the Chiaravalle Milanese comune. It became part of Milan in 1923;
- San Luigi;
- Santa Giulia, a huge former industrial area it's now a luxury residential one, with a prestigious shopping mall (nicknamed "Montecity Avenue"), congress facilities and office buildings;
- Taliedo;
- Triulzo Superiore.

== Government ==
The area has its own local authority called Consiglio di Municipio (Municipal Council), composed by the President and 30 members directly elected by citizens every five years. The Council is responsible for most local services, such as schools, social services, waste collection, roads, parks, libraries and local commerce in the area, and manages funds (if any) provided by the city government for specific purposes, such as those intended to guarantee the right to education for poorer families.

The President is Stefano Bianco (PD), elected on 3-4 October 2021.

Here is the current composition of the Municipal Council after 2021 municipal election:

Alliance or political party	Members		Composition
Alliance or political party	2021–2026		Composition
Centre-left (PD-EV)	18	18 / 30	
Centre-right (FI-L-FdI-UDC)	11	11 / 30	
M5S	1	1 / 30	

Here is a full lists of the directly-elected Presidents of Municipio since 2011:

President	Term of office		Party
Loredana Bigatti	16 May 2011	27 June 2016	PD
Paolo Guido Giancarlo Maria Bassi	27 June 2016	8 October 2021	LN
Stefano Bianco	8 October 2021	Incumbent	PD

== Parks and gardens ==
In this borough there are many public parks and gardens. The most significant are Forlanini Park, Monluè Park, Cassinis and Alessandrini Parks.

== Transport ==
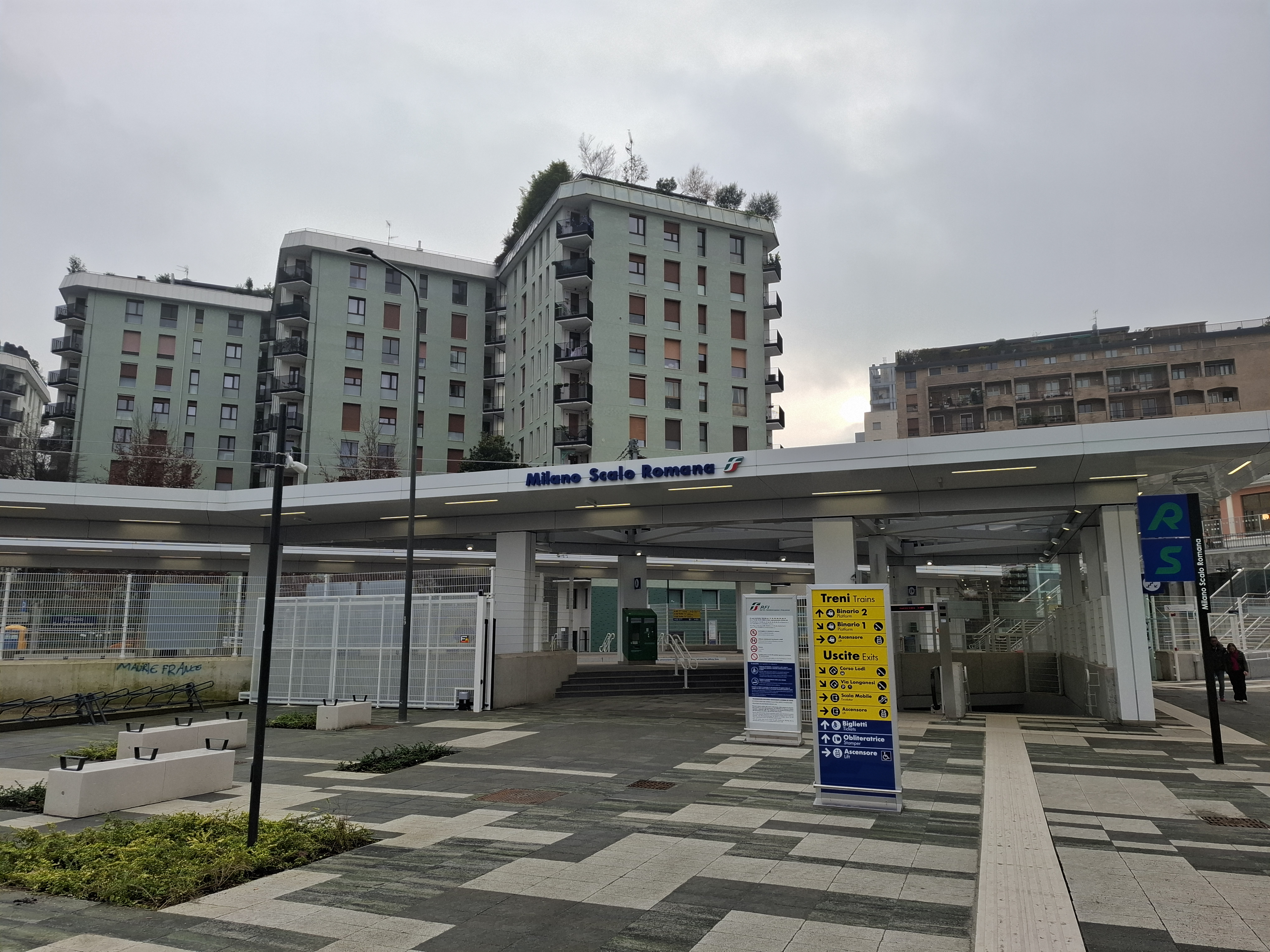
Milano Porta Romana railway station.

Stations of Milan Metro in the Zone 4:

- Brenta, Corvetto, Lodi T.I.B.B., Porta Romana, Porto di Mare, Rogoredo FS, San Donato;
- Stazione Forlanini, Repetti, Argonne, Susa, Dateo, Tricolore.

Suburban railway stations in the Zone 4:

- Milano Rogoredo
- Milano Porta Vittoria
- Milano Dateo
- Milano Forlanini
- Milano Porta Romana

== Notable places ==
- Milano Rogoredo railway station
- Alessandrini Park
- Forlanini Park

== Gallery ==
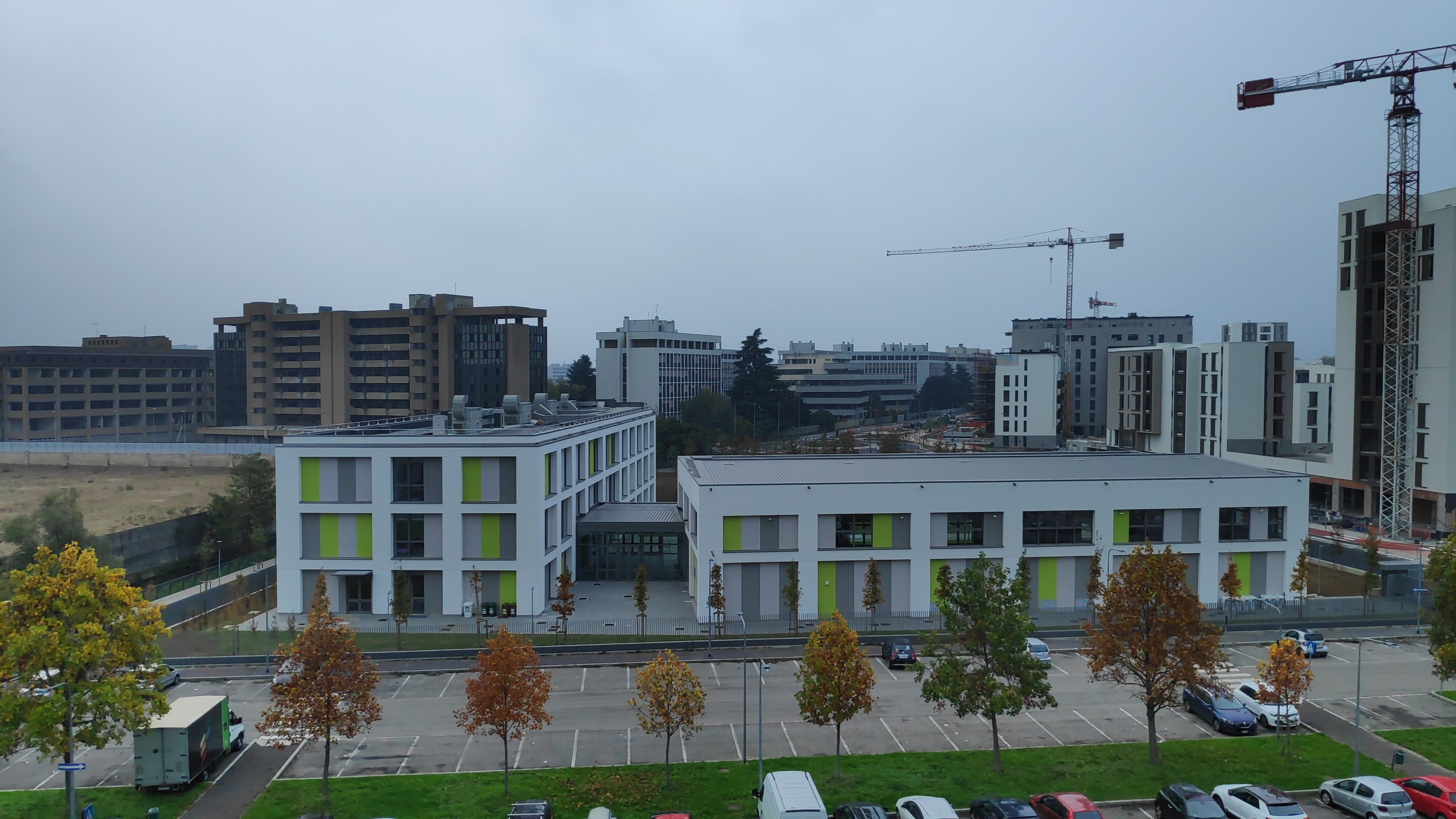
Middle School in Santa Giulia

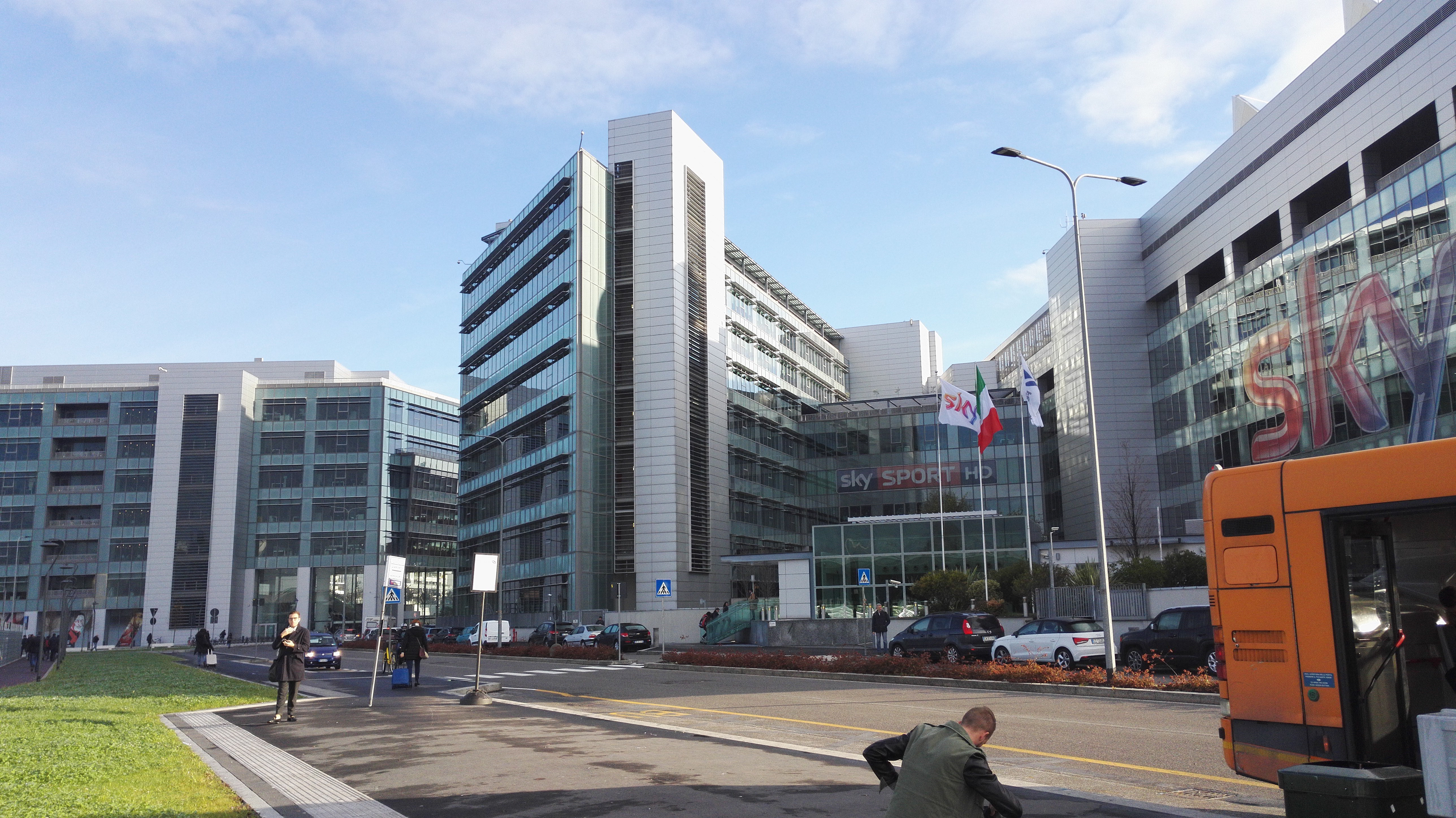
Sky Italia headquarter

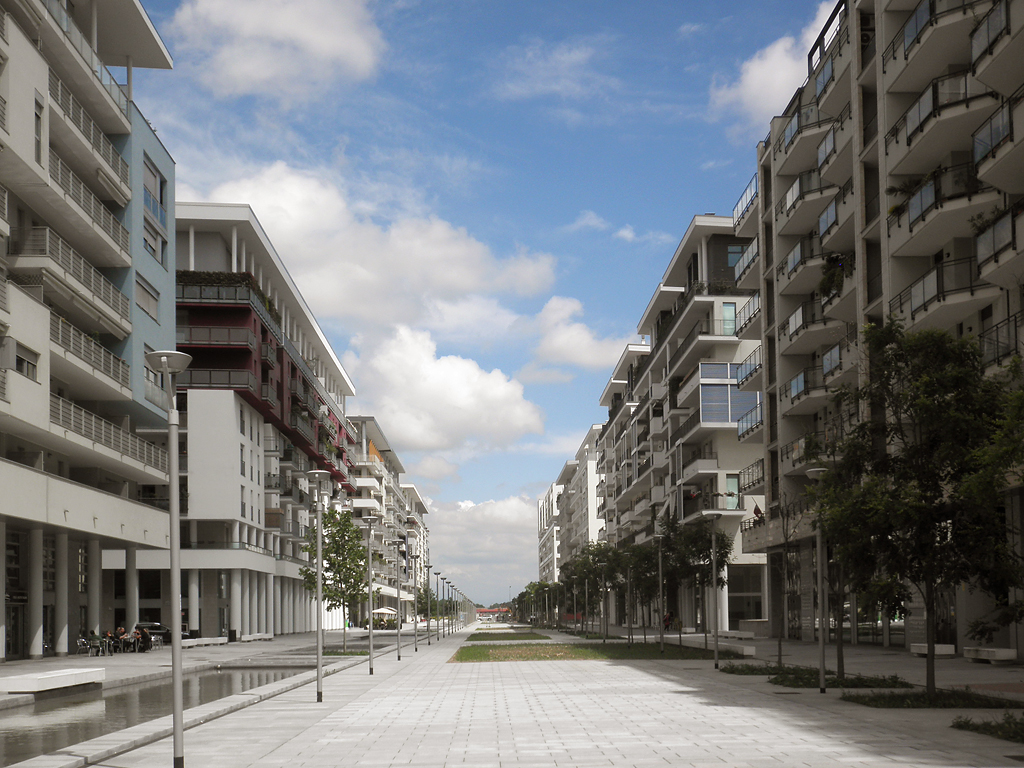
Via Cassinari pedestrian zone

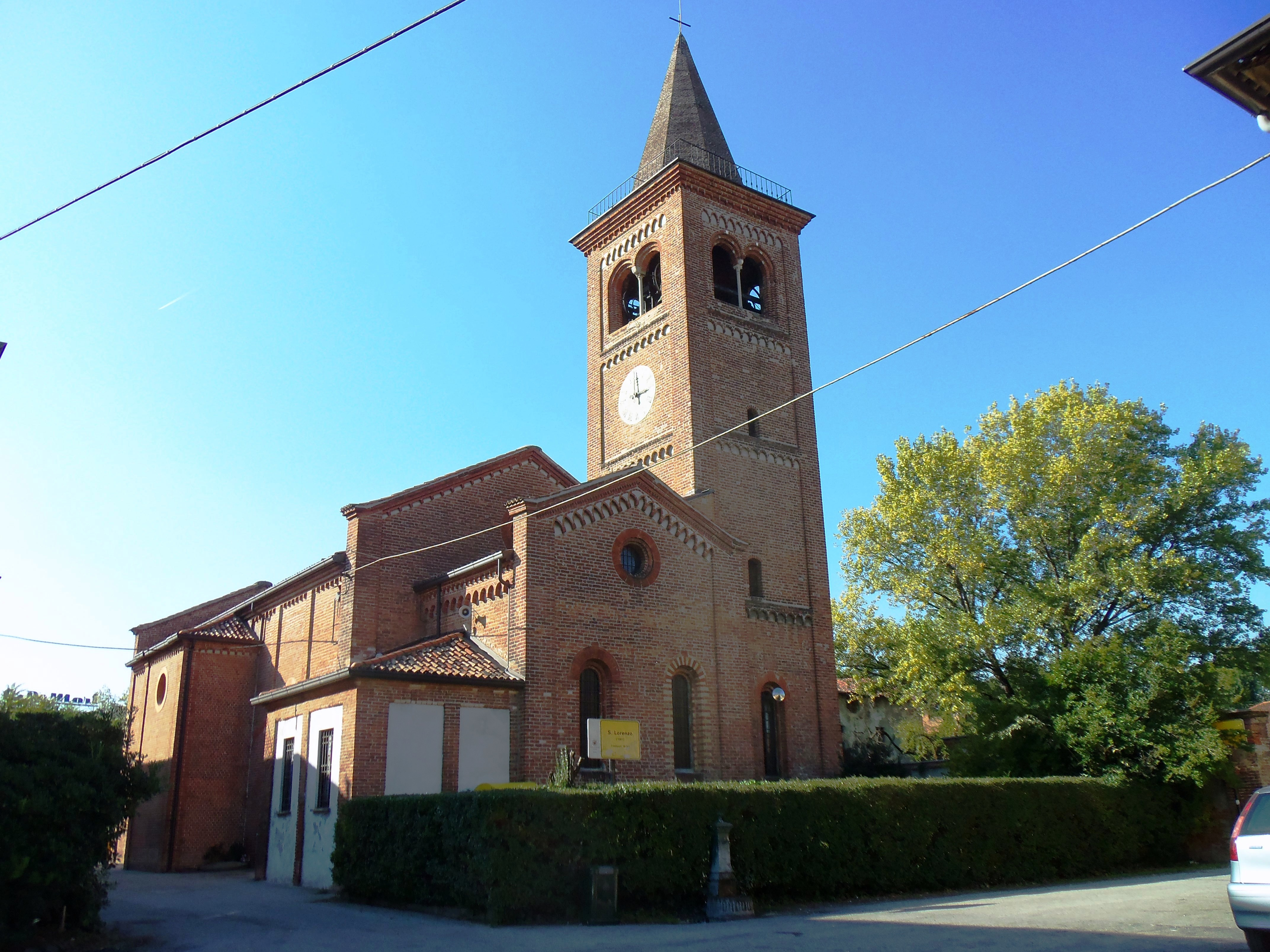
San Lorenzo in Monluè

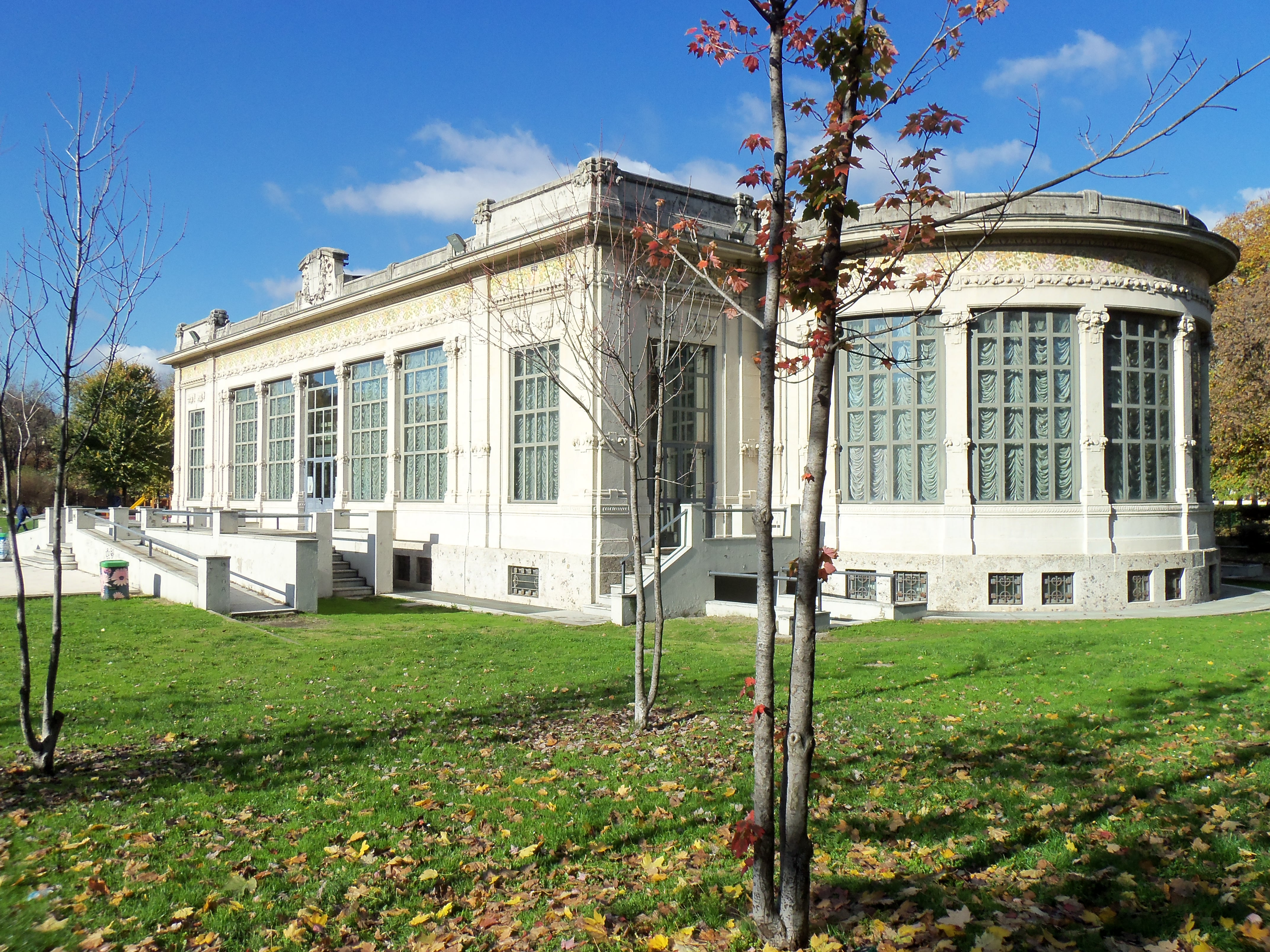
Palazzina Liberty in Formentano Park

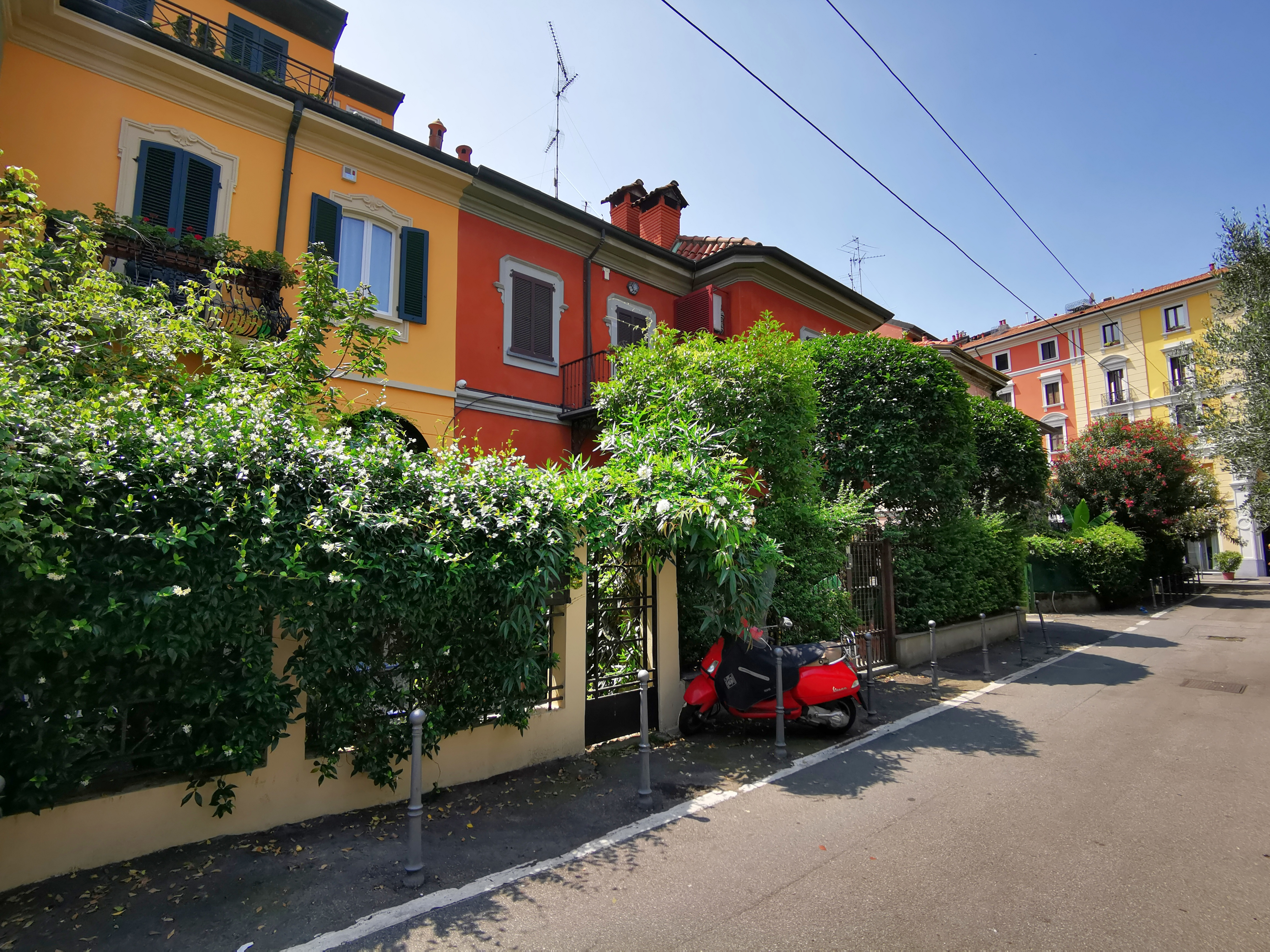
Via Lincoln, also known as The Rainbow Borough for its colourful houses

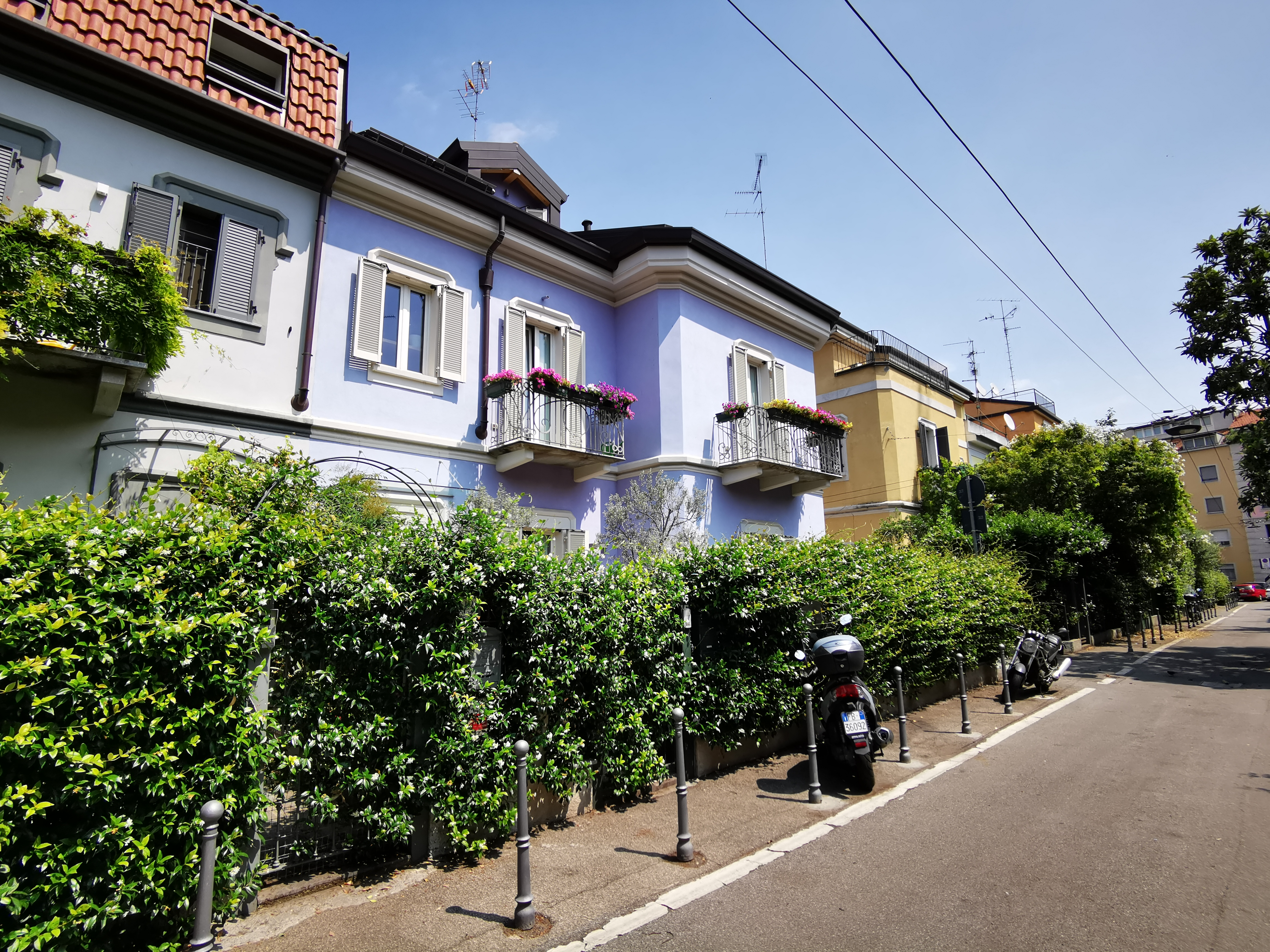
Via Lincoln

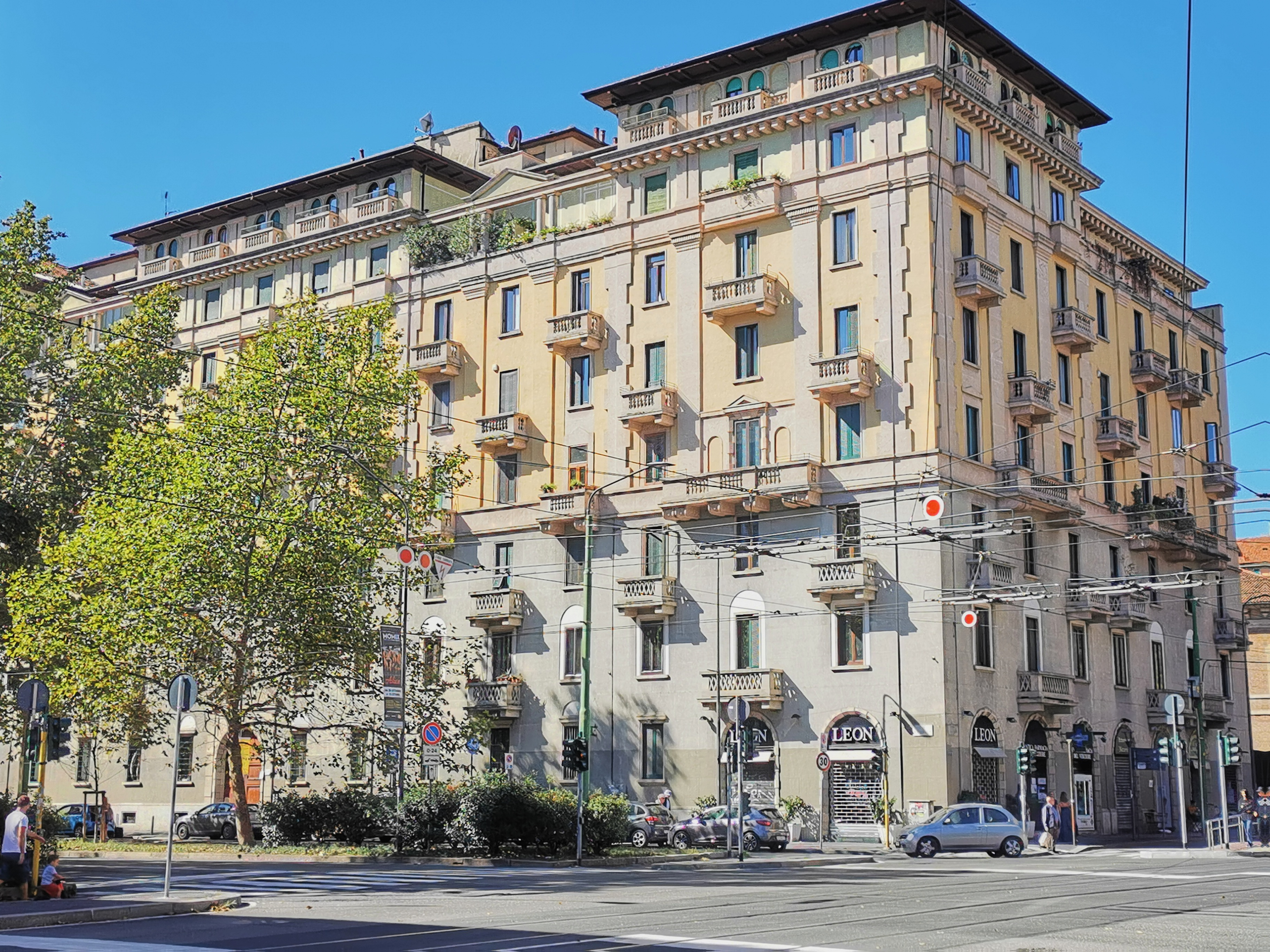
Viale Mugello

== Maps ==
Map of Milan Zone 4
