= Rogoredo =

Coordinates: 45°25′54″N 9°14′41″E

- Quartiere of Milan
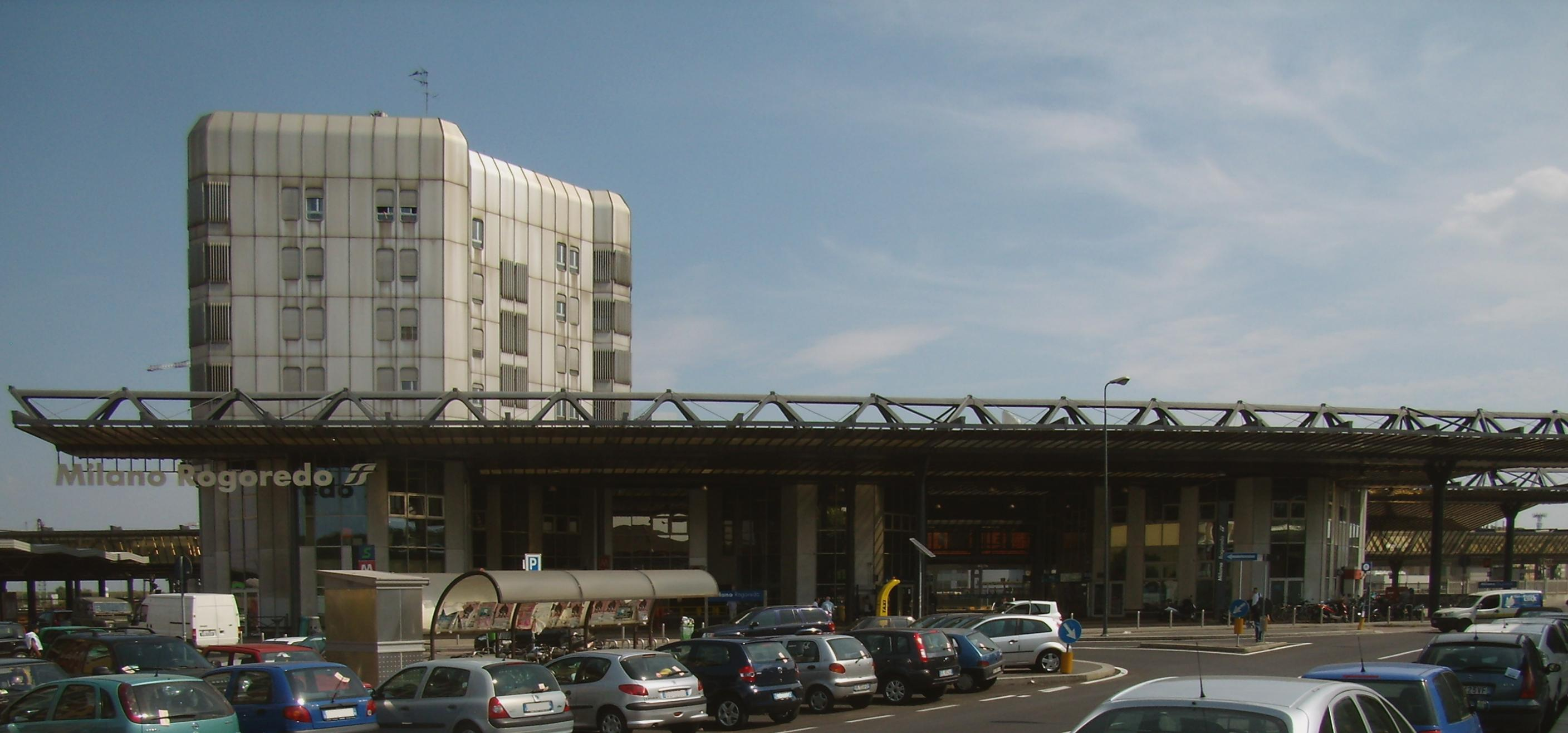
- Milano Rogoredo railway station
- Interactive map of Rogoredo
- Country: Italy
- Region: Lombardy
- Province: Milan
- Comune: Milan
- Zone: 4
- Time zone: UTC+1 (CET)
  - Summer (DST): UTC+2 (CEST)

Rogoredo (Rogored in Lombard) is a former municipality, currently border district ("quartiere") of the city of Milan, Italy. It is part of the Zone 4 administrative division, and it is located 6–7 km south-east of the city centre. It borders on the Nosedo district to the east, on the Morsenchio district to the north, on the piazzale Corvetto neighbourhood to the north-west, and on the San Donato Milanese comune to the south-east. The name derives from the medieval Latin word robur, meaning "sessile oak, and stands for "oak wood".

== History ==
References to Rogoredo as a distinct settlement, traversed by the Via Aemilia Roman road, date back at least to 880. Once part of the parish of Nosedo, in 1867 it became part of the Chiaravalle Milanese comune. It became part of Milan in 1923, along with 20 other Milanese comunes.

At the end of the 19th century, the development Rogoredo benefited from its connections to Milan, through the Porta Romana city gate and by the Milano-Lodi tramway. At the time, the settlement went through a fast industrialization process, most notably with the establishment of the Acciaierie Redaelli steel mill and the explosive material factory Società Italiana Prodotti Esplosivi, later absorbed by Montedison. With the establishment of these facilities, the population grew quickly. In the 20th century, industrial activities in the area were further boosted by the realization of the Rogoredo railway station, located on the railway connecting Milan to Pavia and Piacenza, as well as the largest freight yard of the Milanese area. Public transports to Rogoredo were likewise enhanced through the century, with the old tramway being gradually replaced by trolleybuses and then buses, and lastly complemented by the Milan Metro subway (Line 3). The subway station serving the district is "San Donato", which, despite its name, is within the boundaries of Rogoredo rather than those of the nearby San Donato Milanese.

== The district today ==
Up until the 1980s, when the Milan Metro station in Rogoredo was realized, the district was largely isolated from the rest of Milan. The subway increased activity in the area, especially as the Rogoredo station absorbed much of the commuting between Milan and the southern part of the Province (Pavia, Piacenza, Lodi, Voghera). This was further increased in the late 20th century and early 21st century as both the Milan Passerby Railway and the high-speed rail reached Rogoredo.

Despite this, Rogoredo is still somewhat perceived as a town of its own, and there still is a single road leading into the district from Milan. Plans to enhance the road connections between Rogoredo and Milan are being considered by the city authorities.

The district has a large city park, established in the 1960s, with a war memorial dedicated to the soldiers that fell in World War I and World War II. At the northern end of the park, some 16th-century cascine have been preserved.

The industrial history of Rogoredo is reflected in its high level of development. For example, Rogoredo was the first district in Milan to have full optical fiber Internet access. Sky Italia, the first satellite television provider in Italy, is based in Rogoredo.

== Milano Santa Giulia ==
A project has been started that will create a new residential and green district in the area where the Montedison and Redaelli facilities used to be. This area, which includes the headquarters of Sky Italia, will thus cease to be part of Rogoredo and become a district on its own, named Milano Santa Giulia. As only part of the new district has been realized, this area is still usually referred to as being part of Rogoredo.

== References in popular culture ==
The best known reference to Rogoredo in popular culture is probably the song Andava a Rogoredo ("He used to go to Rogoredo") by Milanese singer-songwriter Enzo Jannacci (1962).
