= Nosedo =

Coordinates: 45°25′53″N 9°13′29″E

- Quartiere of Milan
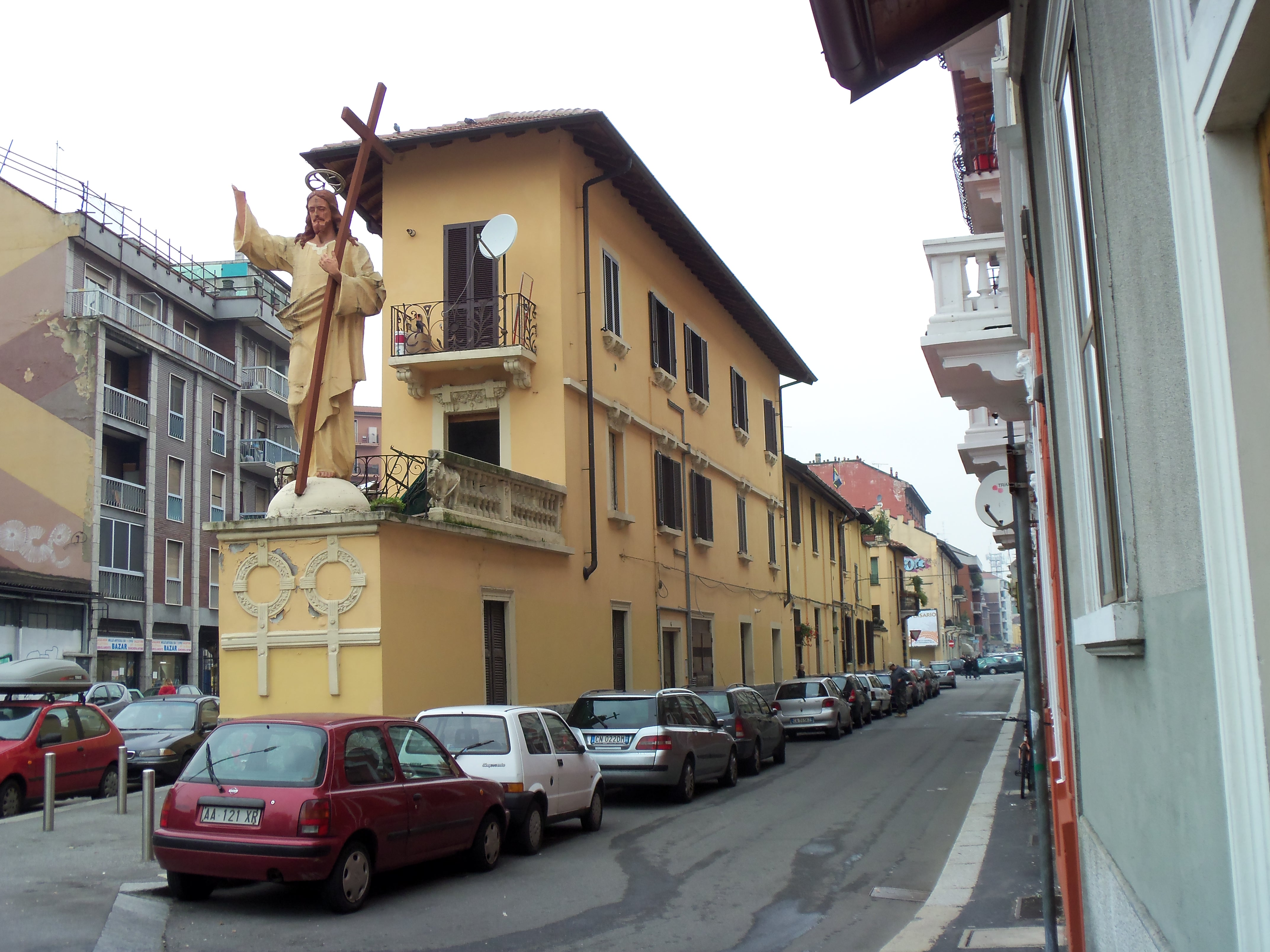
- The "Christ Blessing" of Nosedo
- Interactive map of Nosedo
- Country: Italy
- Region: Lombardy
- Province: Milan
- Comune: Milan
- Zone: 4
- Time zone: UTC+1 (CET)
  - Summer (DST): UTC+2 (CEST)

Nosedo (Nosed in Lombard) is a district ("quartiere") of the city of Milan, Italy. It is part of the Zone 4 administrative division, located south of the city centre. Until 1870, it was an autonomous comune. The name comes from the Latin nocetum, meaning "walnut forest", as walnut trees used to be common in the area.

== History ==
A settlement has been reported to exist in Nosedo since the Middle Ages, when the Goths controlled the Milanese. It is reported that Milanese bishop Onorato was buried in a church of the area in 569, and that the local population tried to seek shelter from the Goths in a church called "San Giorgio al Pozzo" (Saint George by the Pit).

The oldest reference to the name "Nosedo" (then Nosea) is found in a document dating back to 1346. When the territory around Milan was partitioned in "pieves", Nosedo was part of the Pieve di San Donato.

During Napoleonic rule (1806–1816), Nosedo was annexed to Milan, to return to its autonomy when the Kingdom of Lombardy–Venetia was founded.

In 1816, when Italy was unified, Nosedo had 393 inhabitants.

In 1870, Nosedo was merged with Chiaravalle Milanese, which in turn was annexed to Milan in 1923.

== Nosedo today ==
Nosedo is an outlying district, which has partially kept its rural character. It still has several cascine (i.e., farmhouses), some of which abandoned. Some of these cascine have been illegally occupied by homeless and Romani nomads, and friction between these and the local population has occurred, especially between 2006 and 2008.

In 2003, a large water purification facility (one of the largest in Europe) has been established in Nosedo.

== Landmarks ==
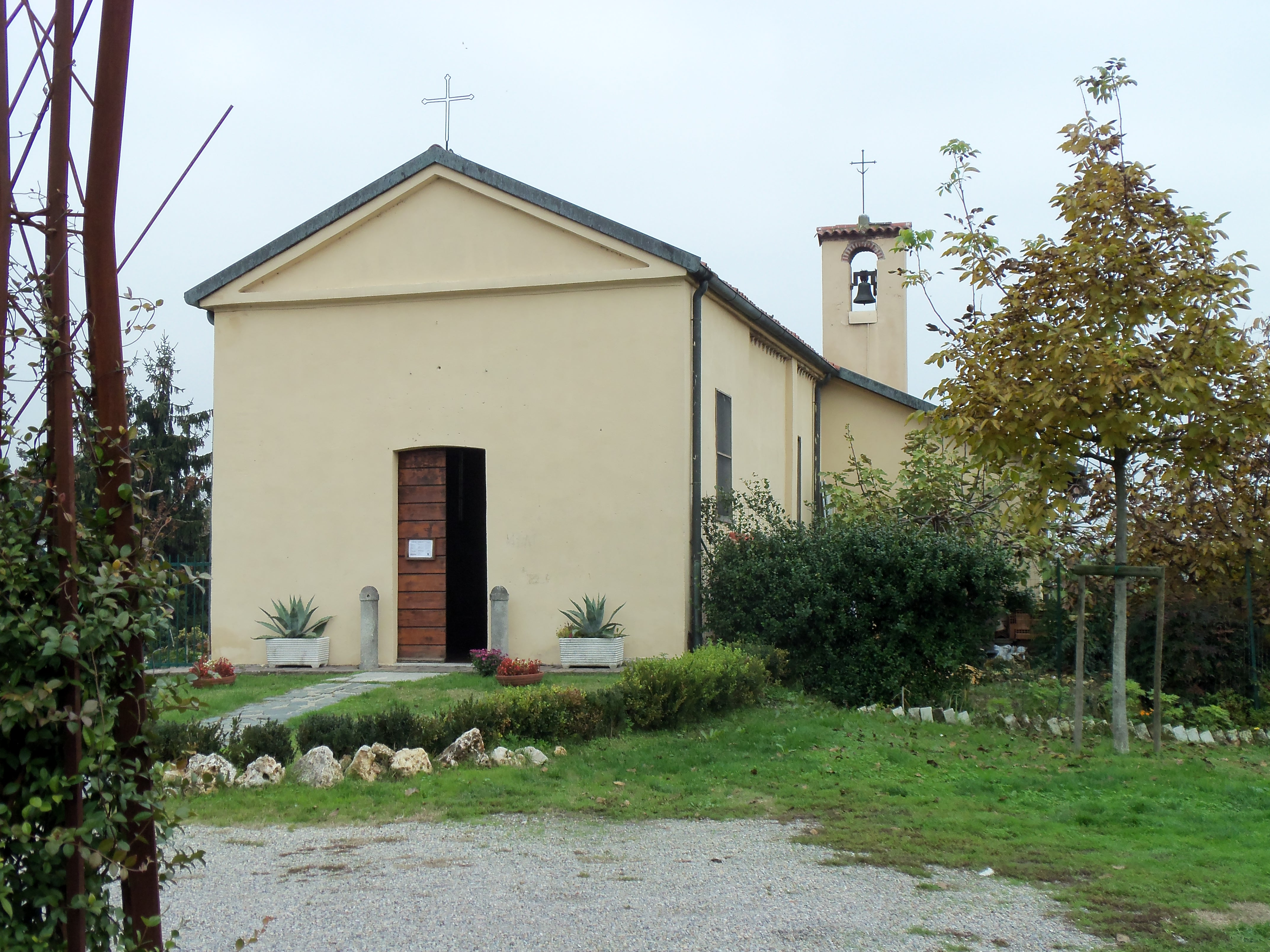
The 13th century chapel

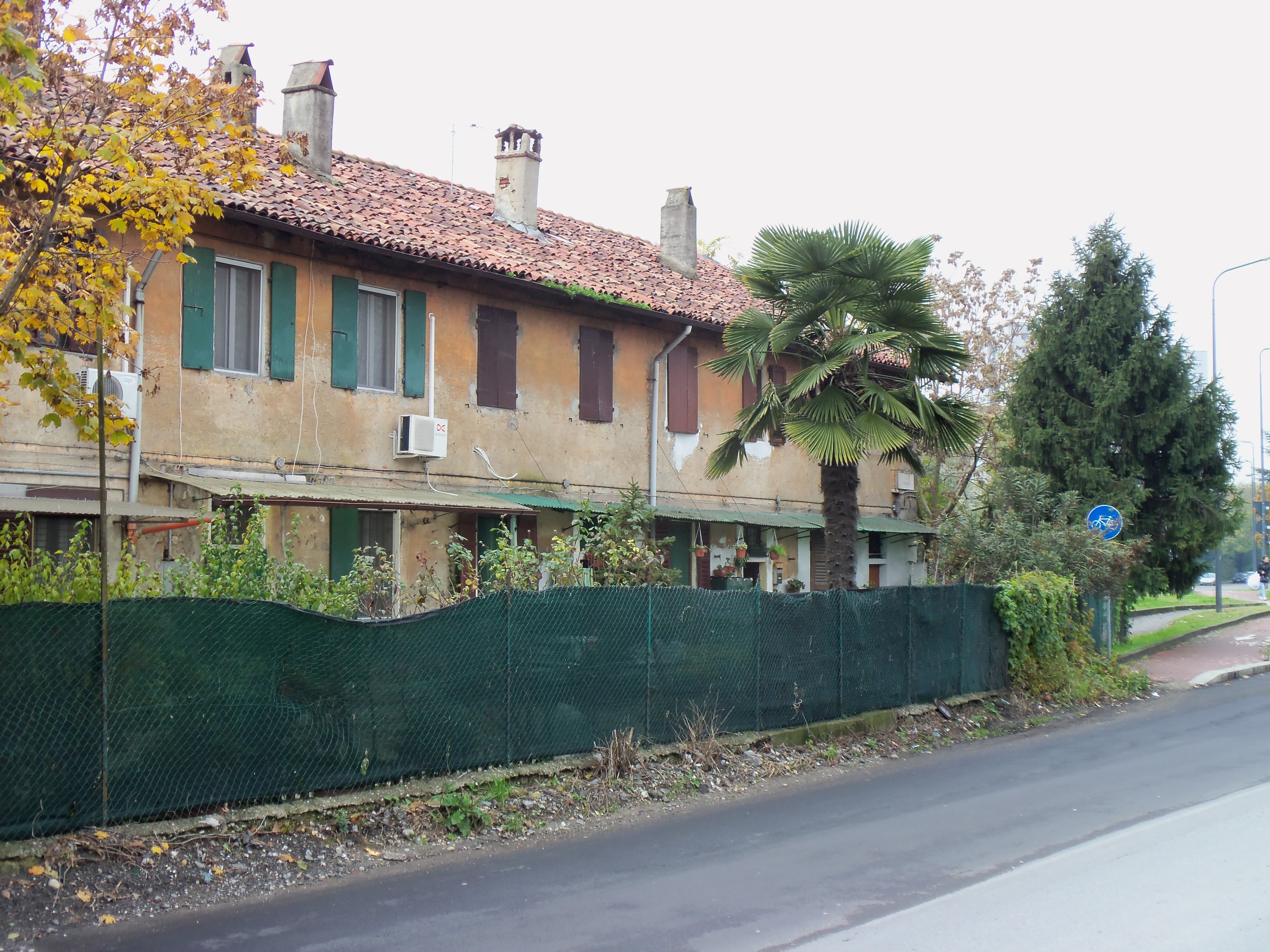
Cascina Nosedo

The main landmark of Nosedo is an old cascina with a 13th chapel, located in Via San Dionigi, 77. The church was built by the Cistercians coming from the nearby Chiaravalle Abbey, on the ruins of an oldest church. The church was named after Saints Philip and James.

In the following centuries, the church fell in decay, to the point of being used as a warehouse, but later returned to its original functions. In 1825, the wedding of Ferdinand I of the Two Sicilies and Isabella was celebrated in the chapel.

The chapel was restored in 1985. In 1998, an association was founded with the mission of preserving the church and the cascina and, in general, the historical and religious tradition of Nosedo.
