= Milano Santa Giulia =

Coordinates: 45°26′6.24″N 9°14′27.15″E

- Quartiere of Milan
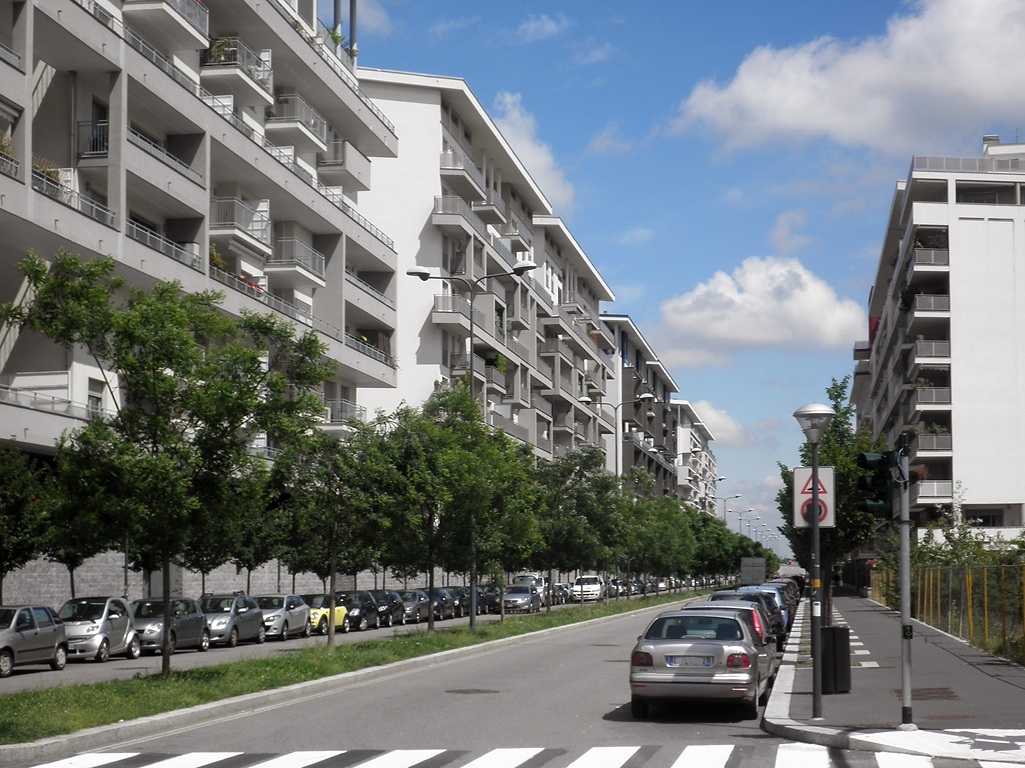
- Interactive map of Milano Santa Giulia
- Country: Italy
- Region: Lombardy
- Province: Milan
- Comune: Milan
- Zone: 4
- Time zone: UTC+1 (CET)
  - Summer (DST): UTC+2 (CEST)

Milano Santa Giulia is a green and residential district ("quartiere") under construction located in the south-east of Milan, Italy, between the districts of Rogoredo and Taliedo, in the Zone 4 administrative division. As the construction is still in progress, the district is not formally recognized as such, and its area is still referred to as being part of Rogoredo and Taliedo.

The area where Milano Santa Giulia is being built is a 296 acres (1.20 km^{2}) wide former industrial zone, where Montedison and Acciaierie Redaelli facilities used to be. For this reason, the district is also nicknamed Montecity, after Montedison.

The leading architect of the Milano Santa Giulia project is Norman Foster (UK), and the developer is Risanamento.

== The plan ==
According to the initial plan, the district will have two main areas, respectively where Montedison and Redaelli facilities used to be; they will be divided by a large city park, traversed by the Paullese, a major thoroughfare connecting Milan to Paullo.

The ex-Montedison area (bordering on Taliedo) is intended to become been a luxury residential area, with a prestigious shopping mall (nicknamed "Montecity Avenue"), congress facilities, and a church designed by Peter Zumthor.

The district will accommodate up to 60,000 residents and comprise retail stores as well as leisure areas. Hotels, offices, a conference center, a school, and a church are planned, surrounding a large central green area. Public art in the area has been commissioned to sculptor Anish Kapoor.

The district will be connected to Milan by the Paullese as well as the Tangenziale Est ring road. The nearby Rogoredo railway station, and Milan Metro station, will also serve the new district. The development of a tramway from the railway station across the whole district, connecting to the existing tracks in the neighbourhood of Morsenchio, is also part of the plan.

== Current situation ==
Construction in the ex-Montedison area has experienced both financial and legal problems, and has been suspended. In 2010, the authorities have confiscated the area on the basis that the groundwater is polluted, an issue that is still being debated, with the Milan Metro trustees upholding that the drinking water aquifers are safe.

In the ex-Redaelli area, bordering on the Rogoredo district, residential and office buildings have been constructed, including the headquarters of the Sky Italia satellite television provider.

== See also ==
- Rogoredo
