= Forlanini (district of Milan) =

Coordinates: 45°27′31″N 9°14′43″E

- Quartiere of Milan
- Interactive map of Forlanini
- Country: Italy
- Region: Lombardy
- Province: Milan
- Comune: Milan
- Zone: 4
- Time zone: UTC+1 (CET)
  - Summer (DST): UTC+2 (CEST)

Forlanini is a district ("quartiere") of Milan, Italy. It is part of the Zone 4 administrative division, located east of the city centre.

The northern boundary of the district is eponymous Viale Enrico Forlanini, which is the main avenue connecting Milan to the Linate Airport. The other boundaries of the Forlanini district are the Milan belt railway and the Tangenziale Est ring road.

Forlanini is a residential district, with 1960s apartment blocks being the most common type of buildings. Piazza Artigianato, in the center of Forlanini, has been the subject of an environmental case study.

Via Mecenate, leading south towards Ponte Lambro, is one of the largest and most important streets in the district.

Milan Metro Linea 4 was extended in 2022 to 2024, with a new metro station in Forlanini, connected to the Milano Forlanini railway station, a suburban rail line that opened in 2015, and is served by the core Passante Ferroviario di Milano.
