= Corpi Santi di Milano =

Former Italian comune

Corpi Santi di Milano ("Holy Bodies of Milan") is a former Italian comune, established in 1782 and annexed to Milan in 1873. It comprised the rural territory around the city walls of Milan. It was originally known just as Corpi Santi; "di Milano" was added in 1859, possibly to avoid confusion with the comune with the same name located in the area of Pavia.

== The name ==
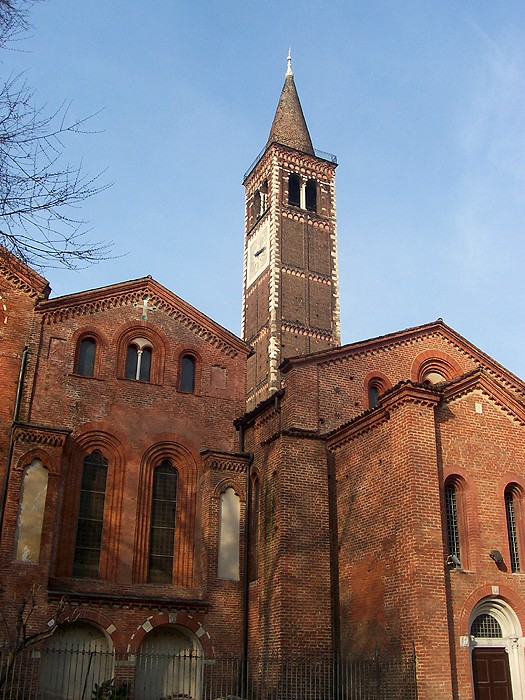
The Basilica of Sant'Eustorgio, now part of the Porta Ticinese district of Milan, formerly in Corpi Santi; according to the legend, it was built to preserve the bodies of the Magi

Scholars have proposed a few different explanation of the toponymy "Corpi Santi", which literally means "Holy Bodies". One explanation is linked to a medieval legend, whereby the corpses of the Magi were sent to Milan in 1034. When the wagon carrying them reached the city walls, it miraculously stuck, and any further attempt to bring the bodies into the city failed. The bishop of Milan thus commanded that the bodies be buried outside of the walls, in the exact place where the wagon had stopped; the Basilica of Sant'Eustorgio was built in that place to guard the relics, and the place would thereafter be known as "the place of the Holy Bodies".

A more mundane explanation for the toponymy is that, during Austrian rule, sanitary laws were enforced whereby the Milanese would have to bury their dead outside the city walls. As a consequence, most cemeteries of the time would be built in the surrounding area (i.e., the Corpi Santi).

== History ==
The establishment of the comune of Corpi Santi di Milano was decided by Empress Maria Theresa in 1757 and actuated by her son Joseph II in 1782. The comune was briefly annexed to Milan during Napoleonic rule, but regained its autonomy with the Kingdom of Lombardy–Venetia; it was annexed to Milan again in 1873.

Corpi Santi had an area of about 66 km^{2} and it was roughly ring-shaped, centered on Milan, and extending for 6–7 km from the city walls outwards.

The rural area outside the walls of Milan, comprising the Corpi Santi comune, was rich of water (traversed by the Navigli canals, as well as a number of rivers including Olona, Lambro, and Seveso) and rural settlements such as cascine (farms) and borghi (small towns). Its economy of course depended on Milan; being so close to the city walls, farmers in Corpi Santi could dedicate to cultivating perishable but profitable vegetables such as onion, cabbage, fruit. Goods brought to Milan from Corpi Santi were not subject to duty taxes.

In the 20th century, most of the territory of the Corpi Santi comune was absorbed into the urban agglomerate of Milan. Rural towns became districts; modern districts that developed from borghi of Corpi Santi include, for example, Barona, Gratosoglio, Ghisolfa, Bovisa, Calvairate, Tre Ronchetti, Monluè, Lorenteggio, Lampugnano, and Cimiano. Most cascine were either demolished or adapted for other functions, such as schools, restaurants, or government buildings.
