= St. Peter Stiftskulinarium =

Restaurant in Austria

Coordinates: 47.797319°N 13.044516°E

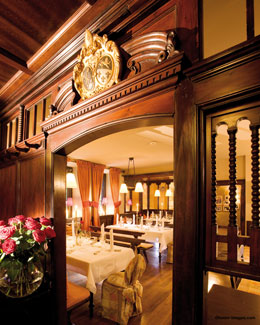
A room in St. Peter Stiftskulinarium

St. Peter Stiftskulinarium (German pronunciation: [ˈʃtɪftskuliˌnaːʁiʊm], until 2017 Stiftskeller St. Peter) is a restaurant within the St Peter's Abbey in Salzburg, Austria. It is speculated to have been operating since before 803 AD, making it the oldest inn in Central Europe and the oldest currently operating restaurant in the world, as well as the longest running company founded outside Japan.

== History ==
The earliest recorded mention of St. Peter Stiftskulinarium was in a letter to Charlemagne written in 803 AD. Local legend states that Christopher Columbus, Johann Georg Faust, and Wolfgang Amadeus Mozart ate at the restaurant. In its early history, the restaurant gave food for free to religious pilgrims. French soldiers were given quarters in the inn during the Napoleonic Wars. In modern times it has served political figures such as Bill Clinton, Alexander Van der Bellen, and other European leaders.

As the restaurant has closed a few times throughout its history, it is not the oldest continuously-operating restaurant in the world; that was Sobrino de Botín in Spain, which had operated since 1725 prior to closing temporarily during COVID.

== Food ==
St. Peter Stiftskulinarium serves a combination of traditional Austrian cuisine and modern culinary styles. It serves various wines and local Austrian beers. The restaurant is particularly well known for its Salzburger Nockerl, a fluffy dessert dish served with lingonberry cream. The restaurant also hosts Mozart dinner concerts multiple nights per week.

== See also ==
- List of oldest companies
- Antica trattoria Bagutto
