= Calvairate =

Coordinates: 45°27′18″N 9°13′21″E

Calvairate Calvairaa (Lombard)
- Quartier of Milan
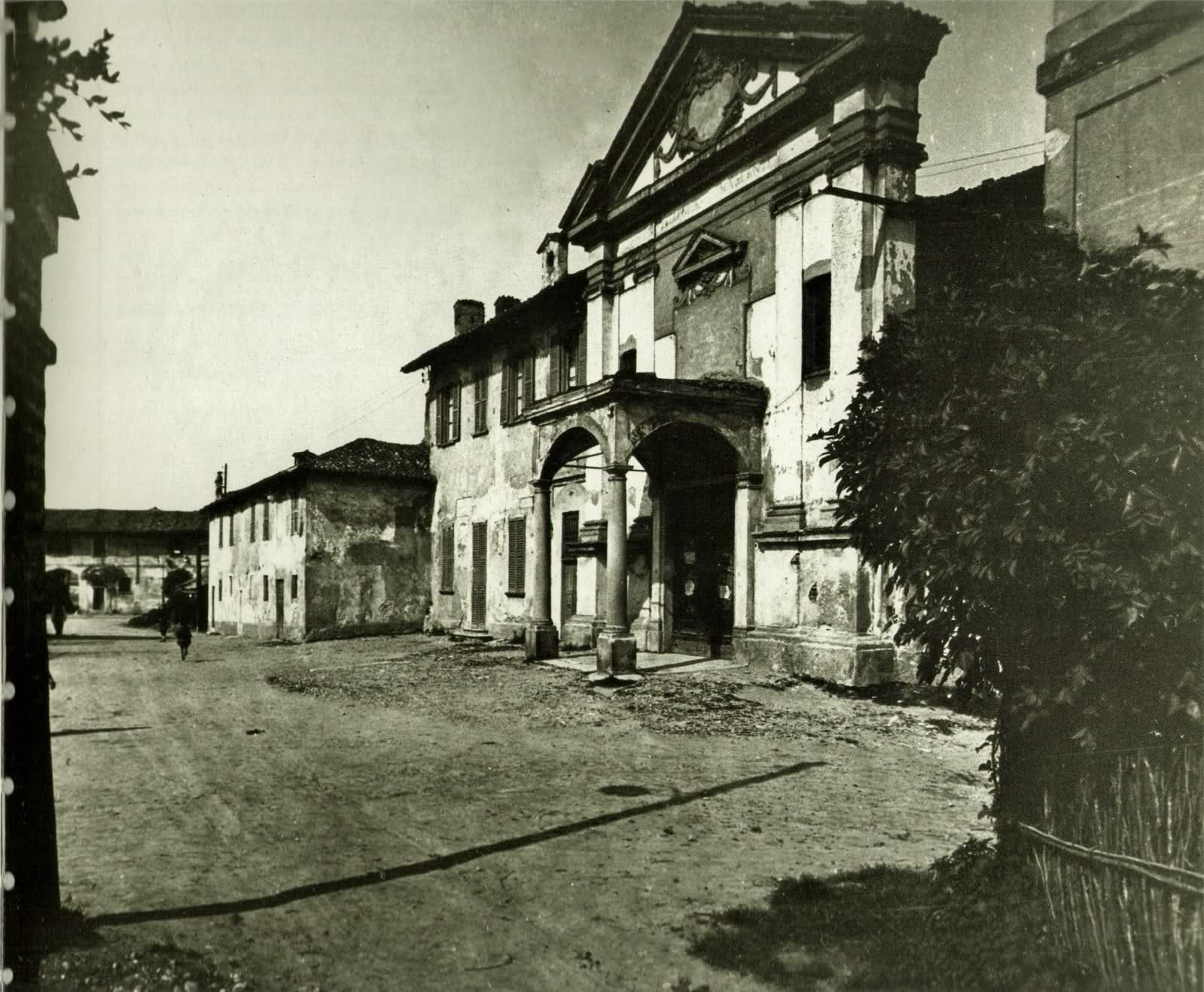
- Calvairate between 1890 and 1900
- Interactive map of Calvairate
- Country: Italy
- Region: Lombardy
- Province: Milan
- Comune: Milan
- Zone: 4
- Time zone: UTC+1 (CET)
  - Summer (DST): UTC+2 (CEST)

Calvairate (Lombard: Calvairaa [kalʋai̯ˈraː]) is a district (quartiere) of Milan, Italy. It is part of the Zone 4 administrative division, located east of the city centre.

A small rural settlement (borgo) in the area of Calvairate is reported at least from the 16th century. The centre of the settlement was located in what is now Piazzale Martini. In the 19th century the borgo, which was then part of the comune of Corpi Santi, quickly developed, and was annexed to Milan in 1873.

The area of Calvairate changed from a rural to an urban district in the 1910s, when the first apartment blocks were built in the area. Nowadays, Calvairate is a residential district, albeit large green areas have been preserved.
