= Gratosoglio =

Coordinates: 45°24′31″N 9°10′18″E

Gratosoglio Grattasoeuj (Lombard)
- Quartiere of Milan
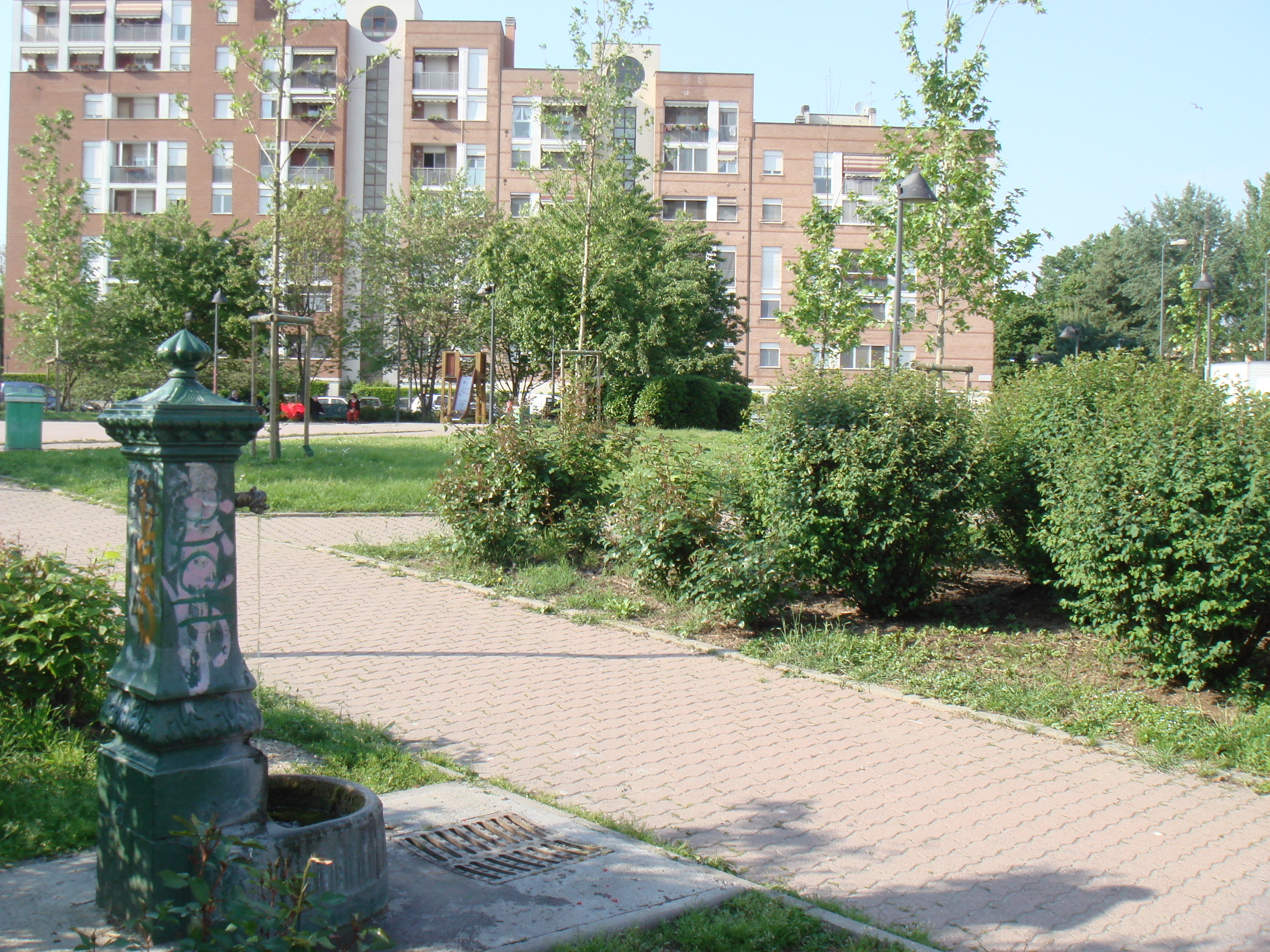
- Apartment blocks in Gratosoglio
- Interactive map of Gratosoglio
- Country: Italy
- Region: Lombardy
- Province: Milan
- Comune: Milan
- Zone: 5
- Time zone: UTC+1 (CET)
  - Summer (DST): UTC+2 (CEST)

Gratosoglio (Italian: [ɡratoˈsɔʎʎo]; Milanese: Grattasoeuj [ɡrataˈsøj]) is a district (quartiere) of the city of Milan, Italy, part of the Zone 5 administrative division. It is located at southernmost end of the city, bordering on the comune of Rozzano, and it is traversed by the Lambro river.

The district has an area of about 400,000 m^{2}, centered on the main thoroughfare Via dei Missaglia. Having started as a commuter town in the 1960s, with large prefabricated apartment blocks destined to house immigrant workers coming from the South of Italy, the district is usually listed among those most degraded (e.g., having the highest crime rates) in the surroundings of Milan.

The name Gratosoglio is derived from the Latin words gratum solium "agreeable throne", which apostle Barnabas (founder of the Milanese church), according to a local legend, pronounced when he was about to leave Milan.

== History ==
Gratosoglio developed from a Benedictine monastery that was founded between 1107 and 1130 on the road connecting Milan to Pavia. Despite being a very little community (less than a dozen monks), the monastery became very wealthy, and for about three centuries it also actively influenced the city of Milan. In the mid 15th century the community fell in decay, and by 1545 the monastery was abandoned by the Benedictine. Both Carmelites and Franciscans would later be sent to officiate in the monastery's church and would thus inhabit the monastery.

The local rural community survived the decay of the monastery, and in the 18th century was annexed to the Corpi Santi comune.

The area was urbanized in the early 1960s, in response to the increasing demand of low price residential areas caused by immigration from Southern Italy. Between 1962 and 1965, over 50 large buildings (9 to 16 floors high) were constructed, largely using prefabricated blocks. Gratosoglio thus earned its fame of a degraded and marginal dormitory district.
