= Ponte Lambro (district of Milan) =

Coordinates: 45°26′35″N 9°15′51″E

- Quartier of Milan
- Interactive map of Ponte Lambro
- Country: Italy
- Region: Lombardy
- Province: Milan
- Comune: Milan
- Zone: 4
- Time zone: UTC+1 (CET)
  - Summer (DST): UTC+2 (CEST)

Ponte Lambro (literally, "Lambro Bridge") is a district ("quartiere") of Milan, Italy. It is the outermost part of the Zone 4 administrative division, extending south-east of the city centre.

Parco Lambro is a border district, located past the Tangenziale (ring road) which encircles most of the city. To the east, it borders on Peschiera Borromeo (the border itself being marked by the eponymous Lambro river); to the south, it borders on San Donato Milanese. Ponte Lambro is home to the oldest restaurant in Italy and the second in Europe, the Antica trattoria Bagutto, which has existed since at least 1284.

The "Monzino", a renowned cardiology hospital which is also a seat of the Medicine Faculty of the University of Milan, is based in Ponte Lambro. Apart from that, the district is mostly infamous, because of its long history of urban decay and social issues, including the highest unemployment rate of the Milanese area. In the early 2000s, a renewal and development plan for the area was outlined, with the involvement of architect Renzo Piano, but it was later abandoned. New plans for Ponte Lambro, including the realization of a college campus and a wide city park, have been proposed again in 2008.
