= Chiaravalle Abbey =

Cistercian monastic complex in Milan, Italy

Coordinates: 45.4171°N 9.24098°E

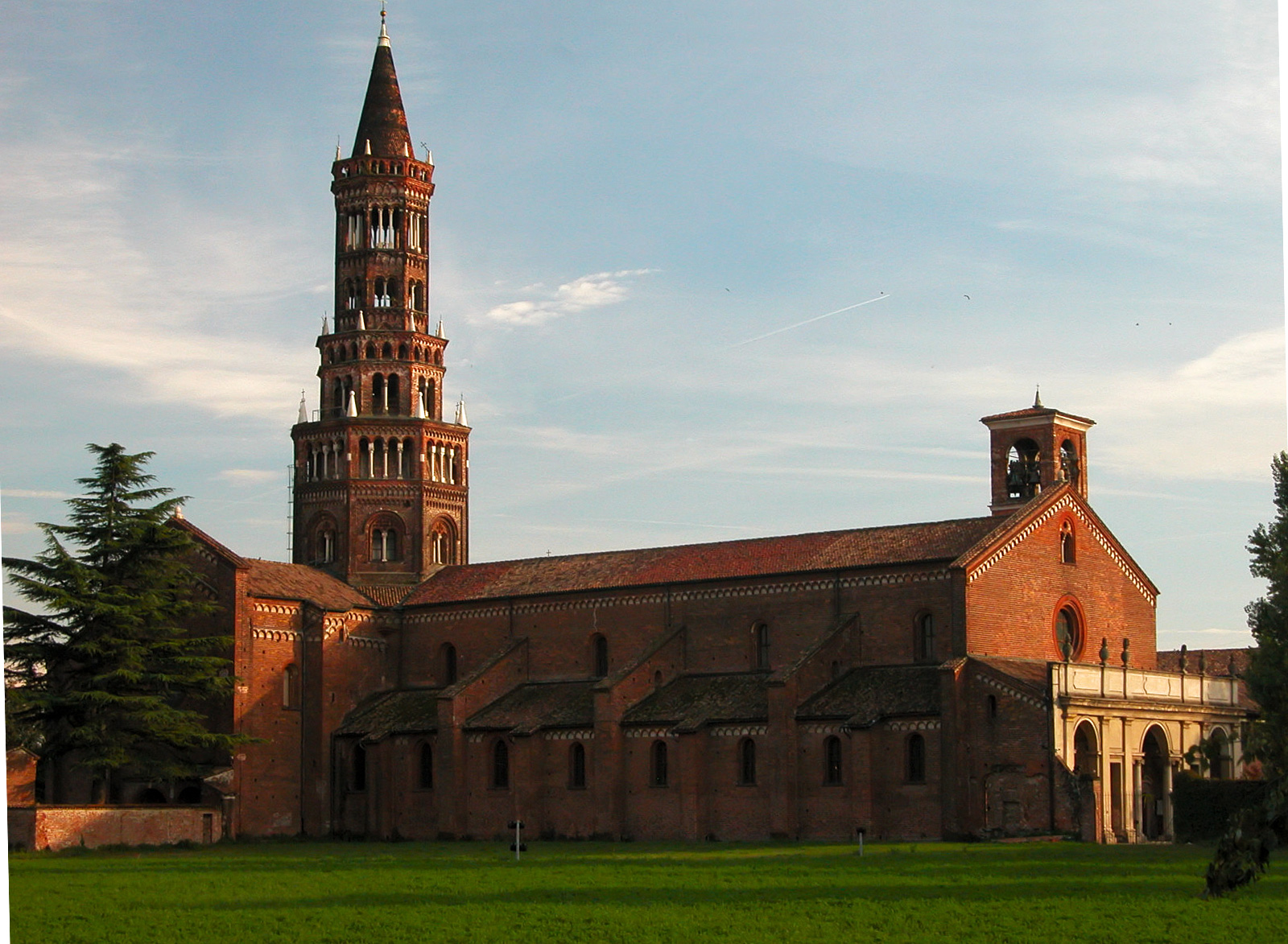
The abbey church

The Abbey of Santa Maria di Rovegnano (Latin: Sanctæ Mariæ Clarævallis Mediolanensis) is a Cistercian monastic complex in the comune of Milan, Lombardy, northern Italy. The borgo that has developed round the abbey was once an independent commune called Chiaravalle Milanese, now included in Milan and referred to as the Chiaravalle district.

The abbey was founded on 22 January 1135 as a daughter house of Clairvaux; it is one of the first examples of Gothic architecture in Italy, although maintaining some late Romanesque influences.

== History ==
In October 1134 Cistercian monks from Morimond, near Dijon established themselves at Coronate, near Pieve di Abbiategrasso southwest of Milan, and founded the new Morimondo Abbey, whence the location was given, in 1171, the name of Morimondo. At the start of 1135 another group of Cistercians, coming from Clairvaux Abbey and headed by its first abbot and founder, Bernard of Clairvaux, reached Milan as guests of the Benedictines of Sant'Ambrogio, Milan, to support the cause of Pope Innocent II against Antipope Anacletus II. The papal dispute was resolved in favour of the former, thanks to the intervention of Bernard of Clairvaux. Offered land to found a monastery on, he decided to reclaim the marshy area south of Milan and found a new abbey there; he left a group of monks in the city with the task of collecting money for the construction of the new monastery, Ciaravalle Abbey.

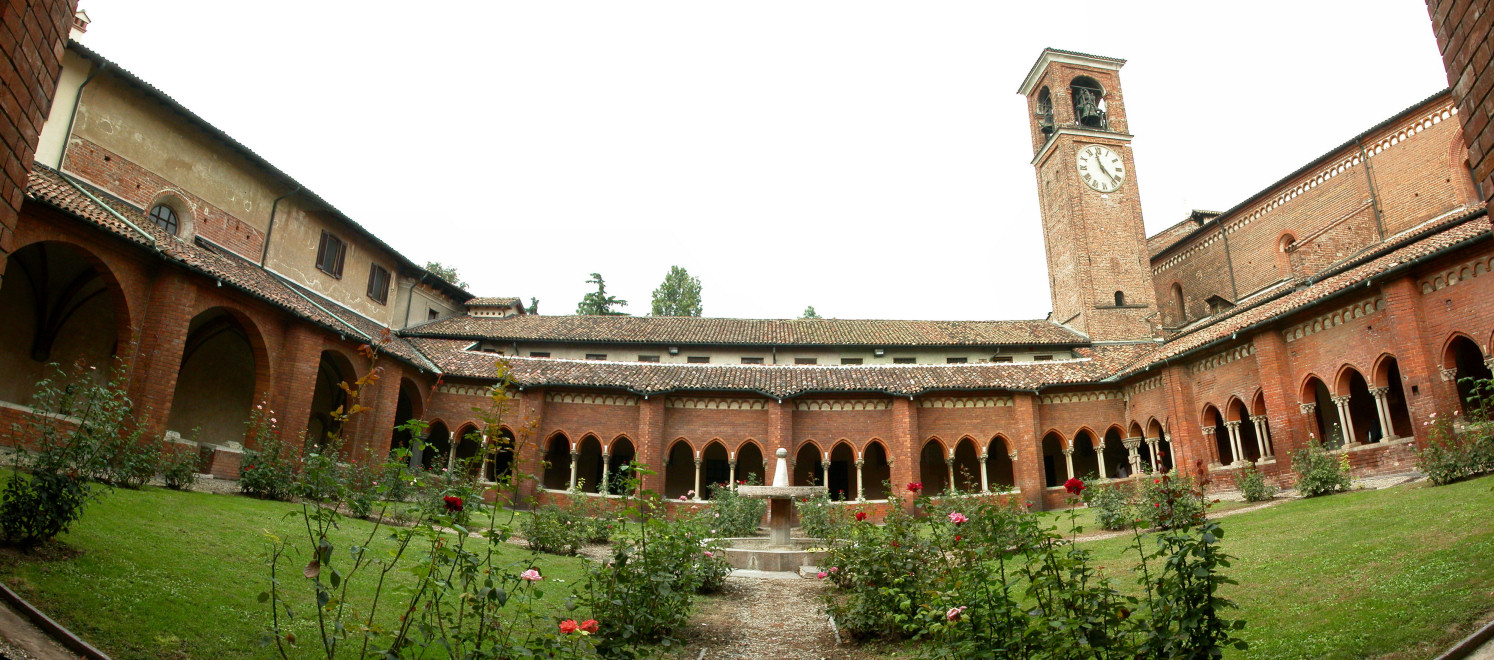
The cloister

After a series of temporary buildings had been constructed, the construction of the permanent church was begun around 1150–1160; it was consecrated on 2 May 1221. Works continued in the 13th century with the first cloister, south of the church, and, in the 14th century, the crossing tower and the refectory. In 1412 a small chapel was built next to the southern transept. Today it is used as the sacristy.

In 1442 the abbey was placed in commendam. In 1490 Cardinal Ascanio Sforza (the brother of Ludovico il Moro, duke of Milan) commissioned Bramante and Giovanni Antonio Amadeo to construct the Chiostro Grande ("large cloister") and the chapterhouse.

During the Renaissance, numerous painters and artists worked in the abbey: to this period belong for example Bernardino Luini's works. From 1614 to 1616 the brothers Giovanni Battista and Giovanni Mauro della Rovere, called "i Fiammenghini", decorated the interior walls of the church with the frescoes which are still visible today.

When the Napoleonic Cisalpine Republic was founded in 1798, the monastery was partly demolished. What remained included the church, part of the small cloister, the refectory and the entrance buildings. In 1861 Bramante's cloister was destroyed to make way for the construction of the Milan-Pavia-Genoa railway. The abbey remained a private property until 1894, while the Cistercians returned in 1952.

The dome's frescoes were restored in 1970–1972; further works of restoration have been in progress since 2004.

== The monastery ==
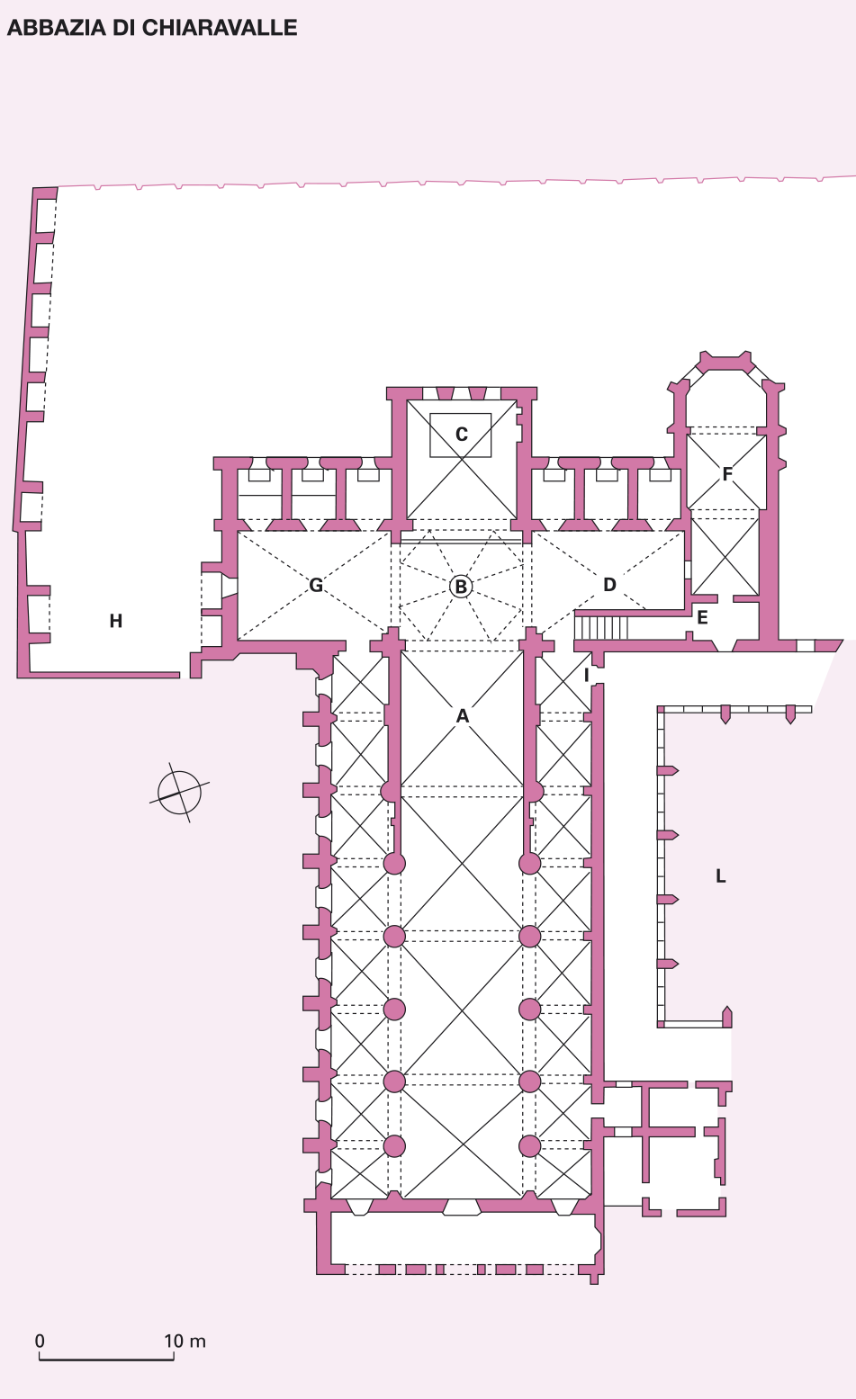
Plan of the main church and of part of the cloister

=== Entrance ===
The complex is accessed through a 16th-century tower commissioned by Louis XII of France; to the side there is an oratory dedicated to Saint Bernard which contains a fresco of Christ standing before Pilate, once attributed to Hieronymus Bosch but today assigned to the Swiss Hans Witz (also known as Johannes Sapidus), who was court painter in Milan during the rule of Galeazzo Maria Sforza.

The wrought iron grill of the entrance is from the late 17th century. Nearby are the only remains of the original line of walls that surrounded the abbey; no traces remain of the ditch.

=== Square ===
In the enclosed square preceding the church's entrance is a small church also entitled to St. Bernard, dating to 1412, later adapted as grocery after the construction of another church (also dedicated to the saint) in 1762. In the older church are traces of frescoes attributed to Callisto Piazza; the other houses the Incoronation of the Virgin with the Saints Benedict and Bernard (1572) by Bernardino Gatti, moved here in 1952 during the restorations of the main church.

=== Church ===
==== Façade ====
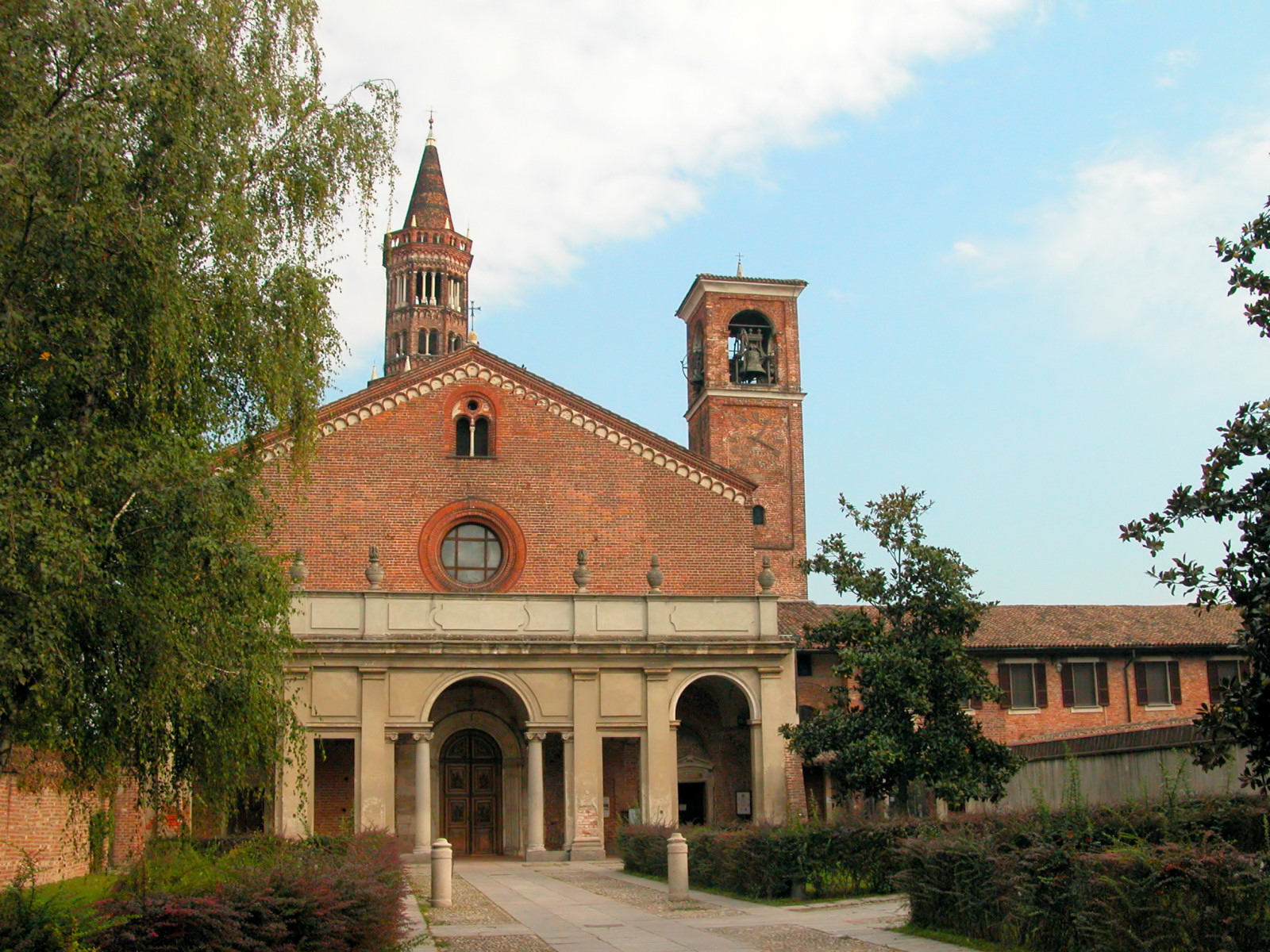
The church's principal façade

The façade of the church dates to prior the 17th-century renovation, as it was restored to its original appearance in 1926. Some elements of the 17th-century structure remain, however, such as the narthex, which replaces the 13th-century one. The traditional façade a capanna, shows the gable end of the nave, flanked by the sloping roofs of the aisles, the frame supported by Lombard bands in terracotta.

Notable is the entrance portal, dating most likely to the early 16th century: it has sculpted figures of Saints Robert, Alberic, Stephen and Bernard, surmounted by the church's coats of arms: a stork with crosier and mitre.

==== Interior ====
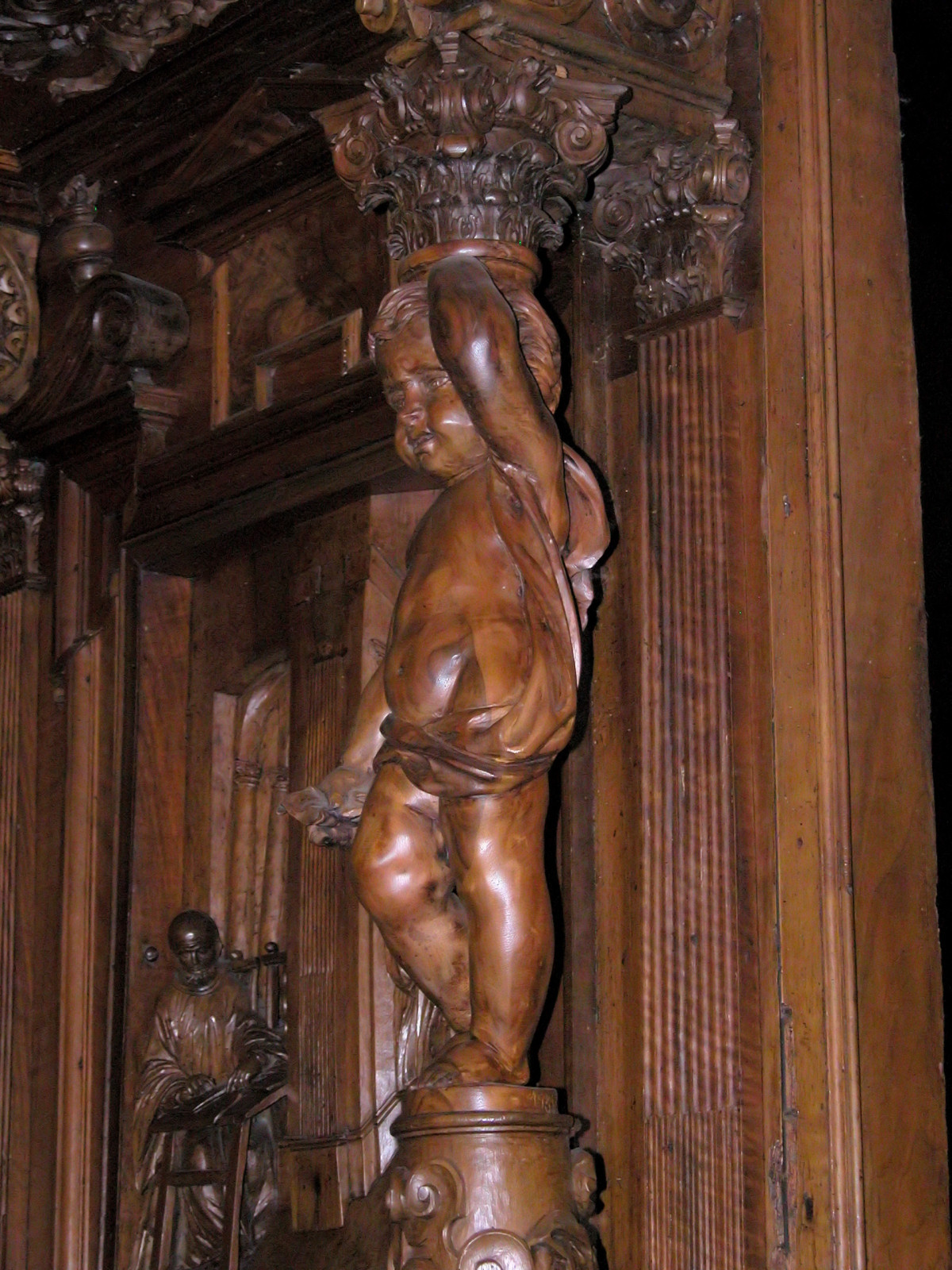
A detail of the wooden choir

The interior is on the Latin cross plan, with a nave and two aisles with cross-vault, divided by small cotto pilasters on the sides; the apse is flat. A fifth bay forms the presbytery, while the transept arms are two rectangular bays, with a crossing dome. The last bays of the nave have square pilasters, supporting the choir.

The rich Baroque frescoes in Chiaravalle are a striking exception to the Cistercian preference for few, if no decorations in their buildings. They were realized in the early 17th century by the brothers Giovan Battista and Giovan Mauro Della Rovere, known as i Fiamminghini.

A notable example of wood carving is the choir, near the walls of the nave, carved by Carlo Garavaglia in 1640–1645.

==== Dome ====
The dome, currently in restoration, was frescoed with figures of the Saints Jerome, Augustine, Gregory and Ambrose, the four Evangelists surmounted by a starry sky. Of them, only St. Mark is currently in good conditions.

Also present are the Scenes from the Life of the Virgin from the Coronation of the Virgin to the Annunciation, all dating from 1345 to 1347 and tentatively assigned to Giotto's school. The drum is decorated with lesser quality saints.

==== Transept ====
The transept is entirely covered by frescoes by the Fiamminghini, who finished their work in 1615. The northern arm is dedicated to the Cistercian martyrs, including also a Holy Trinity. The side door leads to the cemetery.

The south transept paintings are dedicated to the order's saints and bishops: they include: Building of Cîteaux monastery, ovals with the Virgin, St. Benedict and St. Bernard, St. Dominic Abbot, St. Alberic, St. Galganus and St. Victor the monk, a large fresco with the order's family tree and, on the vault, St. Christian, St. Peter of Tarantasia, St. Edmund of Canterbury, St. William of Berry. One of the chapels in the arm once housed Bramante's Christ at the Column, now in the Pinacoteca di Brera.

==== Presbytery ====
The presbytery is the most luminous area in the church. It is formed by the seventh bay of the nave, and includes the high altar. On the side walls are two further Fiamminghini works: Adoration of the Shepherds and the Madonna del Latte.

==== Madonna della Buonanotte ====
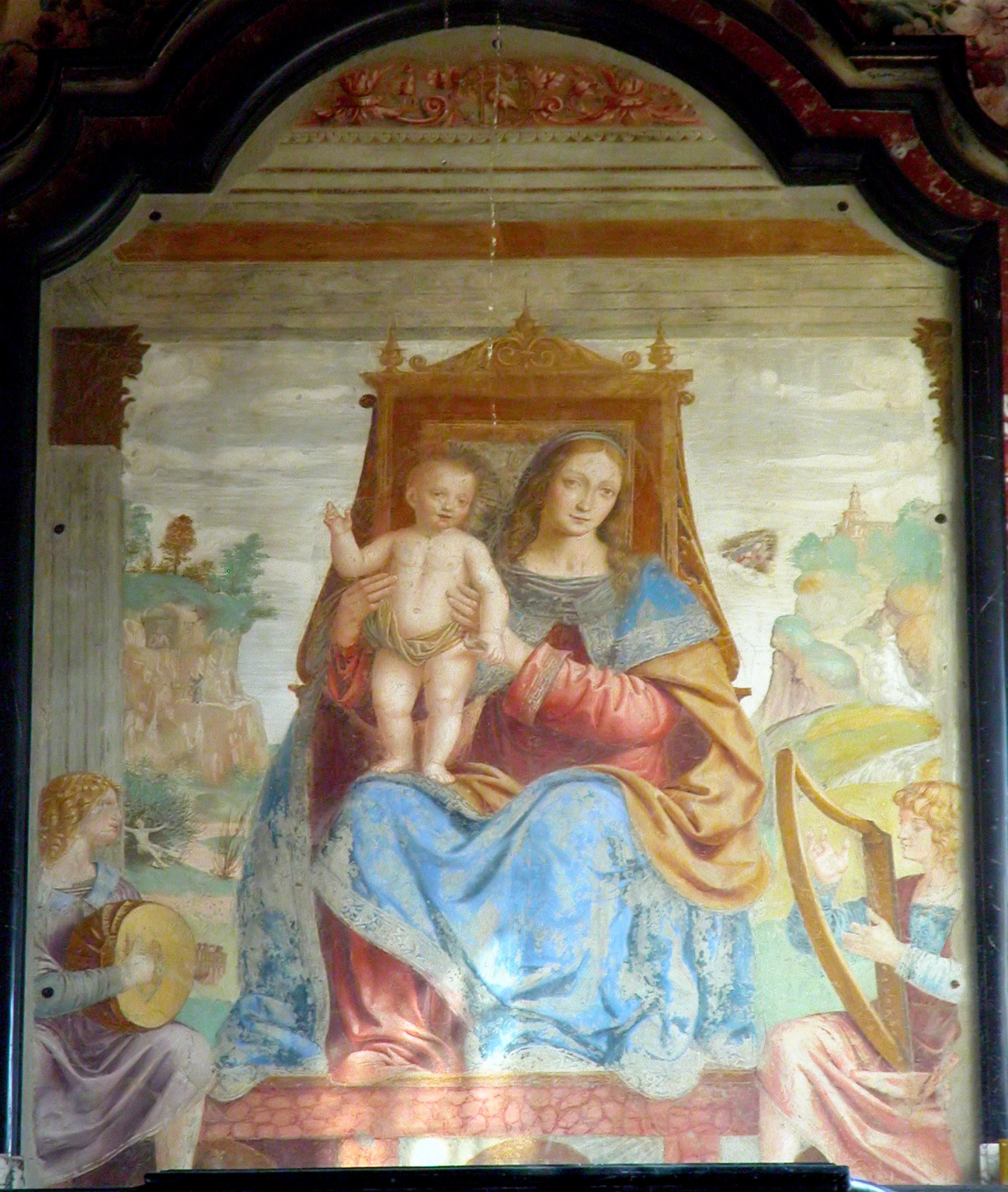
Bernardino Luini's Madonna della Buonanotte

A stair in the southern transept leads to the dormitory, dating to 1493. Here a platform is decorated by one of Bernardino Luini's first works, the Madonna della Buonanotte (1512): the name, meaning "Madonna of Good Night", stems from the monks' habit of greeting the Madonna with the last Ave Maria before sleeping.

==== Sacristy ====
The sacristy was built in 1412, being later enlarged in 1600 and 1708. It has two barrel-vaulted bays, a small semi-octagonal apse and two ogival windows.

Here, until the Cistercians' expulsion in the Napoleonic times, was housed Louis the Pious's cross; it is now in the church of Santa Maria presso San Celso in Milan. Also present are canvases of the Holy Virgin, St. Bernard and Saints, St. Benedicts and others, and the altarpiece by Daniele Crespi.

==== Cloister ====
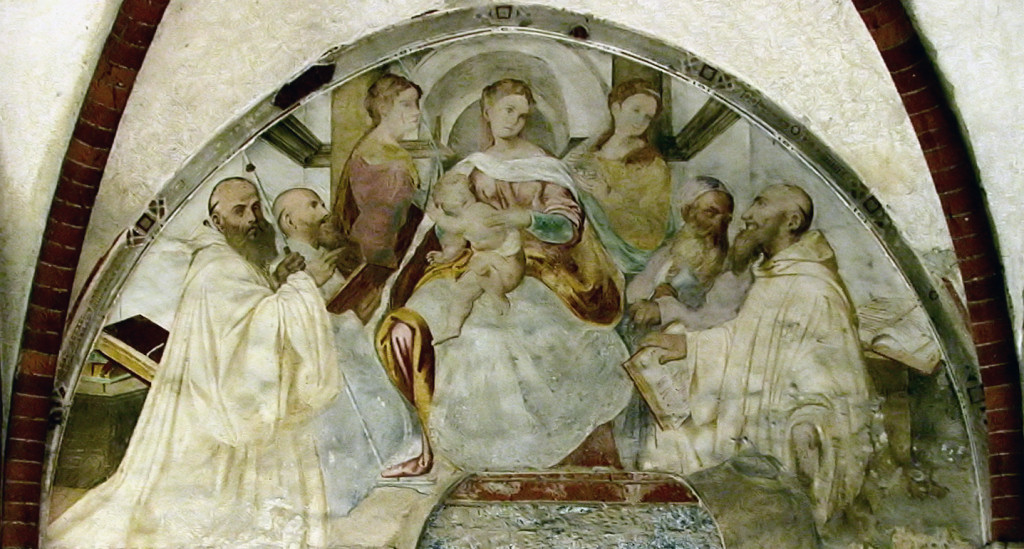
Madonna Enthroned with Child Honored by Cistercians

Of the 13th-century cloister today only the southern side and two bays remain. It is decorated by a Virgin Enthroned with Child Honoured by Cistercians (early 16th-century), once attributed to Gaudenzio Ferrari and today to Callisto Piazza. The fresco is sided by the inscription in semi-Gothic script celebrating the church's consecration in 1221, surmounted by a stork.

Some of the capitals of the small columns show leaves, eagles and human faces.

==== Chapter house ====
The chapter house entrance is located on the eastern side of the cloister. Here are some sgraffiti attributed to Bramante, featuring the city of Milan in the early 16th century.

On the other sides are frescoes by the Fiamminghini with Prophets and Patriarchs. Some bronzo tondi portray Christ at the Limb and St. Thomas' Incredulity by Lorenzetto, based on Raphael's drawings.

=== Tower ===
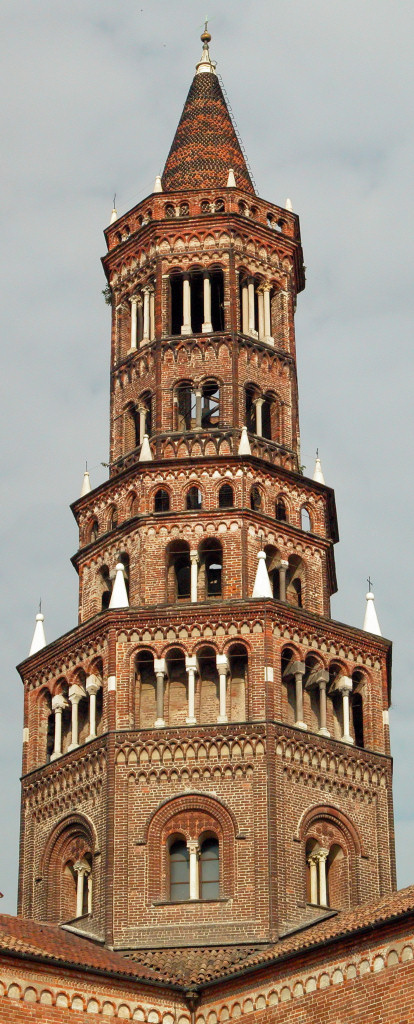
The church tower

The church tower, known in the local dialect as Ciribiciaccola, starts from the dome area at 9 meters, with two octagonal sections of 4.14 and 12.19 meters, and a final conical one of 11.97 m. The upper point, in correspondence of the tip of cross which lies over a globe, is at a total height of 56.26 m.

Each of the sections is divided into two area with Lombard bands in different shapes, with carved frames and white pinnacles. The double, triple or quadruple mullioned windows are in Candoglia marble, the same used for the Milan Cathedral, while the single ones are in cotto.

The exact date of construction of the tower is unknown, but it has been dated to 1329–1340 and attributed to Francesco Pecorari from Cremona due to its resemblance to the Torrazzo di Cremona and the belltower of the San Gottardo church in Milan. Additions from the 18th century were removed in the 1905.

== Agriculture and Grana Padano ==
Here as elsewhere in the Po valley the Cistercians, and later the Benedictines, were known for their industry in clearing the thickets and woodland and in draining the marshes so as to establish up-to-date agriculture practices based on a system of large farming establishments called granges. The origins of the hard Italian granular cheese known generically as grana—the best known examples today being Grana Padano and Parmigiano Reggiano (or Parmesan)—are traditionally ascribed to the monks of Chiaravalle.

== See also ==
- High medieval domes

== General and cited sources ==
- Chiaravalle. Arte e storia di un'abbazia cistercense. Milan: Electa. 1992.
