= Antica trattoria Bagutto =

Restaurant in Milan, Italy

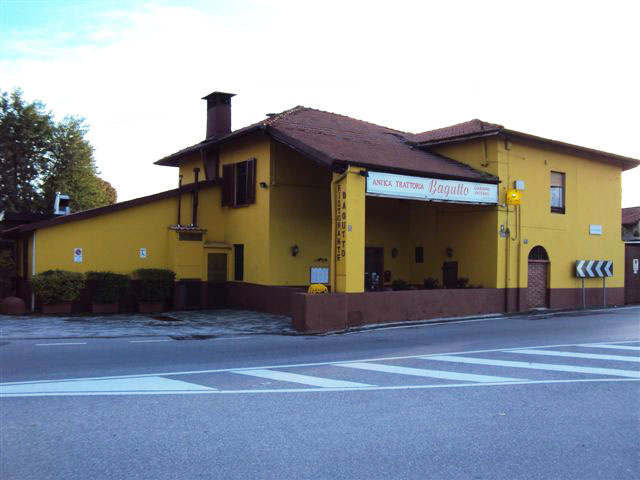

- Location within Milan

General information
- Type: Restaurant
- Architectural style: Rural
- Location: Milan, Italy, Via Elio Vittorini, 4
- Coordinates: 45.4444°N 9.2613°E
- Completed: Before 1284

Technical details
- Floor count: 2

Antica trattoria Bagutto is a restaurant in Milan, Italy, in the Ponte Lambro district on the eastern outskirts of the city. It is located near the "Via Mecenate" motorway exit of the Autostrada A51 (Tangenziale Est di Milano: "Milan east ring road"). It is the oldest restaurant in Italy and the second oldest in Europe, after the Stiftskeller St. Peter in Salzburg, Austria.

== History ==
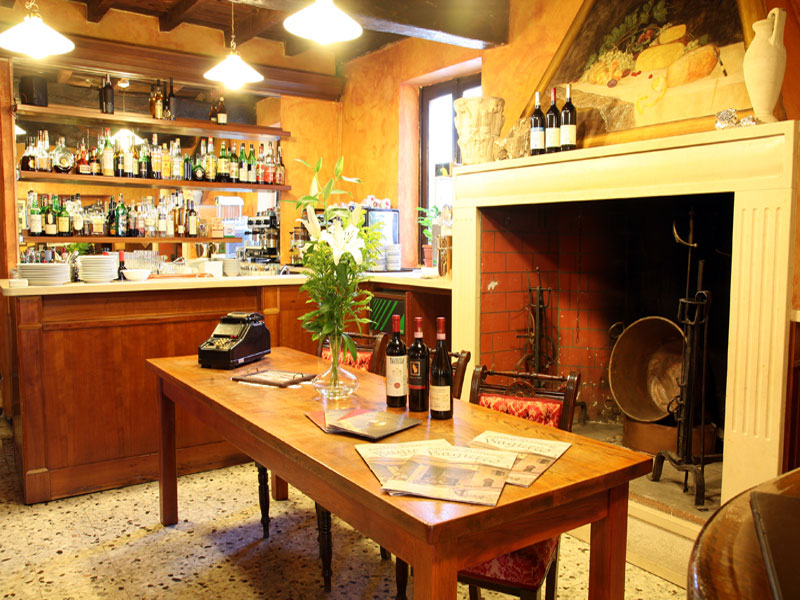
Interior of the Antica trattoria Bagutto

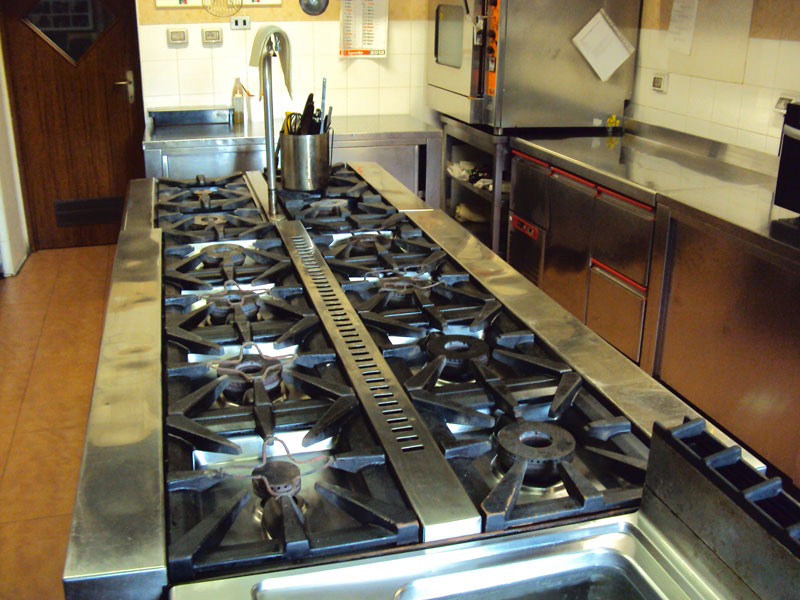
Kitchen of the Antica trattoria Bagutto

The Berlochium, from the Lombardic term meaning 'place where one eats', appears in a document of exchange of real estate dated to 1284. Its location, at the fourth mile of the Paullese road (Roman road between Milan and Cremona), near a ford that allowed crossing the Lambro river, makes an even more ancient origin possible.

It stood in the ancient municipality of Morsenchio, on the banks of the Spazzola canal or Molinara canal, on which mills were installed, including the Spazzola mill, which still exists.

From the 15th century it was the property of the Milanese charitable organization "Luogo pio delle Quattro Marie" and the inn took on various names over time: "Hosteria dei Gamberi" in the 15th century, in 1580 "Hostaria delle Quattro Marie alla Canova" (Canova was the name of the nearby farm, still owned by the charitable organisation).

At the beginning of the 18th century it passed to the Durini counts, then to the Ranieri family and in 1780 to the Merlini family. In 1871 it passed to the Counts and in 1894 it was purchased by Moses Mandelli, to whose descendants it still belongs.

The structure retains a 16th-century fireplace.

== See also ==
- List of oldest companies
- St. Peter Stiftskulinarium
