= Chiaravalle (district of Milan) =

Coordinates: 45°25′03″N 9°14′23″E

- Quartiere of Milan
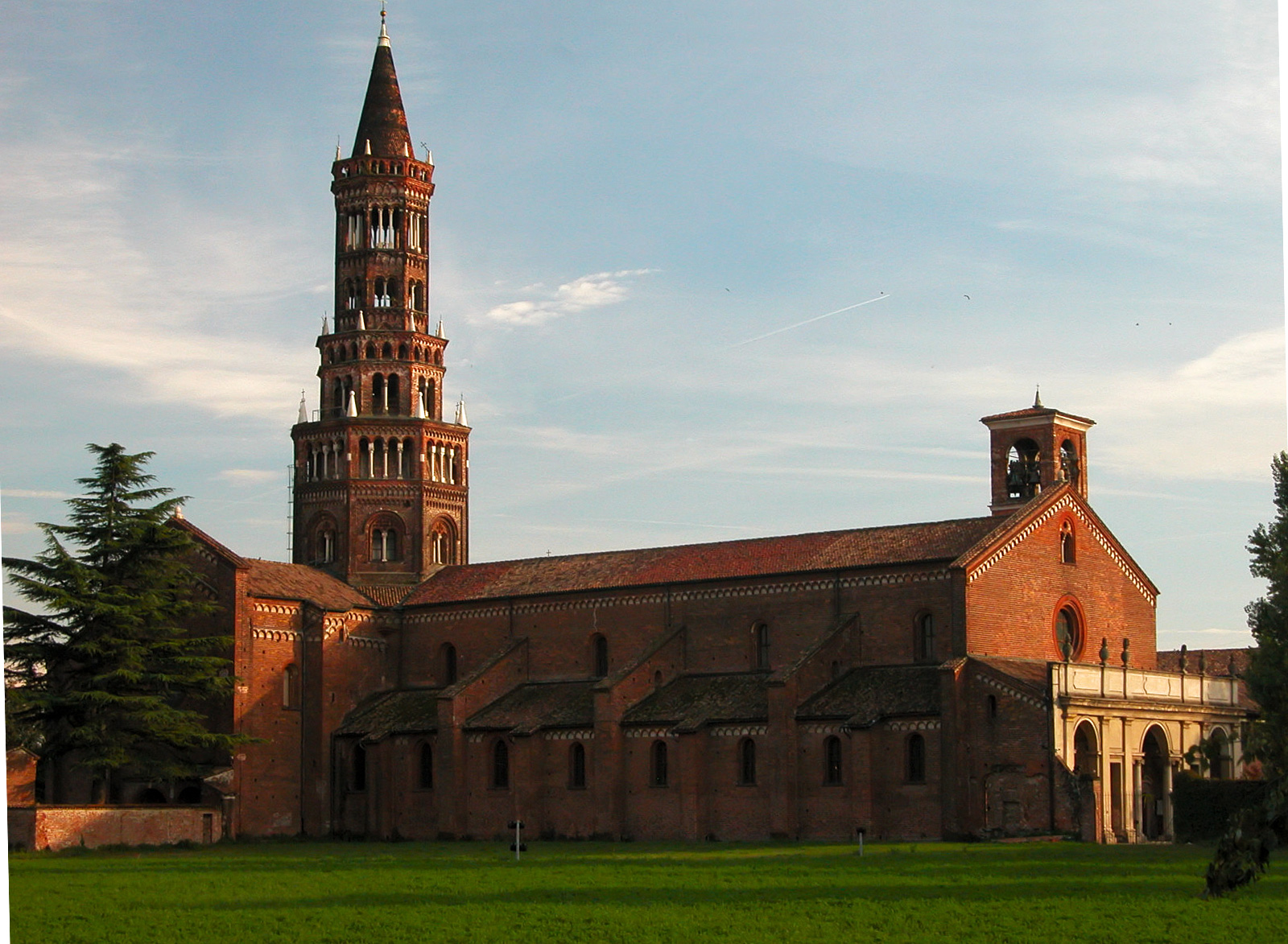
- Chiaravalle Abbey
- Interactive map of Chiaravalle
- Country: Italy
- Region: Lombardy
- Province: Milan
- Comune: Milan
- Zone: 5
- Time zone: UTC+1 (CET)
  - Summer (DST): UTC+2 (CEST)

Chiaravalle (Lombard: Ceravall [tʃeraˈʋal]) is a district (quartiere) of Milan, Italy, part of the Zone 5 administrative division of the city. It is located in the periphery south of the city centre, within the Parco Agricolo Sud Milano nature reserve.

Before 1923, Chiaravalle was an autonomous comune, named Chiaravalle Milanese.

Despite being annexed to Milan, Chiaravalle has maintained the character of an autonomous town. The park that embraces the district also separates it from the urban agglomeration of the city. This isolation is reinforced by the scarceness of public transportation to the centre, which mostly consists of a single bus line connecting Chiaravalle to Porta Romana. As this bus line has a stop at the Milan Metro station of Corvetto, this is the subway station that serves Chiaravalle, despite that of Rogoredo being closer.

The main landmark of the Chiaravalle district is eponymous abbey, a Gothic-Romanesque 12th century monastic complex.

== History ==
The original settlement of Chiaravalle formed in the Middle Ages, and was centered in the Chiaravalle Abbey founded by the Cistercians in 1135. Chiaravalle became part of Pieve di San Donato when the Milanese territory was organized into parishes (the Italian word for parish is pieve).

Under Napoleonic rule it was annexed to Milan, but went back to its autonomous status at the foundation of the Kingdom of Lombardy–Venetia. In 1861, Chiaravalle had 1,417 inhabitants.

In 1870 Chiaravalle and the nearby comune of Nosedo were merged.

In 1923, Chiaravalle became part of Milan.
