= Monluè =

Coordinates: 45°27′23″N 9°15′16″E

- Quartiere of Milan
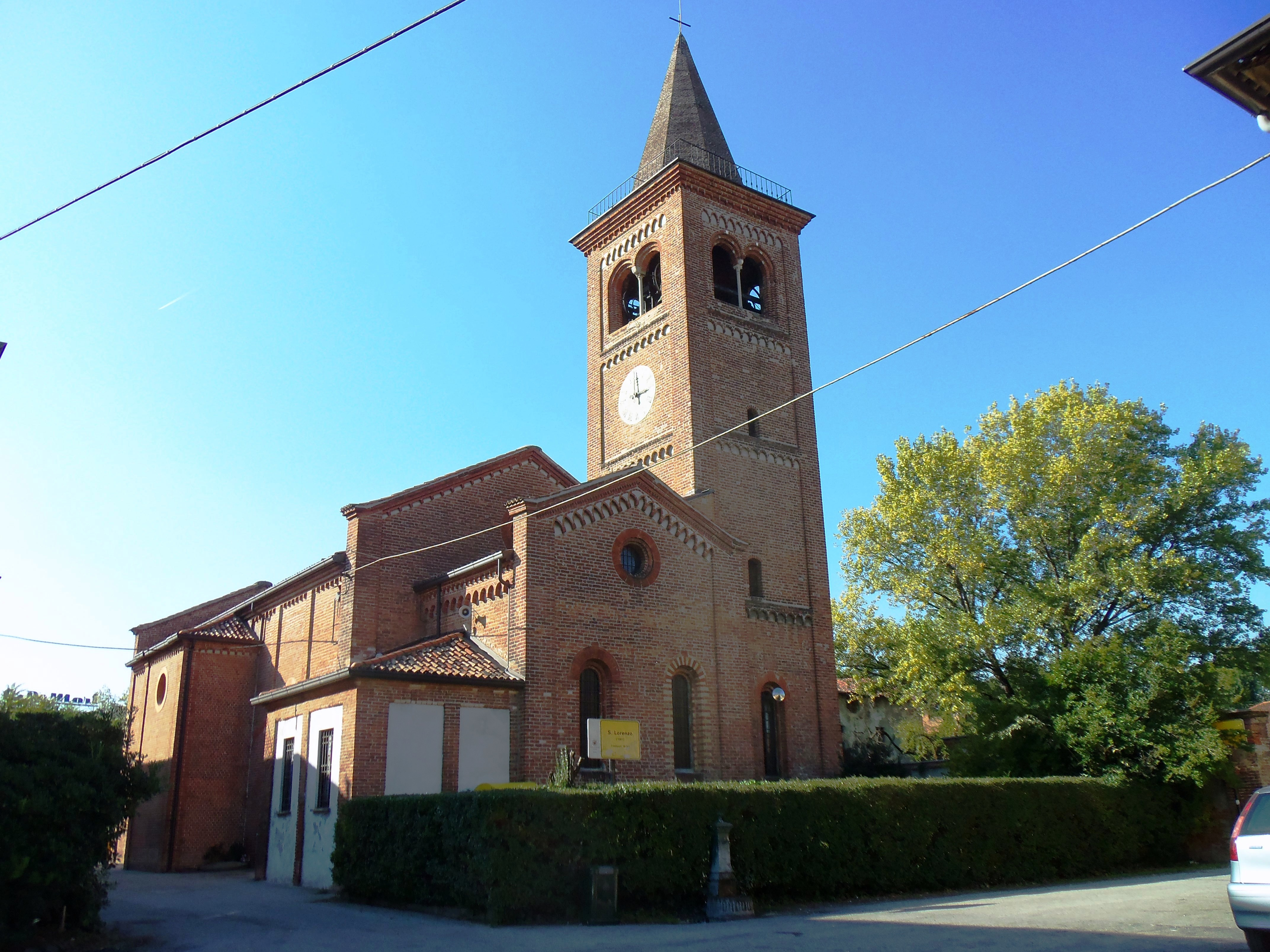
- The church of Saint Lawrence in Monluè
- Interactive map of Monluè
- Country: Italy
- Region: Lombardy
- Province: Milan
- Comune: Milan
- Zone: 4
- Time zone: UTC+1 (CET)
  - Summer (DST): UTC+2 (CEST)

Monluè is a district ("quartiere") of Milan, Italy, part of the Zone 4 administrative division, located east of the city centre. It is a small residential district that originated as a rural settlement. As a consequence of its isolation from the city proper, it has maintained wide green areas (the most notable of which is Monluè Park) and the general appearance of a small country town. The prominent landmark of the district is the eponymous Cascina Monluè, an ancient abbey built by the Humiliati religious order, that has been later adapted as a cascina (farmhouse) and is now used as the venue for a number of concerts and cultural events, especially in summer. Also of interest is the Church of Saint Lawrence, also built by the Humiliati in the 13th century.

== History ==
A distinct rural settlement in Monluè is reported at least since the Middle Ages; it was originally called Mons Luparium (in Latin, meaning "mountain - or hill - of the wolves"). This toponymy suggests that, back then, the area was probably more hilly than it is today, and that the forests between Monluè and Milan used to be infested by wolves. Despite the inhospitable environment, friars from the Humiliati religious order founded an abbey in Monluè in the 13th century. They reclaimed the land, and a small rural town gradually developed in the surroundings of the abbey.

When the Humiliati religious order was suppressed in 1571, all their belongings were confiscated by the Jesuits, who adapted the abbey as a farmhouse. The church was modified in 1584 and restored in 1877. In the early 20th century, the Monluè complex was ceded to the Pio Albergo Trivulzio (a humanitarian Milanese institution). The ex abbey (now Cascina Monluè) is now owned by the city of Milan; the church of Saint Lawrence is still consecrated and in use.

As a difference with other border districts of Milan, such as Ponte Lambro to the south, Monluè has never experienced a true industrialization process; on the other hand, agricultural activities in the area have been gradually dismissed, so that the population has been decreasing rather than increasing over time, an unusual trend in the Milanese area.
