= Porta Romana (Milan) =

Coordinates: 45°27′8.14″N 9°12′7.39″E

Porta Romana Imperial door Imperial Gate of the City of Milan
- Quartiere of Milan
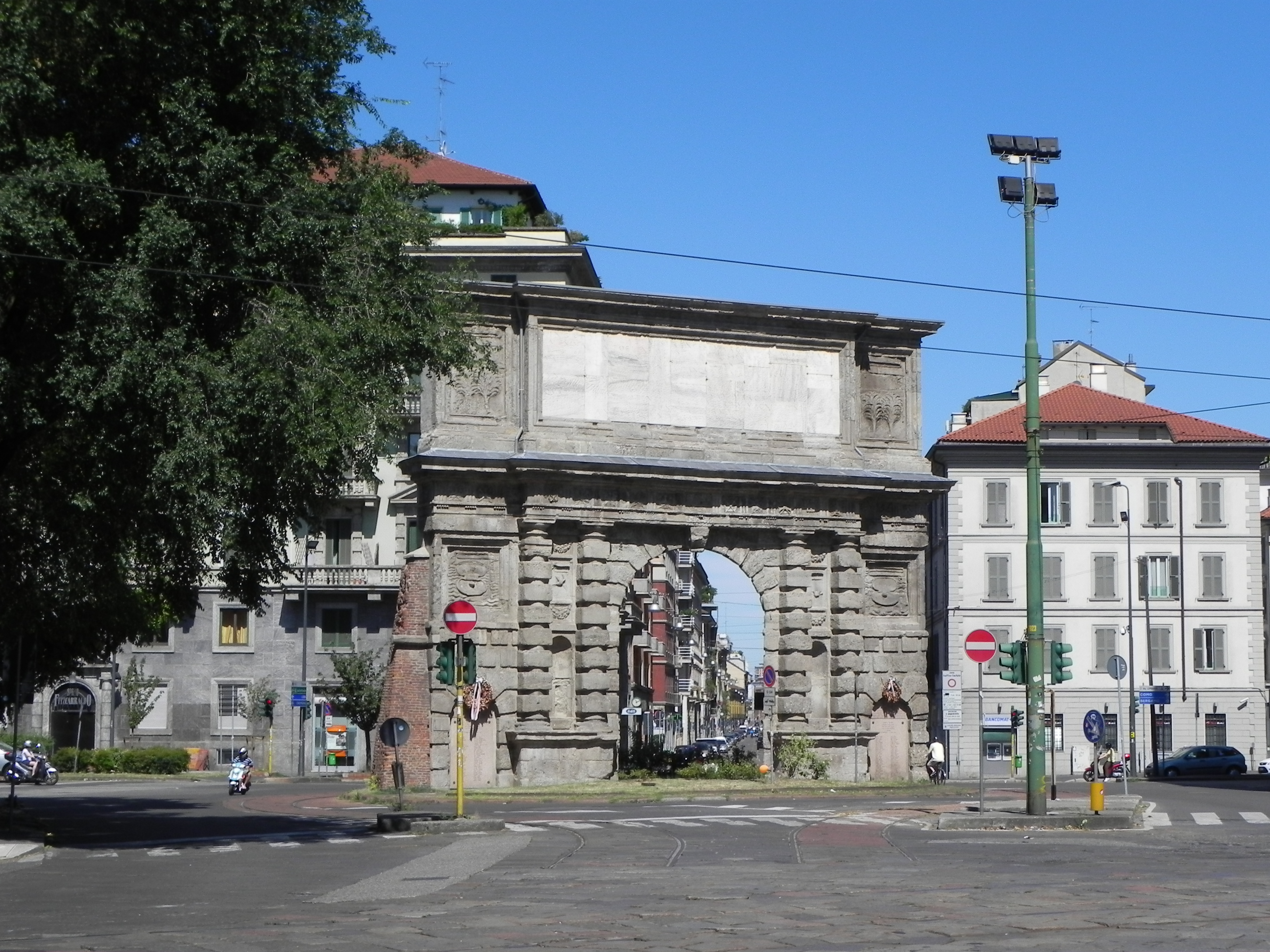
- Porta Romana
- Interactive map of Porta Romana
- Country: Italy
- Region: Lombardy
- Province: Milan
- Comune: Milan
- Zone: 4
- Time zone: UTC+1 (CET)
  - Summer (DST): UTC+2 (CEST)

Porta Romana ("Roman Gate") is a former city gate of Milan, Italy. In its present form, the gate dates back to the 16th century Spanish walls of Milan. Its origins can be traced further back to the Roman walls of the city, which had a corresponding "Roman Gate" roughly in the same area. Porta Romana was the first and the main imperial entrance of the entire city of Milan, as it was the starting point of the road leading to Ancient Rome.

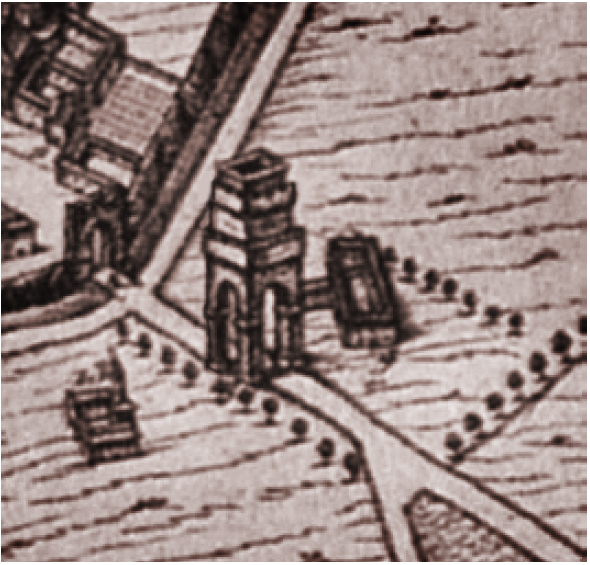
The triumphal arch of Via Porticata, detail from a map of Milan dated 1158

The name "Porta Romana" is used both to refer to the gate proper and to the surrounding district ("quartiere"), part of the Zone 4 administrative division of Milan (and bordering with zone 5), located south-east of the city centre.

== The gate ==
=== History ===
The Roman walls of Milan already had a gate facing in the same direction as Porta Romana; yet it was located much closer to the city centre, in a place that corresponds to what is now Piazza Missori. In the Middle Ages (12th century) the walls were enlarged, and the gate was moved outwards in the direction of modern Corso di Porta Venezia. In the 16th century, a third system of walls was built under the Spanish rule, and the gate was moved further away from the centre to its current location. The construction of the gate was completed by 1596, on the occasion of Queen Margaret of Spain visiting Milan. For two centuries, Porta Romana was the most sumptuous gate of Milan.

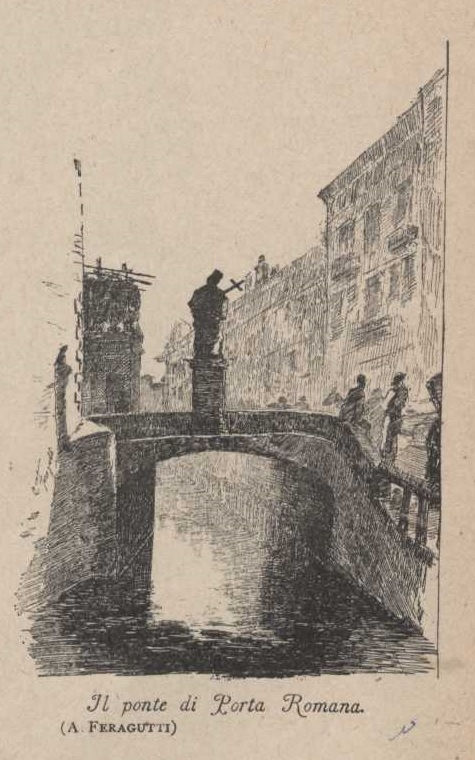
Porta Romana bridge in the 19th century

=== Location and structure ===
Porta Romana is located at the centre of a city square called Piazza Medaglie d'Oro, about 2 km south-east of the city centre. It is placed at the conjunction of several major streets, namely Corso Lodi (to the south east), Viale Montenero (to the north east), and Corso di Porta Romana (leading north west, towards the Duomo).

The structure of the gate is inspired by Roman triumphal arches of the doric order.

== The district ==
Coat of Arms of the Porta Romana rione

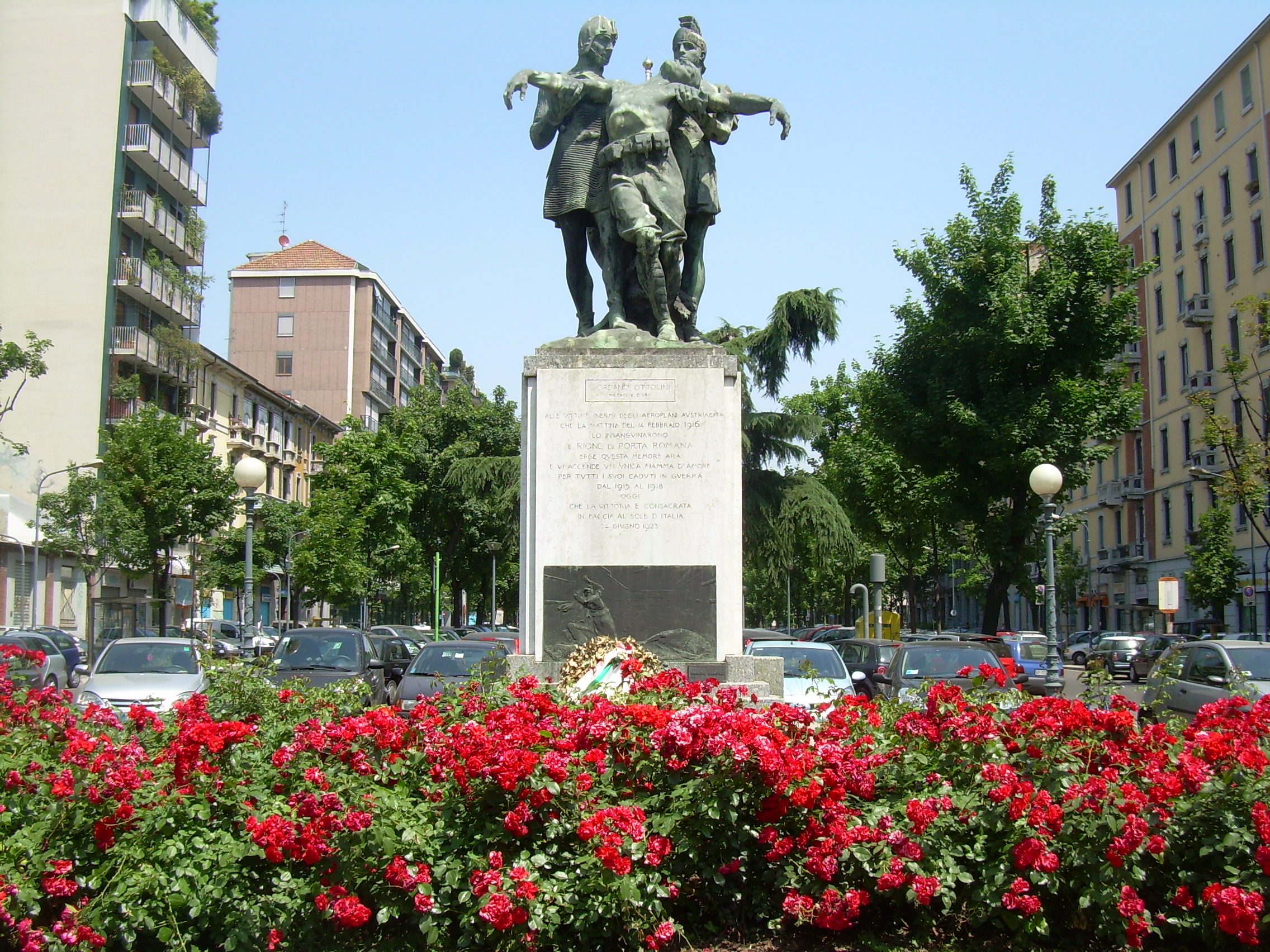
The monument to the World War I fallen of Porta Romana rione, called "The Three Drunkards" by the locals

The area around the Porta Romana gate is one of the historic districts (rioni) of Milan; the rione had its own coat of arms, vermilion red. Today, the inner part of the Porta Romana district is adjacent to the city centre, and thus has a similar character as the centre itself: it is mostly a shopping district, with sumptuous 19th century- and early 20th century buildings that are either used as prestigious offices or as residences for the Milanese élite. Several institutions, including embassies and high level schools, are based in this area. Milanese celebrities that have lived here include Enzo Biagi, Enzo Bearzot, and Dario Fo. The southern part of the district, farther away from the centre, is correspondingly less luxurious. Specific situations of urban decay, such as slums developing in abandoned traits of the old railway, have been reported.

Much of the activity today centres on the Policlinico hospital and the famous Bocconi University so there is a young population by day, although there is not the same student buzz here as in other parts of the city.

== Links ==
- Corso Lodi
