= Zone 9 of Milan =

Administrative region of Milan in Lombardy, Italy

Coordinates: 45.516888°N 9.191866°E

Zone 9 of Milan Municipality 9
- Municipality of Milan
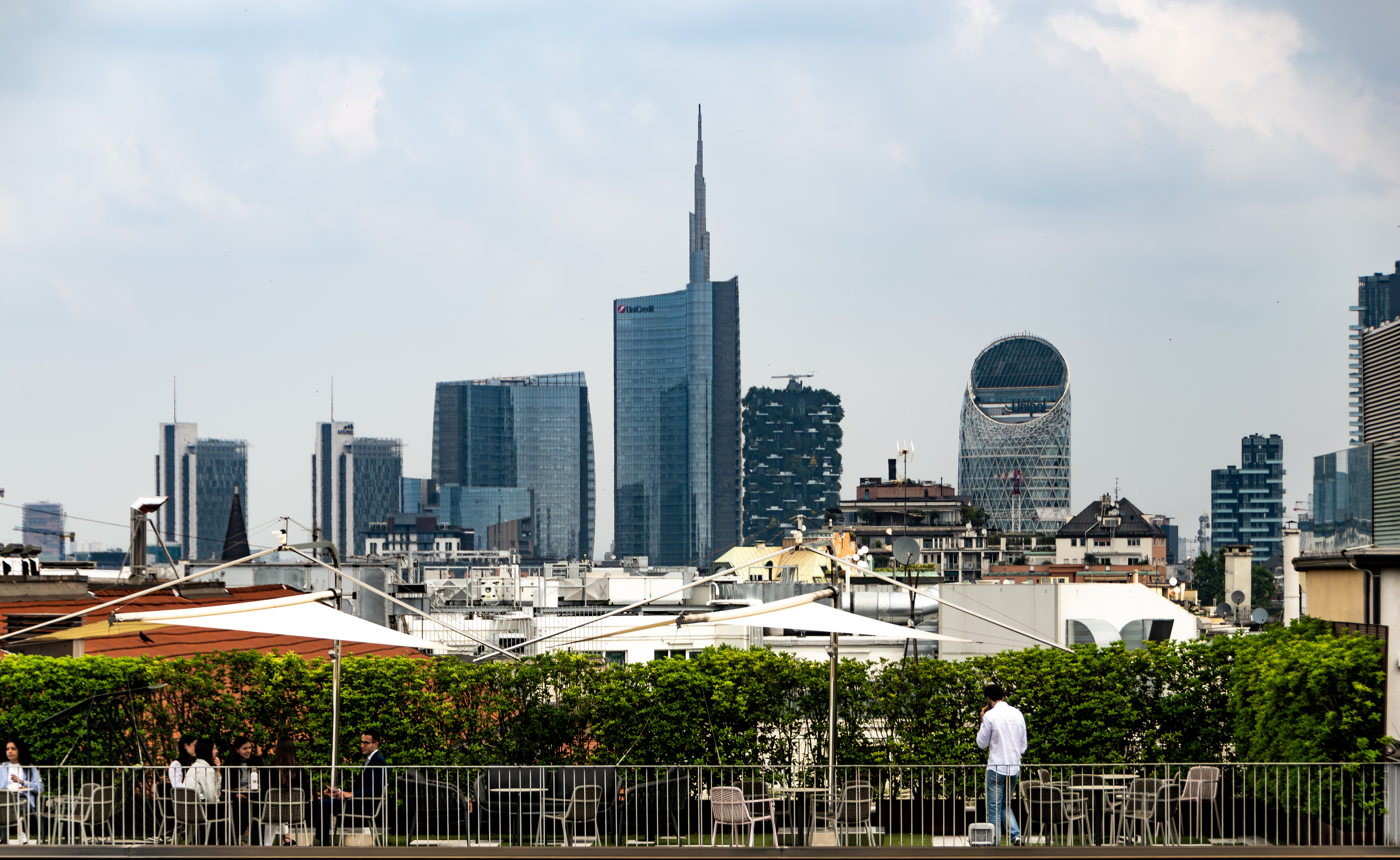

- Location of Municipality 9 of Milan
- Country: Italy
- Region: Lombardy
- Province: Metro City of Milan
- Comune: Milan

Government
  - President: Anita Pirovano (PD)

Area
  - Total: 21.12 km^{2} (8.15 sq mi)

Population (2022)
  - Total: 186,007
  - Density: 8,598/km^{2} (22,270/sq mi)
- Time zone: UTC+1 (CET)
  - Summer (DST): UTC+2 (CEST)
- Website: Municipality 9

The Zone 9 of Milan, since 2016 officially Municipality 9 of Milan, (in Italian: Zona 9 di Milano, Municipio 9 di Milano) is one of the 9 administrative divisions of Milan, Italy.

It was officially created as an administrative subdivision during the 1980s. On 14 April 2016, in order to promote a reform on the municipal administrative decentralization, the City Council of Milan established the new Municipality 9, a new administrative body responsible for running most local services, such as schools, social services, waste collection, roads, parks, libraries and local commerce.

On 5 March 1999 the new Zone 9, which corresponds to the northern part of the city, was made up by the union of the previous Zones 2 (Centro Direzionale, Greco, Zara), 7 (Bovisa, Dergano), 8 (Affori, Bruzzano, Comasina) and 9 (Niguarda, Bicocca).

== Subdivision ==
The borough includes the following districts:

- Affori, a rural settlement referenced as early as 915 which was annexed to Milan in 1923;
- Bicocca, a district incorporated in the city in 1841. In the 19th century, the area of Bicocca was affected by a quick industrialization process, and was gradually absorbed into the urban agglomerate of Milan. In the first half of the 20th century Bicocca became the centre of an important industrial area that also comprised Greco and Sesto San Giovanni, and that greatly contributed to the Italian economy of the time. The first facilities to be established in Bicocca were those of Pirelli, Ansaldobreda, and Wagons-Lits. In the nearby area of Sesto, the Falck steel mill was also a prominent factory. Pirelli maintained a leading role in the area. A historic neighbourhood of Bicocca, "Borgo Pirelli" ("Pirelli Town"), was originally developed as a residential area for the thousands of workers that were employed in the Pirelli factories. Deindustrialization of the Bicocca district began in the 1970s. In 1985, Pirelli started a project to redevelop the area. The resulting "Progetto Bicocca" (Bicocca Project), which affected an area of 960.000 m^{2}, was the largest urban transformation project in the history of Italy, and the second in Europe, after that of Berlin. The prominent results of this project were the construction of a large university district (called University of Milan Bicocca) and of the Teatro degli Arcimboldi, a large theatre that has also been used to house La Scala shows while the historic La Scala theatre was undergoing restoration. Other main buildings realized by the project were a seat of the CNR (National Council of Research) and the Istituto Neurologico Besta, a major neurological hospital. Several companies now have their Milanese headquarters in Bicocca, including Pirelli, Prysmian Group, Siemens, Deutsche Bank, ING Group, Reuters, Fastweb, Engie, Philips, Johnson & Johnson, Dell and Hachette-Rusconi;
- Bovisa, An industrial area in the outskirt of the city since the second half of the nineteenth century, Bovisa has undergone a thorough transformation since the 1950s, when most factories were dismantled to be moved farther from the expanding city center. After a period of decay, a process of renewal followed, which transformed the Bovisa into a mainly residential suburb. The district is now experiencing an upturn, thanks to the many activities which relocated in the zone. Among them, the Politecnico di Milano, with its Bovisa campus, played a major role. The campus features the schools of Design, Architecture and Industrial Engineering. The area has since gained notoriety as a design and art "melting pot". This trend was confirmed in 2006, when a new headquarters of the Triennale design and art museum, dedicated to modern art, was established in this area;
- Bovisasca, a former industrial district, now transformed into a mostly residential area;
- Bruzzano;
- Centro Direzionale, originally designed to accommodate office buildings for tertiary activities. A relevant part of the design effort focused on the realization of adequate infrastructures supporting heavy daily commute, although only some of the corresponding projects were actually implemented. The main transportation hub in the area is Porta Garibaldi railway station, with connection to the Milan Metro, the suburban network and national rail lines;
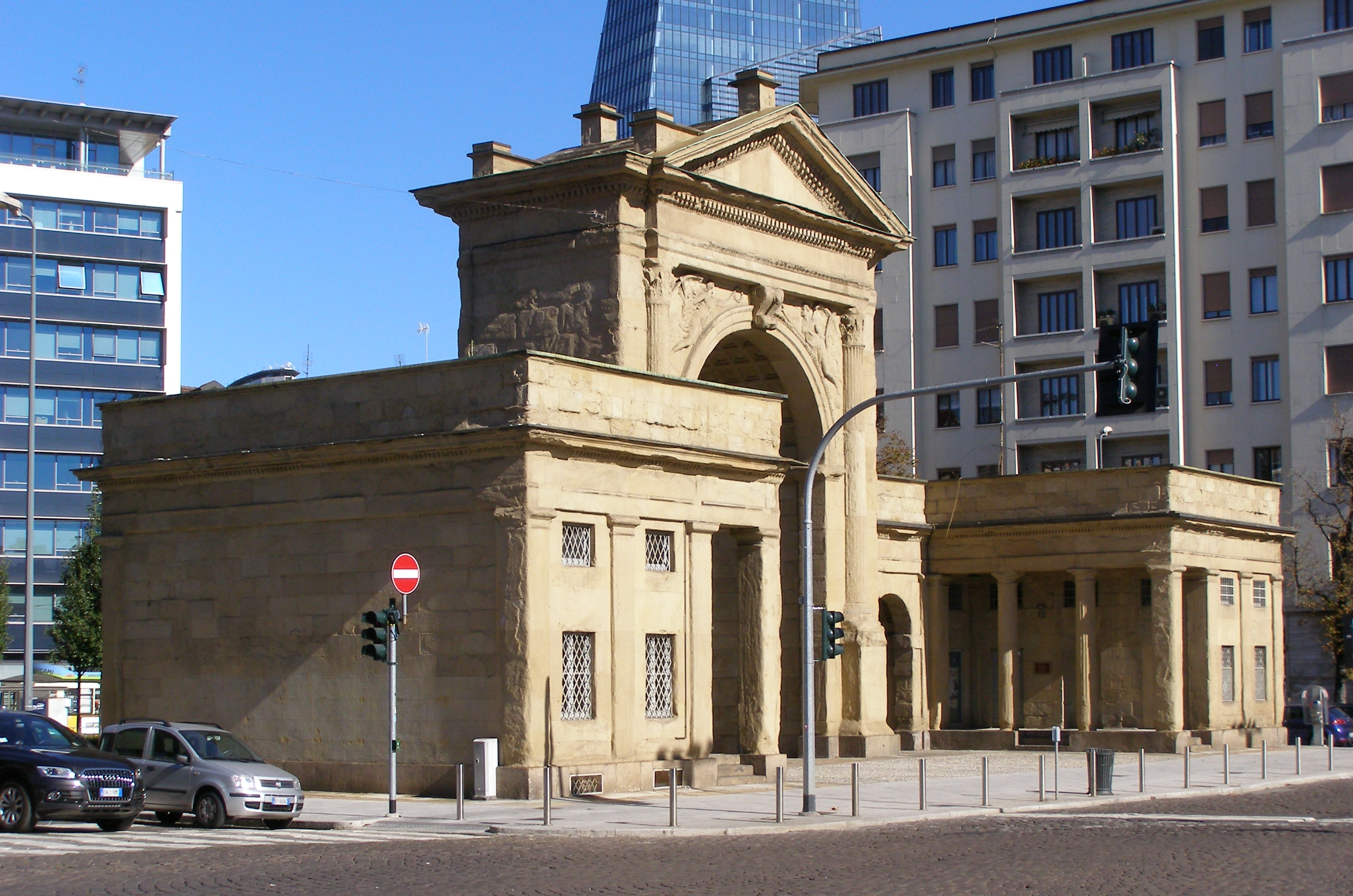
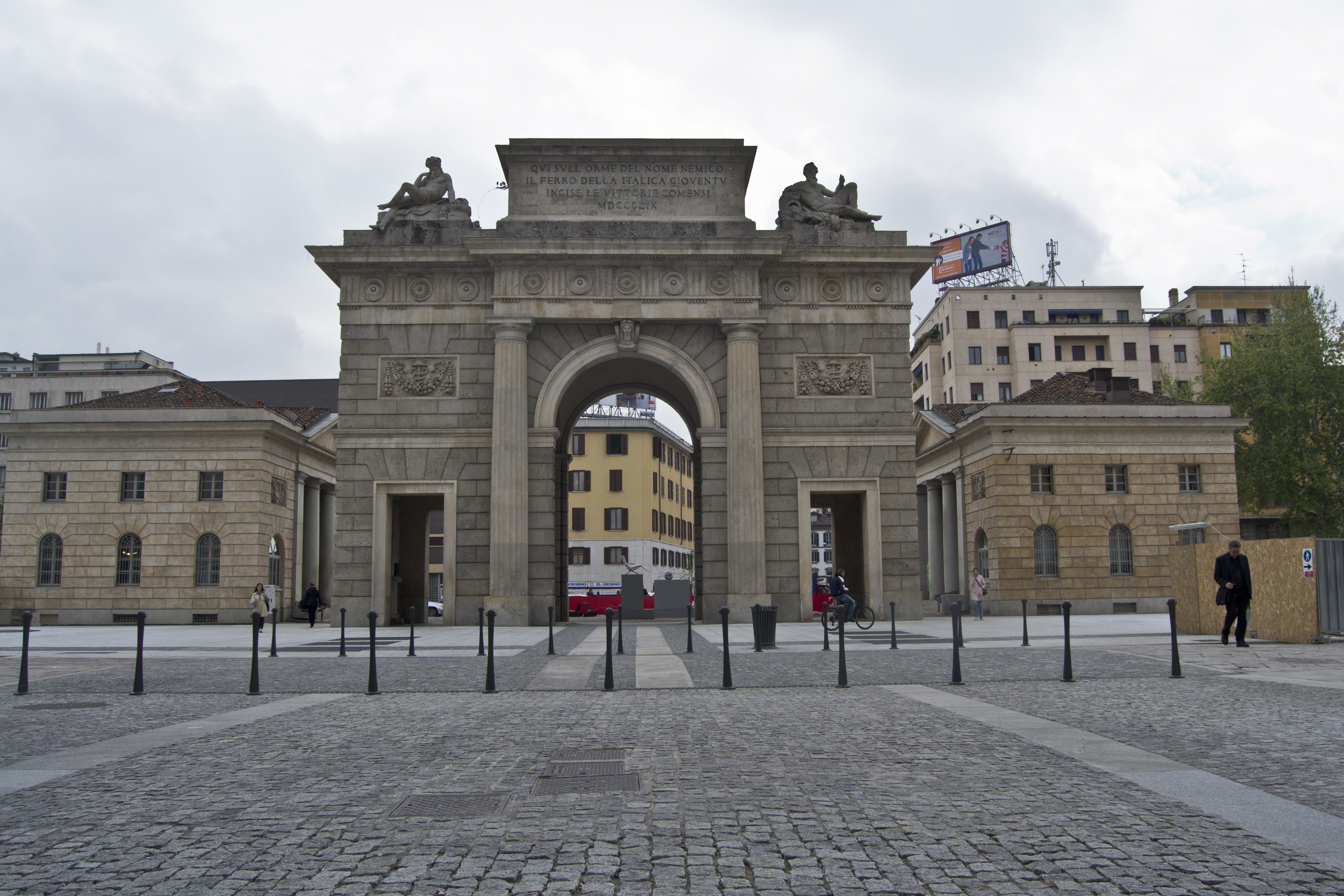
The Napoleonic Porta Nuova (left) and Porta Garibaldi (right), built respectively in 1813 and 1828, are the two main historical doors in this area.
- Comasina;
- Dergano;
- Fulvio Testi;
- Isola; a district (quartier) of Milan, Italy. It is an area located within Zone 9 of the city.
- La Fontana;
- Montalbino;
- Niguarda;
- Porta Garibaldi;
- Porta Nuova;
- Prato Centenaro;
- Segnano.

== Historical development ==
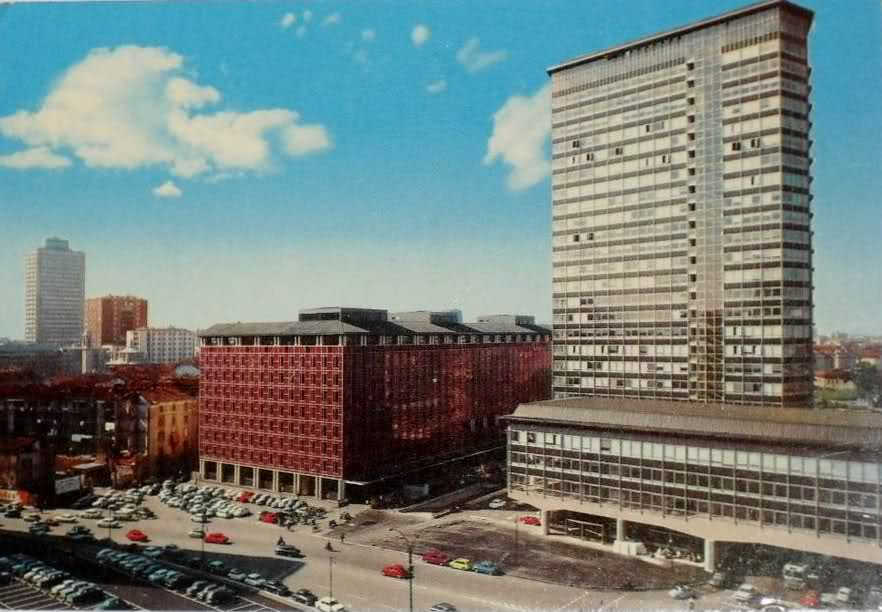
Centro Direzionale during the 1960s

Bosco Verticale

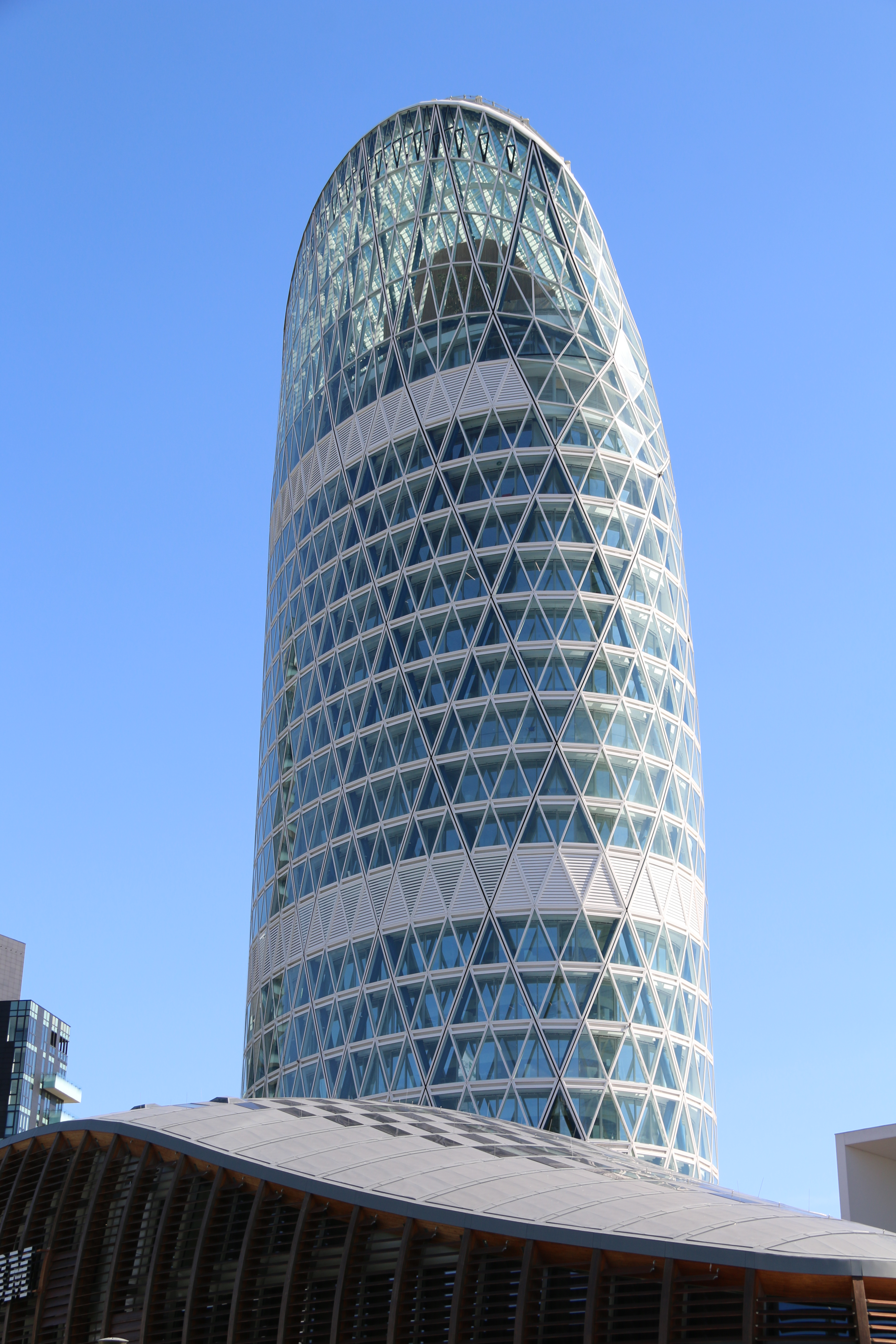
UnipolSai Tower

Apart from Affori, Bruzzano, Comasina, Dergano and Segnano, which were autonomous municipalities before being annexed to the main city of Milan in 1923, the urban development of the Zone 9 has always been linked with the development of the Centro Direzionale district.

Overall, the realization of the new district took place between 1955 and 1962, but was later suspended as a consequence of the lack of an actual regulation preventing tertiary activities to be established in the city centre. For several years thereafter, the Centro Direzionale remained an heterogeneous and sparse area. Some skyscrapers were built (including the Pirelli Tower, the Galfa Tower, and the Servizi Tecnici Comunali Tower) but other areas remained undeveloped and fell in decay. A major example of the inconsistent use of urban areas in the district was the establishment of the Varesine "Luna Park" (now dismissed) amidst a supposedly office and financial district.

=== Porta Nuova district development ===
After a long period of urban decay, the Porta Nuova district is now undergoing a massive renewal, thanks to the "Progetto Porta Nuova" (Porta Nuova Project). The project, which has been under construction since the late 2000s, includes several modern high rise buildings, cultural centres, and a large city park. As a result of these developments, the Porta Nuova district will ideally merge with the bordering Centro Direzionale di Milano, the oldest business district of Milan that is characterized by 1950s-1960s towers, many of which dedicated to government offices and other major public and private companies.

This project effects areas from the neighborhoods of Isola, Varesine and Porta Garibaldi. Construction started in 2009, with completion planned in 2014. The project involves the work of noted architects such as Cesar Pelli, Stefano Boeri and Nicholas Grimshaw. The redevelopment area extends from Porta Garibaldi station to piazza della Repubblica and from Porta Nuova gate to Palazzo Lombardia.

=== Bosco Verticale ===
The project was designed as part of the rehabilitation of the historic district of Milan between Via De Castillia and Confalonieri. It consists of two residential towers of which the largest is 26 floors and 110 meters high (called Torre E) and the smaller tower is 18 floors and 76 meters high (called Torre D). It contains 400 condominium units priced from 3,000 Euro per square metre and higher.

It is called Bosco Verticale because each tower houses trees between three and six meters which help mitigate smog and produce oxygen. It is also used to moderate temperatures in the building in the winter and summer. The plants also attenuate noise. The design was tested in a wind tunnel to ensure the trees would not topple from gusts of wind. Botanists and horticulturalists were consulted by the engineering team to ensure that the structure could bear the load imposed by the plants. The steel-reinforced concrete balconies are designed to be 28 cm thick, with 1.30 metre parapets.

=== Towers and skyscrapers ===
Name	Construction years	Height (including spire)	Current status
Unicredit Tower	2009–2012	152m (230m)	In use
Palazzo Lombardia	2007–2010	161m	In use
Solaria Tower	2010–2013	143m	In use
Diamond Tower	2010–2012	140m	In use
Pirelli Tower	1956–1958	127m	In use
UnipolSai Tower	2019–2024	125m	In use
Gioia 22 Tower	2018–2021	120m	In use
Bosco Verticale	2009–2014	110m	In use
Galfa Tower	1956–1959	109m	In use

==== Gallery ====
Pirelli Tower

UniCredit Tower is the tallest building of Italy

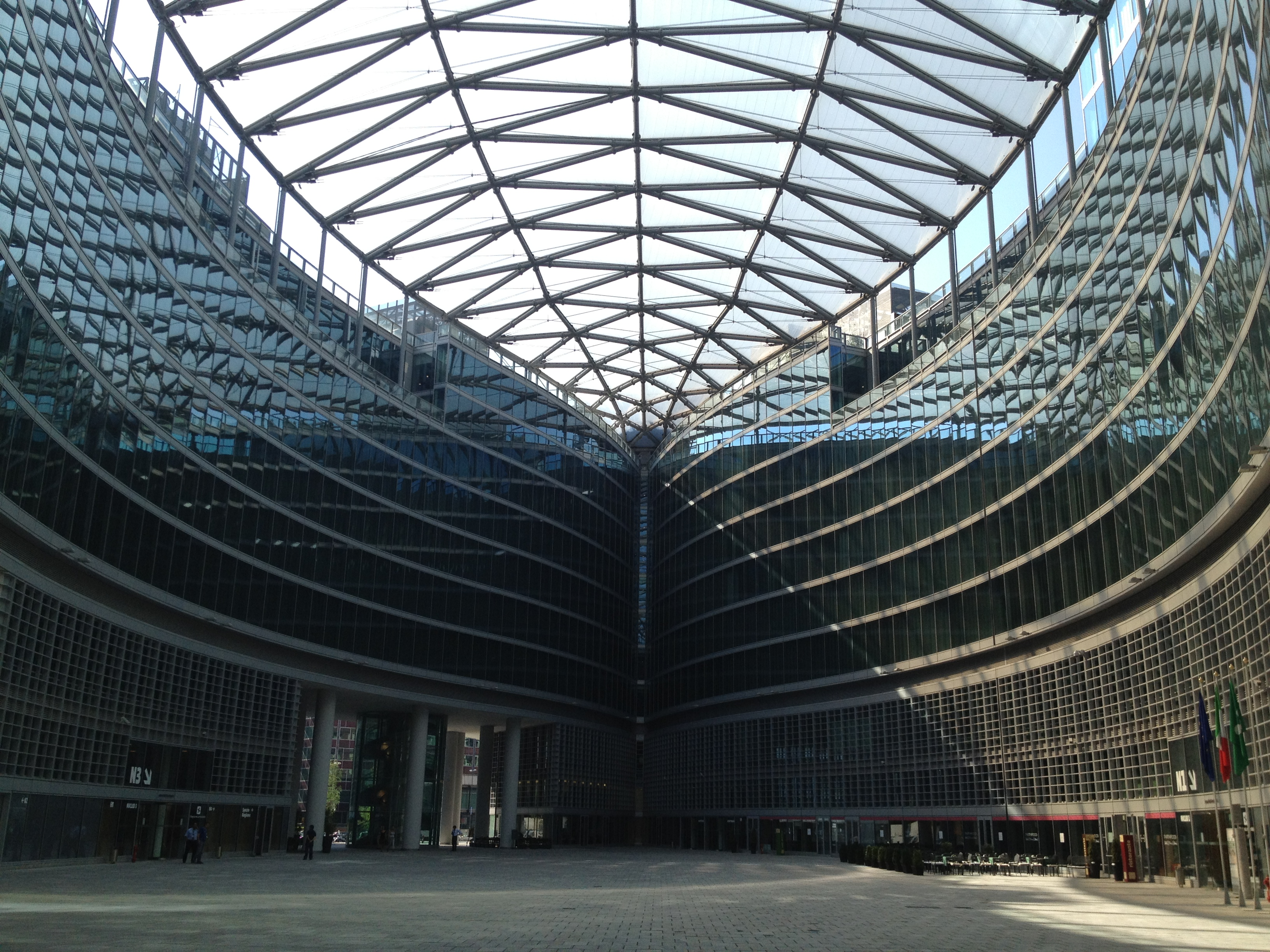
Palazzo Lombardia, seat of the Regional Government of Lombardy

Diamond Tower

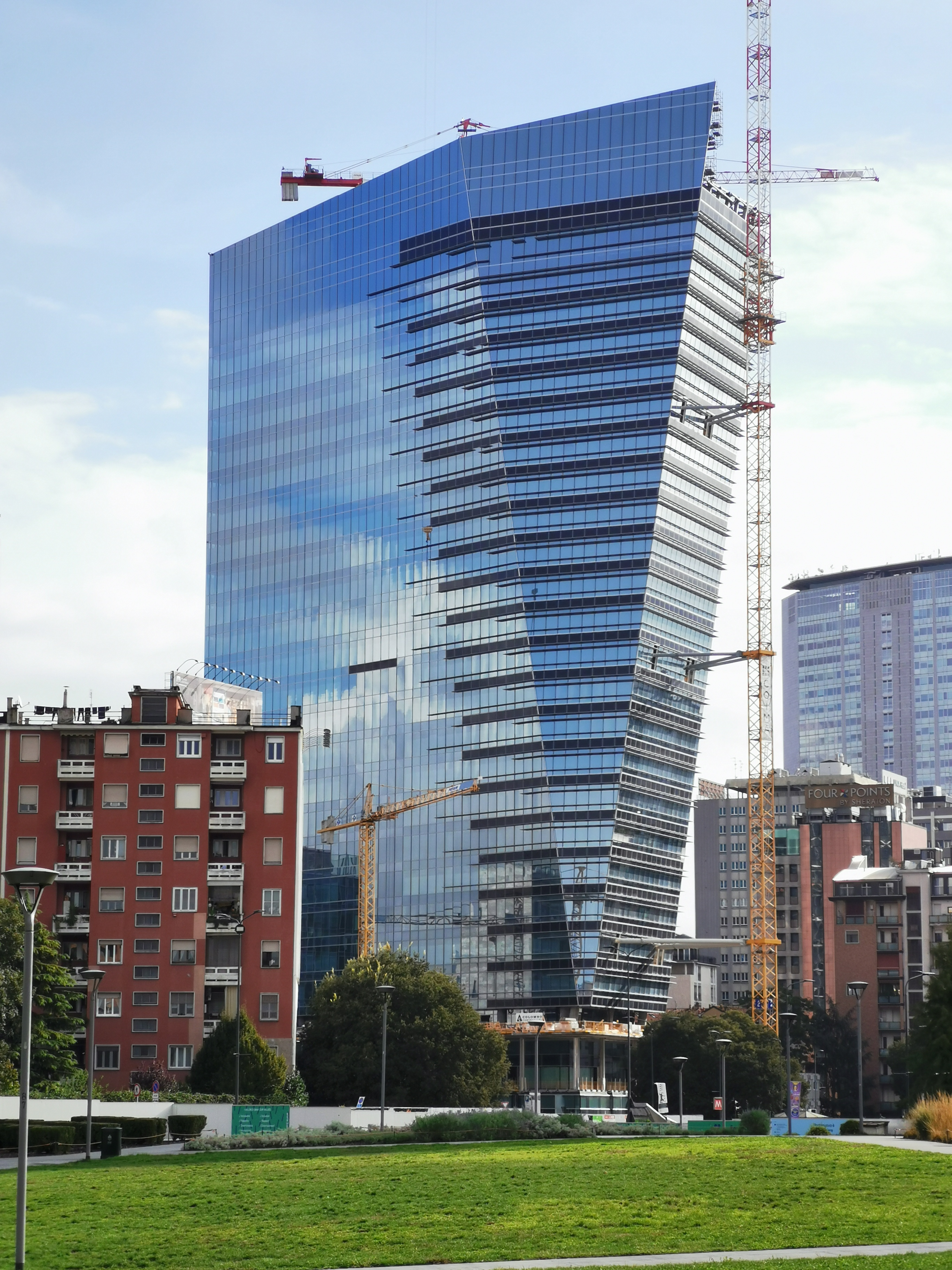
Gioia 22 Tower

AXA Palace

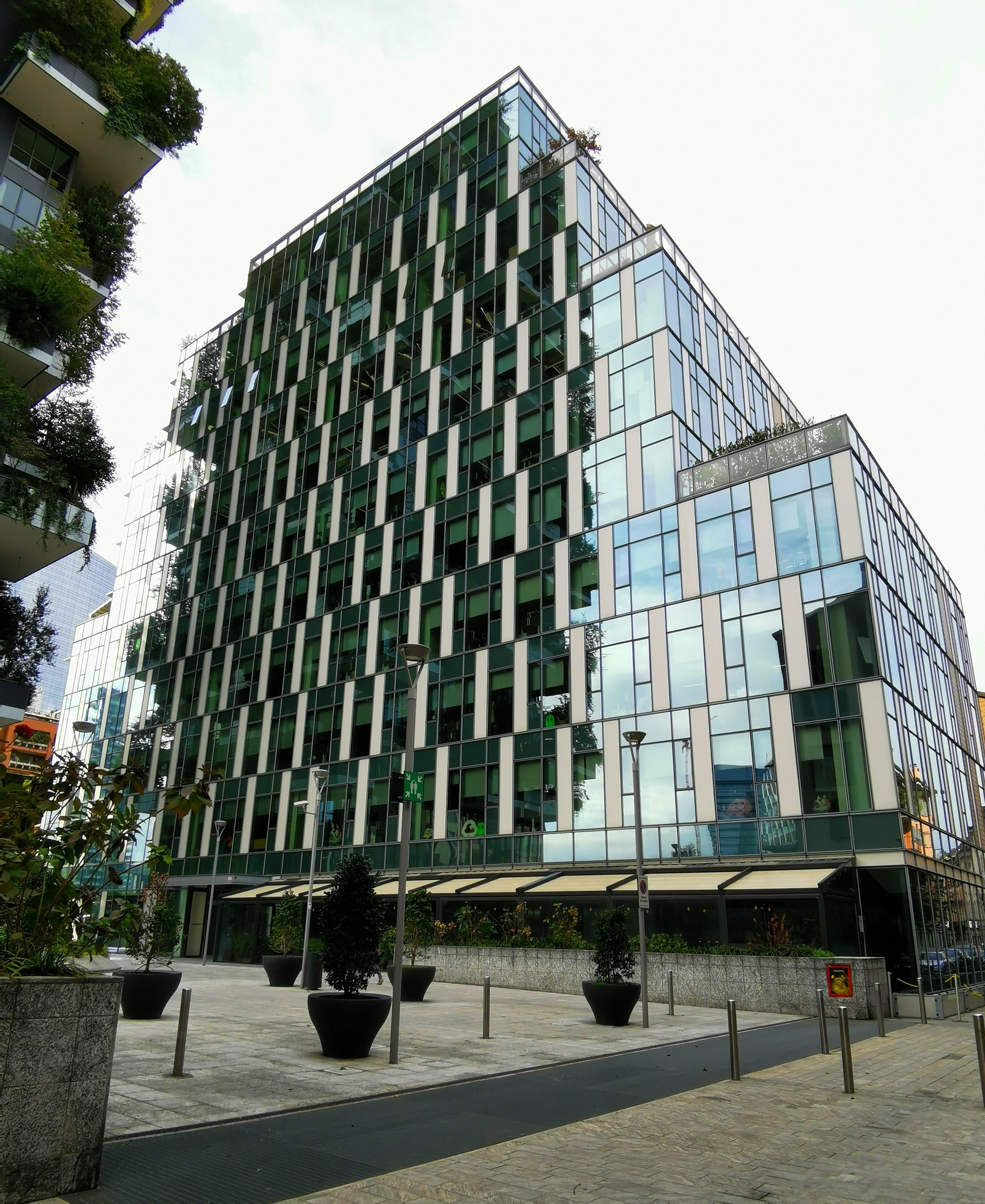
The Ziggurat, seat of Google Italia

Solaria Tower

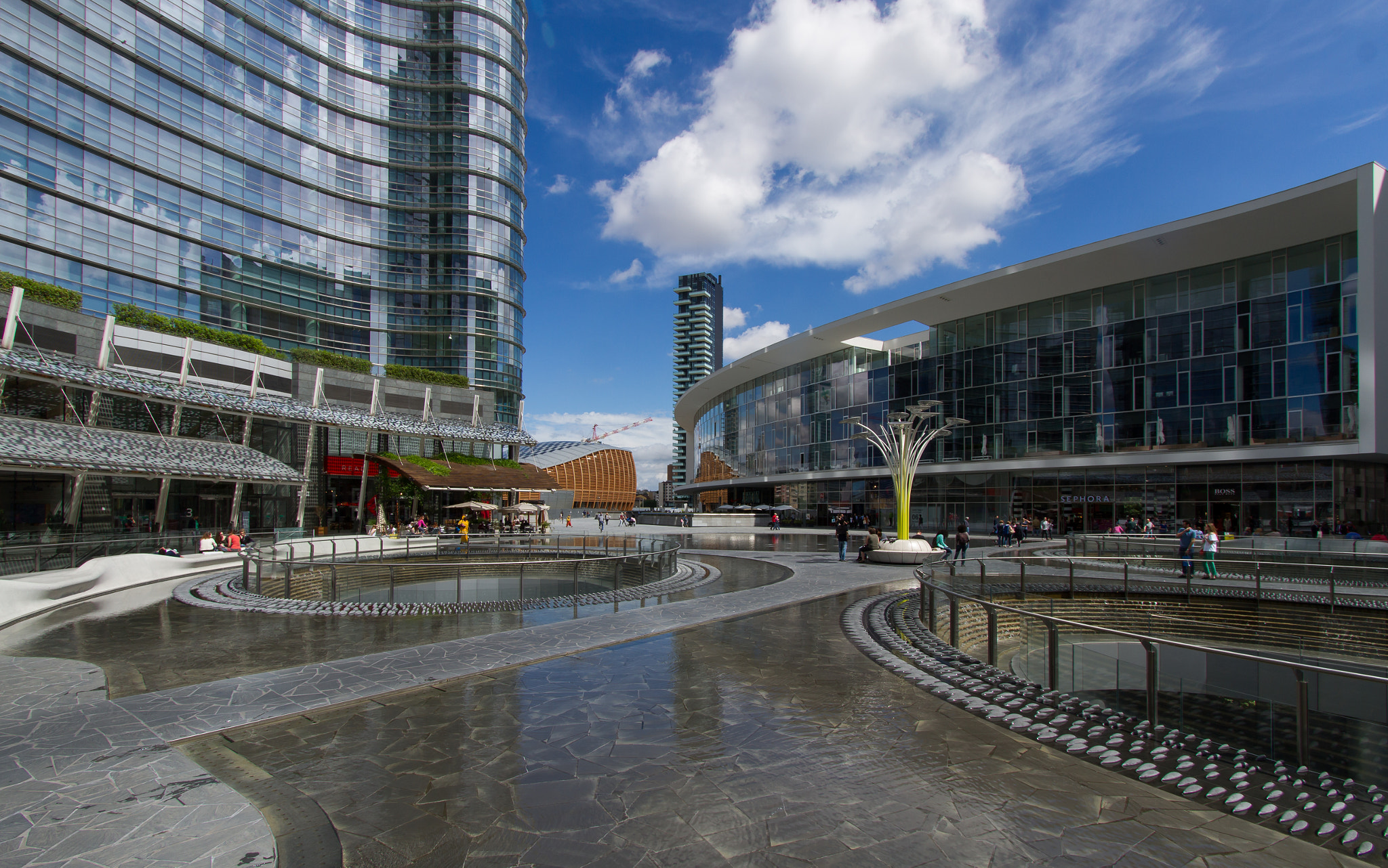
Gae Aulenti Square

== Municipal government ==
The area has its own local authority called Consiglio di Municipio (Municipal Council), composed by the President and 30 members directly elected by citizens every five years. The Council is responsible for most local services, such as schools, social services, waste collection, roads, parks, libraries and local commerce in the area, and manages funds (if any) provided by the city government for specific purposes, such as those intended to guarantee the right to education for poorer families.

The current President is Anita Pirovano (PD), elected on 3–4 October 2021.

Here is the current composition of the Municipal Council after 2021 municipal election:

Alliance or political party	Members		Composition
Alliance or political party	2021–2026		Composition
Centre-left (PD-EV)	18	18 / 30	
Centre-right (FI-L-FdI-UDC)	11	11 / 30	
M5S	1	1 / 30	

Here is a full lists of the directly elected Presidents of Municipio since 2011:

President	Term of office		Party
Beatrice Uguccioni	16 May 2011	27 June 2016	PD
Giuseppe Lardieri	27 June 2016	8 October 2021	FI
Anita Pirovano	8 October 2021	Incumbent	PD

== Education ==
In this borough are located 17 primary schools, while there are two important universities:

- University of Milano-Bicocca, which has its origins from the splitting of the University of Milan, which with about 90,000 students in the 1990s was becoming overcrowded. Bicocca district was chosen as the location for the new university. This area was occupied by the Pirelli industrial complex until the 1980s and the new campus was part of a larger urban renewal project. The university was officially established on 10 June 1998.
- Polytechnic University-Bovisa campus, located in the Bovisa district and became active in 1989; campus Bovisa is today composed of campus Durando, opened in 1994, and campus La Masa, inaugurated in 1997. The first is the seat of the School of Design, while the second is dedicated to Industrial, Mechanical, Aerospace, and Energy Engineering faculties. Bovisa also houses the related research facilities, including the wind tunnel.
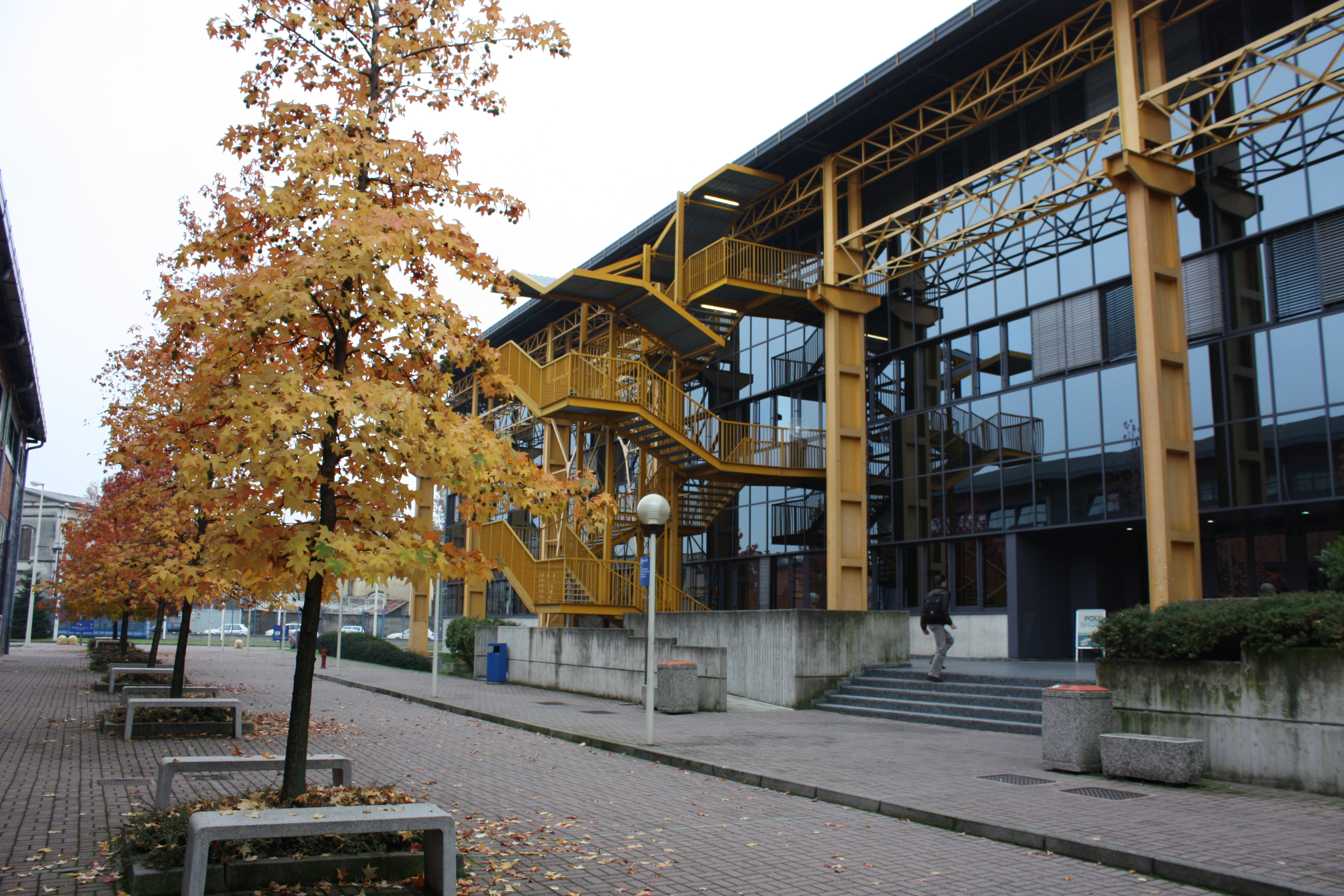
Polytechnic University-Bovisa campus

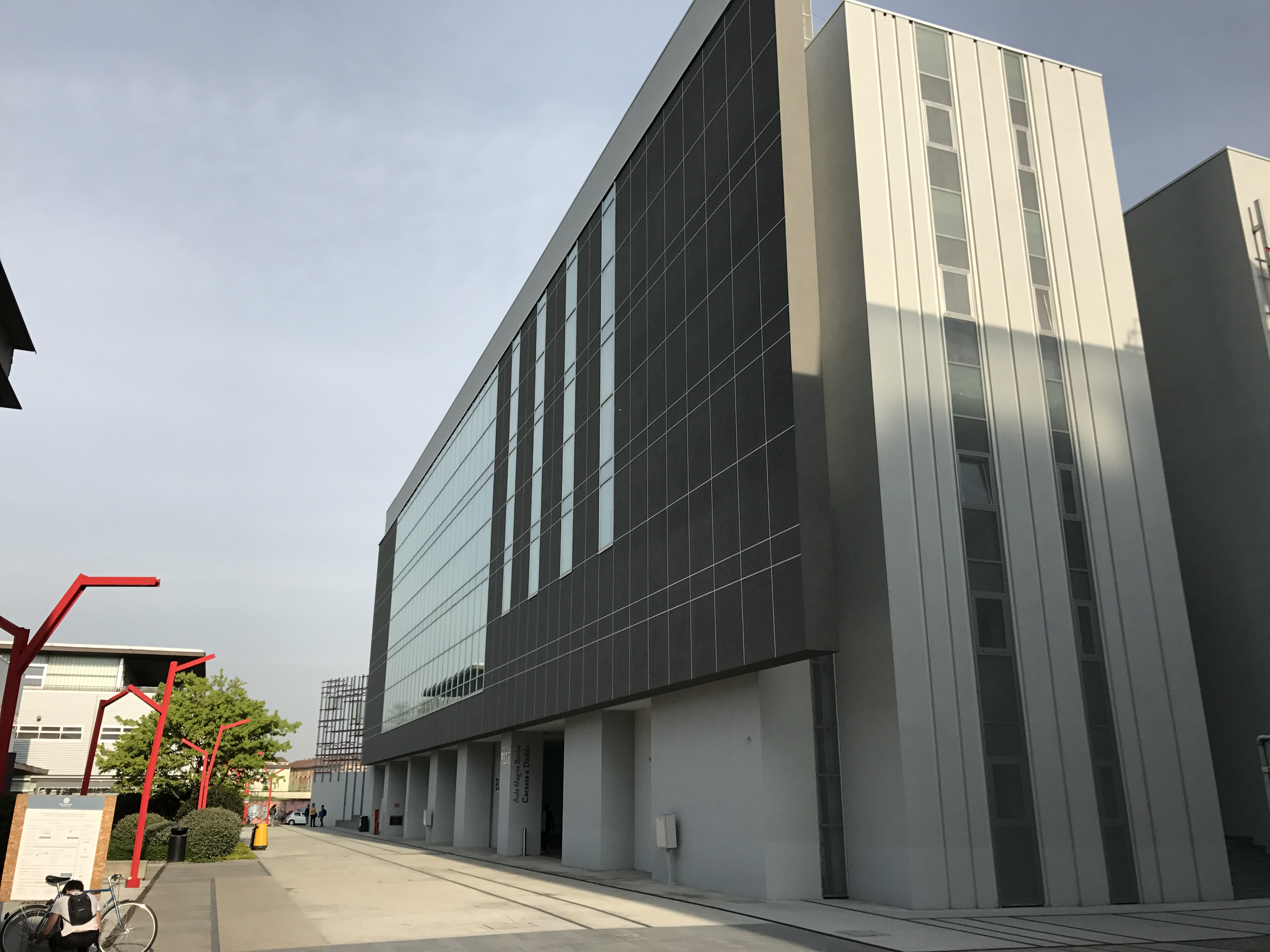
Polytechnic University-Bovisa campus

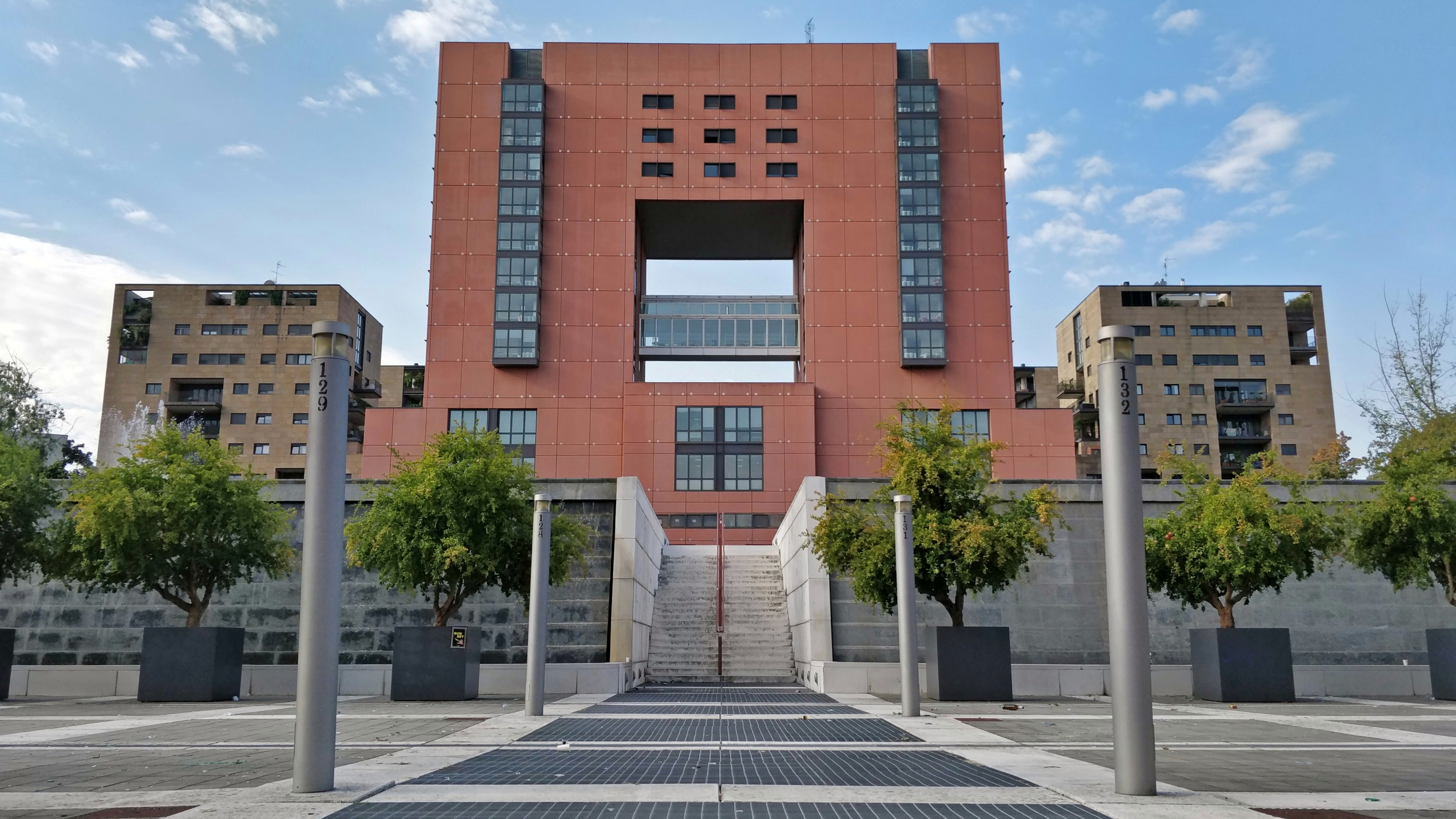
Bicocca University

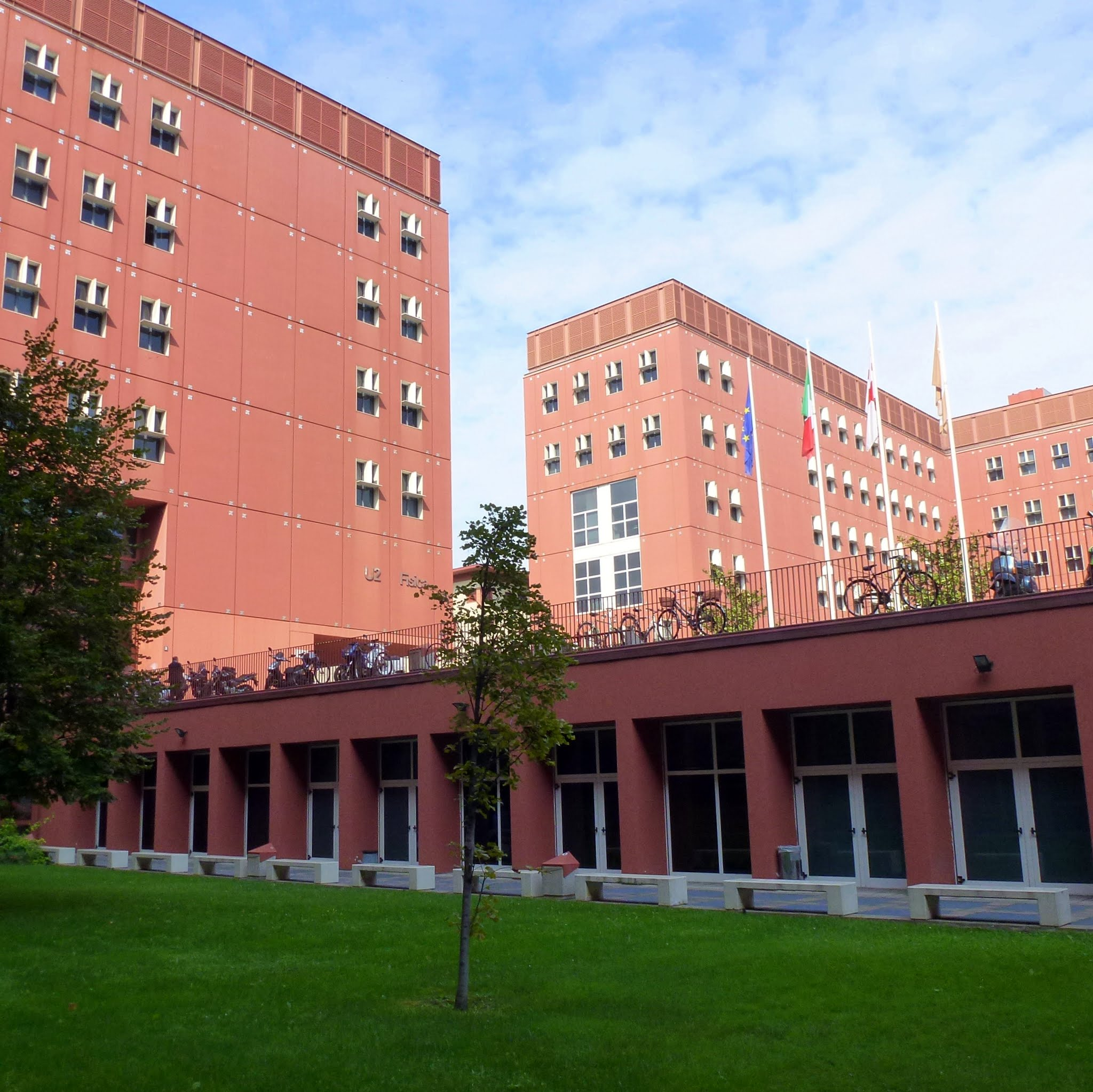
Bicocca University

== Parks and gardens ==
Library of Trees in Porta Nuova district
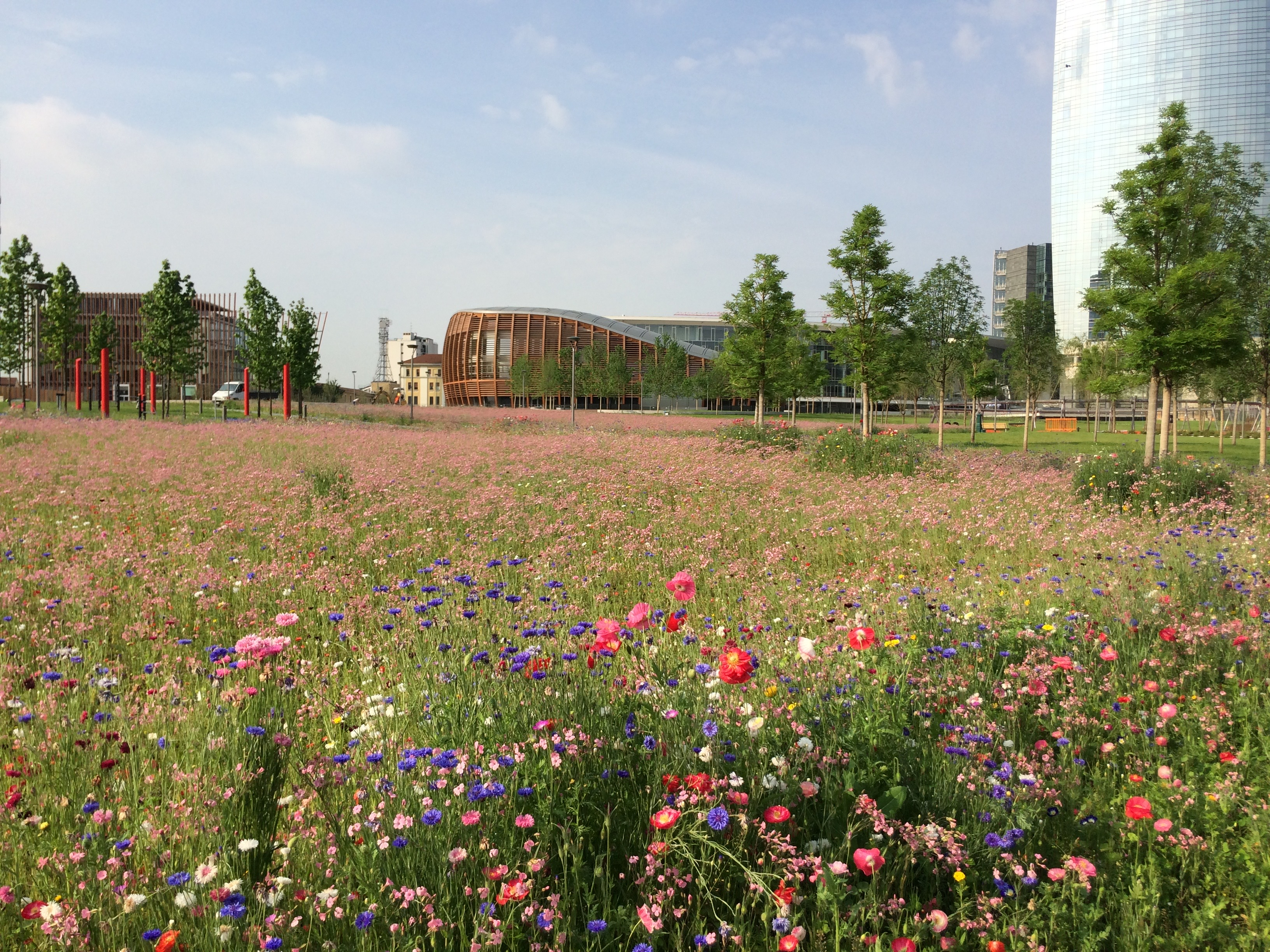
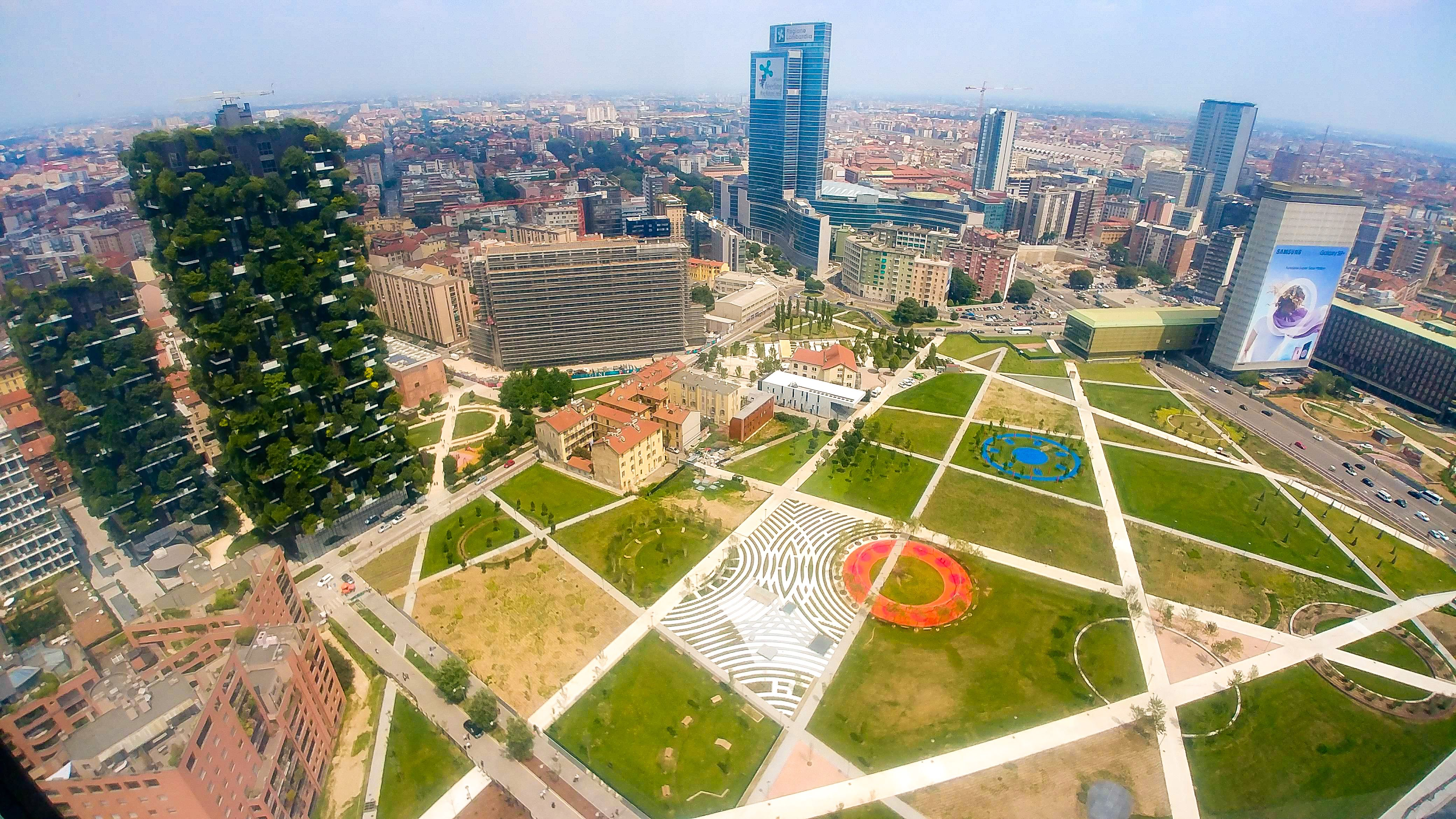

In this borough there are many public parks and gardens:

- Library of Trees (90,000 sq), opened in 2018, conceived as a vegetation library which houses more than 100 different species, 500 trees arranged in 22 rings and 135,000 other plants. In the same area, on the occasion of Expo 2015, was temporally created the big Agnes Denes' Wheatfield;
- Northern Park of Milan (3,200,000 sq), opened in 1975;
- Bruzzano's wood (120,700 sq), opened in 1968;
- Nicolò Savarino park (31,590 sq), opened in 1990;
- Villa Litta park (76,400 sq), realized in 1687, opened as public park in 1927;
- The Cherry Hill (30,000 sq), opened in 2007;
- Wanda Osiris garden (22,100 sq), opened in 1991;
- Giacomo Della Porta garden (4,400 sq), opened in 1999;
- Porro and Jenner garden (1,500 sq), opened in 2000.

== Transport ==
Stations of Milan Metro in the Zone 9:

- Gioia, Garibaldi FS;
- Affori Centro, Affori FN, Comasina, Dergano, Maciachini, Zara;
- Bicocca, Bignami, Ca’ Granda, Garibaldi FS, Isola, Istria, Marche, Ponale, Zara.

Suburban railway stations in the Zone 9:

- Milano Porta Garibaldi
- Milano Lancetti
- Milano Bovisa

== Gallery ==
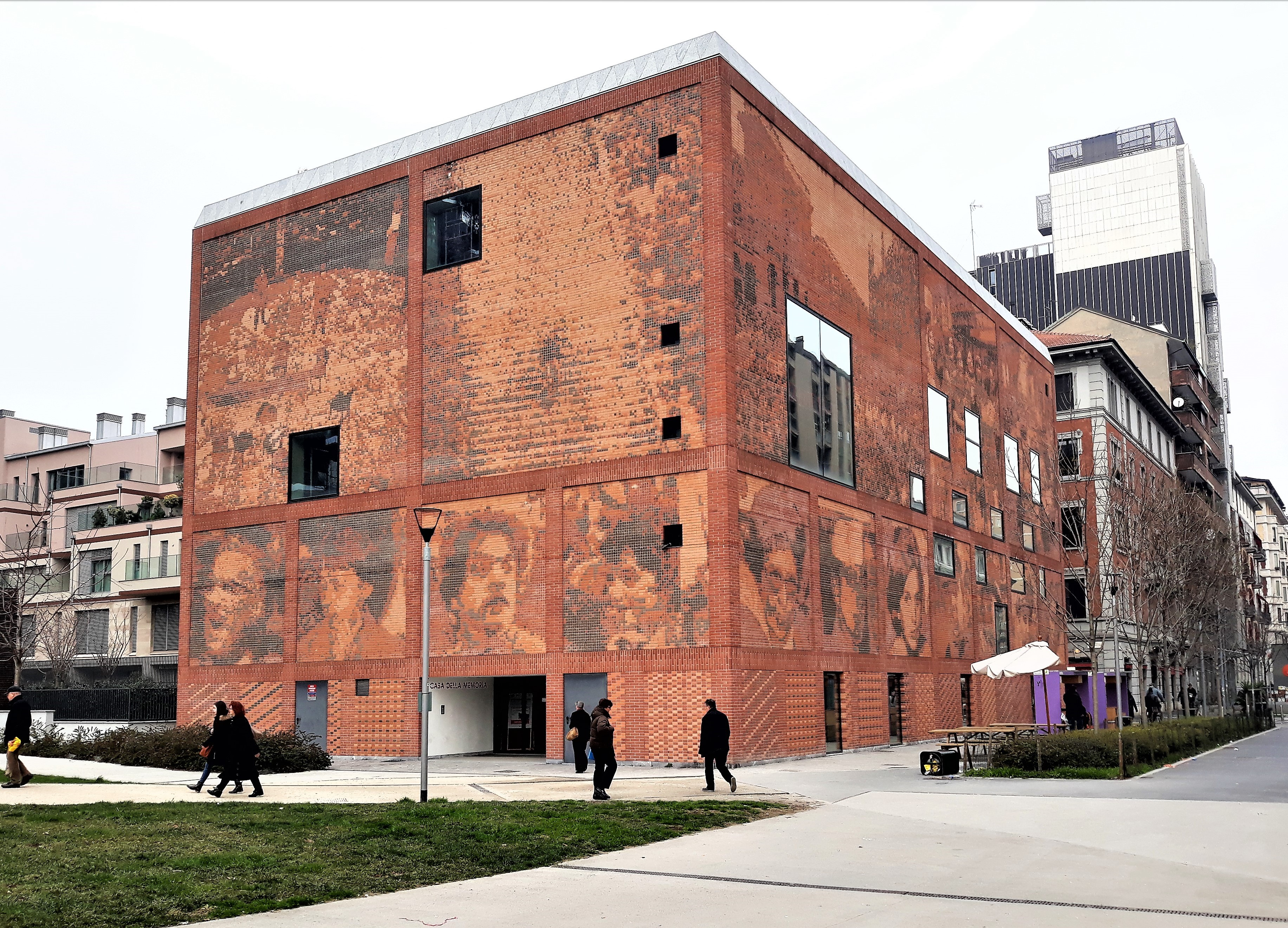
House of Memory Museum

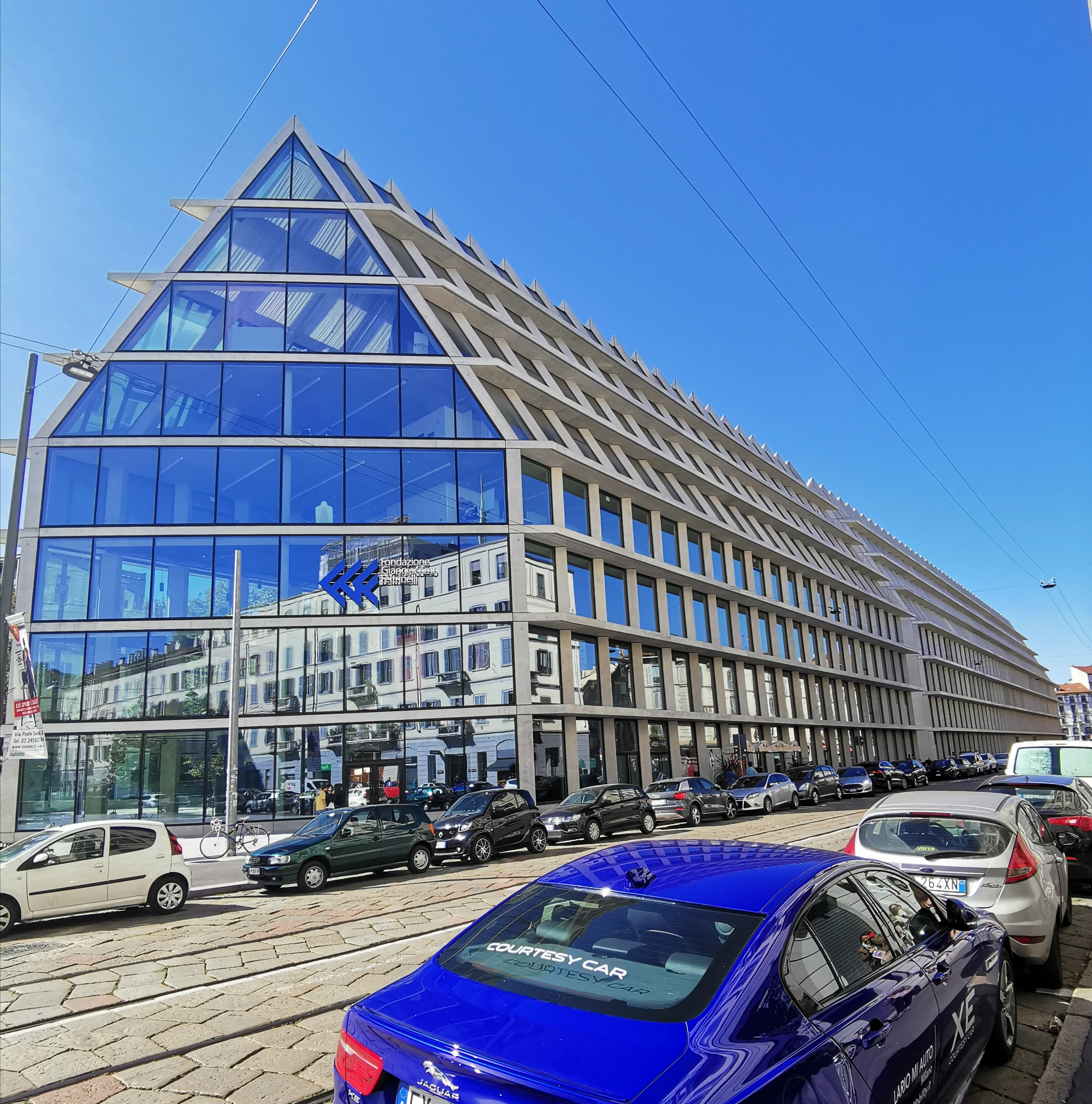
Feltrinelli headquarter and library

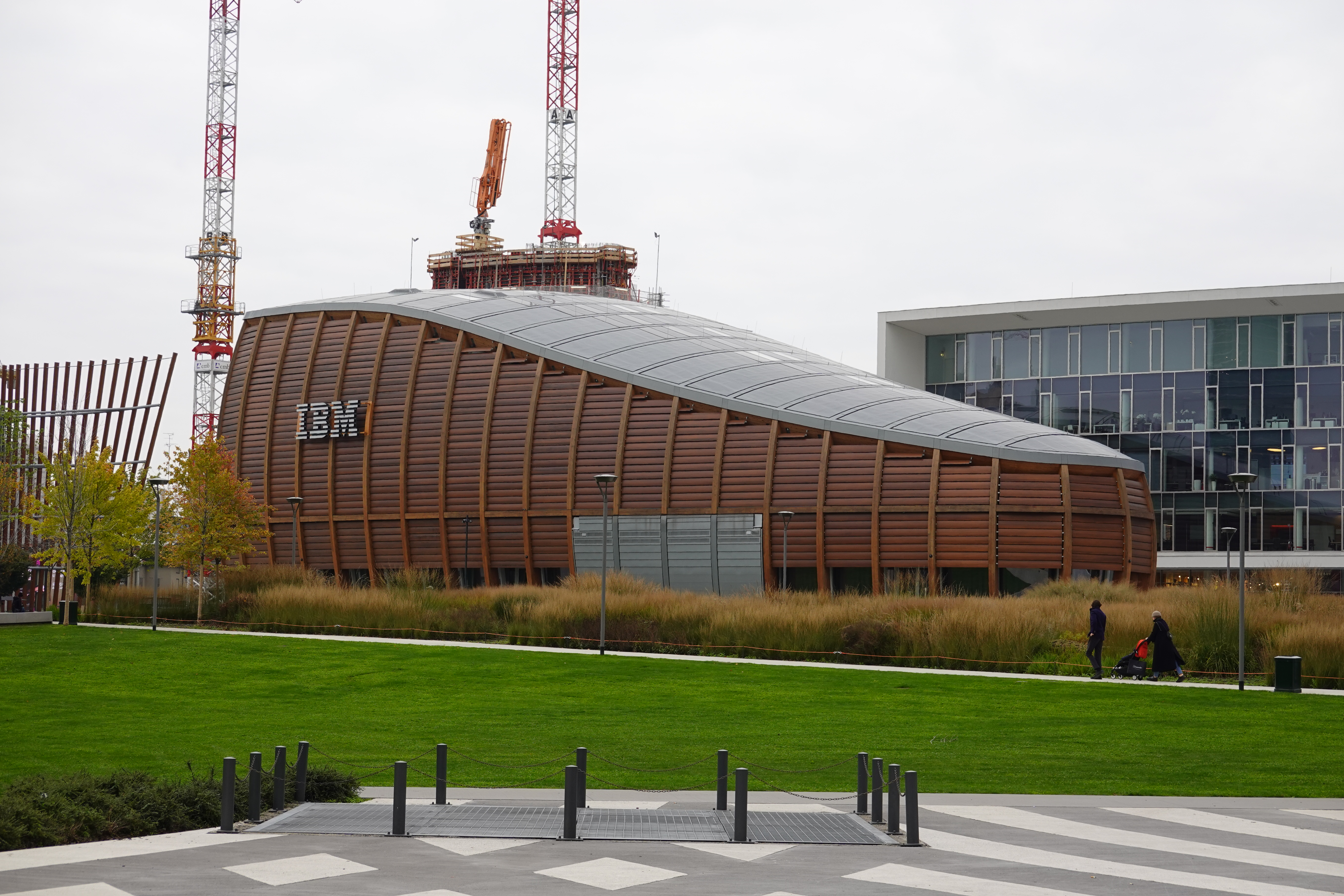
IBM Studios

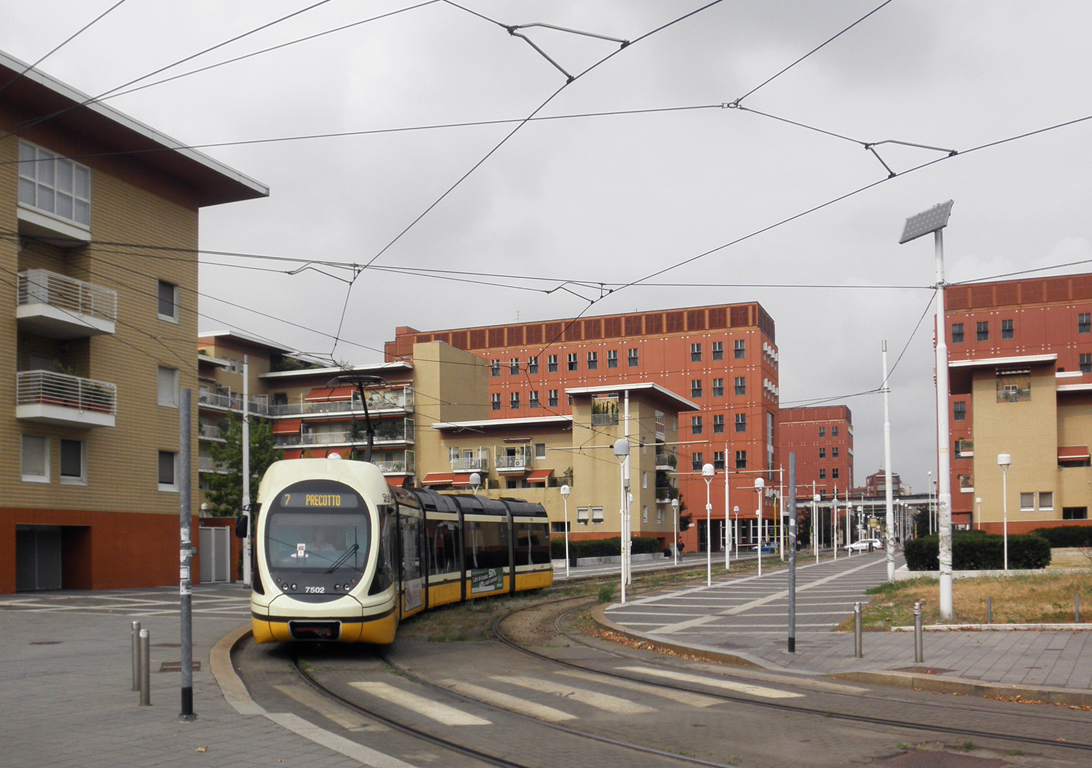
University of Milano-Bicocca campus

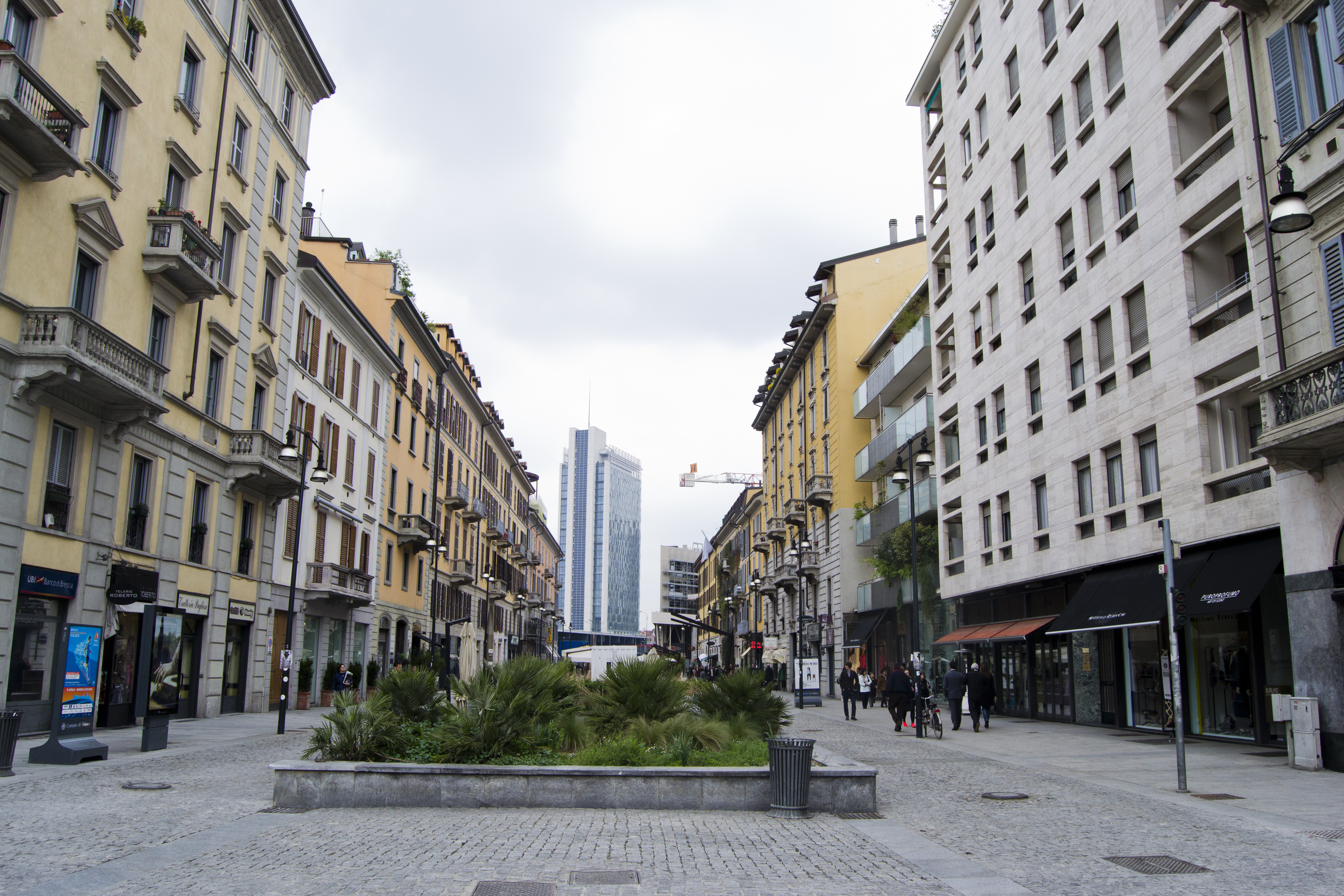
Corso Como shopping district

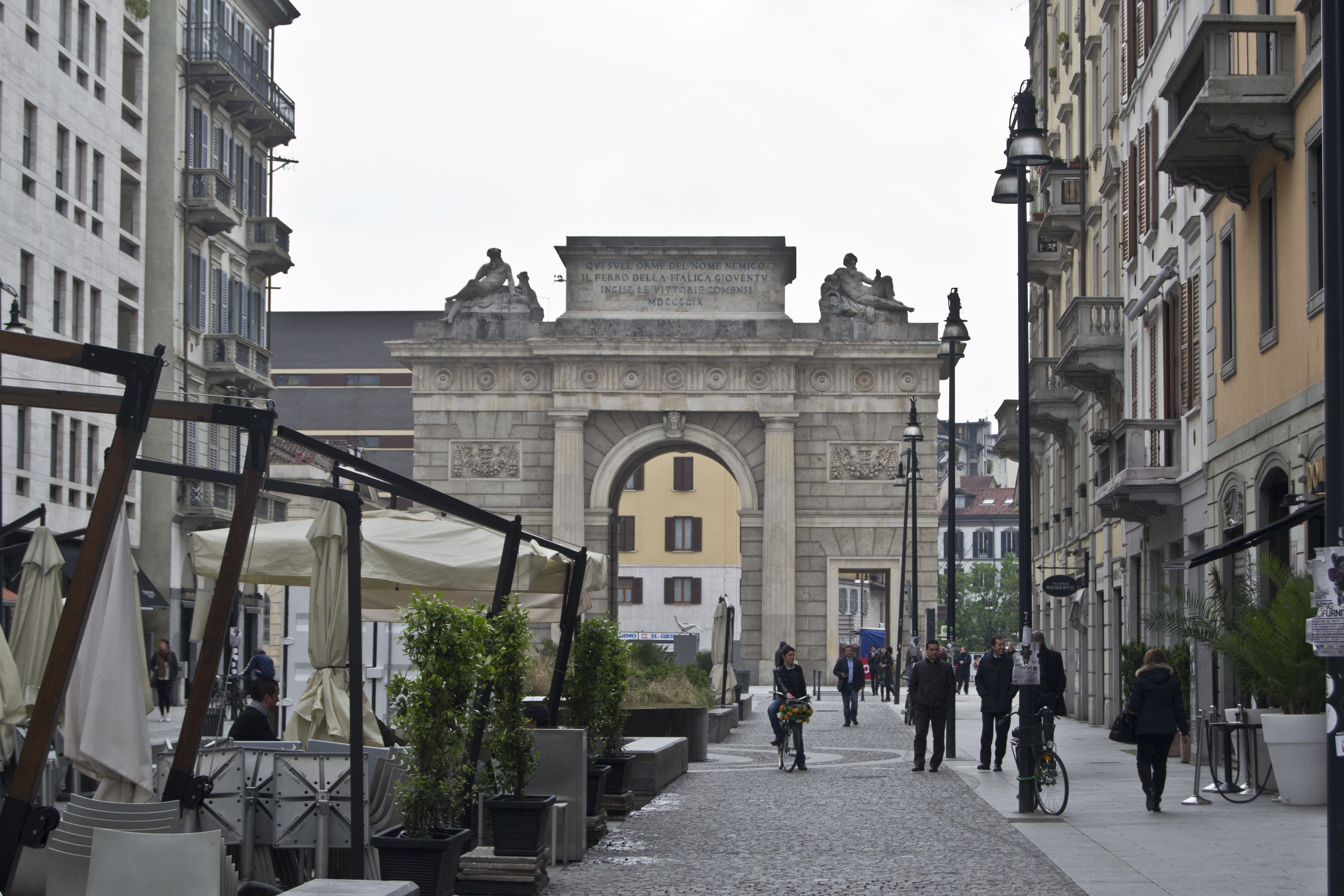
Corso Como and Porta Garibaldi

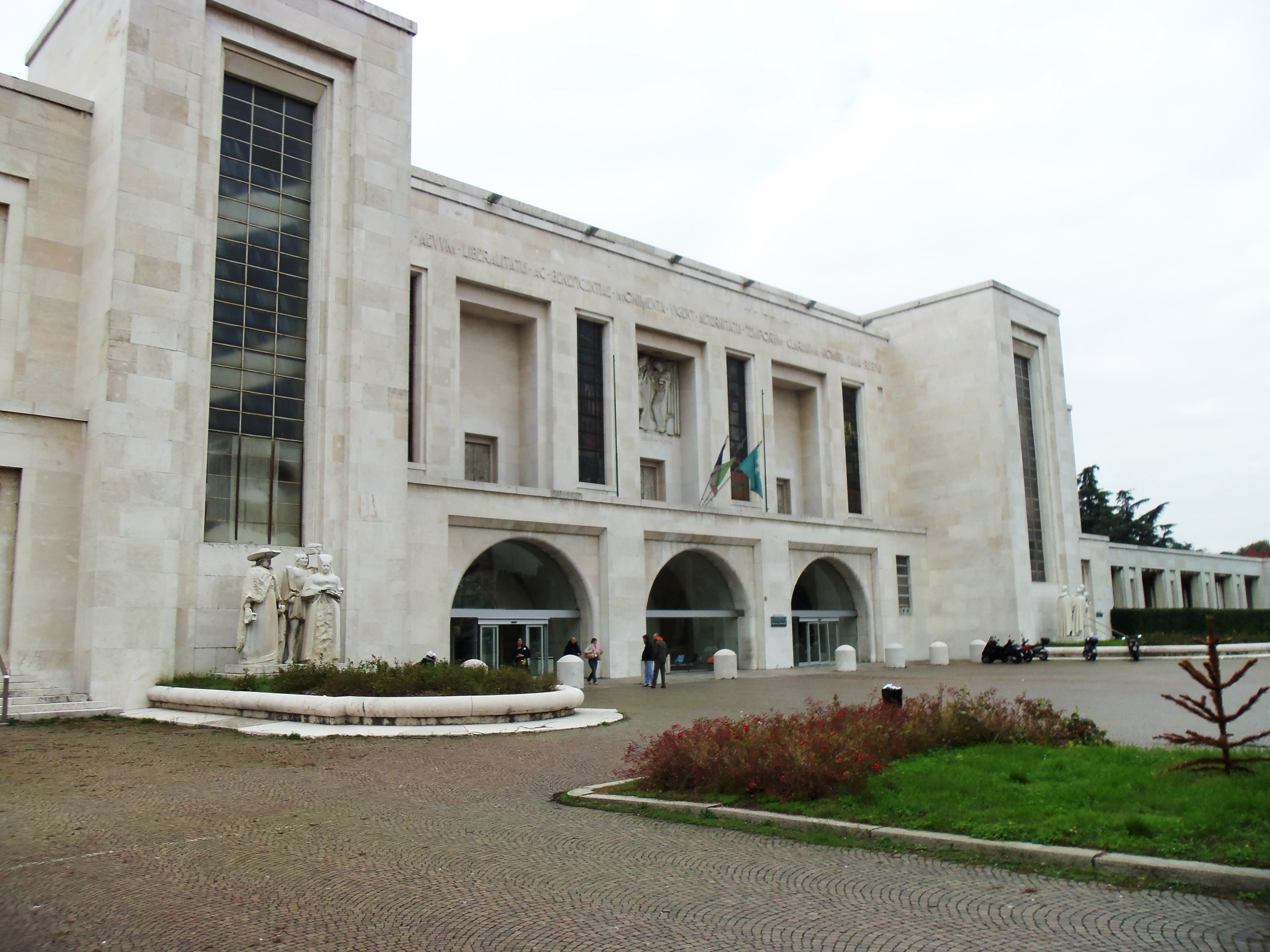
Main entrance of Niguarda Hospital, opened in 1939

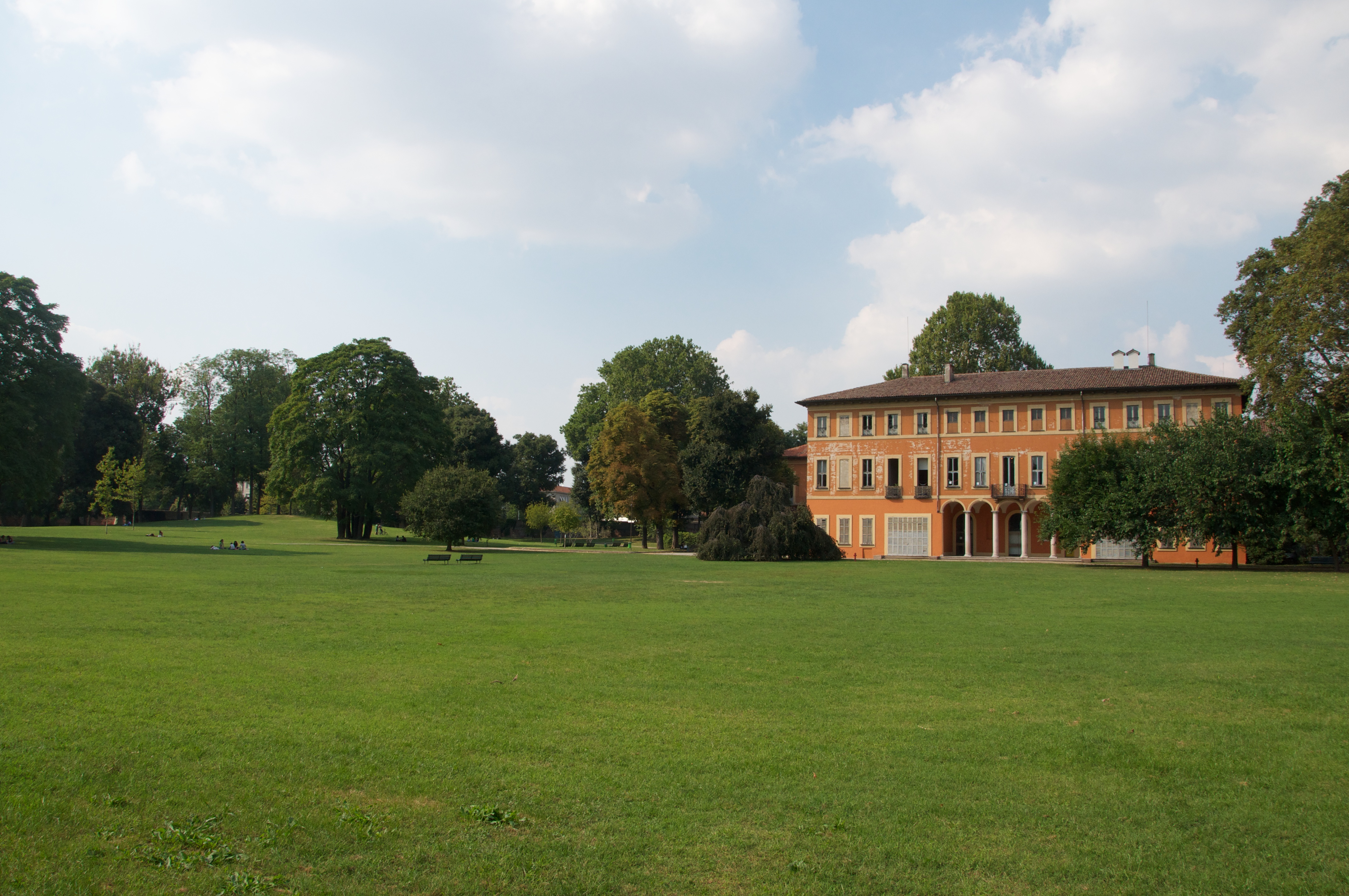
Villa Litta park

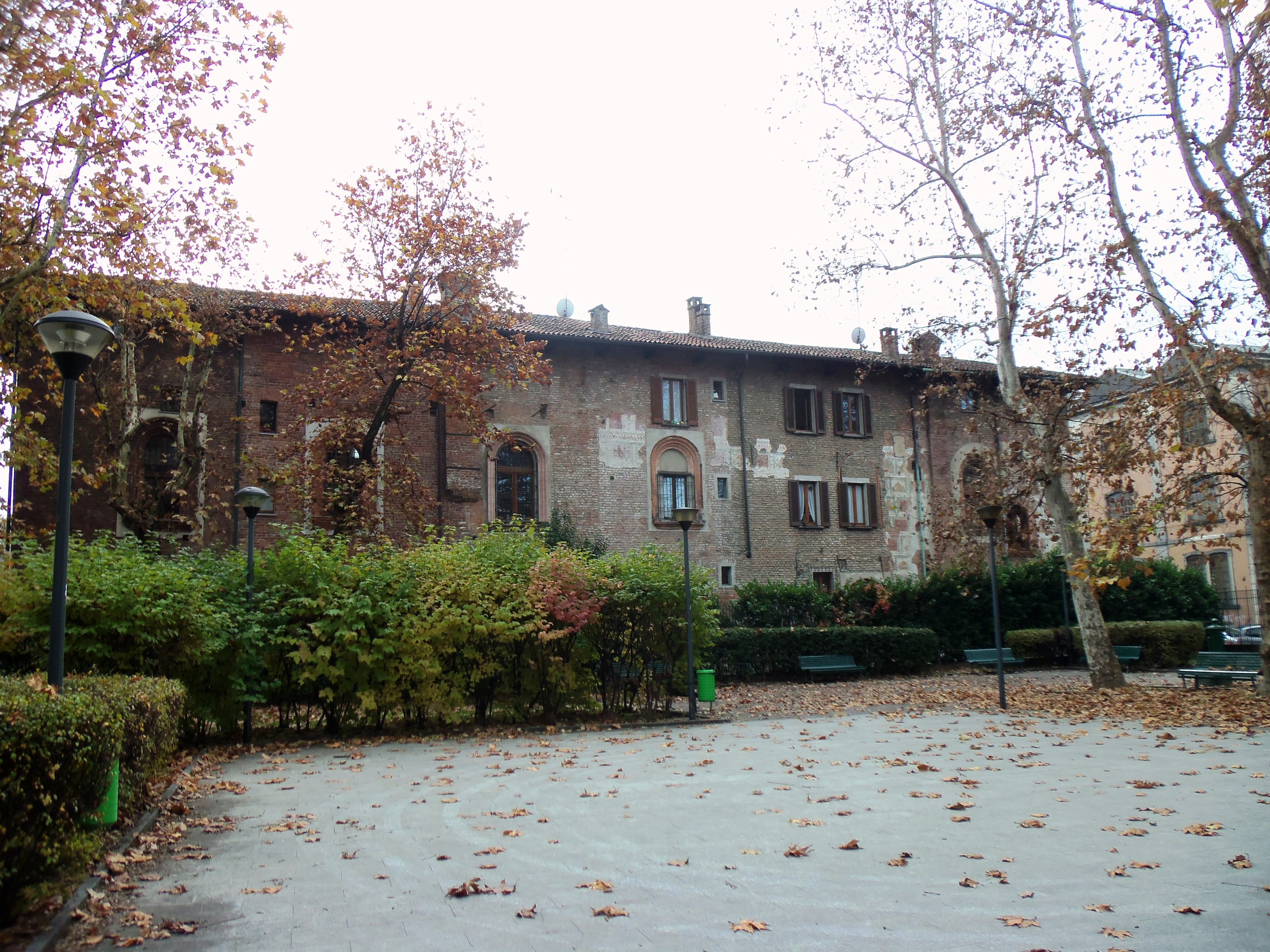
Porro and Jenner garden with the 15th century Boscaiola Farmhouse

== Maps ==
Map of Zone 9 of Milan
