= Bruzzano =

Coordinates: 45°31′43″N 9°10′24″E

- Quartier of Milan
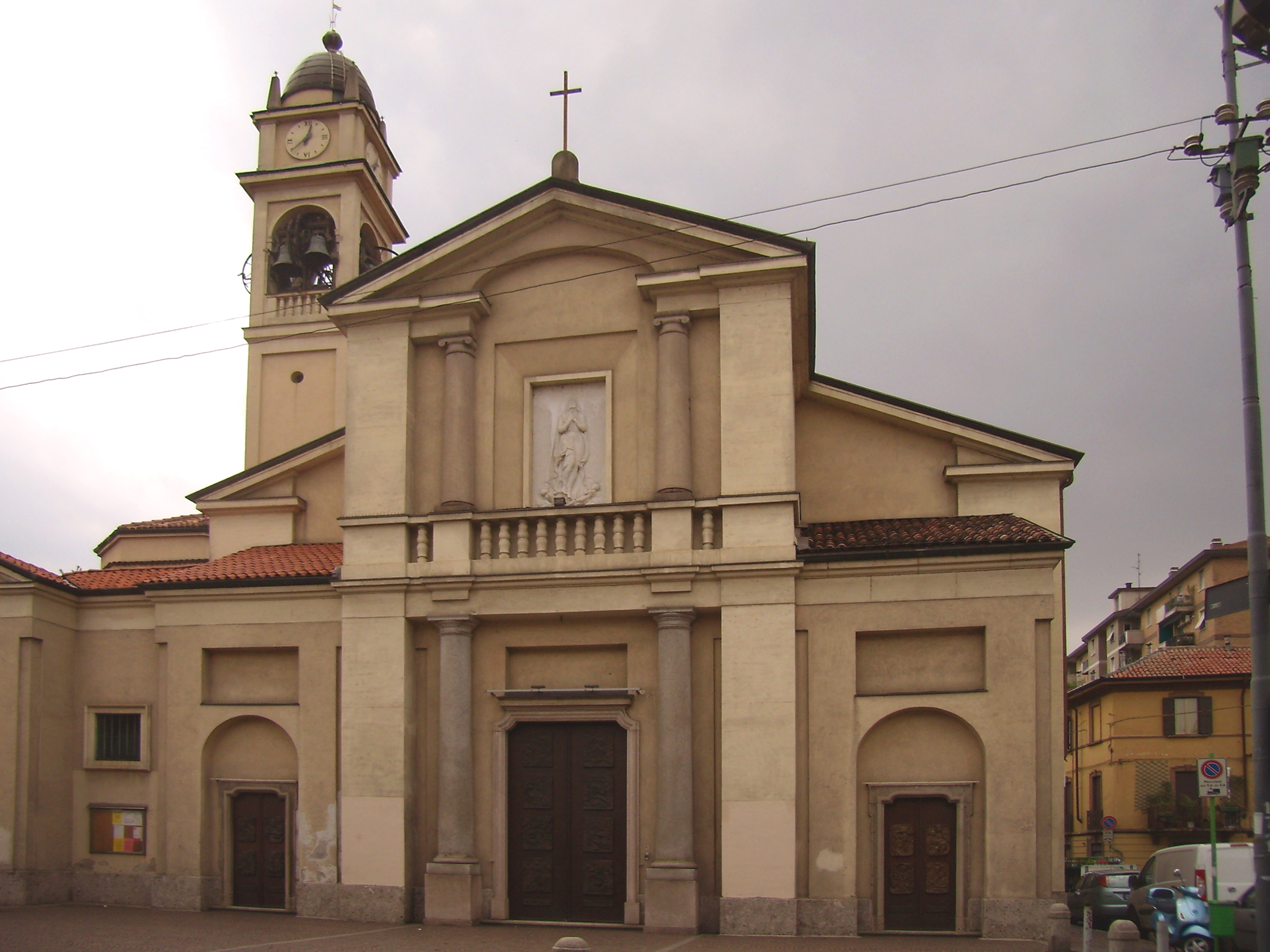
- Church of Santa Maria Assunta
- Interactive map of Bruzzano
- Country: Italy
- Region: Lombardy
- Province: Milan
- Comune: Milan
- Zone: 9
- Time zone: UTC+1 (CET)
  - Summer (DST): UTC+2 (CEST)

Bruzzano is a district (quartier) of Milan, Italy. It is an area located within Zone 9 of the city.

== Overview ==
Its name comes from the Latin Bruttianum, as the land owner of the agricultural fundus was a Roman citizen coming from Bruttium (today Calabria). In this region, in fact, there is now the namesake municipality of Bruzzano Zeffirio. The first written documents that testify the existence of an independent comune dates back to 1346, while the earliest proof of the existence of the church of Santa Maria Assunta dates back to 1011.

Bruzzano formed a separate municipality until 1869, when it joined Affori, Bresso and Dergano to form the Comune di Affori e Uniti (named again just Affori since 1912), which was then annexed in Milan in 1923.
