= Affori FN (Milan Metro) =

Milan metro station

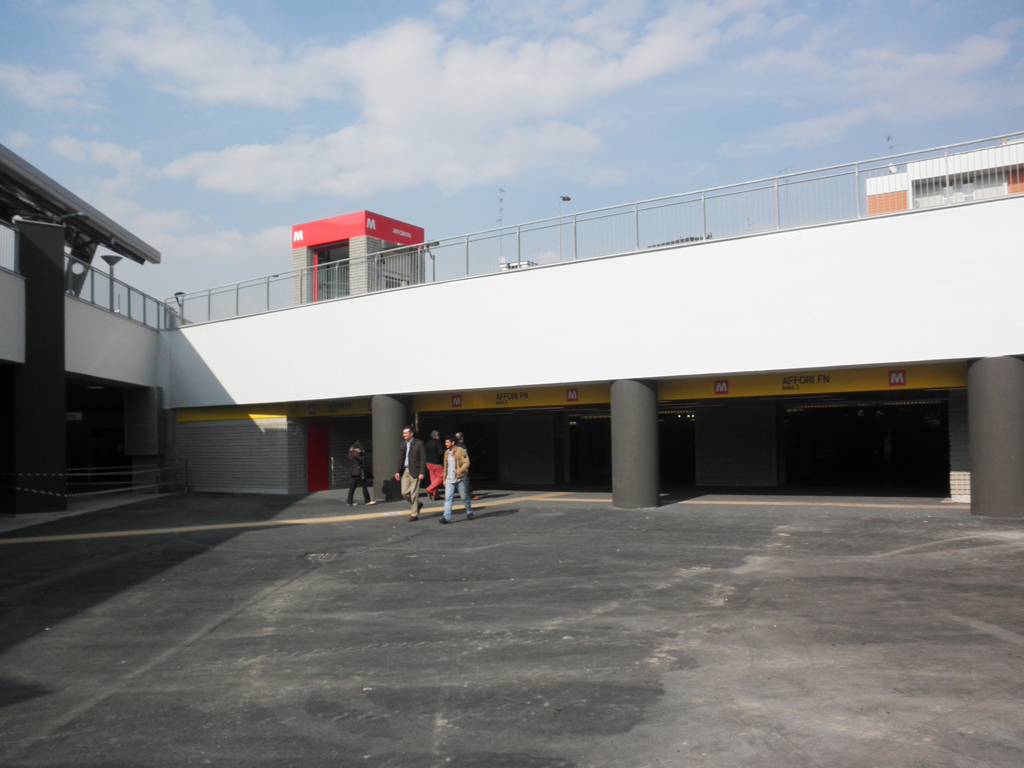

General information
- Location: Via Alessandro Astesani, Affori, Milan
- Coordinates: 45°31′18″N 9°10′07″E
- Owner: Azienda Trasporti Milanesi
- Platforms: 2
- Tracks: 2
- Connections: Milan Affori railway station

Construction
- Structure type: Underground
- Accessible: Yes

Other information
- Fare zone: STIBM: Mi1

History
- Opened: 26 March 2011; 15 years ago

Services
Preceding station	Milan Metro	Following station
Comasina Terminus	Line 3	Affori Centro towards San Donato
Location
- Location within Milan Location within Lombardy Location within Northern Italy Location within Italy

Affori FN is a station on Line 3 of the Milan Metro, in Italy, which opened on March 26, 2011, twenty-one years after the opening of the original trunk of the line. It is one of the four stations on Line 3 opened to the public in 2011, forming the section between Dergano and Comasina.

This station is located on Via Alessandro Astesani, at the border of two northern districts of Milan, Affori and Comasina; and this is one of the two stations existing within Affori, the other being Affori Centro. Affori FN allows riders to change to lines S2 and S4 of the Milan S Lines operated by Ferrovie Nord Milano.

The station is underground, built in a single tunnel with two tracks.
