= Bovisa =

Coordinates: 45°30′05″N 9°09′50″E

- Quartiere of Milan
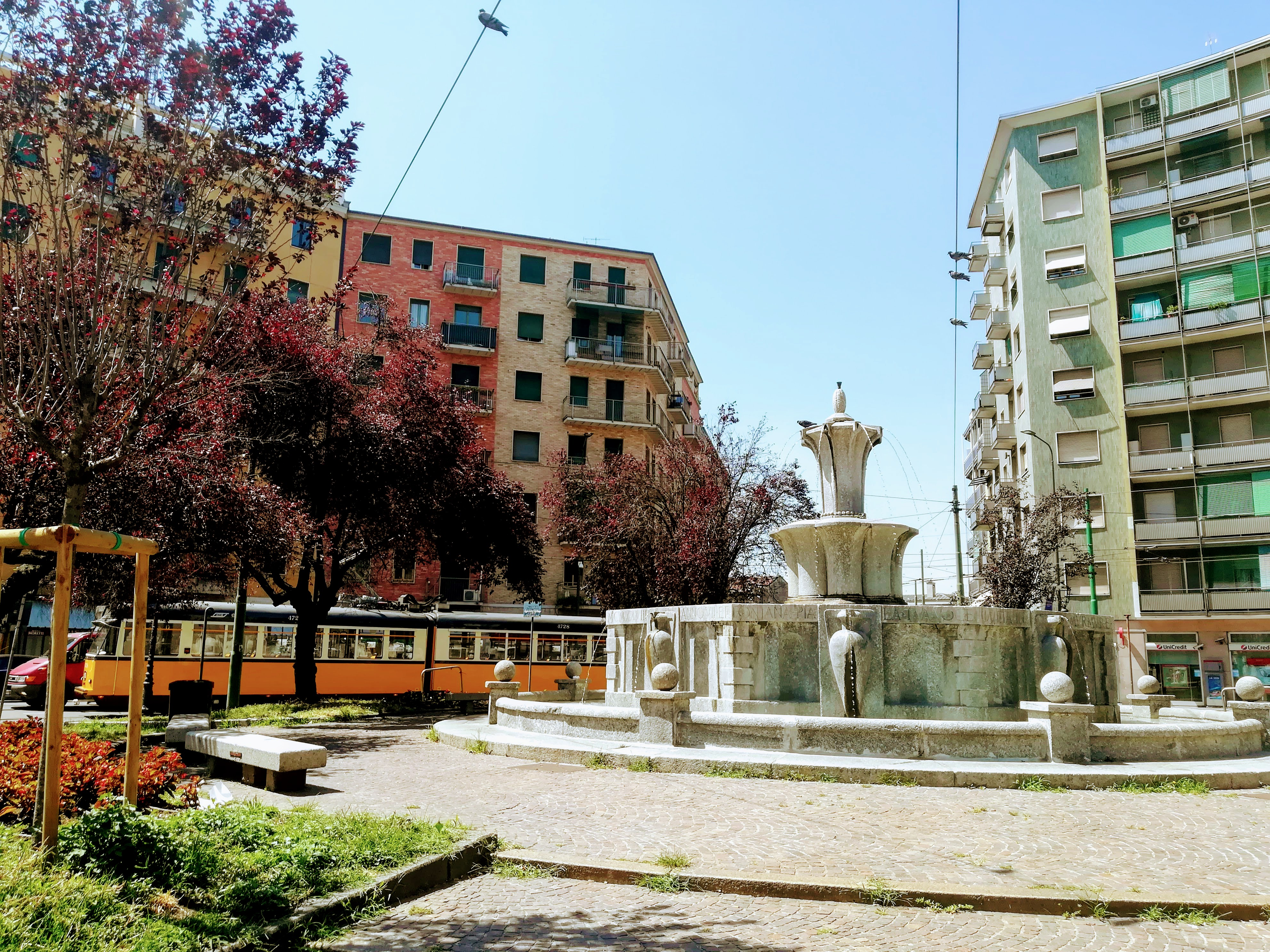
- Piazza Giovanni Bausan

- Country: Italy
- Region: Lombardy
- Province: Milan
- Comune: Milan
- Zone: 9
- Time zone: UTC+1 (CET)
  - Summer (DST): UTC+2 (CEST)

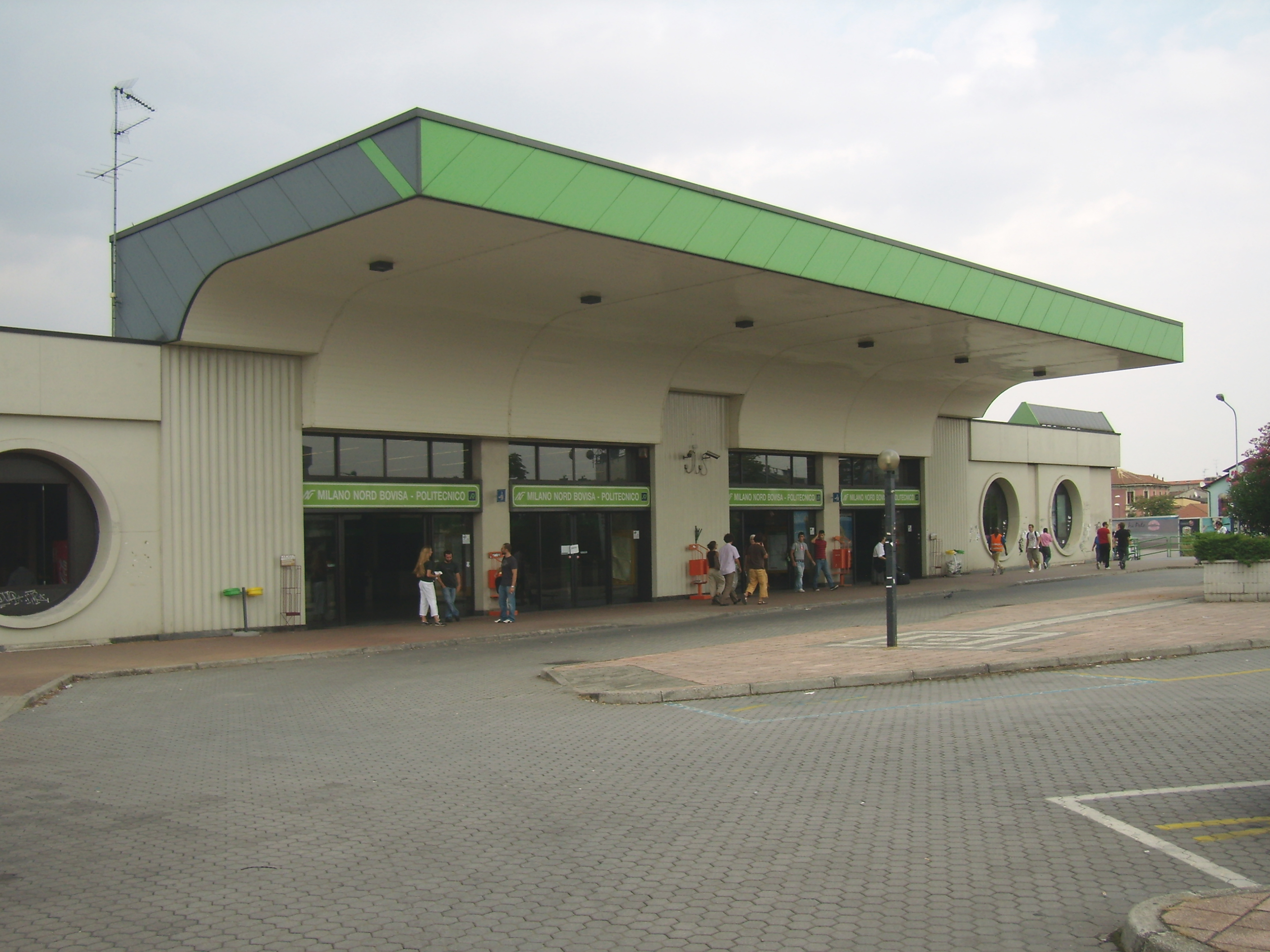
Bovisa railway station

Bovisa (Western Lombard: [buˈʋiːza], Italian: [boˈviːza]) is a district (quartiere) of Milan, Italy, located north of the city center, in the Zone 9. The name is supposedly derived from the Italian word bove, meaning ox, as the area developed from an ancient rural settlement.

== History ==
An industrial area in the outskirt of the city since the second half of the nineteenth century, Bovisa has undergone a thorough transformation since the 1950s, when most factories were dismantled to be moved farther from the expanding city center. After a period of decay, a process of renewal followed, which transformed the Bovisa into a mainly residential suburb. The district is now experiencing an upturn, thanks to the many activities which relocated in the zone. Among them, the Politecnico di Milano, with its Bovisa campus, played a major role. The campus features the schools of Design, Architecture and Industrial Engineering. The area has since gained notoriety as a design and art "melting pot". This trend was confirmed in 2006, when a new headquarters of the Triennale design and art museum, dedicated to modern art, was established in this area. Locals believe that Bovisa will be the next "hot spot" in Milan, seeing a re-emergence much like the nearby Isola district.

Remnants of 19th century factory buildings and industrial structures are a distinctive feature of the district. Prominent landmarks of the Bovisa include large abandoned gas holders that sparsely punctuate its skyline. The Architecture faculty of the Politecnico itself has its headquarters in a restructured factory building dating back to the early 20th Century.

== Public transport ==
The Bovisa railway station is a hub for the suburban railway network and is served by suburban lines S1, S2, S3, S4, S13, the Malpensa Express (to Malpensa Airport) and Trenord regional lines. Milan's above-ground trolley also circles the roundabout in Bovisa's center. Busses also run to and from the train station quite often.

== In popular culture ==
The Italian film director Ermanno Olmi has chosen this area as the setting of his novel, Il ragazzo della Bovisa ("The boy from the Bovisa"). Bovisa also played a role in the early Italian movie industry, as the first Italian film production studios such as Armenia Film and Milano Film (both established prior to Cinecittà in Rome) had their headquarters there.
