= Prato Centenaro =

Coordinates: 45°30′33″N 9°11′57″E

- Quartier of Milan
- Interactive map of Prato Centenaro
- Country: Italy
- Region: Lombardy
- Province: Milan
- Comune: Milan
- Zone: 9
- Time zone: UTC+1 (CET)
  - Summer (DST): UTC+2 (CEST)

Prato Centenaro is a district (quartier) of Milan, Italy. It is an area located within Zone 9 of the city.
