= Greco (district of Milan) =

- Quartiere of Milan
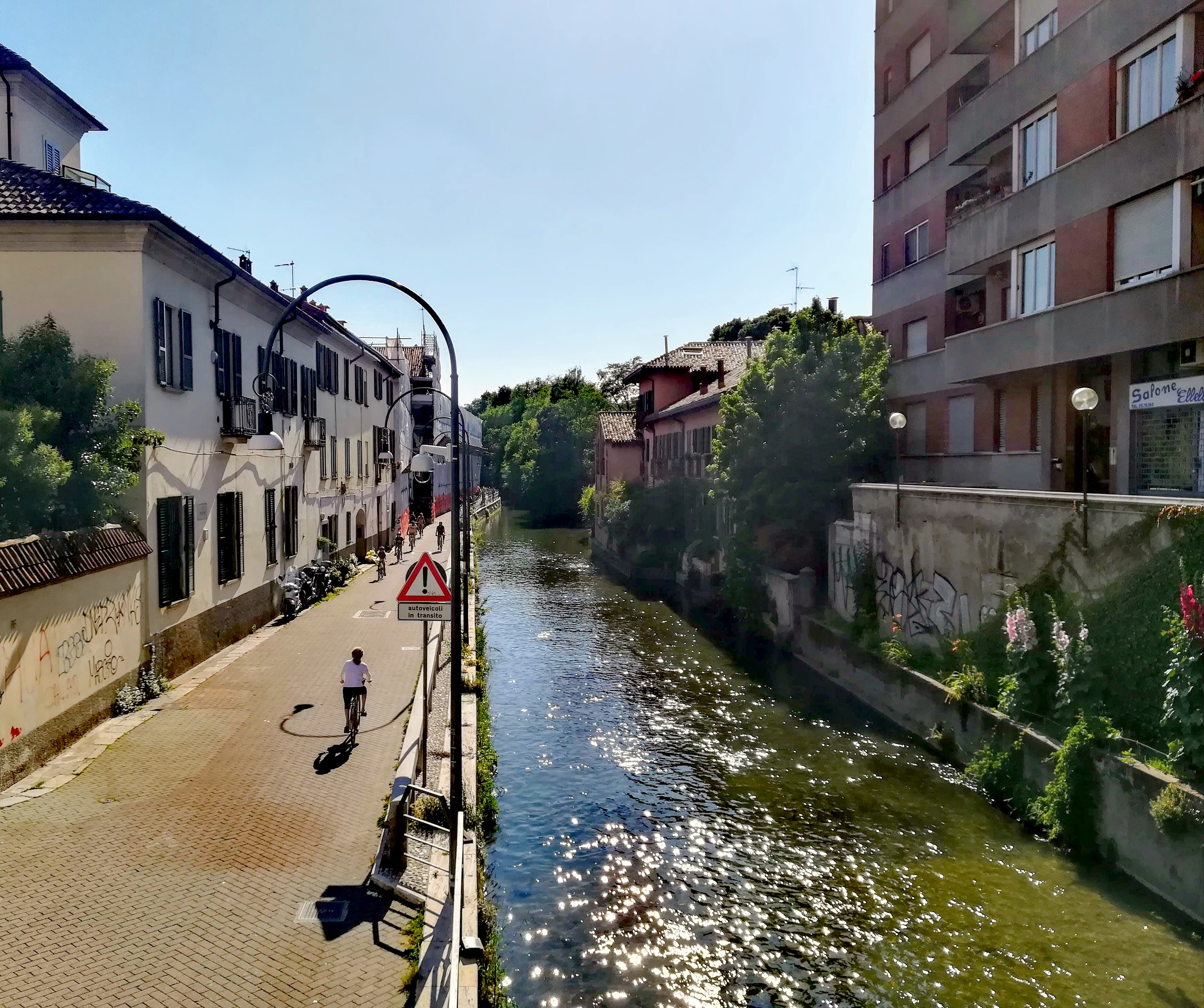
- View of the Naviglio della Martesana from Viale Monza towards Greco.
- Interactive map of Greco
- Coordinates: 45.502174°N 9.211543°E
- Country: Italy
- Region: Lombardy
- Metropolitan city: Milan
- Comune: Milan
- Zone: 2
- Time zone: UTC+1 (CET)
  - Summer (DST): UTC+2 (CEST)

Greco is a district (quartiere) of Milan, Italy, part of the Zone 2 administrative division, located north-east of the city centre. Before being annexed to the city of Milan in 1923, it was an independent comune (municipality) named Greco Milanese.

The architecture and urban layout of Greco still reveal its origins as a small rural borgo. Several old cascine (the typical country house of Lombardy) are still in place and have been restored to meet modern standards while retaining their original overall style.

== History ==
As Greco is the Italian word for 'Greek', it has been suggested that the name refer to an old Greek settlement in the area; nevertheless, scholars tend to believe that the place was actually named after the Greco family that used to live here at least until the 12th century.

A settlement in Greco is reported since at least the reign of Julius Caesar. In the Middle Ages, Greco was an independent comune; the place is mentioned in Alessandro Manzoni's The Betrothed as a small group of cascine. In 1753, Greco merged with Segnano. The resulting comune was named "Greco Milanese" in 1863. In 1923, Greco was annexed to Milan along with 12 other comunes. The boundaries of Greco changed over time; the Greco Pirelli train station, for example, has this name because in 1910, when it was built, it was inside the boundaries of the Greco Milanese comune; nowadays, it is considered part of the Bicocca district rather than the Greco district.

== References in popular culture ==
The area of Greco has been used as a setting in a number of Italian television production and movies, such as Romanzo popolare (1974), La piovra, season 3 (1987), and Sotto il vestito niente 2 (1988). One of the best known cascine of Greco, Cassina de' Pomm (in Lombard language "Farmhouse of the apples") appears in several scenes of Maurizio Nichetti's movie Volere volare.

== Notable people ==
Clara Petrella (soprano) and Adriano Celentano (actor, singer, showman) were born in Greco.
