= Niguarda =

Coordinates: 45°31′01″N 9°11′31″E

- Quartier of Milan
- Interactive map of Niguarda
- Country: Italy
- Region: Lombardy
- Province: Milan
- Comune: Milan
- Zone: 9
- Time zone: UTC+1 (CET)
  - Summer (DST): UTC+2 (CEST)
- Postal code: 20162

Niguarda is a district (quartiere) of Milan, Italy. It is an area located within Zone 9 of the city. It was an independent village until 1923, then became part of the city after the Giunta Mangiagalli (1917).

The Niguarda Hospital, a major teaching and research hospital founded in 1939, is located in the neighborhood.

== Monuments ==
Piazza Gran Paradiso in the Niguarda district features a war memorial fountain (Monumento ai Caduti) by artist Dante Parini. The monument is officially protected by the local cultural heritage superintendency.

== See also ==
- Niguarda Hospital
