= Affori Centro (Milan Metro) =

Milan metro station

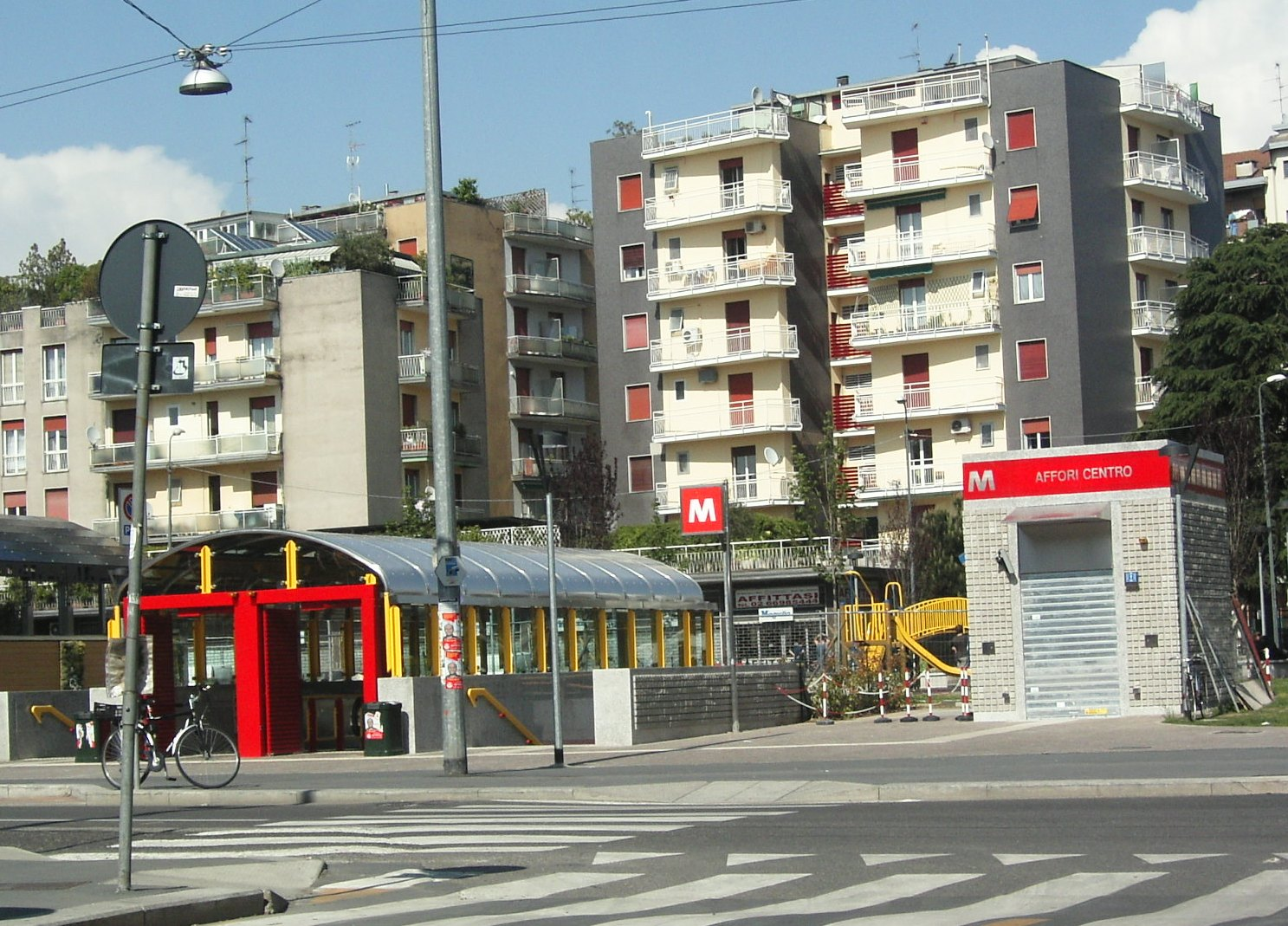

General information
- Location: Via Pellegrino Rossi, Affori, Milan
- Coordinates: 45°30′49″N 9°10′26″E
- Owner: Azienda Trasporti Milanesi
- Platforms: 2
- Tracks: 2

Construction
- Structure type: Underground
- Accessible: Yes

Other information
- Fare zone: STIBM: Mi1

History
- Opened: 26 March 2011; 15 years ago

Services
| Preceding station | Milan Metro | Following station |
|---|---|---|
| Affori FN towards Comasina | Line 3 | Dergano towards San Donato |
Location
- Location within Milan Location within Lombardy Location within Northern Italy Location within Italy

Affori Centro is a station on Line 3 of the Milan Metro which opened on March 26, 2011, twenty-one years after the opening of the original trunk of the line. It is one of the four stations on Line 3 opened to the public in 2011, forming the section from Dergano to Comasina.

This station is located on Via Pellegrino Rossi, at the centre of the Affori district; and it is one of the two stations existing within the district, the other being Affori FN, which allows riders to change to the regional rail services of Ferrovie Nord Milano.

The station is underground and has two platforms, one on each side of a double-track tunnel.
