= Dergano =

Coordinates: 45°30′09″N 9°10′38″E

- Quartier of Milan
- Interactive map of Dergano
- Country: Italy
- Region: Lombardy
- Province: Milan
- Comune: Milan
- Zone: 9
- Time zone: UTC+1 (CET)
  - Summer (DST): UTC+2 (CEST)

Dergano is a district of Milan, Italy. It is an area located within Zone 9 of the city.

From 1798 to 1808, Dergano existed as a separate comune.

Dergano is centered on its parish church, San Nicola in Dergano.

== See also ==
- Dergano (Milan Metro)
