= Comasina =

Coordinates: 45°31′35″N 9°09′40″E

- Quarter of Milan
- Interactive map of Comasina
- Country: Italy
- Region: Lombardy
- Province: Milan
- Comune: Milan
- Zone: 9
- Time zone: UTC+1 (CET)
  - Summer (DST): UTC+2 (CEST)

Comasina (Italian pronunciation: [komaˈziːna]) is a district (quarter) of Milan, Italy. It is an area located 6km north of the city within Milan Zone 9.
