= Segnano =

Coordinates: 45°30′25″N 9°12′27″E

- Quarter of Milan
- Interactive map of Segnano
- Country: Italy
- Region: Lombardy
- Province: Milan
- Comune: Milan
- Zone: 9
- Time zone: UTC+1 (CET)
  - Summer (DST): UTC+2 (CEST)

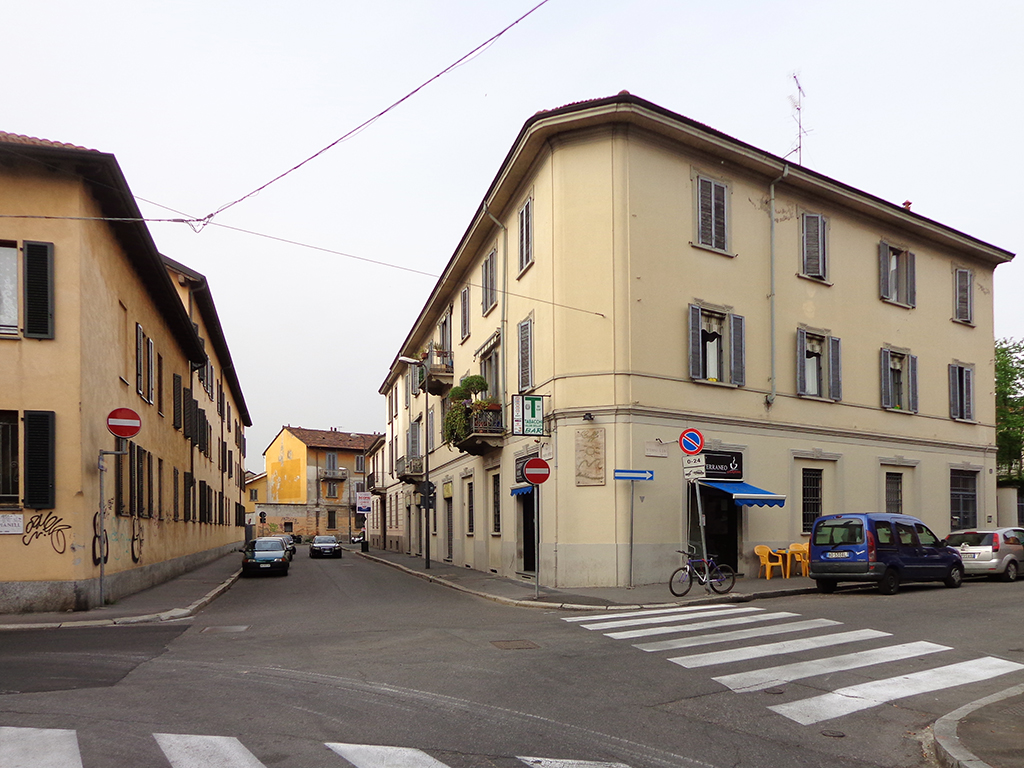

Segnano is a quarter of Milan, Italy. It is an area located within Zone 9 of the city. The population range from 5,854 in 1975 to 5,278 in 2015 with the males being about 49.8% and the females 50.2%. Segano covers an area of 0.563 km$2$.
