= Villa Litta Modignani, Milan =

Urban park in Milan, Italy

Coordinates: 45.5167°N 9.1677°E

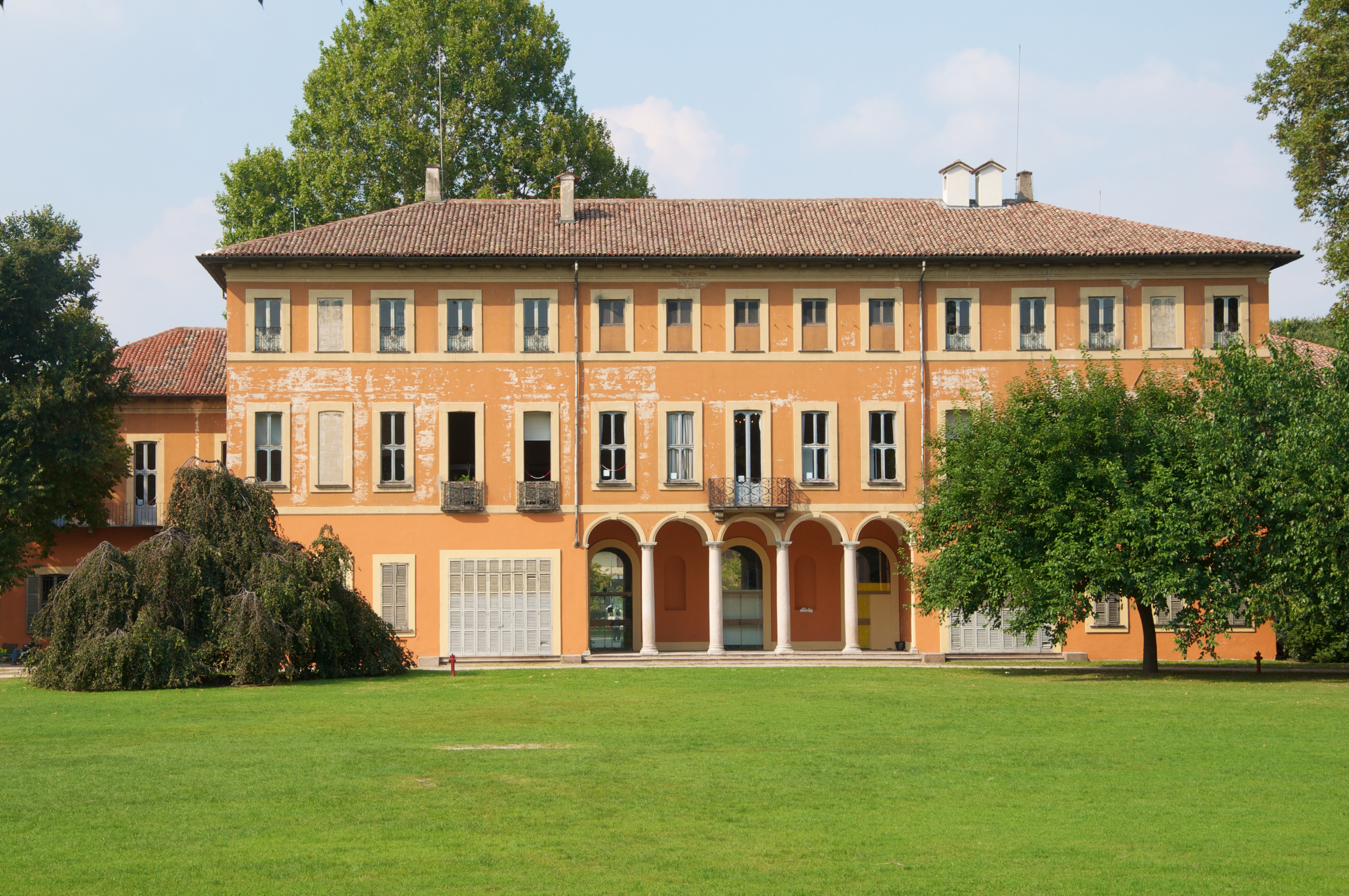
Villa Litta

The Villa Litta Modignani is a 17th-century rural palace and park located on Via Taccioli in the north suburbs of Milan, in the Province of Milan, Lombardy, Italy.

== History ==
Built as a rural villa in 1687 by Pietro Paolo Corbella, secretary of the Chancellor Segreta. Corbell had been named that year Marquis of Affori. It was in this villa that Pietro married Barbara Melzi. The building's exterior is simple; but the interiors were luxuriously decorated in a rococo-style. Marianna, the granddaughter of Pietro, only daughter of Carlo Corbello, died at the age of twenty-two and the property passed to her young husband, Francesco d'Adda. He remarried Teresa, the daughter of Marquis Pompeo Litta. She in turn widowed and married the Marquis Maurizio Gherardini. After some iterations, the family died out in 1836, and the villa was acquired by the Taccioli family, merchants of Milan.

After the mid-1850s under the patronage of the Count Girolamo Trivulzio and his daughter of the Princess Cristina Trivulzio Belgiojoso, the villa became a locus for writers and artists including Alessandro Manzoni and Francesco Hayez.

In 1905, the villa became property of a Litta-Modignani, who had married a grandson of Luigi Taccioli. The property was acquired by the province and in 1927, by the comune of Milan.

The stairwell opens to the right of the access atrium, and had a fresco depicting the Life of Diana painted by Giuseppe Nuvolone. The Salons also have landscapes by Rosa da Tivoli and a large ball-room with high wooden ceilings and quadrature.

In the 1850s, the formal gardens were recast as the looser "English Garden" by the Count Ercole Silva. The gardens were restored after 1958 by Egizio Nichelli. They are presently a public park. The villa is closed to visitors. While it retains some of the frescoes, it has lost nearly all the movable artworks, which once included a Madonna and Child by Bernardino Luini.
