= Dergano (Milan Metro) =

Milan metro station

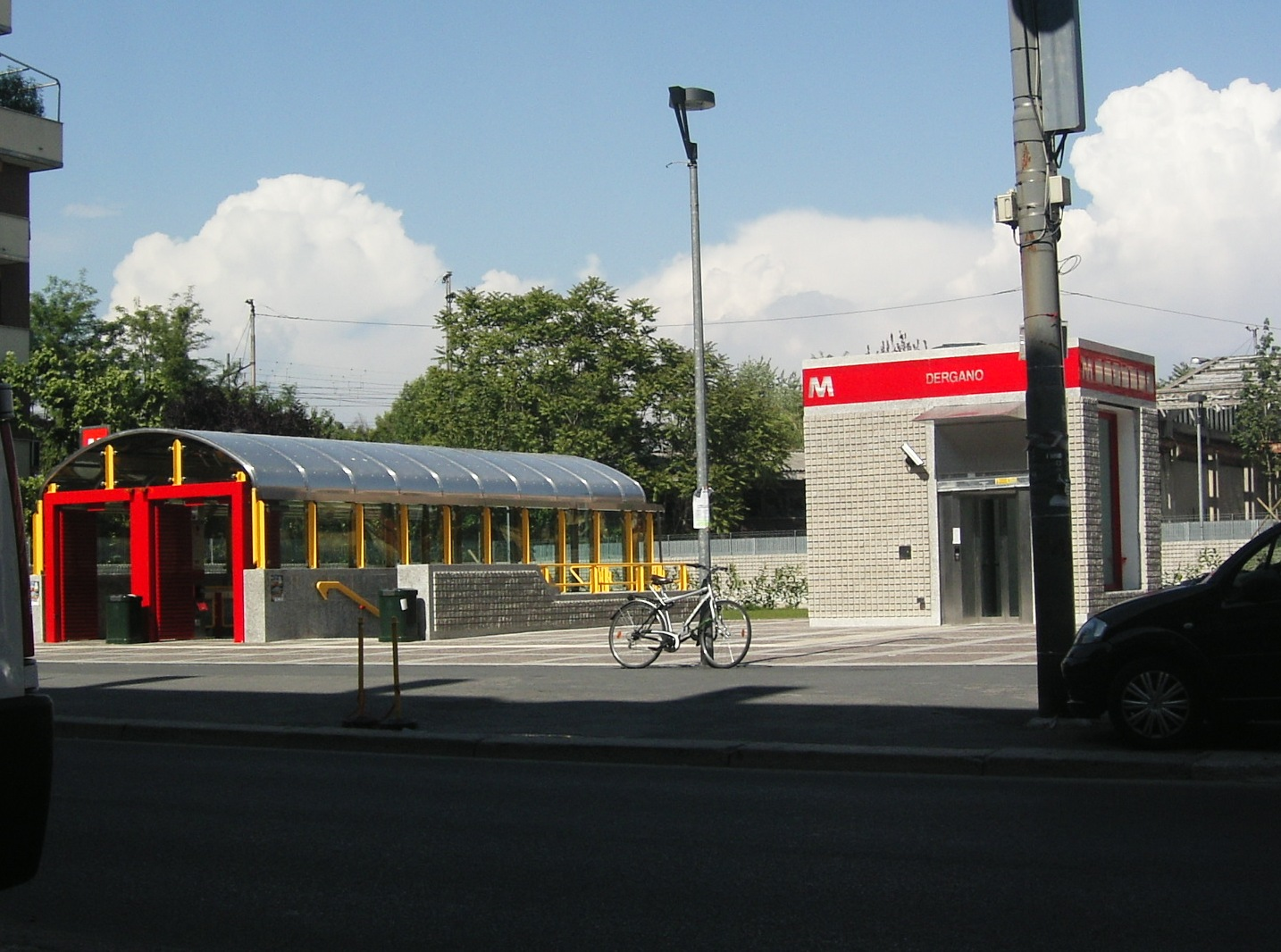

General information
- Location: Via Carlo Imbonati, Milan
- Coordinates: 45°30′20″N 9°10′47″E
- Owner: Azienda Trasporti Milanesi
- Platforms: 2
- Tracks: 2

Construction
- Structure type: Underground
- Accessible: Yes

Other information
- Fare zone: STIBM: Mi1

History
- Opened: 26 March 2011; 15 years ago

Services
Preceding station	Milan Metro	Following station
Affori Centro towards Comasina	Line 3	Maciachini towards San Donato
Location
- Location within Milan Location within Lombardy Location within Northern Italy Location within Italy

Dergano is a station on Line 3 of the Milan Metro which opened on March 26, 2011, twenty-one years after the opening of the original trunk of the line. It is the first station following Maciachini, the former northern terminus of the line. Dergano station was opened with other three stations, forming the branch from Dergano with Comasina.

The station is located on Via Carlo Imbonati, and is named after the Dergano district; it is not located in the square bearing the same name of the station.

The station is underground and has two platforms, one on each side of a double-track tunnel.
