= Bombing of Milan in World War II =

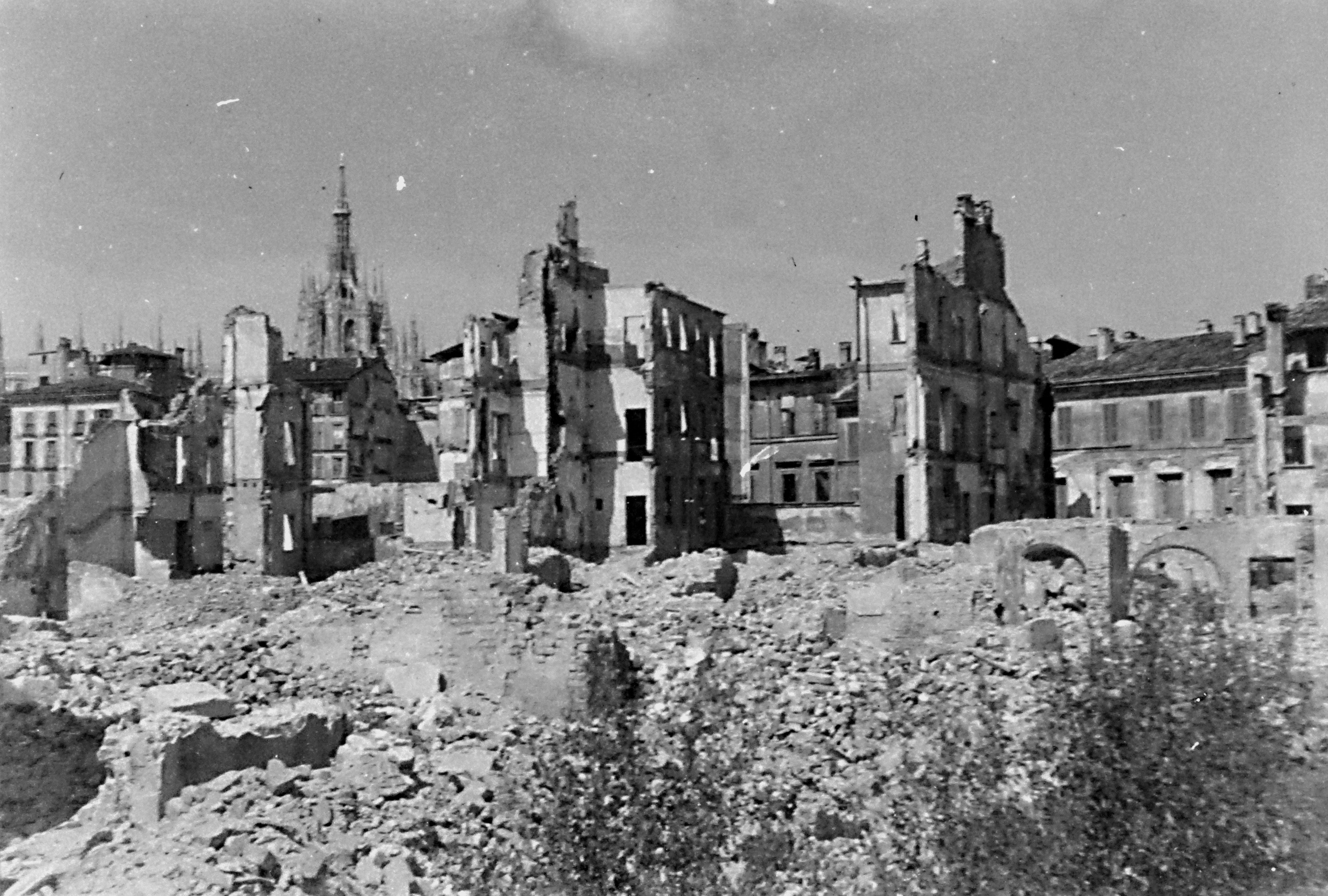
Buildings destroyed in Milan after the August 1943 bombings. Milan Cathedral in the background.

As the main economic and industrial center in Italy, and the country's second largest city, Milan was subjected to heavy bombing during World War II, being the most bombed city in Northern Italy and one of the most bombed cities in the country.

== The first raids, 1940 ==
During the first years of war (until 1943/1944), Milan could only be reached by bombers of the RAF Bomber Command coming from England. The first raids were precision bombings carried out by small numbers of planes, mainly with industrial objectives, which caused little damage and few casualties. The first raid happened in the night of 15/16 June 1940, five days after Italy entered the war; a few buildings were hit and one person was killed. On the following night, eight aircraft dropped bombs on the Caproni plant, causing little damage.

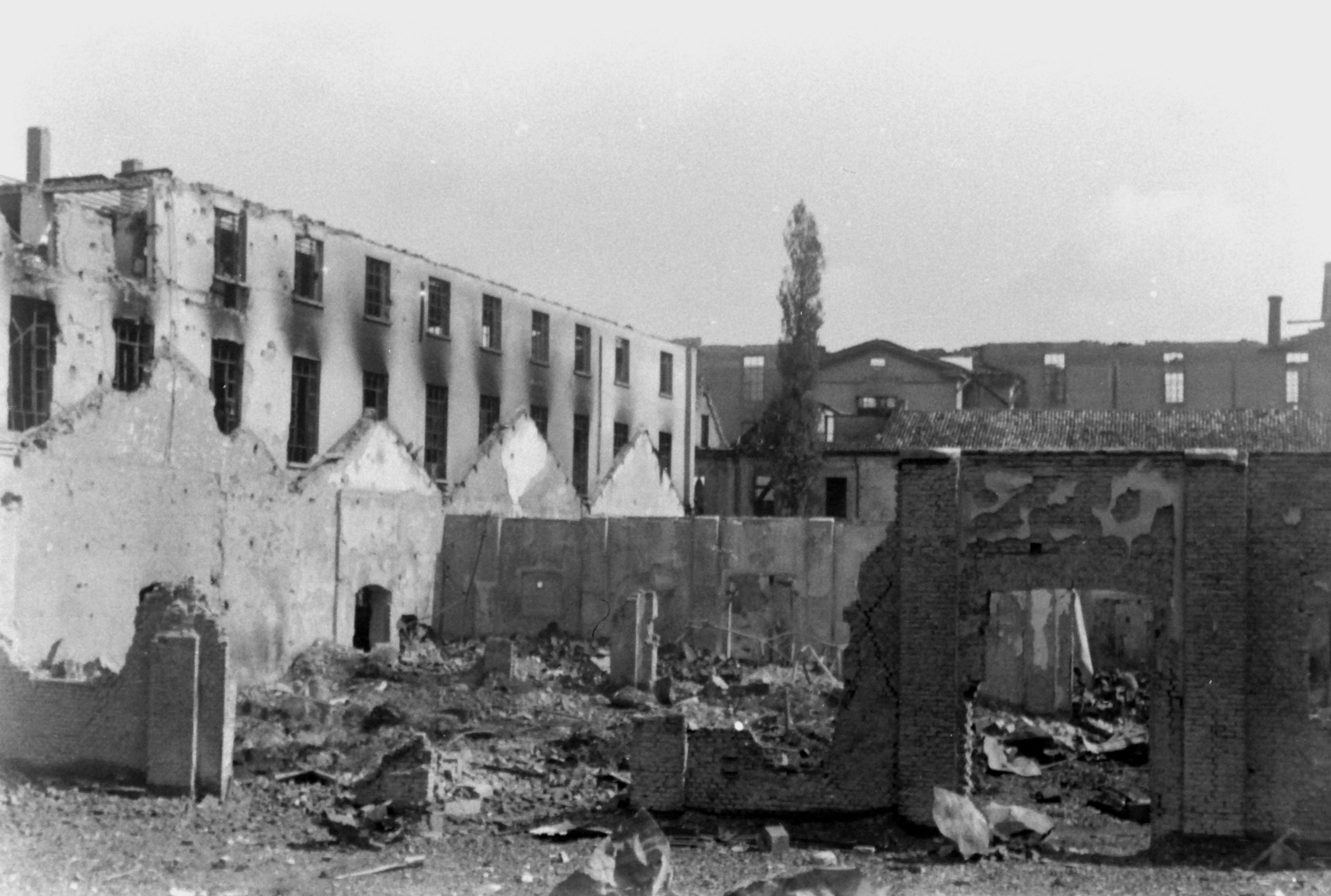
Destroyed factories in Milan

Bombings were renewed during August 1940. On the night of 13/14 August, three bombers dropped bombs and propaganda leaflets; the target was again the Caproni plant which however was not hit, while several buildings along a few streets were, with 15 killed and 44 wounded. On the night of 15/16 August another raid ensued, but the reaction of the anti-aircraft batteries shot down one Vickers Wellington bomber, and induced the others to drop their load over the towns of Merate and Mariano Comense. On the night of 18/19 August another bombing by four planes hit the Innocenti and Caproni plants and the Linate Airport. On the night of 26 August, eleven bombers bombed the Idroscalo.

One final bombing (by three planes) was carried out on 18/19 December 1940, targeting the Pirelli plant but instead causing slight damage to a few houses and killing eight people, wounding 16.

No bombings were carried out during 1941, and until the autumn of 1942.

== The area bombing, 1942–1943 ==
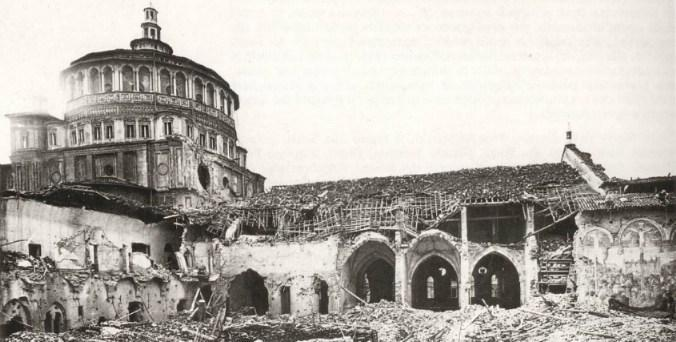
The Church of Santa Maria delle Grazie after the August 1943 bombings

After Bomber Command adopted area bombing as its main tactic, under the command of Sir Arthur Harris, and after a series of bombings on Germany during the spring and summer of 1942, in autumn 1942 an area bombing campaign was launched against the three cities of Italy's "industrial triangle", Milan, Turin, and Genoa.

While Turin and Genoa suffered seven and six raids, respectively, Milan was in this phase the least targeted city. Nonetheless, on 24 October 1942, 73 Avro Lancasters dropped 135 tons of bombs, including 30,000 incendiaries, over the city, in a rare case of RAF diurnal bombing. 441 buildings were hit, including the San Vittore jail, the headquarters of the Hoepli, two train stations and the Cimitero Monumentale. 171 people were killed and about 300 wounded. Four Lancasters were lost, only one of them to AA fire.

Although over 330 fires were started, it was judged that the incendiaries were much less effective than in previous raids on German cities; as it had already been shown by the bombing of Genoa, Italian cities were less vulnerable to firebombing than the German ones. This was mainly due to wider streets, which prevented fires from spreading across them, and minimal use of wood in the buildings.

Milan Cathedral was designated by Harris as the 'aiming point' for the area bombing. Although the cathedral was not hit during this raid, Harris's decision to centre the raid on a major religious building drew criticism from his superior, Charles Portal and some members of parliament. Another raid with 71 planes was planned for the following night, but poor weather dispersed the formation and only 39 bombers reached Milan (six were lost, and many others randomly dropped their bombs on several towns and villages of Lombardy), causing little more damage. Two more people were killed, and thousands started to flee from the city.

At the beginning of 1943 the Italian anti-aircraft defenses, which had proved not to be very effective, were joined by German Flak batteries. The success rate of the anti-aircraft fire, however, did not improve significantly.

After a pause of nearly four months, Milan suffered a new area bombing on the night of 14/15 February 1943, when 142 Lancasters dropped 110 tons of explosive bombs and 166 tons of incendiary bombs over the city. Several factories were damaged, including Alfa Romeo, Caproni, Isotta Fraschini and Breda; the Milano Centrale railway station and the Farini marshalling yard were also hit. Residential areas were also badly damaged, with 203 houses destroyed, 596 heavily damaged and over 3,000 slightly damaged; the headquarters of Corriere della Sera suffered heavy damage. Several historical buildings suffered various extents of damage, including the Royal Palace of Milan, the Teatro Lirico, the Basilica of San Lorenzo, San Giorgio al Palazzo and the Church of Santa Maria del Carmine. To extinguish the many fires, it was necessary to call firefighters from all neighbouring provinces and even from Bologna. 133 people were killed in the attack, 442 were wounded and over 10,000 were left homeless. Schools had to close down, and more citizens evacuated the city. The only RAF loss was one Lancaster shot down.

After this attack, Milan was not bombed for six more months, but at the beginning of August 1943, following the fall of Mussolini, it was decided to start a series of heavy bombings on the main Italian cities, to induce the Badoglio government to surrender. On the night of 7/8 August 1943, 197 bombers took off from bases in England to carry out a simultaneous bombing of Milan, Turin, and Genoa. Milan was bombed by 72 aircraft (two of which were shot down by AA fire), which dropped 201 tons of bombs, mainly incendiaries. Large parts of the city centre were set ablaze; 600 buildings were destroyed, with 161 victims and 281 wounded among the population. The only factory that was damaged was the Pirelli plant. The headquarters of the Corriere della Sera were hit again and partly destroyed; among the public and historical buildings that suffered heavy damage were the Sforza Castle, the Natural History Museum, the Villa Belgiojoso Bonaparte and Palazzo Sormani. The Pinacoteca di Brera was also hit. Public transport was no longer possible in the city centre, as most of the streets were obstructed by ruins or sprinkled with craters.

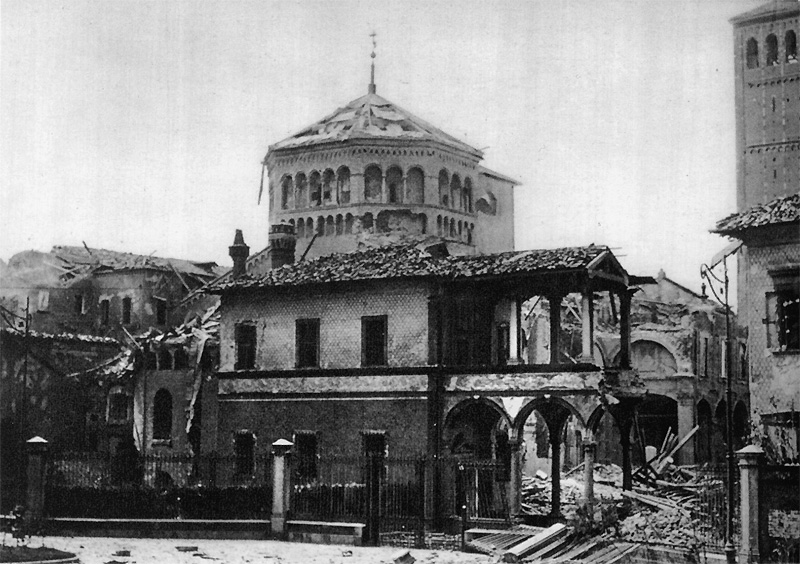
Damage of the Basilica of Sant'Ambrogio

On the night of 12/13 August 1943, Bomber Command launched its heaviest raid on Milan and any Italian city. 504 bombers (321 Lancasters and 183 Halifaxes) took off from English bases, and 478 of them reached Milan and dropped 1,252 tons of bombs (670 explosive bombs and 582 incendiary bombs), including 245 4,000-lb blockbusters and 380,000 incendiary devices, over the city. This was the second heaviest air raid ever suffered by an Italian city. The bombing caused massive fires in many parts of Milan; the fires drew air from the surrounding countryside, creating winds that reached a speed of 50 km/h, an event that usually heralded a firestorm, which however did not materialize (owing to the humid climate, in addition to the previously mentioned urbanistic traits typical of Italian cities, and the fact that the raid was heavy but not very concentrated). Most of Milan's most famous buildings were hit during the raid; the Sforza Castle was further damaged, Palazzo Marino (the city hall) and Santa Maria delle Grazie were partly destroyed, the San Fedele Church and the Galleria Vittorio Emanuele II suffered heavy damage. The Milan Cathedral was also hit by some bombs. The Alfa Romeo plant and the fair ground were also damaged. The death toll, although never fully ascertained, was an estimated 700 deaths; casualties were not higher because about 900,000 of the city's 1,150,000 inhabitants had already left after the previous attacks. Most of those who were still in Milan evacuated the city on August 13. The RAF lost three bombers. On the night of 14/15 August, fires were still raging when another bombing was carried out by 134 Lancasters (ouf of 140 which had originally taken off; one was lost), which dropped 415 more tons of bombs. Several factories (Breda, Pirelli, Innocenti, Isotta Fraschini) and the Farini marshalling yard were badly hit; the Sforza Castle and the Royal Palace were further damaged, and Teatro Dal Verme was partly destroyed, as was the Università Cattolica del Sacro Cuore. The Basilica of Sant'Ambrogio also suffered heavy damage. The few remaining citizens helped firefighters and UNPA (Unione Nazionale Protezione Antiaerea, National Anti-Aircraft Protection Union) in the attempts to control the fires, but the destruction of the aqueduct pipes hampered the efforts. The official death toll of this raid was of only nine killed, presumably due to the small number of people who were still in the city. On the following night, 186 Lancasters (13 more bombers did not reach the target; 7 were lost, mainly to Luftwaffe fighters on the way back) carried out a final raid, during which they dropped an additional 601 tons of bombs. Several districts suffered further damage; the cathedral was hit again, and the La Scala theatre and the Ospedale Maggiore were heavily damaged; the La Rinascente store was destroyed. 183 people were killed.

At this point, Bomber Command halted its attacks, as it was thought that the "persuasive" effect had been achieved, and further bombings could have instead fueled anti-British sentiment. The four August raids had caused over 1,000 dead and hit half of the buildings in the city, destroying or heavily damaging 15% of them and leaving over 250,000 people homeless. The work of 5,000 workers and 1,700 soldiers was needed to remove the ruins. Water, light and gas supply resumed within 48 hours, while public transport was nearly annihilated.

No more raids were carried out during the rest of 1943, and life in the city was slowly resumed.

== 1944–1945, the USAAF bombings ==
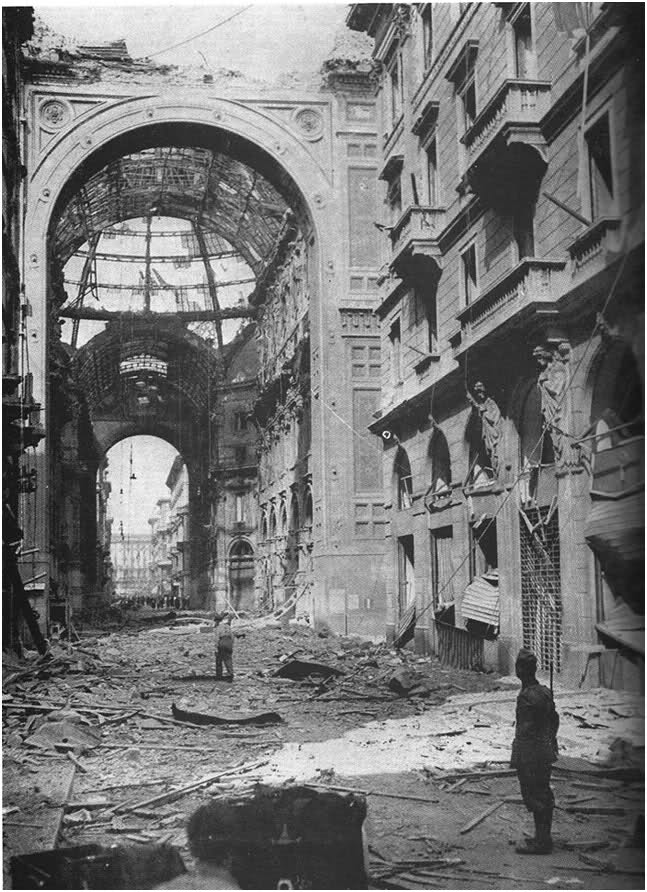
The Galleria Vittorio Emanuele II after the August 1943 bombing

After the Summer of 1943 and the armistice of Cassibile, the Bomber Command ended its area bombing campaign over Northern Italy. Milan was not bombed for several months thereafter, but in spring 1944, with the progress of the Italian Campaign, a new bombing campaign was started, this time by USAAF (by day) and RAF MAAF (by night). The bombings mainly targeted the city's marshalling yards and factories, but inaccuracy in bombing often caused severe damage to residential areas and civilian casualties.

The first bombing of 1944 took place in the night between 28 and 29 March, when 78 Vickers Wellington of the RAF MAAF bombers attacked the Milano Lambrate railway station. The target was hit, with the destruction of rails and about 300 wagons, but bombs also fell on the surrounding areas, killing 18 inhabitants and wounding 45. On the morning of 29 March, a further 139 bombers of the USAAF Fifteenth Air Force attacked the same target, destroying 500 more wagons, five locomotives and over 5 km of rails; 59 people were killed. No planes were shot down in either instance. On April 30 a new bombing by the Fifteenth Air Force destroyed the Breda factory and inflicted further damage on the Lambrate marshalling yard (32 locomotives and 100 wagons were destroyed); in addition to these targets, the city was also hit, resulting in 40 civilian casualties. On the night of 13 May eight MAAF bombers, sent to attack the Lambrate marshalling yard, missed their target and dropped their bombs over Gorgonzola and Cernusco sul Naviglio. On the night of 10/11 July 1944, 84 MAAF Wellingtons bombed the Lambrate railway station once again, but this time the damage was not heavy (and one of the planes was lost); three nights later, 89 Wellingtons attacked the same target, but two were hit by AA fire and the marshalling yard suffered limited damage. On 10 September, 71 MAAF bombers launched one more strike against the Lambrate station, which was hit along with the surrounding city (52 casualties).

=== Bombing of Gorla ===
The last heavy bombing suffered by Milan took place on 20 October 1944. On this day, a group of 111 USAAF bombers were sent to bomb the Breda, Isotta Fraschini and Alfa Romeo plants; while the groups assigned to attack the Isotta Fraschini and Alfa Romeo hit their targets, the 36 Consolidated B-24 Liberators of the 451st Bomb Group missed the Breda factory due to a navigation error, and their commander, upon realizing the mistake, decided to release the bombs immediately. This resulted in about 80 tons of bombs falling over the heavily populated suburbs of Gorla and Precotto; 614 civilians were killed, among them 184 children, 14 teachers, the school director, 4 janitors and a health assistant of the "Francesco Crispi" elementary school, which received a direct hit while the children and school personnel were going downstairs to the air raid shelter. The only two survivors were students, Noemi Cappellini and Antonio Skomina, both 7 years old at the time, who both refused the orders of the nuns to remain in the air raid shelter.

After 20 October 1944, no more bombings were carried out on Milan. Countless minor air attacks, mainly strafing and bombing actions by fighter-bombers and light bombers, took place throughout the autumn of 1944, the subsequent winter and the spring of 1945; trains, vehicles, modes of transport and more generally targets of opportunity were attacked. Dozens more civilians were killed, as it was not possible to distinguish trains and vehicles used by the Wehrmacht and those carrying civilians.

== Damage and casualties ==
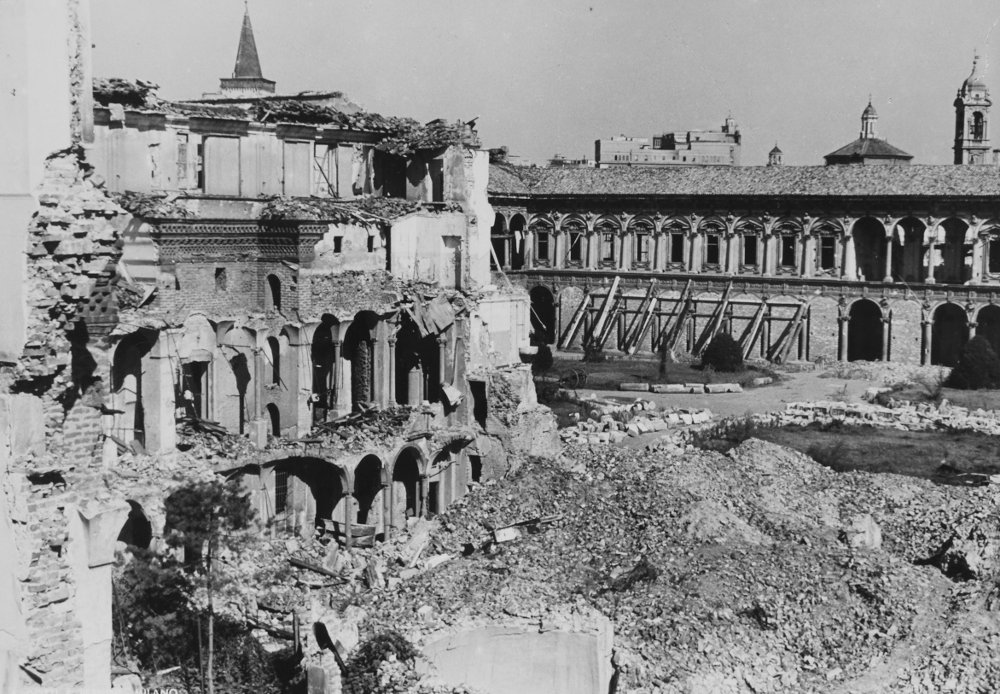
Damage to the Ospedale Maggiore

Although a reliable and complete count has never been made, it has been estimated that at least 2,200 people were killed in the bombings of Milan; the second heaviest death toll in Northern Italy (Bologna suffered 2,481 casualties). At least 400,000 people, more than one third of the population, were left homeless.

At the end of the war, Milan had suffered heavy damage from the air raids; out of 930,000 rooms that existed before the war, 360,000 were destroyed or heavily damaged, and over 200,000 suffered lighter damage. Overall, about one third of the buildings were destroyed or had to be subsequently demolished; the ruins were used to create the artificial hill known as Monte Stella. The heavy destruction of the areas surrounding the city centre and the unregulated building that ensued in the reconstruction years left this part of Milan heavily disfigured.

Due to the area bombing focusing on the city centre, the cultural heritage was hit the hardest; three quarters of the historical buildings suffered various extents of damage, including the cathedral, the Basilica of Sant'Ambrogio, Santa Maria delle Grazie, the Sforza Castle, the Royal Palace, La Scala and the Galleria Vittorio Emanuele II. The industry and transport system, having been prime targets for the whole duration of the war, also suffered heavy damage; the main factories (Caproni, Innocenti, Pirelli, Breda, Alfa Romeo, Isotta Fraschini) suffered heavy damage, as did most of the railway stations. Public transport inside the city was completely disrupted.
