= Bombing of Gorla =

1944 US bombing of an Italian city

- Part of Bombing of Milan in World War II
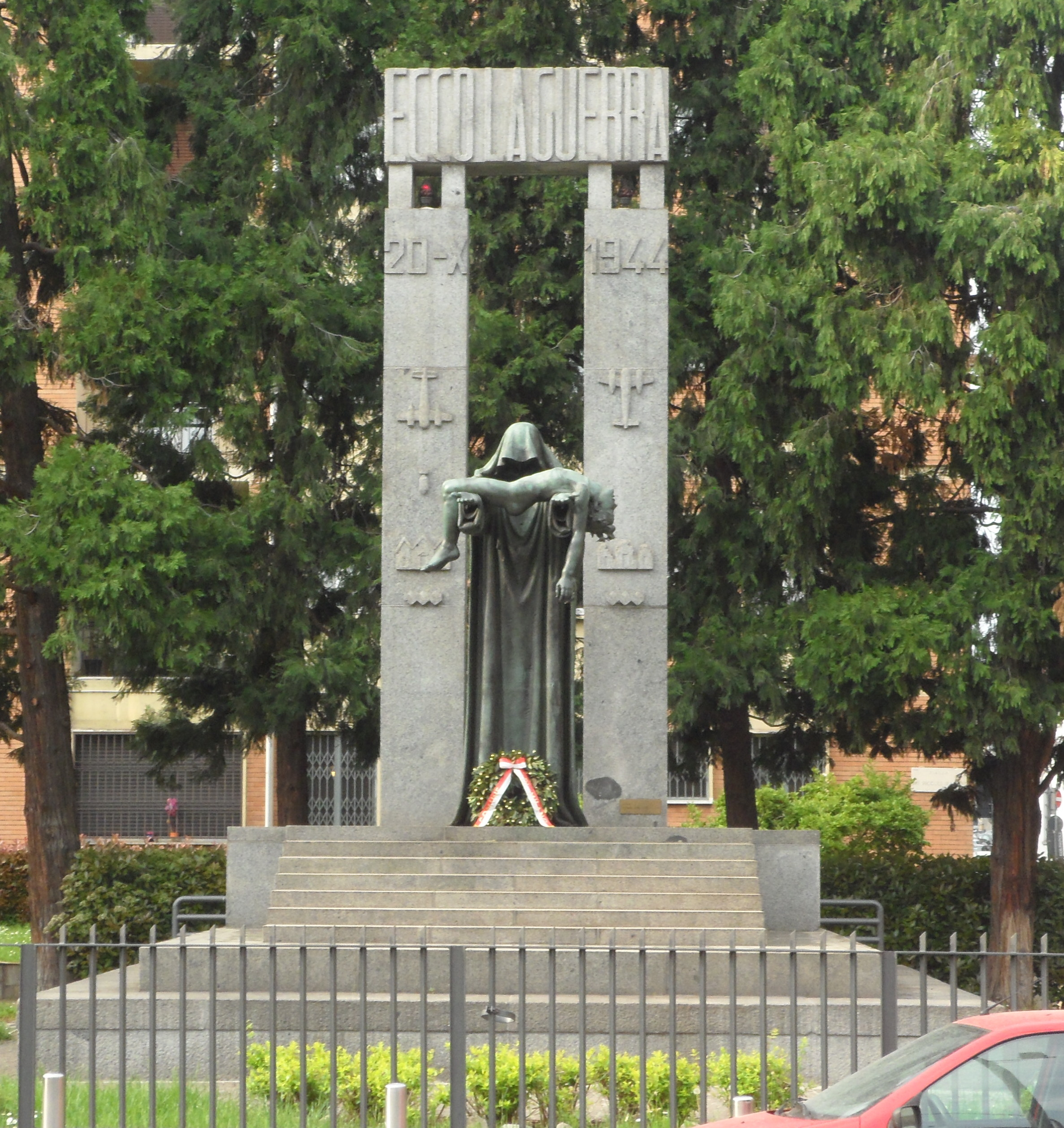
- Monument to the Piccoli Martiri of Gorla
- Location: Gorla district, Milan, Italy
- Date: 20 October 1944
- Target: Milan
- Attack type: Airstrike
- Deaths: 614 civilians, including 184 children, 14 teachers, 4 janitors, a heath assistant and a school dicrector
- Injuries: Unknown
- Perpetrator: 451st Bombardment Group of the United States Army Air Force
- Motive: Navigational error Indifference towards Italian civilian casualties

The bombing of Gorla, also known as the Gorla massacre (Italian: la strage di Gorla), was an aerial bombing attack on Gorla, a district of Milan, Italy, conducted by the United States Army Air Forces in October 1944. The bombing was precipitated when a navigational error placed an American bomber force over Gorla instead of its intended target. Taking place during a protracted campaign of strategic bombing of Milan, some 614 civilians were killed, most notably 184 children, who were at the Francesco Crispi primary school in the district.

== Background ==
Allied strategic bombing raids over Italy began in 1940, with a series of RAF bombing missions against targets in Italy. The strategic bombing escalated in late 1942, with the US Army Air Forces launching its own missions against Italian targets in 1943. The most affected cities included those in the industrial triangle, where the country's industrial production and military reserves were concentrated. As the main economic and industrial center in the Kingdom of Italy and the country's second largest city, Milan was subjected to heavy bombing; it was the most bombed city in Northern Italy and one of the most bombed cities in the country. After Italy signed the armistice of Cassibile with the Allies in September 1943, Nazi Germany occupied northern Italy and established a fascist puppet state, the Italian Social Republic. Milan remained under the control of the German army and the Social Republic, and so the city continued to be bombed by the Allied air forces as the Allies advanced north through Italy.

The clear Italian weather, coupled with ambiguous pre-war military bombing doctrine, resulted in a high number of civilian casualties during allied bombing operations in Italy. The relative inaccuracy of area bombing also increased the likelihood bombs would fall on civilian targets, and inexperienced aircrews led to an increase in navigational and operational mistakes. The unit that would later bomb Gorla, the 451st Bombing group of the Fifteenth Air Force, had previously been reprimanded for misconduct during a bombing mission; during the third Battle of Monte Cassino, aircraft from the unit had accidentally attacked the town of Venafro, killing 40 Italian civilians and 17 Allied soldiers. Despite the reprimand and subsequent investigation into the incident, the investigating officer recommend that no officers be court martialed, as such an action may have a "depressing reaction" on the ability of the unit to continue its mission.

== Attack ==
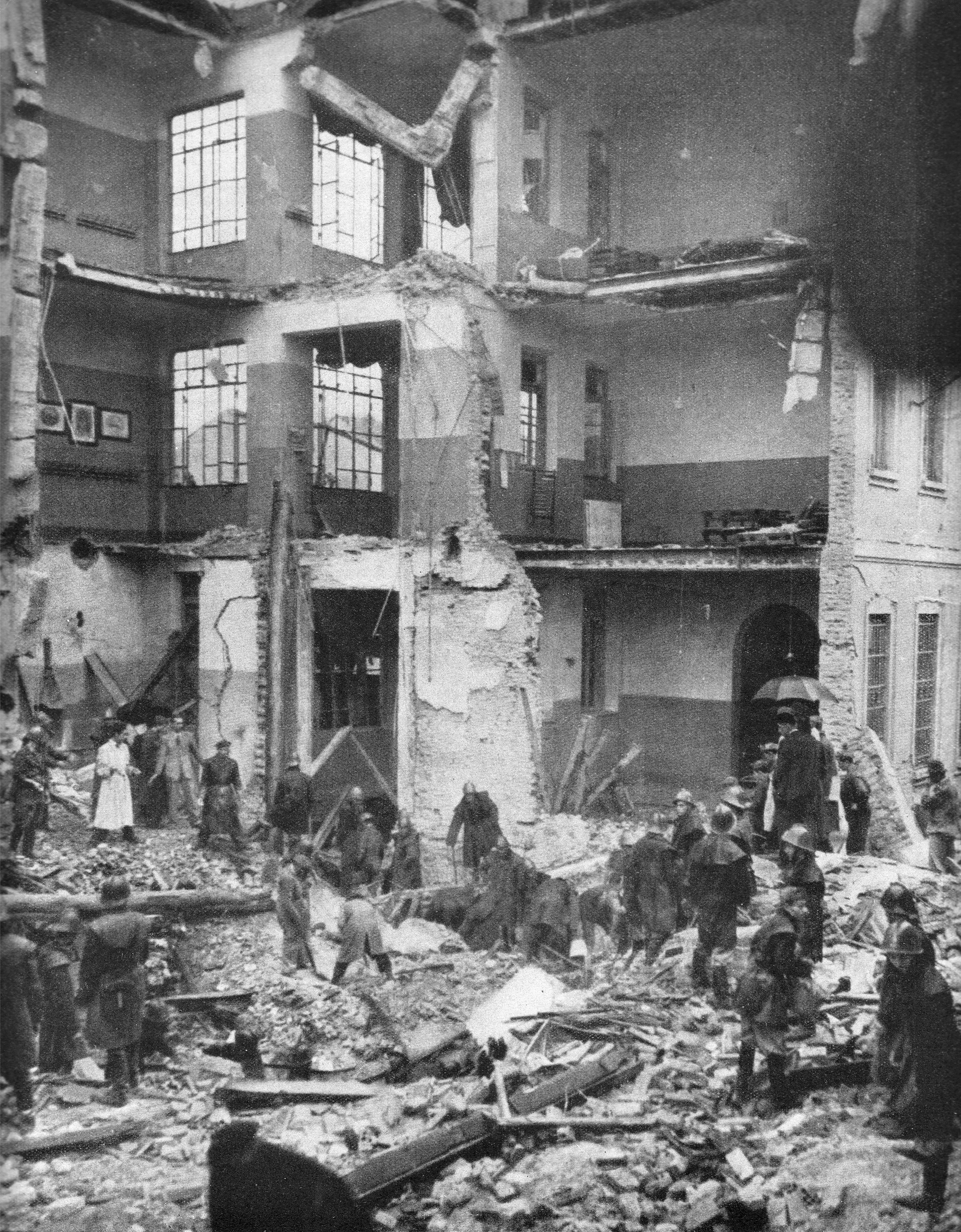
Rescue workers at the school after the attack

On 20 October 1944, a group of 111 USAAF bombers, which were part of the 49th Bombardment Wing, took off from Foggia to strike several industrial targets in Milan. The daylight raid intended to hit the Alfa Romeo, Isotta Fraschini, and Breda works in the city, all of which were being used in the war effort. Two units, the 461st and 484th Bomb groups, successfully hit their respective targets, the Alfa and Fraschini works. The 451st Bombing group was tasked with attacking the Breda works. The 451st Bomber group approached its target in two waves. Each wave's aircraft were divided into three combat boxes, with aircraft flying at high and low altitudes. To execute the attack, the 451st identified an "initial point" 4 km to the west of the Breda works; when each attack wave reached this point, they would execute a pre-planned maneuver and begin their attack on the target.

The first attack wave met with mixed success; the lead aircraft and the wave's high flying aircraft pre-maturely dropped their bombs at the "initial point", undershooting the Breda plant. The lower flying aircraft of the first wave successfully reached and hit the Breda works. As the second wave of aircraft approached the initial point, the lead aircraft made a critical navigational error - instead of turning 22 degrees left at the "initial point" and then continuing on to the target, the lead aircraft turned 22 degrees right, sending the bombers off course and causing them to drift over the heavily populated districts of Gorla and Precotto. Realizing that it was not possible to correct course and hit the Breda works, the lead bomber dropped its bombs and ordered the unit to return to base. All three combat boxes followed suit, and as such all of the second wave's bomb load fell in the Gorla area. It was common practice for American bombers to discard un-dropped bombs in empty fields or into the Adriatic Sea while returning to base (landing an aircraft laden with armed bombs was a major hazard), but it was not uncommon for bomber units to engage targets of opportunity in enemy controlled cities, even if they were near civilian population centers.

Air raid sirens had sounded in Milan at 11:14 in the morning, warning the district's residents of an impending air raid; however, many people had not made it to shelter when the bombs hit around 15 minutes later. Civilian eyewitness accounts of the event vary, with some remembering low-flying bombers while others remember bombers high in the air. (Note: The discrepancy in eye witness accounts (per Corrado and sources cited in IBCC material) is likely explained by the fact that the secnd attack wave contained aircraft flying in both a "high" and "low" box formation.) 614 civilians were killed in Gorla and Precotto. Among those killed were 184 students of the Gorla elementary school, 14 teachers, the school director, 4 janitors, and a health assistant. A bomb hit the central stairwell of the school building as the children and school personnel were going down to the air raid shelter. After the raid, the 451st faced internal criticism from within the 49th Bombardment Wing, but faced no further repercussions for bombing Gorla. There are allegations that American strategic bombing doctrine, which placed an emphasis on breaking the morale of an enemy nation through the bombing of cities, led to a culture of indifference towards Italian civilian casualties.

== Legacy ==
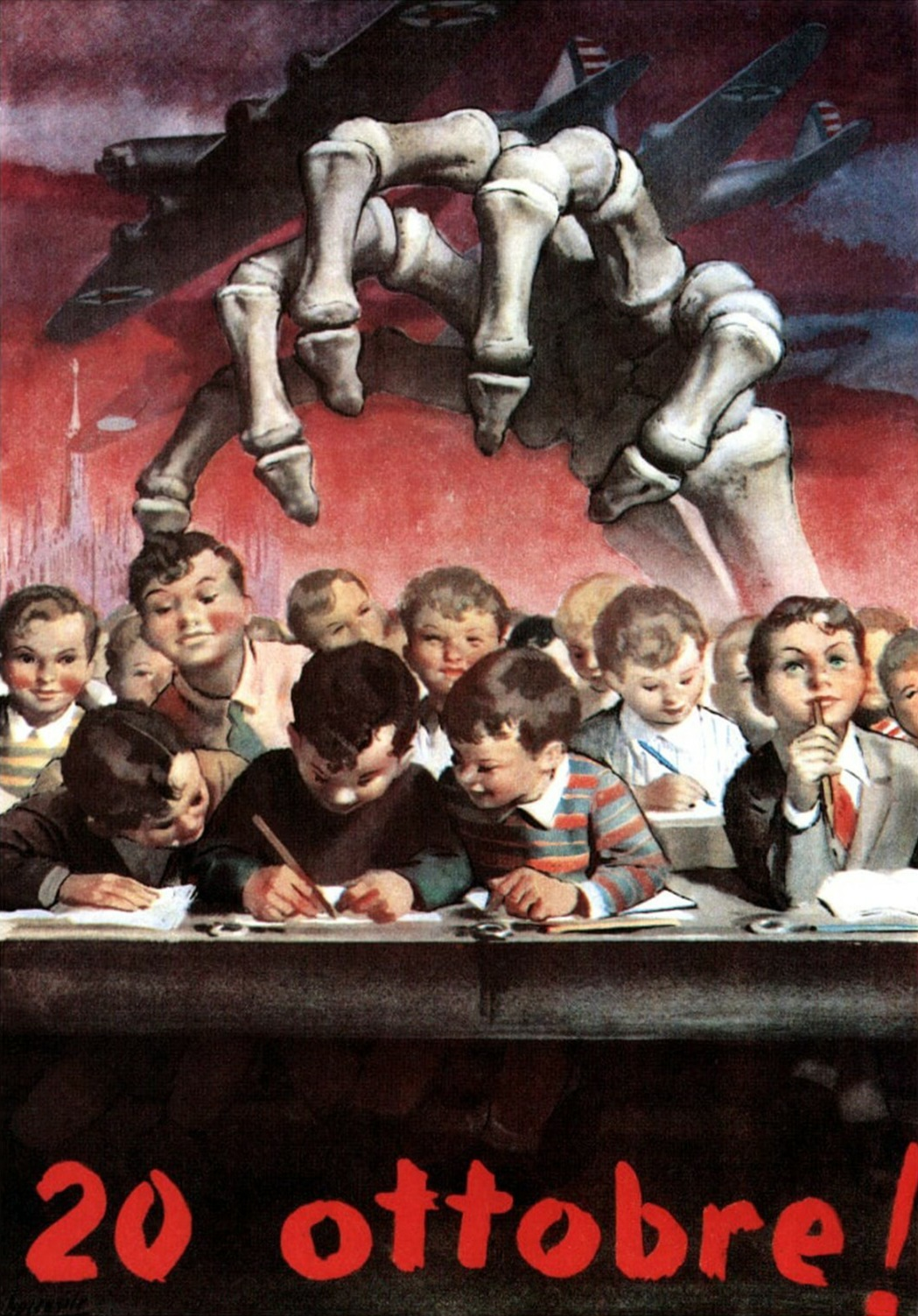
Fascist propaganda poster by Gino Boccasile denouncing the bombing of Gorla

The city of Milan reeled from the 20 October raid. In addition to disruptions to the city's railyards and motor works, the destruction of the Gorla quartiere and high civilian death toll led to public mourning. The child victims of the bombing raid are remembered as "the Little Martyrs of Gorla". Facing a deteriorating military situation, the fascist Italian Social Republic produced propaganda focused on the destruction caused during the bombing. Italian fascist propaganda depicting the Allies as "murderers" or "assassins" of children had begun earlier in the war, (Note: Italian propaganda tying Allied bombing raids to the deaths of children began after an airstrike on the Tuscan city of Grosseto in April 1943. After the raid, stories were placed in Italian newspapers claiming Allied planes had targeted children by dropping booby-trapped toys and poisoned sweets. While false, these rumors led to panic in the Italian population; fascist propaganda later capitalized on these rumors to accuse the Allies of deliberately targeting children.) and this trend was accelerated after the destruction of Gorla. This propaganda effort came too late in the war to have a meaningful effect on Italian civilian morale. One civilian witness to the bombing noted that some mothers of children victims of the bombing cheered American troops when they entered Milan, and that memories of the bombing was mostly confined to families who had lost a loved one. In addition to being used in wartime propaganda, the bombing was also used in propaganda by the post-war Italian right.

The Monument to the Piccoli Martiri of Gorla was built as a memorial on the site of the school in 1952, and the Italian Peace Museum of Milan was established in the area. The Association of the Italian Peace Museum of Milan, which was founded in part by survivors of the bombing, has organized peace walks and educational events. Italian painters Antonio Maria Mucchi and Gabriele Mucchi used the bombing as subject matter in several of their paintings. In 2019, Milan's mayor Giuseppe Sala appealed to U.S. authorities to apologize for the bombing, which the U.S. military has not done as of 2023.

== See also ==
- Allied war crimes during World War II
- Axis war crimes in Italy
- Bombing of Milan in World War II
- Italian campaign (World War II)
- List of massacres in Italy
- Strategic bombing during World War II
- War crimes in World War II
- List of school massacres by death toll

== Bibliography ==
- Rastelli, Achille (2000). Bombe sulla città (in Italian). Milan: Mursia. ISBN 88-425-3220-7.
