= Monument to the Piccoli Martiri of Gorla =

Coordinates: 45.50444°N 9.22420°E

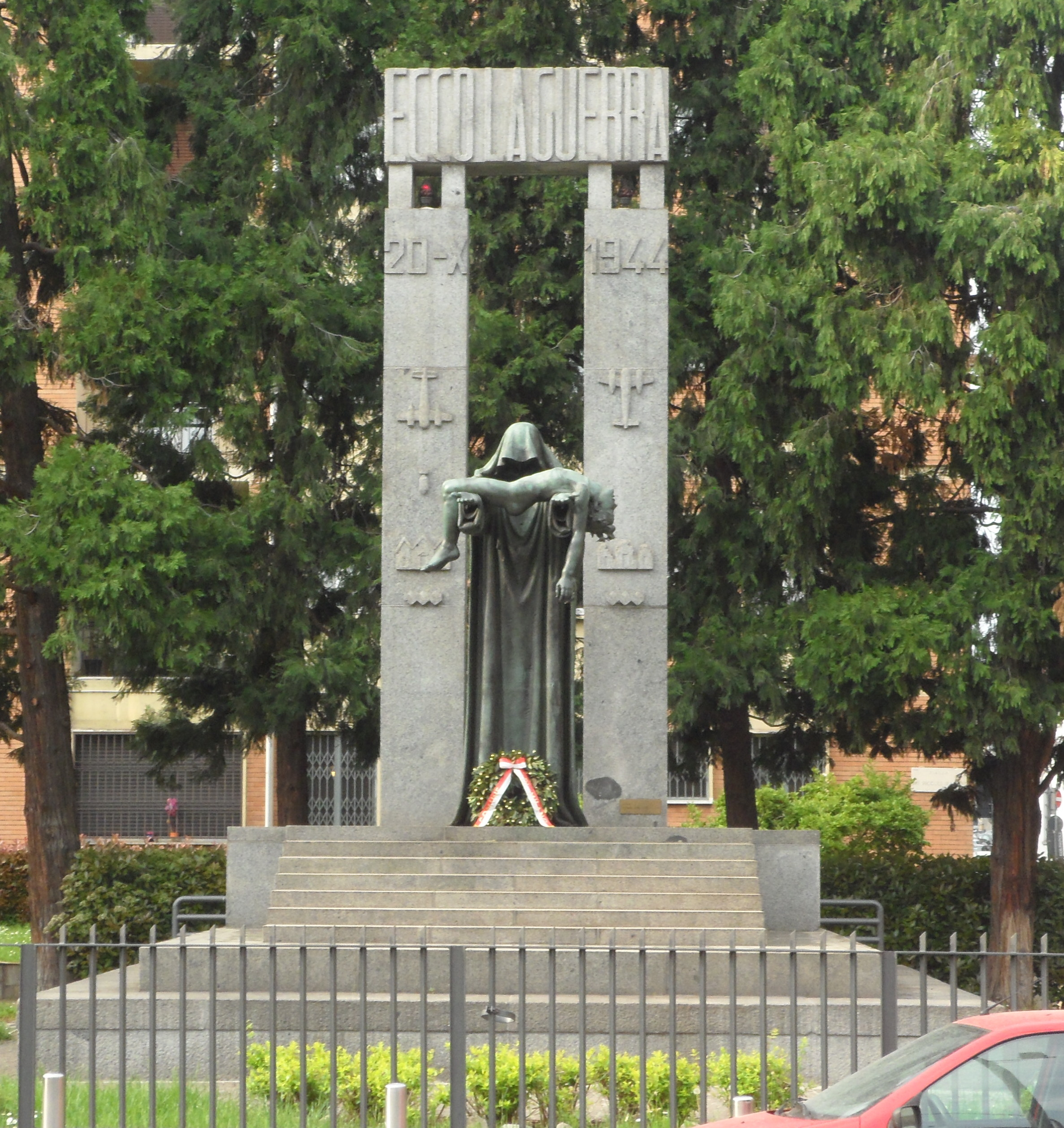
- Interactive map of Monument to the Piccoli Martiri of Gorla
- Location: Gorla, Milan, Italy
- Designer: Remo Brioschi
- Type: Ossuary
- Material: Granite portal, bronze sculptures
- Height: 8 metres (26 ft)
- Dedicated date: 1952
- Dedicated to: Bombing of Gorla victims

The Monument to the Piccoli Martiri di Gorla (Monument to the Little Martyrs of Gorla) is a monument and ossuary tomb located in piazza Piccoli Martiri, at the corner of Via Ponte Vecchio and Via Fratelli Pozzi, in the Gorla neighborhood of Zone 2 of Milan, Italy. Commissioned by a citizen subscription, designed by Remo Brioschi, it commemorates and houses the remains of the 184 children and 20 teachers and school staff who died at this site, while attending the elementary school Francesco Crispi due to an aerial bombardment of Gorla on 20 October, 1944.

== Description ==
The monument includes an ossuary at the base. The ossuary had been inaugurated by 1947; the monument by 1952.

The monument consists of a tall stone portal with a sans-serif inscription ECCO LA GUERRA (BEHOLD WAR). Flanking the portal are images of a plane dropping a bomb on a building. It has the date 20-X-1944 (20 October 1944). In front of the portal is a statue of a hooded figure, face partially obscured, holding the lifeless body of a naked boy. On the base, the inscription reads The people/ Cries for 200 children/ Killed by the war/ here in their school/ with their teachers/20 October 1944.

The event was initially touted by the fascist authorities as evidence of the barbarity of the allies. Over time, the monument has become a depiction of the horrors of war.
