= Gino Boccasile =

Italian illustrator (1901–1952)

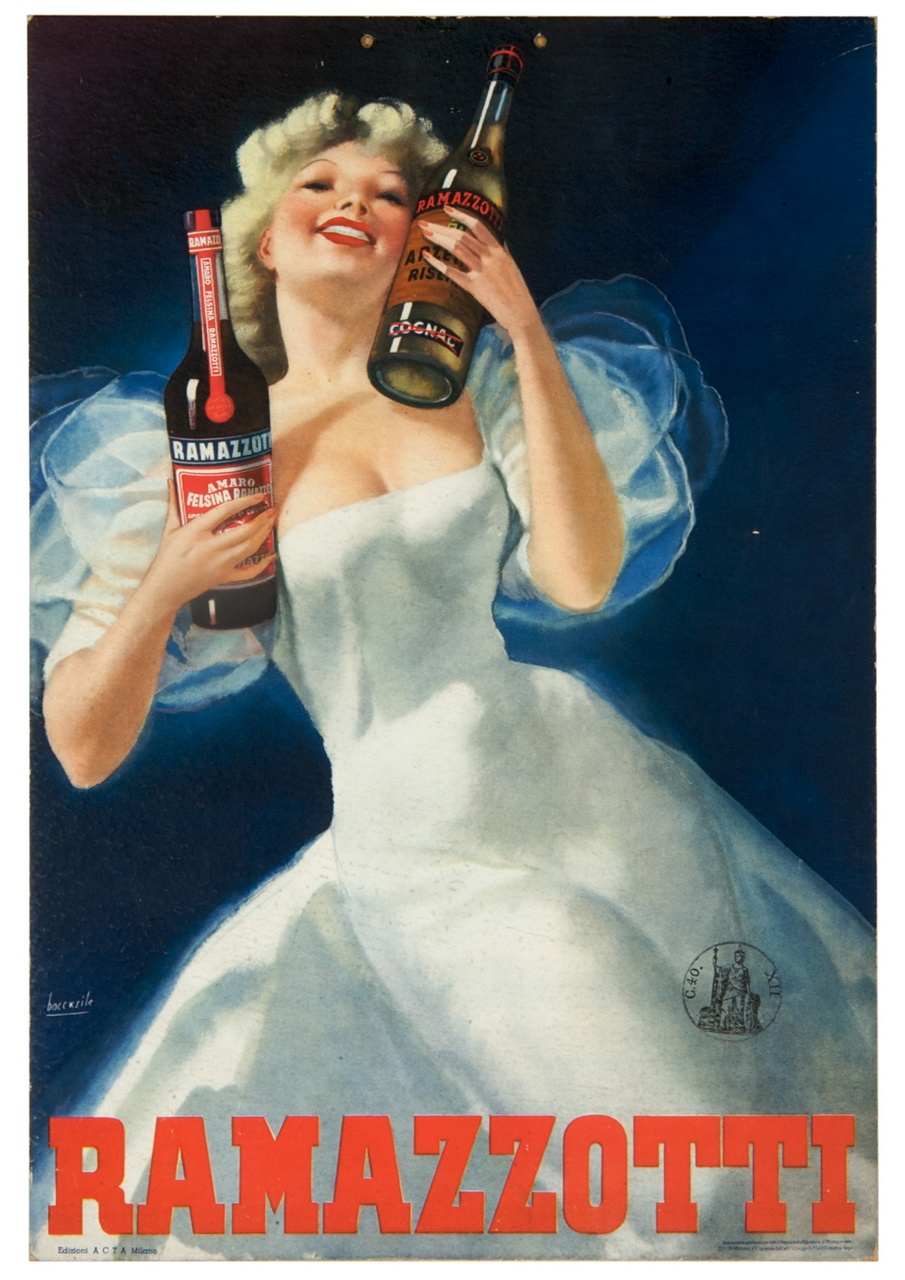
- Advertising poster by Gino Boccasile for Ramazzotti (1937)
- Born: 14 July 1901; Bari, Kingdom of Italy
- Died: 10 May 1952 (aged 50); Milan, Italy
- Known for: Painting, Illustration, Poster art
- Movement: Realism

Signature
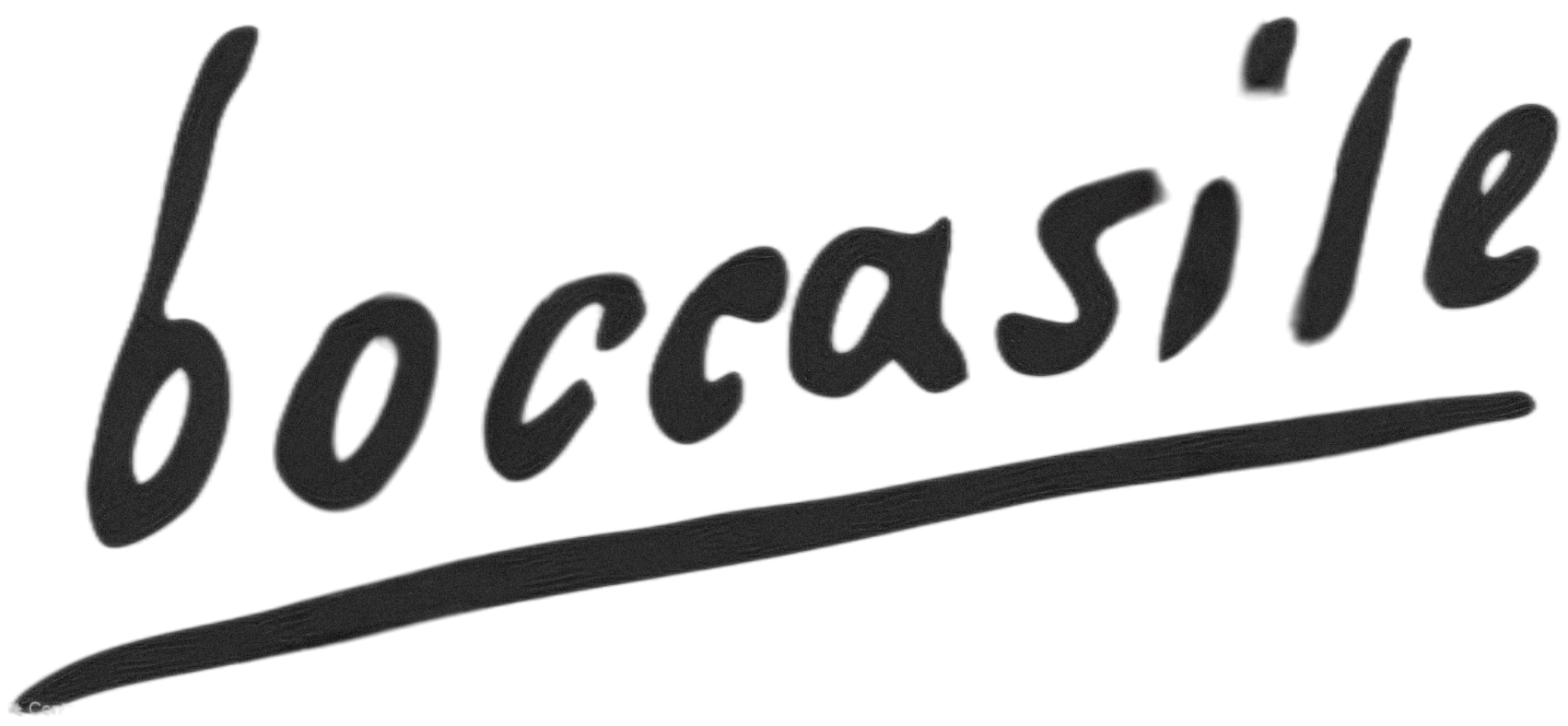

Gino Boccasile (14 July 1901 – 10 May 1952) was an Italian illustrator and graphic designer. He was one of the most important poster artists of the Fascist era.

== Biography ==
Born in Bari, Boccasile was the son of a perfumer. Early in his youth, he lost his left eye when it was struck by a splash of quicklime while he was drinking from a fountain. Nonetheless, he showed a precocious aptitude for design and completed studies at the fine art school of his hometown.

After the death of his father in 1925, he moved to Milan. Despite some initial difficulties, he eventually gained a post at the Mauzan-Morzenti Agency. Over the next few years, he produced posters, illustrated fashion magazines and gained fame for his sensuous renderings of the female form.

Following the lead of fellow poster artist Achille Mauzan, Boccasile went to Buenos Aires, where he met his future spouse Alma Corsi. In 1932, he moved to Paris, where an issue of Paris Tabou was dedicated to his work. He also participated in the Salon des Indépendants that same year. Shortly after returning to Milan, he opened a publicity agency called ACTA, in Galleria del Corso, with his friend Franco Aloi. He illustrated for the Italian periodicals La Donna (1932), Dea and La Lettura (1934), Bertoldo (1936), Il Milione (1938), L'Illustrazione del Medico (1939), Ecco, Settebello and Il Dramma (1939) and designed many book covers for publishers Mondadori and Rizzoli.

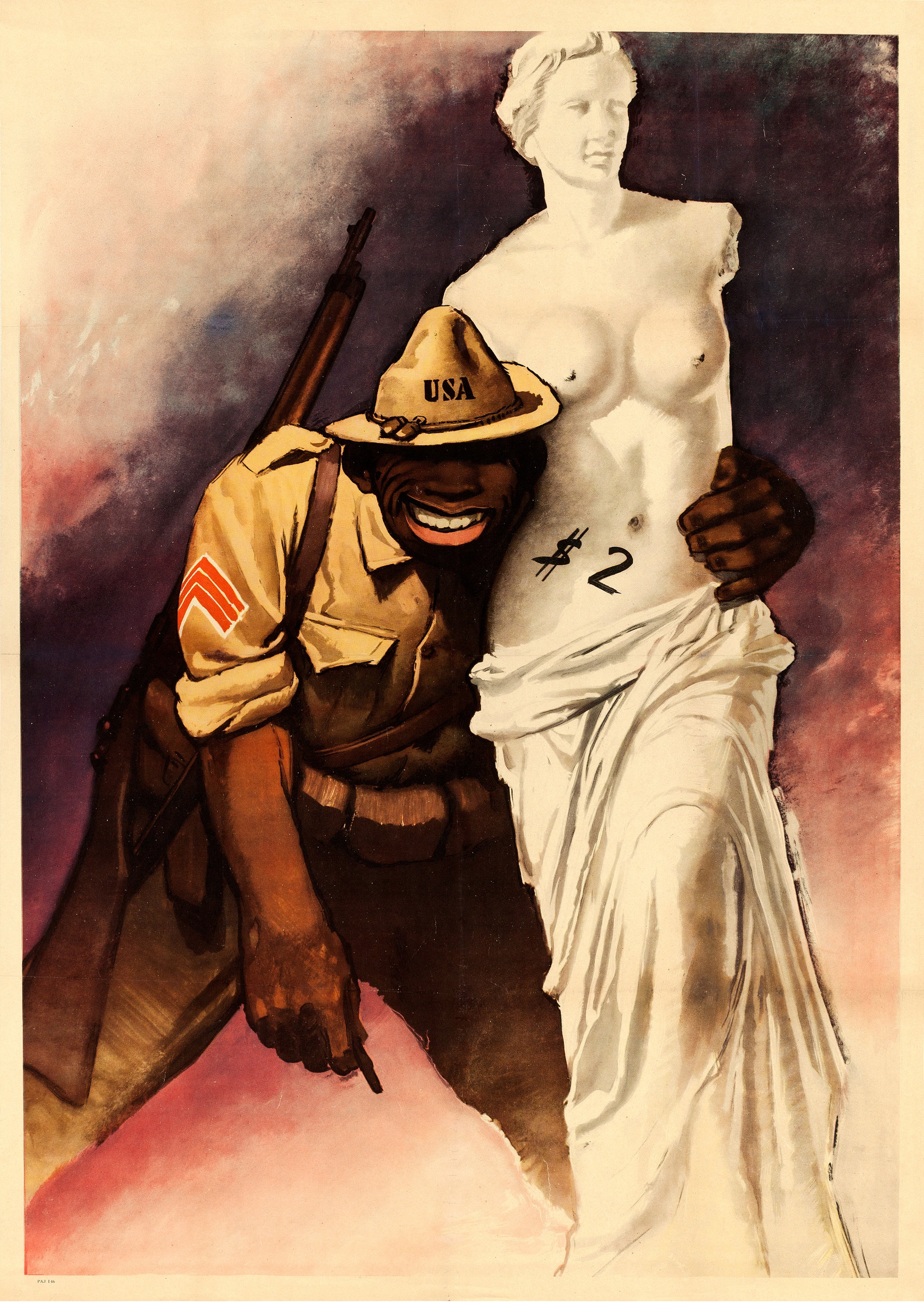
A typical racist anti-American propaganda poster by Boccasile for the Italian fascists during World War II

A supporter of Benito Mussolini, Boccasile produced propaganda material for his government. As the tide of war turned against Fascism, he became more involved in it, becoming a supporter of the German puppet state, RSI, established by Mussolini in Northern and Central Italy after his liberation from the Gran Sasso exile. Boccasile enlisted in the Italian SS Division, drawing their recruitment posters and illustrating propaganda material.

Several of Boccasile's propaganda posters relied on racial stereotypes, such as depicting African Americans as the epitome of cultural barbarism. One of the most famous posters depicts a black American soldier making off with the Venus de Milo, a symbol of European cultural ideals, which he has reduced to a value of two dollars. Another poster depicts a grotesque caricature of a Jewish man with a red star on his chest, clenching his fists in defence of New York City and the Statue of Liberty.

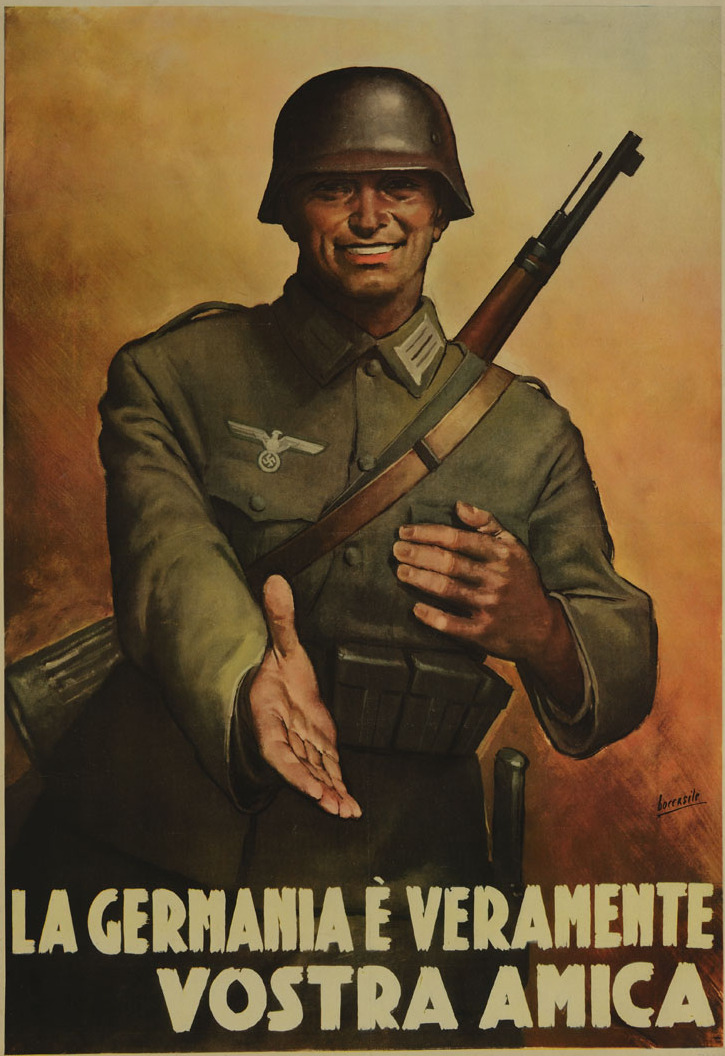
Italian Social Republic propaganda poster saying: "Germany is truly your friend", by Boccasile (1944)

After the war, Boccasile was imprisoned and tried for collaborating with the fascists. Though acquitted, he remained an outcast. He could not find work for several years, as his notoriety was feared by prospective employers. For a time, he designed postcards for the Italian Social Movement and veterans' associations. He supported himself briefly by doing pornographic sketches for English and French publishers.

By 1946, after changing his style, Boccasile was back at work. In 1947, he set up his own agency in Milan, where he created memorable posters for Paglieri cosmetics, Chlorodont toothpaste, Iperchina liquors and Zenith footwear. Although his work was primarily in advertising, he also drew for magazines like Il Travaso delle idee, Incanto, Paradiso and Sette.

Boccasile died suddenly from pleurisy on 10 May 1952, while working on his illustrations for Boccaccio's The Decameron (tempera on cardboard). He left behind 101 unfinished colour plates. The Decameron was his last work. It was completed using Boccasile's plates by Rino Albertarelli, Guido Bertoletti, Giorgio De Gaspari and Walter Molino, and was published by Edizioni d'Arte in 1955.

== Selected lithographs ==
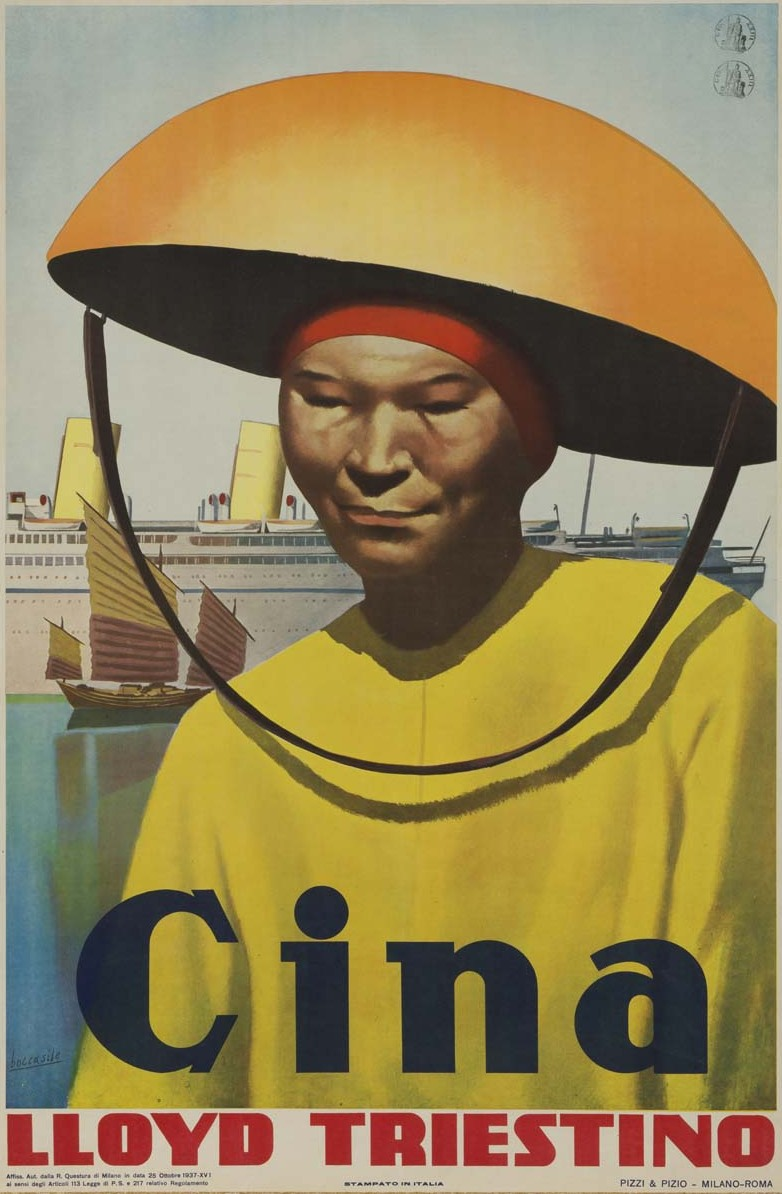
Advertising poster for Lloyd Triestino, 1930s

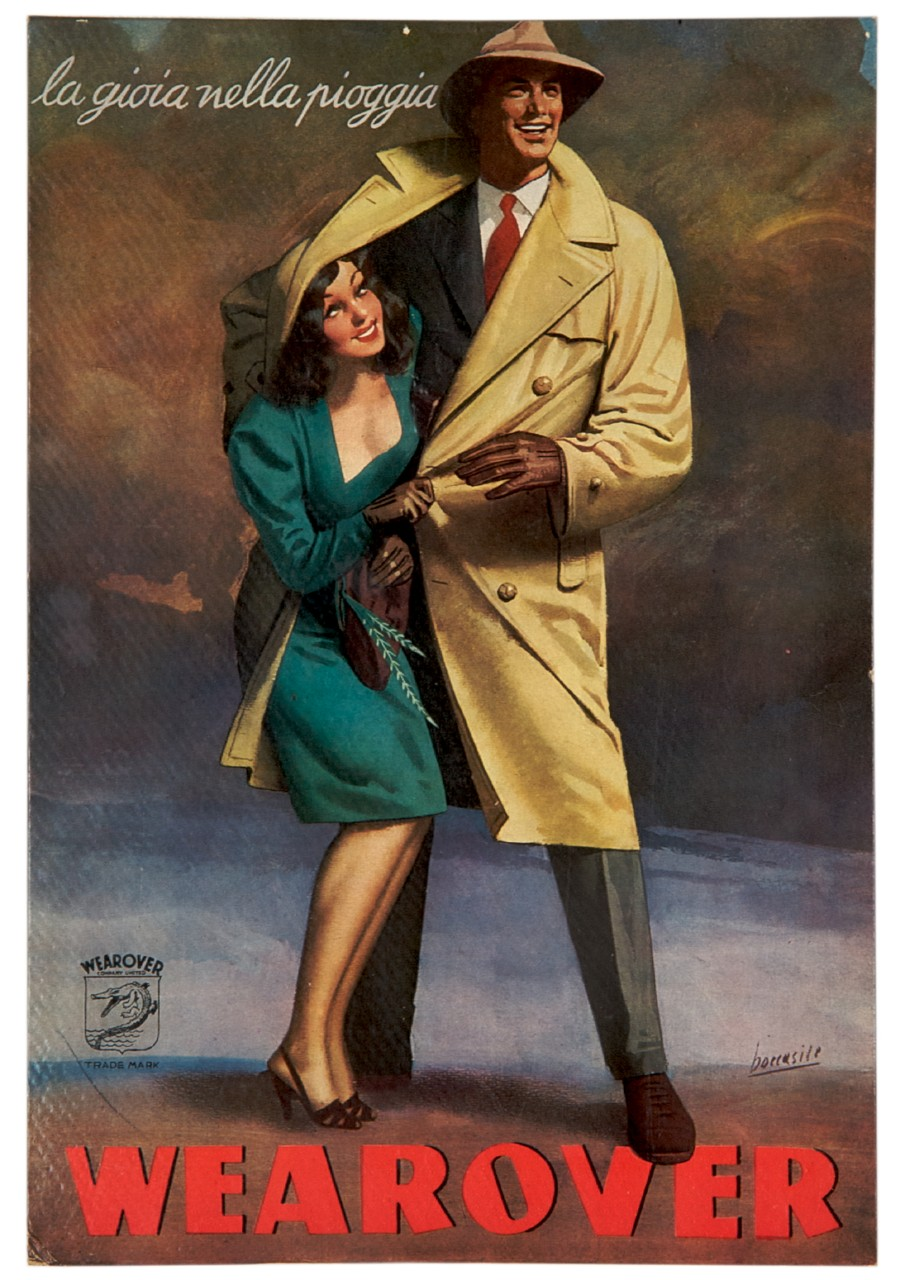
Advertising poster for Wearover, 1930s

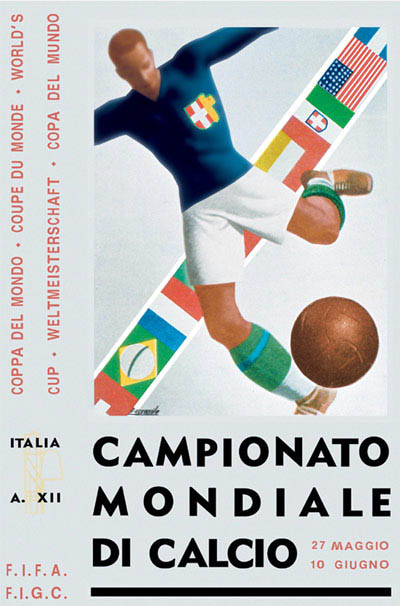
1934 FIFA World Cup poster

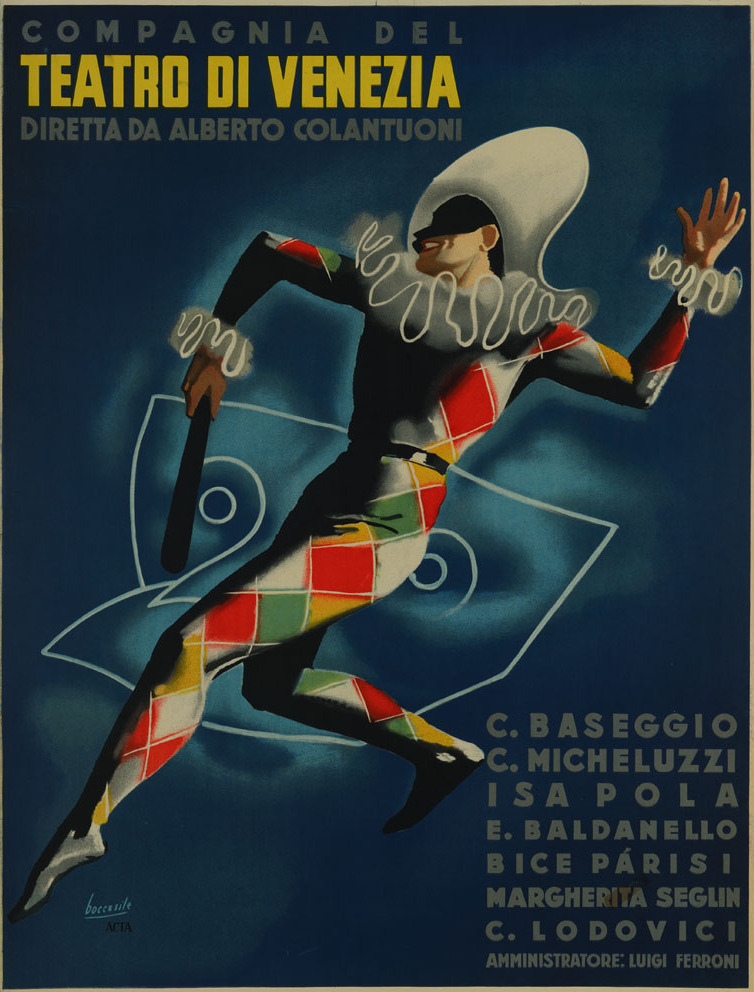
Poster advertising the Compagnia del Teatro Veneziano, 1937

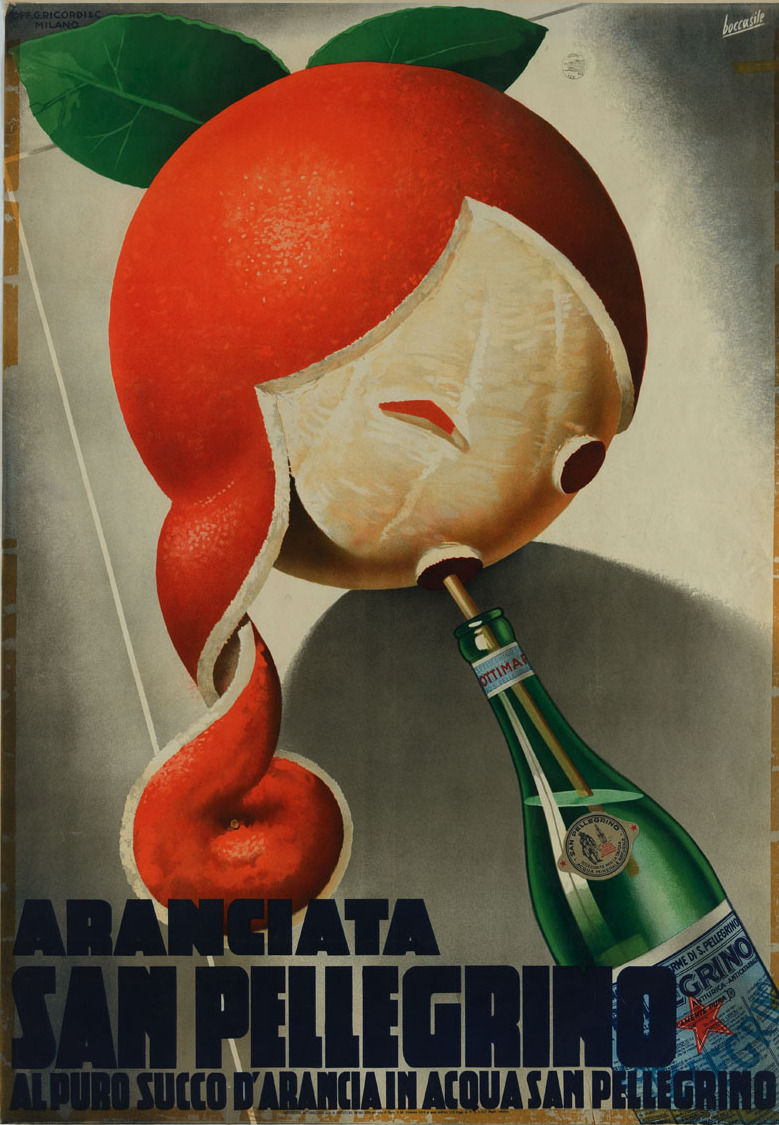
Poster advertising the Aranciata San Pellegrino, 1937

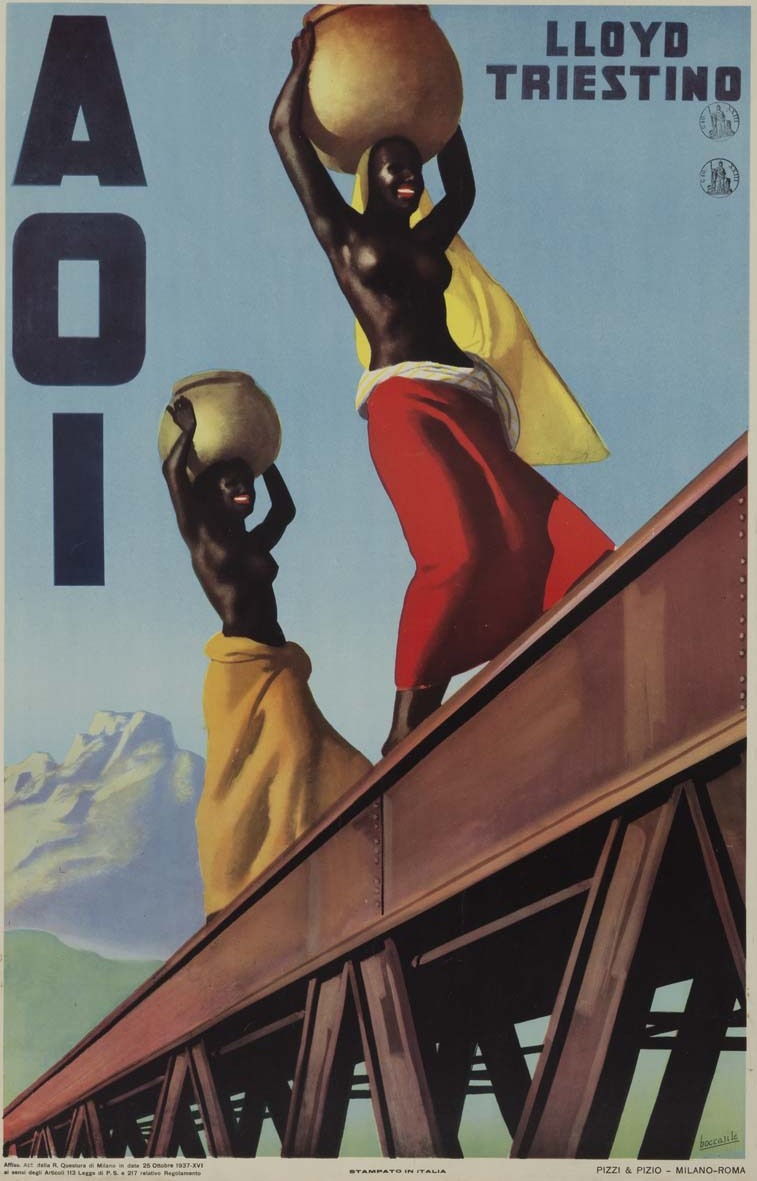
Advertising poster for Lloyd Triestino, 1937

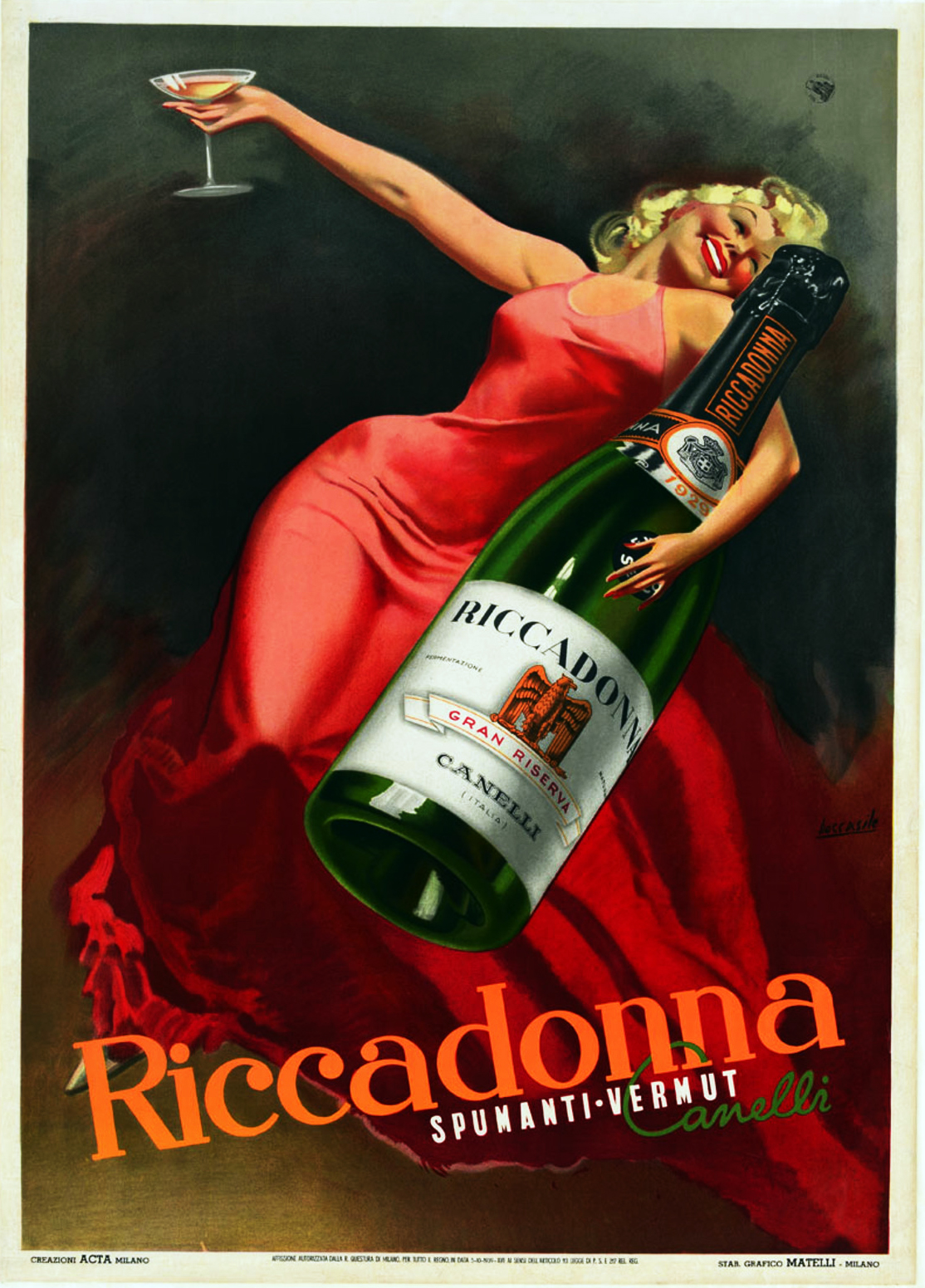
Advertising poster for Riccadonna Spumanti-Vermut, 1939

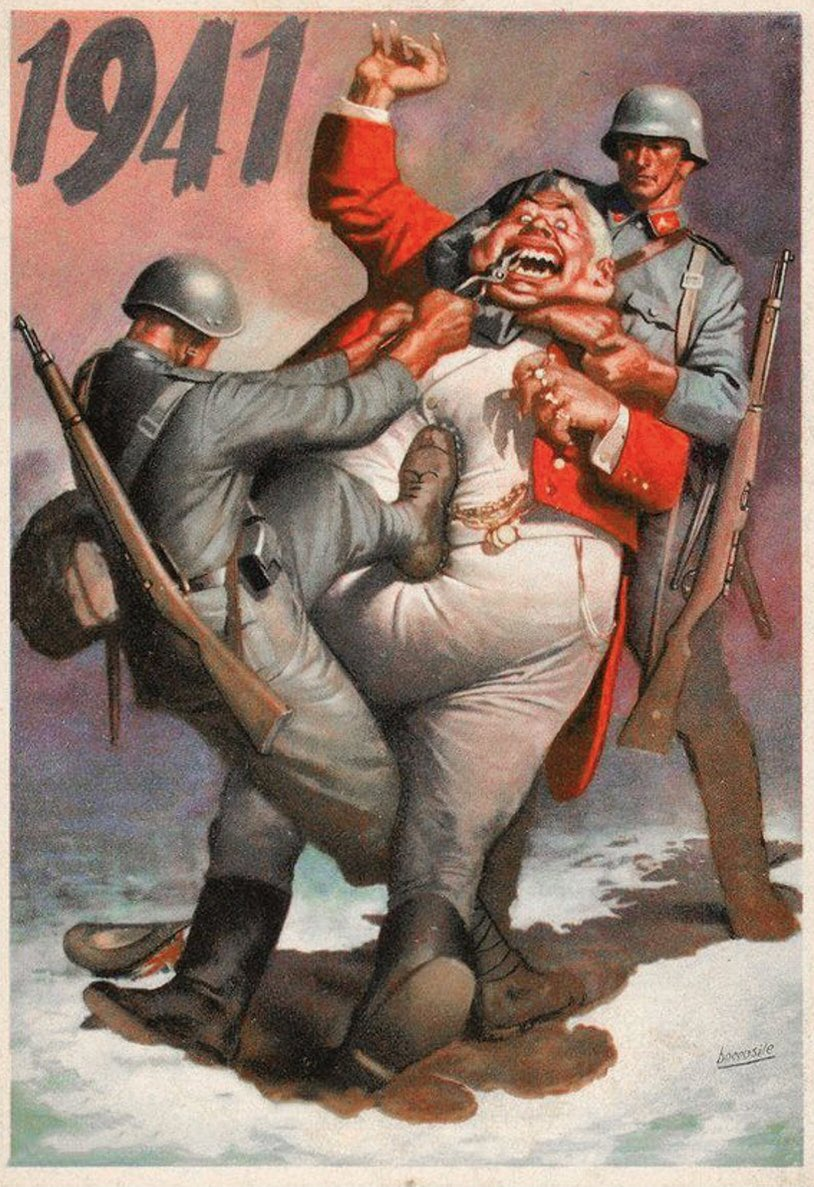
Anti-British propaganda postcard, 1941

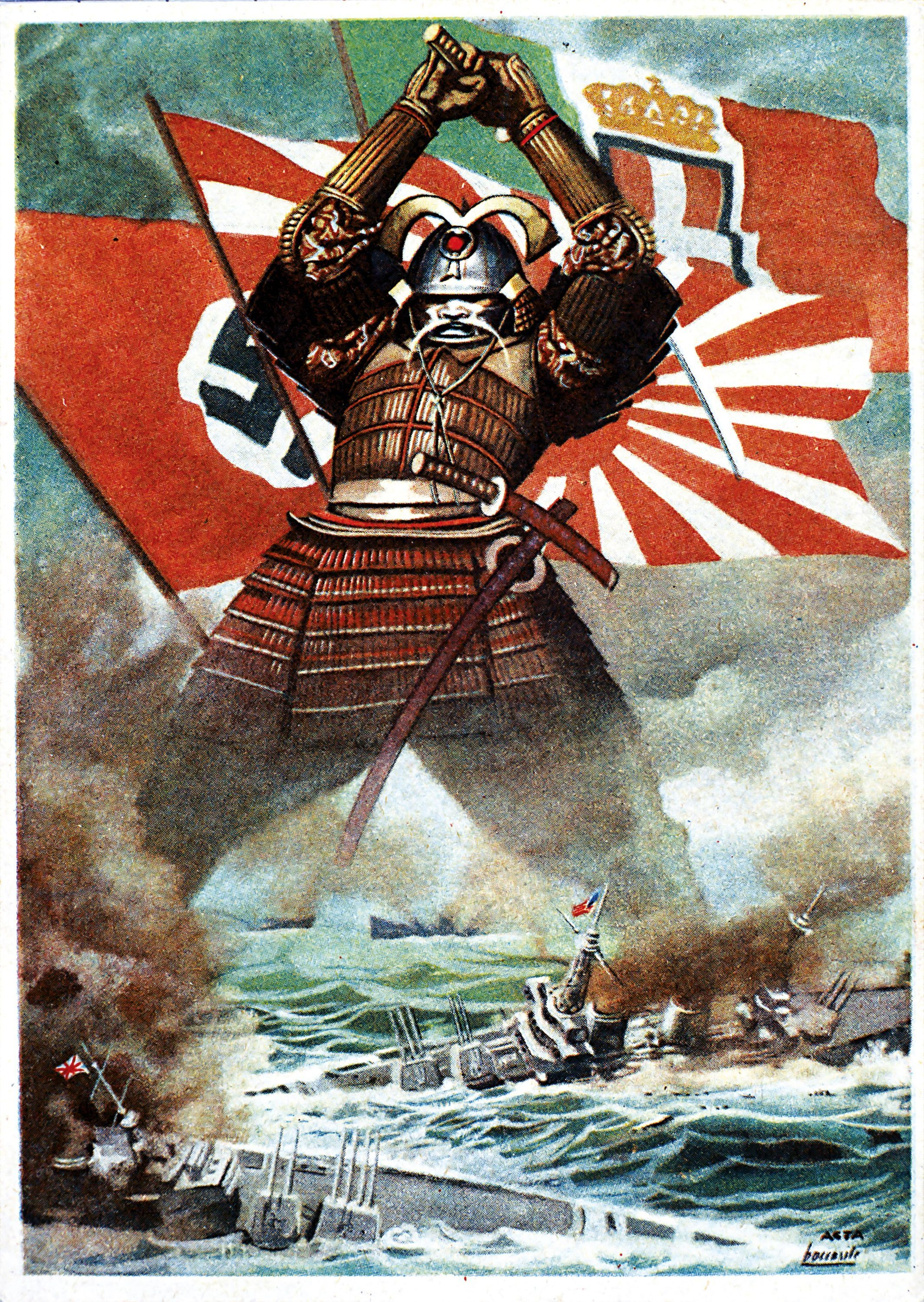
Pro-Japanese propaganda poster, 1942

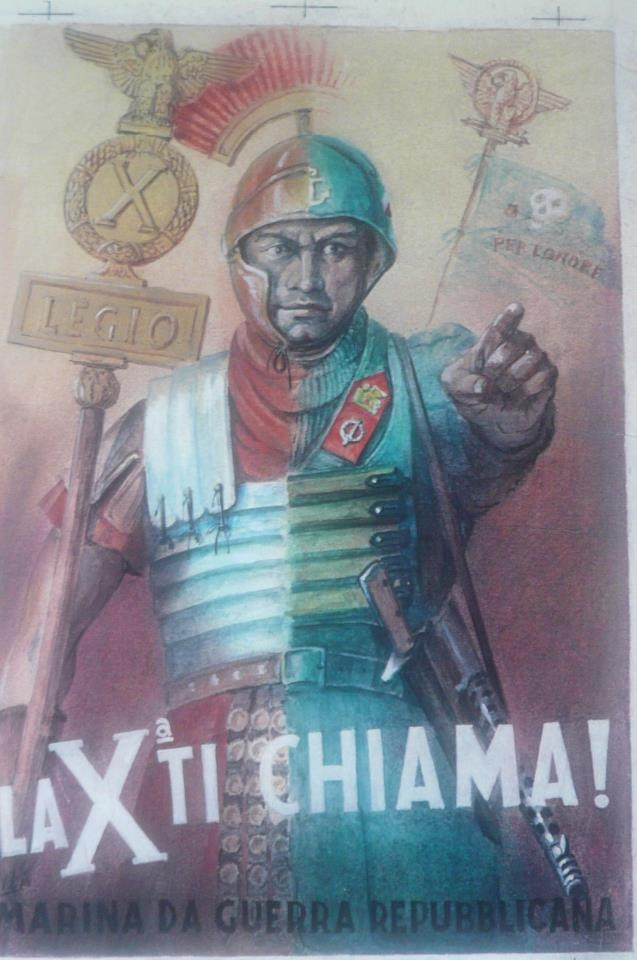
Decima Flottiglia MAS recruitment poster, 1943

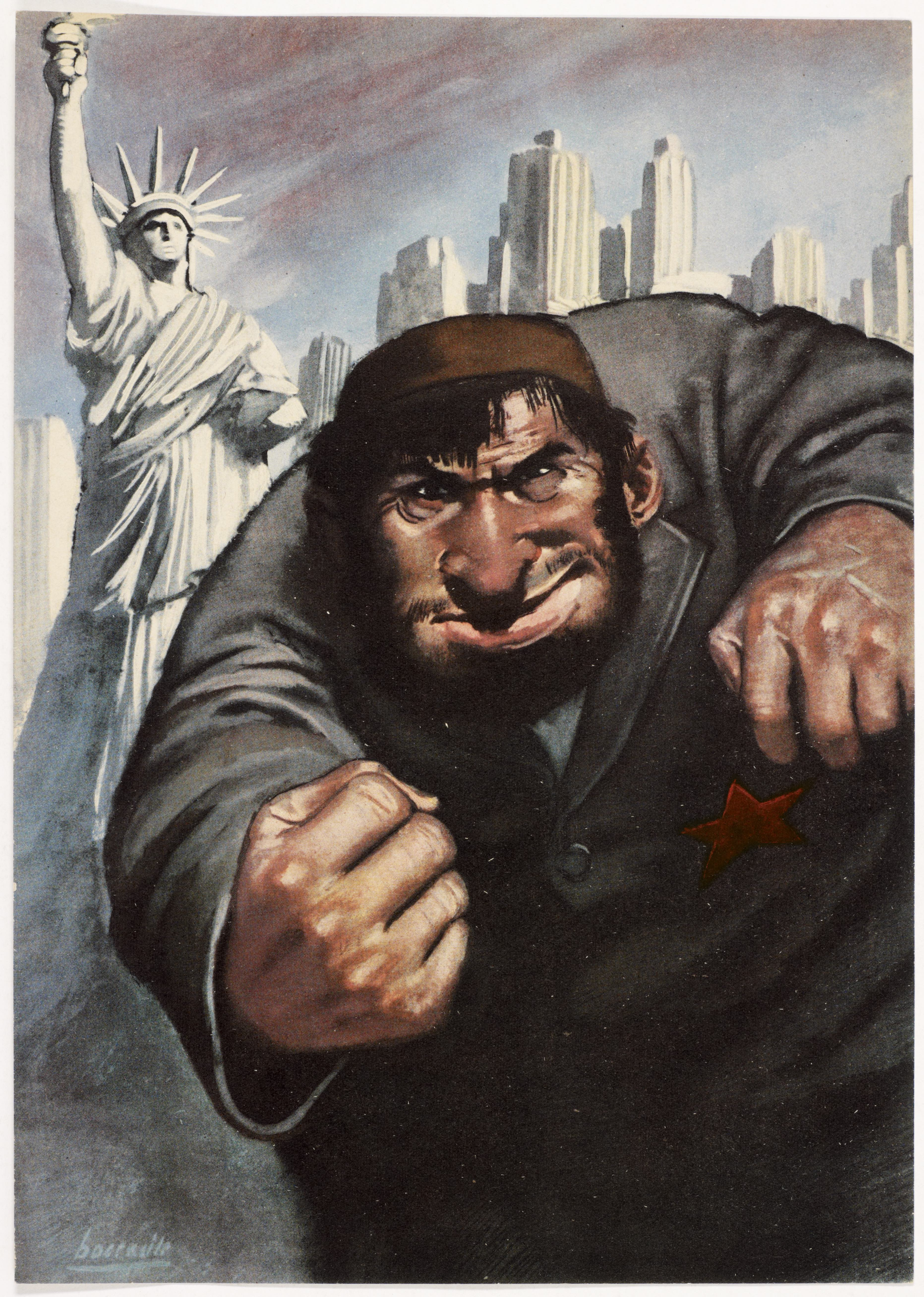
Antisemitic propaganda poster, 1943

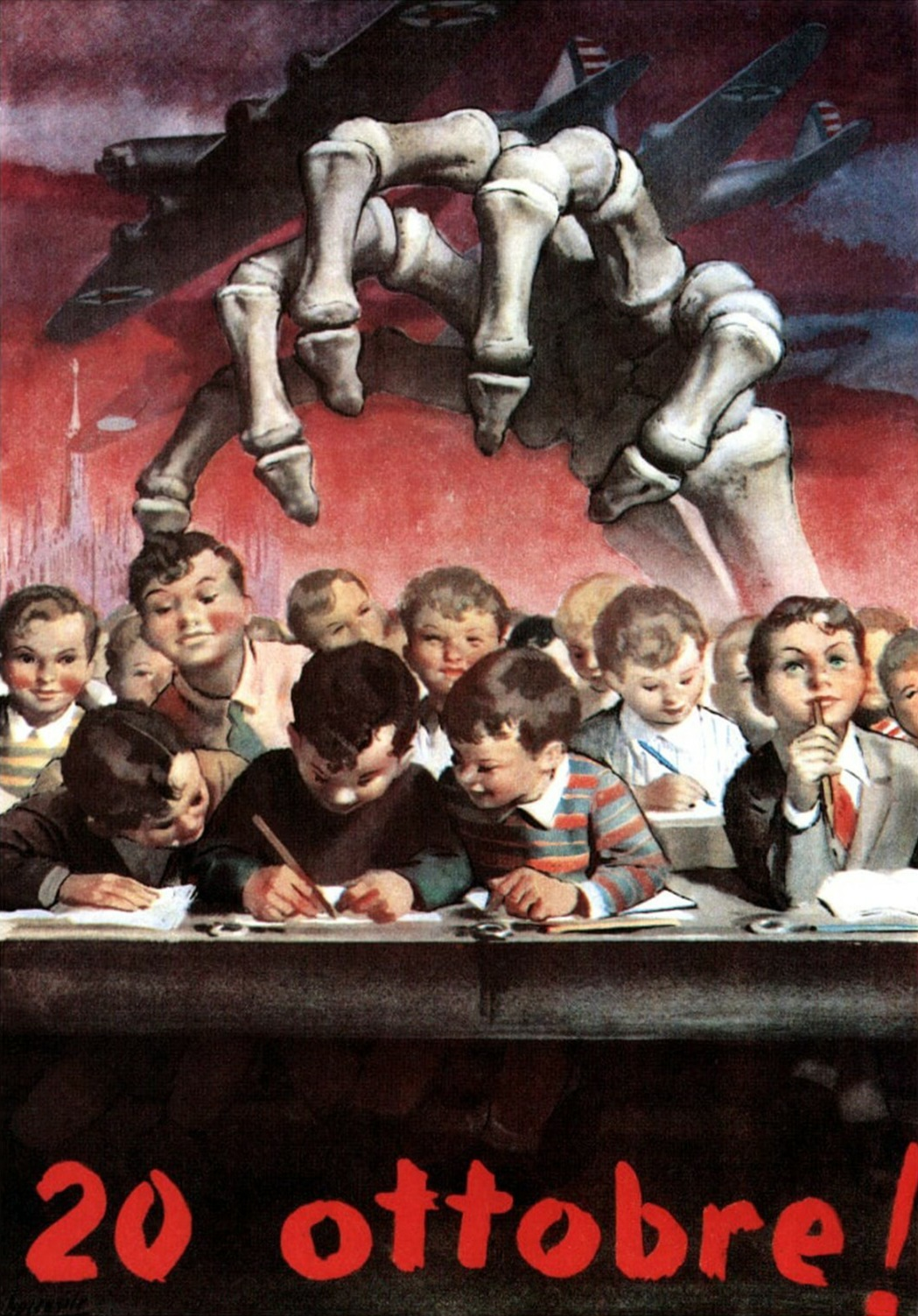
Propaganda poster denouncing the bombing of Gorla, 1944

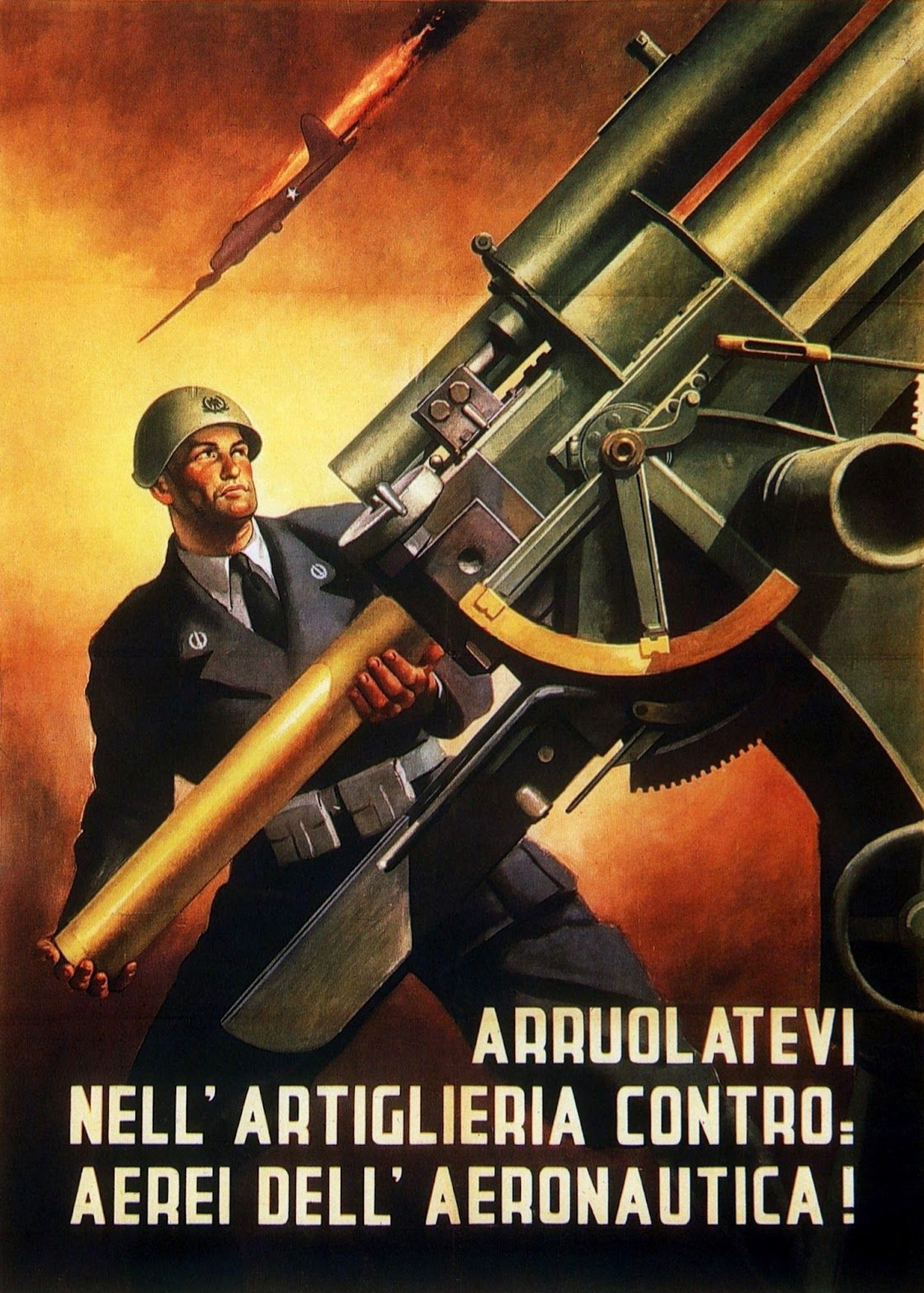
Anti-aircraft defense recruitment poster, 1944

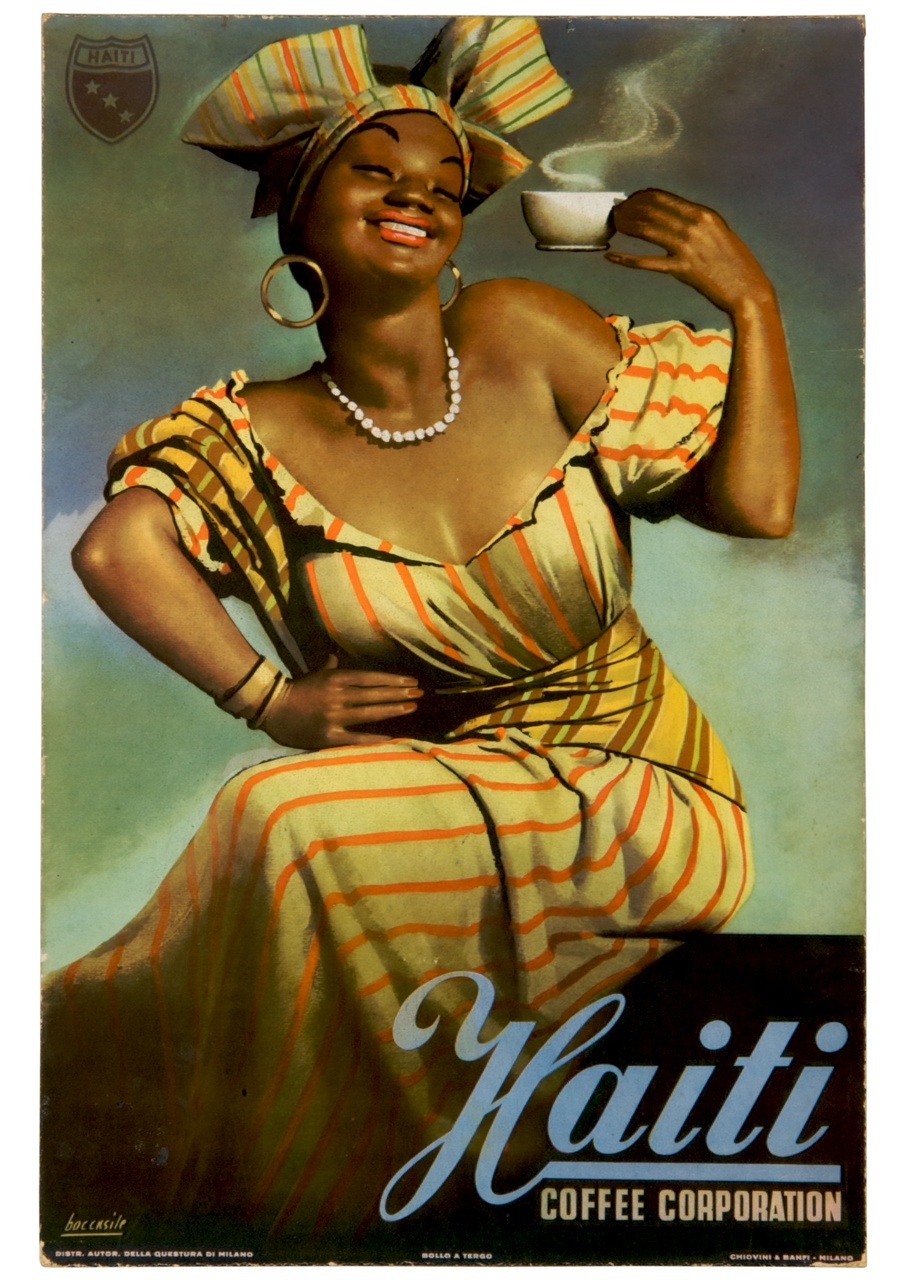
Advertising poster for the Haiti Coffee Corporation, 1948

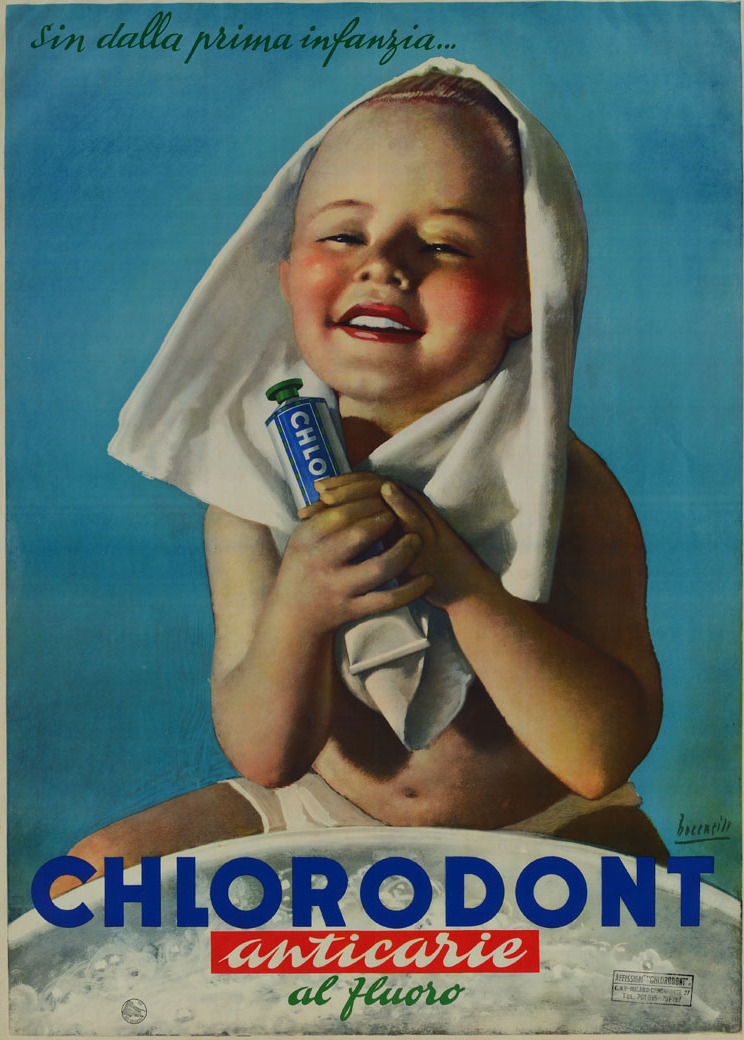
Advertising poster for Chlordont, 1950

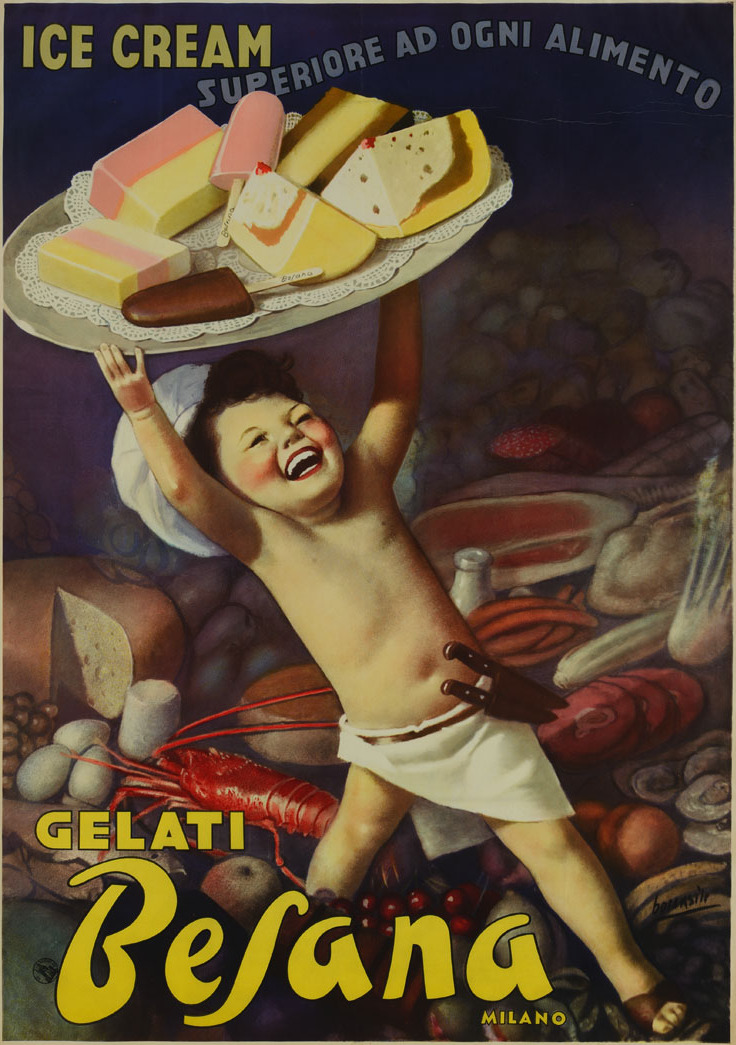
Advertising poster for Gelati Besana, 1951

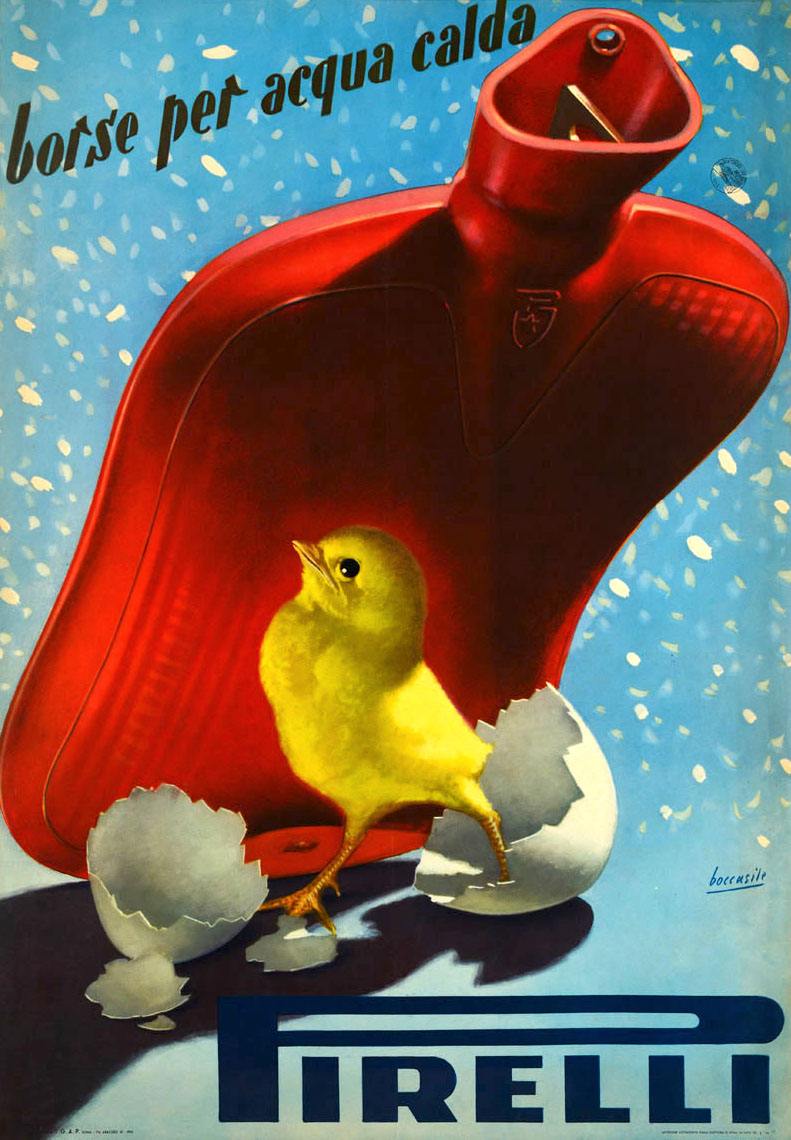
Advertising poster for Pirelli, 1952

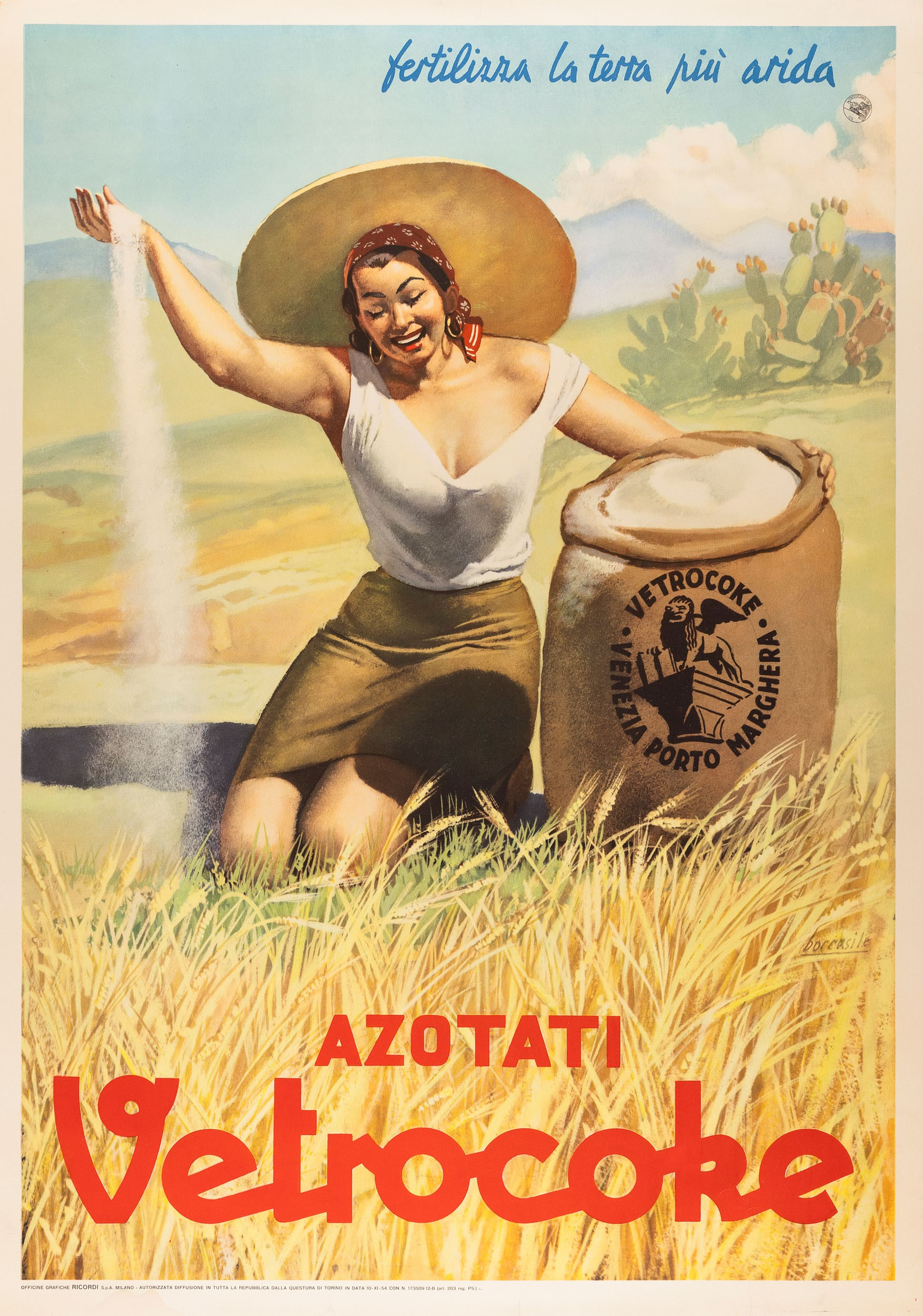
Advertising poster for Vetrocoke, 1954
