= Unione Nazionale Protezione Antiaerea =

Italian civil defense organization (1934–1946)

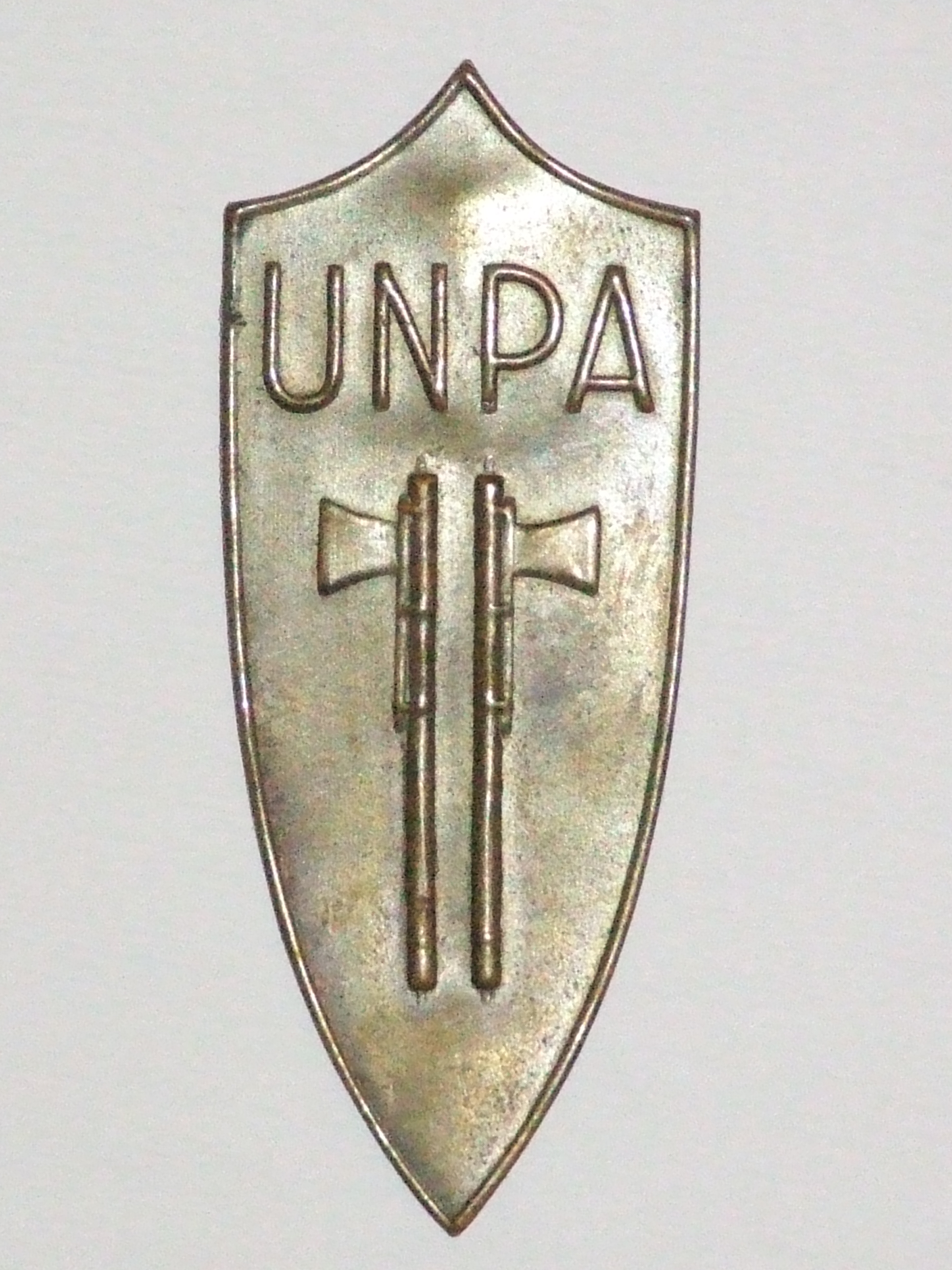
UNPA badge in use during the Italian Social Republic

The Unione Nazionale Protezione Antiaerea, or UNPA ("National Union for Anti-Aircraft Protection"), was a civil defense organisation set up in Italy during the Fascist regime and active during World War II. It was tasked with instructing the civilian population about how to behave in case of air raids, managing air raid shelters, and participating in rescue efforts after the raids.

The UNPA was established on 31 August 1934 as a volunteer organisation, reformed on 14 May 1936, and militarized on 18 June 1940, eight days after Italy's entry into the Second World War. In 1937 it had about 150,000 members, organized into provincial, municipal, and district commands; the central headquarters were located in Rome. UNPA members were authorized to move freely within the cities during air raids; they were not armed, with the exception of provincial commanders, but were equipped with helmets and gas masks. The uniform usually consisted of a grey or blue overall with the letters "UNPA" on the chest or back, but sometimes no uniform was worn with the exception of an armband.

In peacetime, UNPA held public exercises in which citizens were trained about properly donning gas masks, locate air raid shelters, and given basic instructions about behaviour in case of air raids. It also issued regulations aimed at minimizing the risk of fires in case of firebombing, such as ordering to remove all flammable materials from attics and ensuring that all buildings were provided with basic firefighting equipments such as shovels, pickaxes, fire extinguishers, buckets of water, sand and earth.

In 1941 UNPA was transferred under the control of the Ministry of the Interior; after the Armistice of Cassibile in September 1943, it remained active in the Italian Social Republic. The organisation was finally dissolved on 6 March 1946.
