= Gorla (district of Milan) =

- Quartiere of Milan
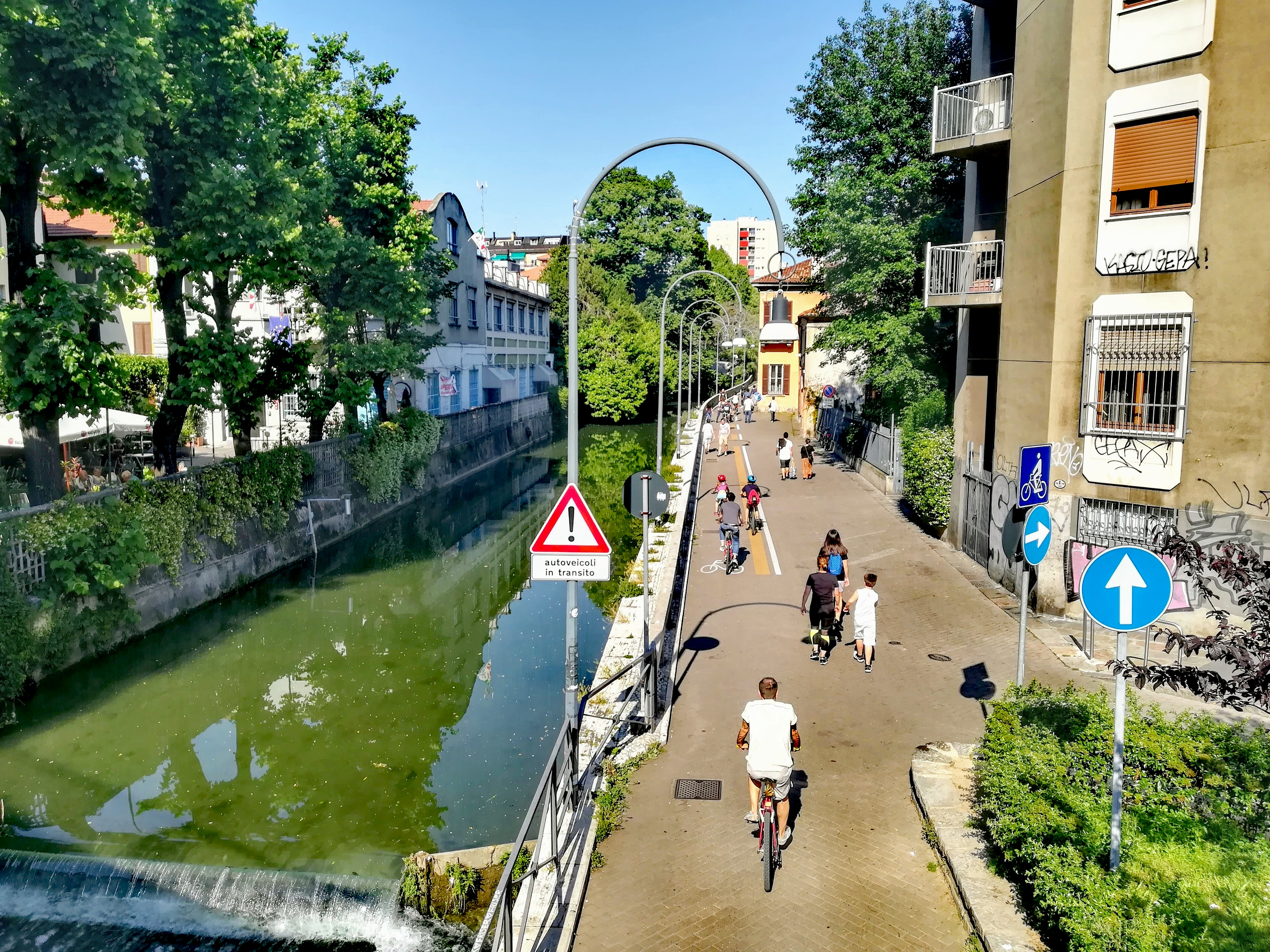
- View of the Naviglio della Martesana from Viale Monza.
- Interactive map of Gorla
- Coordinates: 45.5046°N 9.2242°E
- Country: Italy
- Region: Lombardy
- Province: Milan
- Comune: Milan
- Zone: 2
- Time zone: UTC+1 (CET)
  - Summer (DST): UTC+2 (CEST)

Gorla (Italian pronunciation: [ˈɡɔrla]; Lombard: Gòrla, same pronunciation) is a district ("quartiere") of Milan, Italy. It is part of the Zone 2 administrative division, located north-east of the city centre. Before 1923, Gorla was an independent comune. The name "Gorla" is probably derived from the latin word gulula, meaning "little cleft".

The district is traversed by Viale Monza, a major thoroughfare connecting Milan and Monza, as well as the Naviglio Martesana canal. The most prominent architectural feature of Gorla consists in a number of 19th Century villas that were built along the Naviglio Martesana and served as country residences for rich Milanese families.

== History ==
Gorla developed as a rural settlement until the late 19th century. Thereafter, the Milanese north-east quickly turned into an industrial area (most notably around Sesto San Giovanni), a process that affected Gorla as well. In 1864, Gorla became a formal "comune", named "Gorla Primo"; in 1920 Gorla and the bordering comune of Precotto merged into the new comune of Gorlaprecotto, a decision that was intended to preserve both comunes from being absorbed into Milan. Nevertheless, three years later, Gorlaprecotto was annexed to the city along with other 12 comunes.

=== Bombing of Gorla ===
During World War II, on 20 October 1944, Gorla was struck by American bombers in the Bombing of Gorla. As part of a larger operation to target industrial sites in Milan, an American bomber unit - intending to target the Breda works some 2.5 km from Gorla - made a navigational error and missed the Breda works, causing the formation to drift over Gorla. Upon realizing its course could not be corrected, the bomber unit dropped their bombs indiscriminately into the Po valley, with many bombs falling on Gorla. 614 civilians were killed in the bombings, include 184 children when a school was hit.

The victims are now remembered as "the Little Martyrs of Gorla", and a memorial was built where the killing had taken place; a museum dedicated to peace has also been established in the area. The mayor of Milan called for the US to apologize for the bombing in 2019.
