= Precotto =

- Quartier of Milan
- Interactive map of Precotto
- Coordinates: 45.512505°N 9.224589°E
- Country: Italy
- Region: Lombardy
- Province: Milan
- Comune: Milan
- Zone: 2
- Time zone: UTC+1 (CET)
  - Summer (DST): UTC+2 (CEST)

Precotto is a district ("quartiere") of Milan, Italy. It is part of the Zone 2 administrative division, located north-east of the city centre.

Until 1920, Precotto was an autonomous comune; then, it merged with the adjacent comune of Gorla into "Gorlaprecotto". In 1923, Gorlaprecotto was annexed to Milan.

The origin of name "Precotto" is disputed; while some scholars suggest that it might be from pree and cott in Lombard language, meaning "burnt grassland", others have it derive from Praecautum, supposedly the name of an old inn located on the road from Milan to Monza.
