= Porta Venezia (Milan Metro) =

Milan metro station

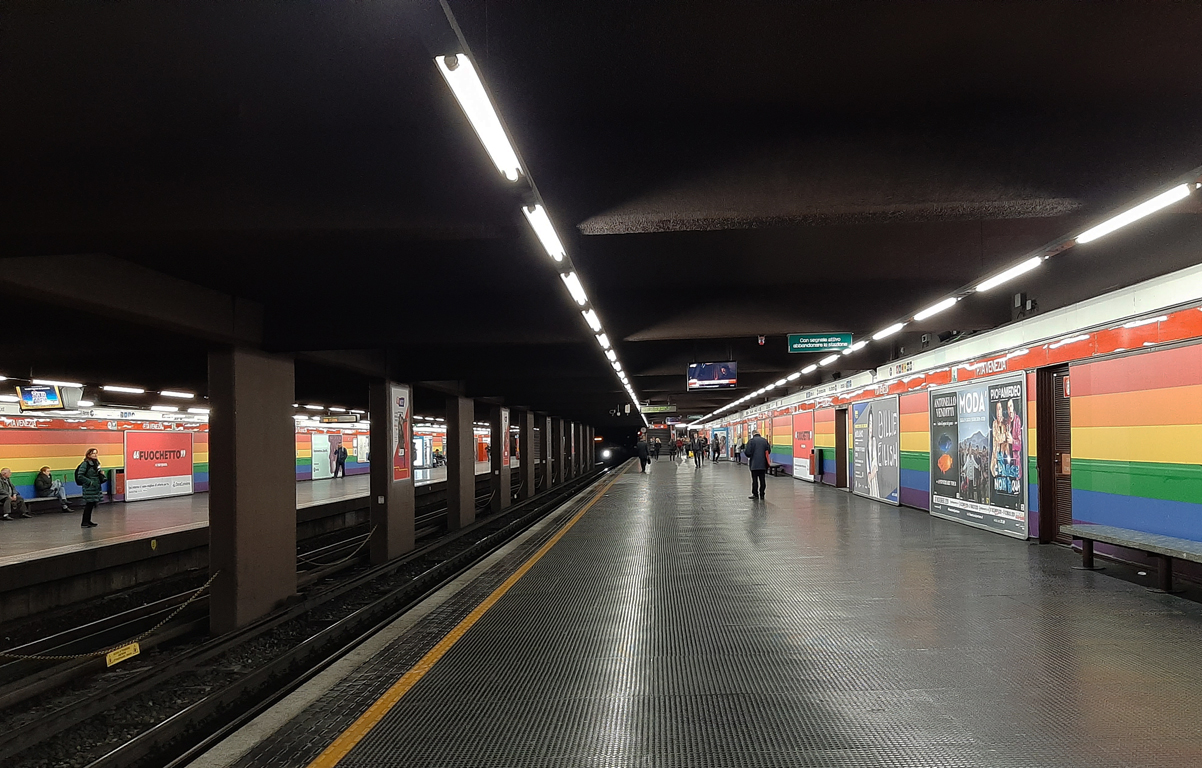

General information
- Location: Corso Buenos Aires north of Porta Venezia, Milan
- Coordinates: 45°28′30″N 9°12′20″E
- Owner: Azienda Trasporti Milanesi
- Platforms: 2
- Tracks: 2
- Connections: Milan P.ta Venezia railway station

Construction
- Structure type: Underground
- Accessible: y

Other information
- Fare zone: STIBM: Mi1

History
- Opened: 1 November 1964; 61 years ago

Services
Preceding station	Milan Metro	Following station
Palestro towards Rho Fiera or Bisceglie	Line 1	Lima towards Sesto 1º Maggio
Location
- Location within Milan Location within Lombardy Location within Northern Italy Location within Italy

Porta Venezia is an underground station on Line 1 of the Milan Metro. It was opened on 1 November 1964 as part of the inaugural section of the Metro, between Sesto Marelli and Lotto.

The station is located at Porta Venezia, in Corso Buenos Aires, near the Milan Natural History Museum.

The station offers an interchange with the Milan S Lines at Milano Porta Venezia station.

Since June 2018, the walls of the station have been decorated in the colors of the LGBT flag in support of gay pride, thanks to funding from sponsor Netflix. The intervention was supposed to be temporary, but, in August 2018, at the request of mayor Beppe Sala, ATM announced that the station will remain permanently decorated with the rainbow colors.
