= Lampugnano (Milan Metro) =

Milan metro station

Coordinates: 45.4895°N 9.1272°E

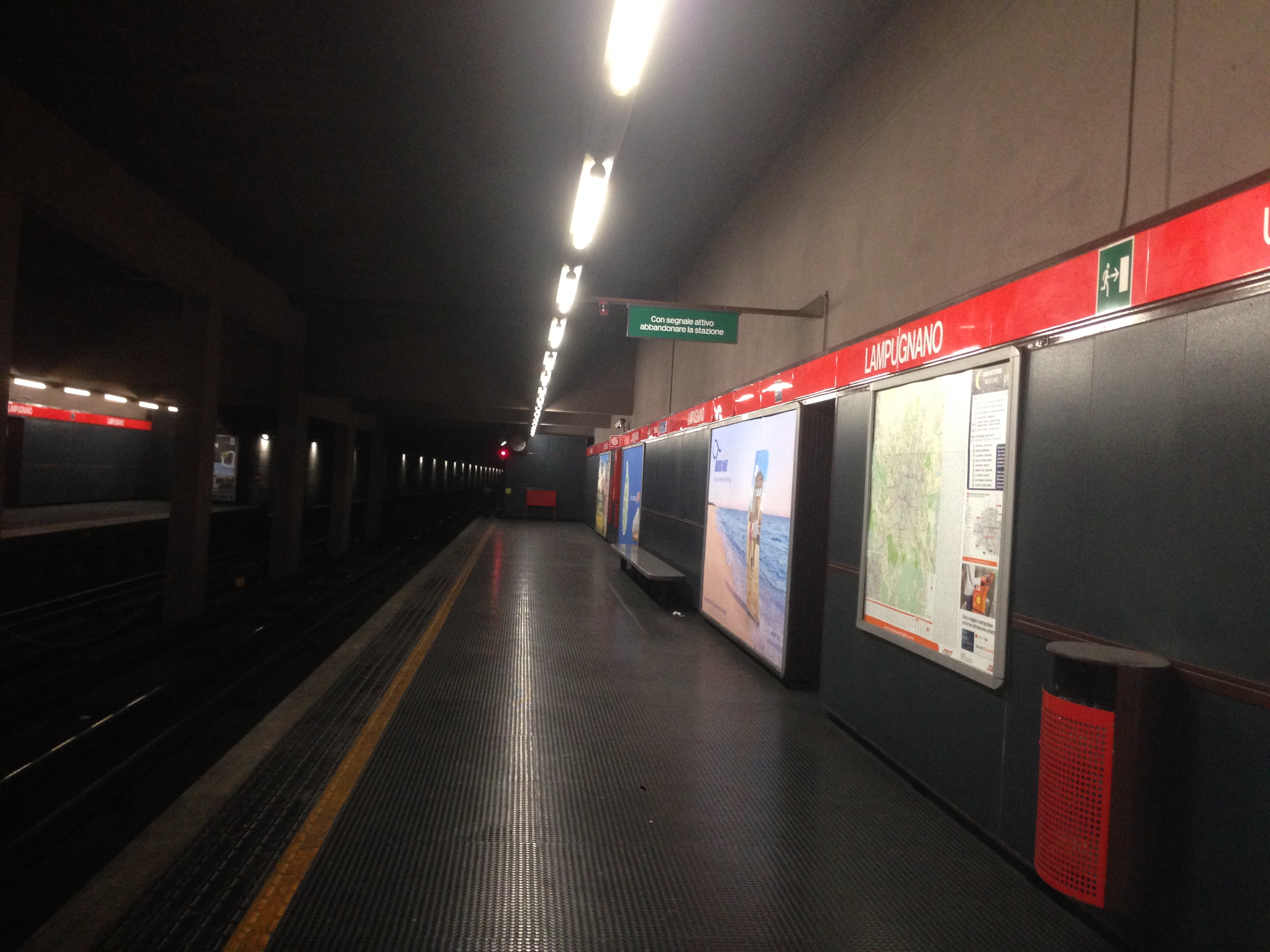

General information
- Location: Via Giulio Natta, Milan
- Owner: Azienda Trasporti Milanesi
- Platforms: 2
- Tracks: 2

Construction
- Structure type: Underground
- Accessible: yes

Other information
- Fare zone: STIBM: Mi1

History
- Opened: 12 April 1980; 46 years ago

Services
Preceding station	Milan Metro	Following station
Uruguay towards Rho Fiera	Line 1	QT8 towards Sesto 1º Maggio
Location
- Location within Milan Location within Lombardy Location within Northern Italy Location within Italy

Lampugnano is an underground station on Line 1 of the Milan Metro in Milan, Italy. The station was opened on 12 April 1980 as part of the extension from Lotto to San Leonardo. It is located on Via Giulio Natta, in the Lampugnano district, from which it takes its name. It is located near the Palasharp and the main terminal for intercity bus service.

The station has a car park with 1830 parking spaces.
