= Cordusio (Milan Metro) =

Milan metro station

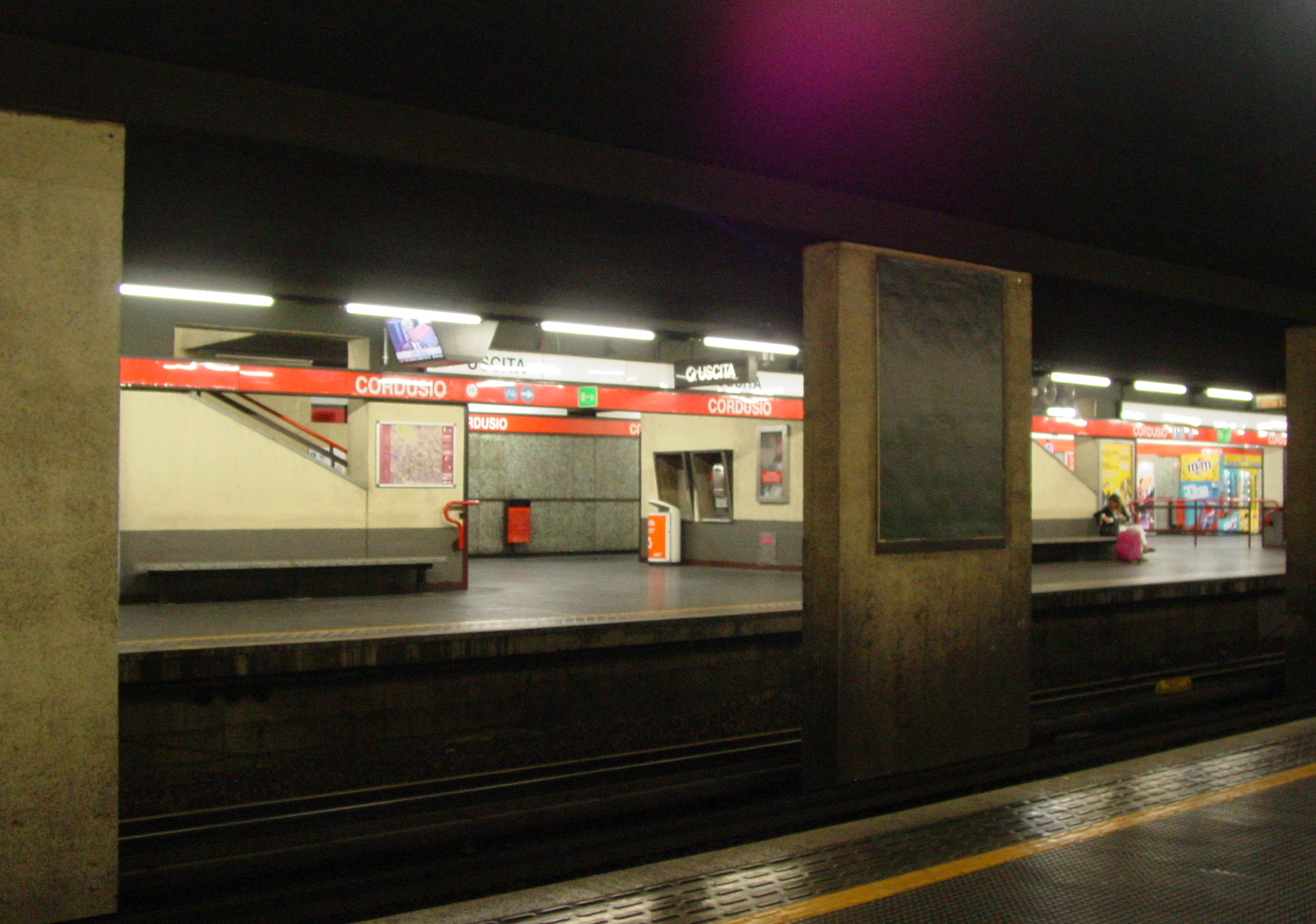

General information
- Location: Piazza Cordusio, Milan
- Coordinates: 45°27′56″N 9°11′11″E
- Owner: Azienda Trasporti Milanesi
- Platforms: 2
- Tracks: 2

Construction
- Structure type: Underground
- Accessible: Yes

Other information
- Fare zone: STIBM: Mi1

History
- Opened: 1 November 1964; 62 years ago

Services
Preceding station	Milan Metro	Following station
Cairoli towards Rho Fiera or Bisceglie	Line 1	Duomo towards Sesto 1º Maggio
Location
- Location within Milan Location within Lombardy Location within Northern Italy Location within Italy

Cordusio is a station on Line 1 of the Milan Metro in the busy, commercial Piazzale Cordusio. It was opened on 1 November 1964 as part of the inaugural section of the Metro, between Sesto Marelli and Lotto. The station is near the piazza del Duomo, and the long via Dante, which leads up to the Castello Sforzesco.

As with the square in which it is located, it takes its name from the Curia Ducis, the Court of Duke: this name dates back to the Longobard period.

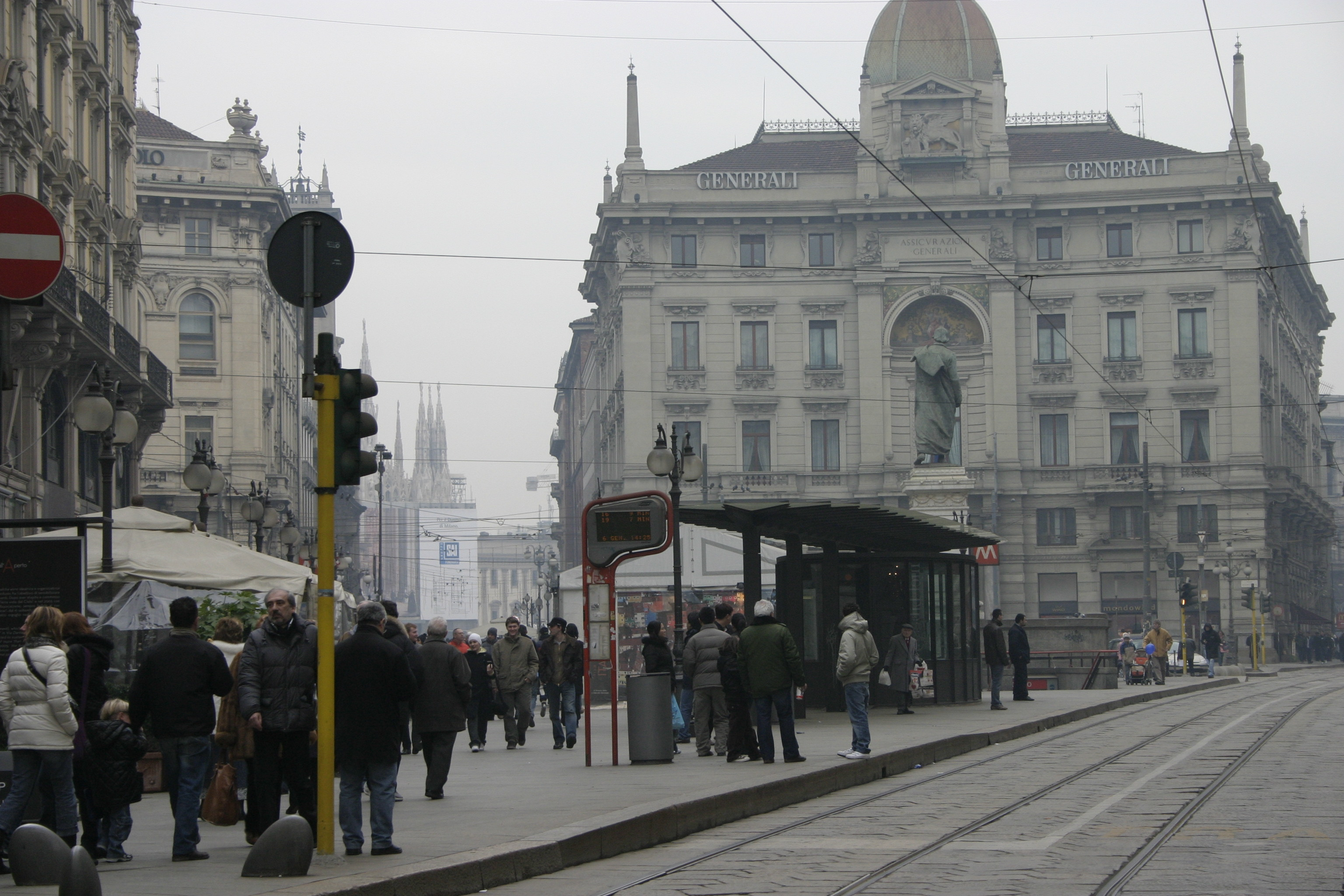
Entrance to the metro station beside the northbound tram stop on Via Dante. The Assicurazioni Generali building is in the background.
