= Loreto (Milan Metro) =

Milan metro station

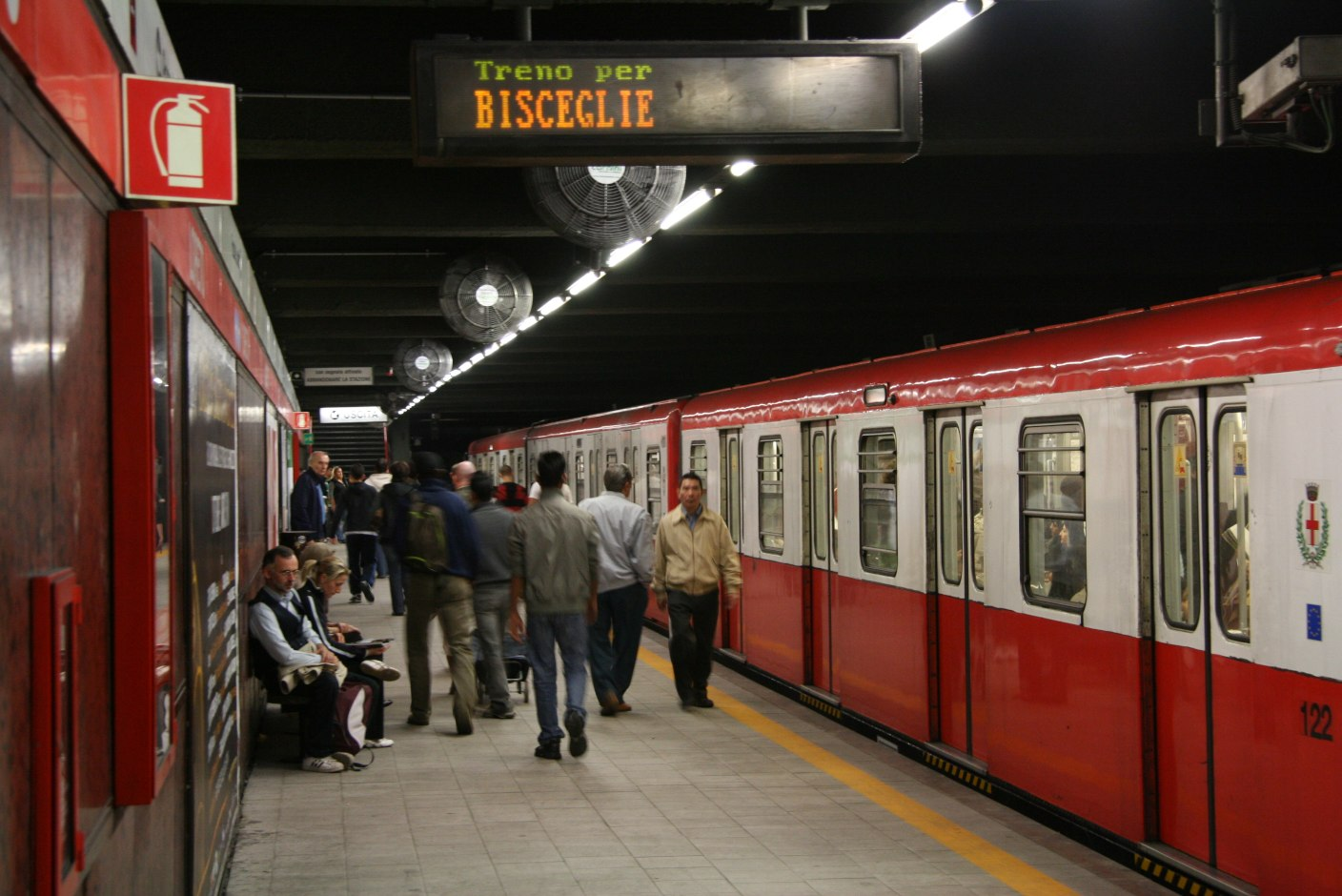

General information
- Location: Piazzale Loreto, Milan
- Coordinates: 45°29′10″N 9°13′01″E
- Owner: Azienda Trasporti Milanesi
- Platforms: 2 (line 1); 2 (line 2)
- Tracks: 2 (line 1); 2 (line 2)

Construction
- Structure type: Underground
- Platform levels: 2 (one per each line)
- Accessible: y

Other information
- Fare zone: STIBM: Mi1

History
- Opened: Line 1: 1 November 1964; 61 years ago Line 2: 27 September 1969; 56 years ago

Services
Preceding station	Milan Metro	Following station
Lima towards Rho Fiera or Bisceglie	Line 1	Pasteur towards Sesto 1º Maggio
Caiazzo towards Assago or Abbiategrasso	Line 2	Piola towards Cologno Nord or Gessate
Location
- Location within Milan Location within Lombardy Location within Northern Italy Location within Italy

Loreto is an interchange subway station serving Lines 1 and 2 of the Milan Metro. The Line 1 station was opened on 1 November 1964 as part of the inaugural section of the Metro, between Sesto Marelli and Lotto. The Line 2 station was opened on 27 September 1969 as part of the section between Cascina Gobba and Caiazzo.

The station is located at Piazzale Loreto within the municipal area of Milan. It is a very busy station. This is an underground station, with two tracks in a single tunnel for Line 1 over two tracks in one tunnel for Line 2.

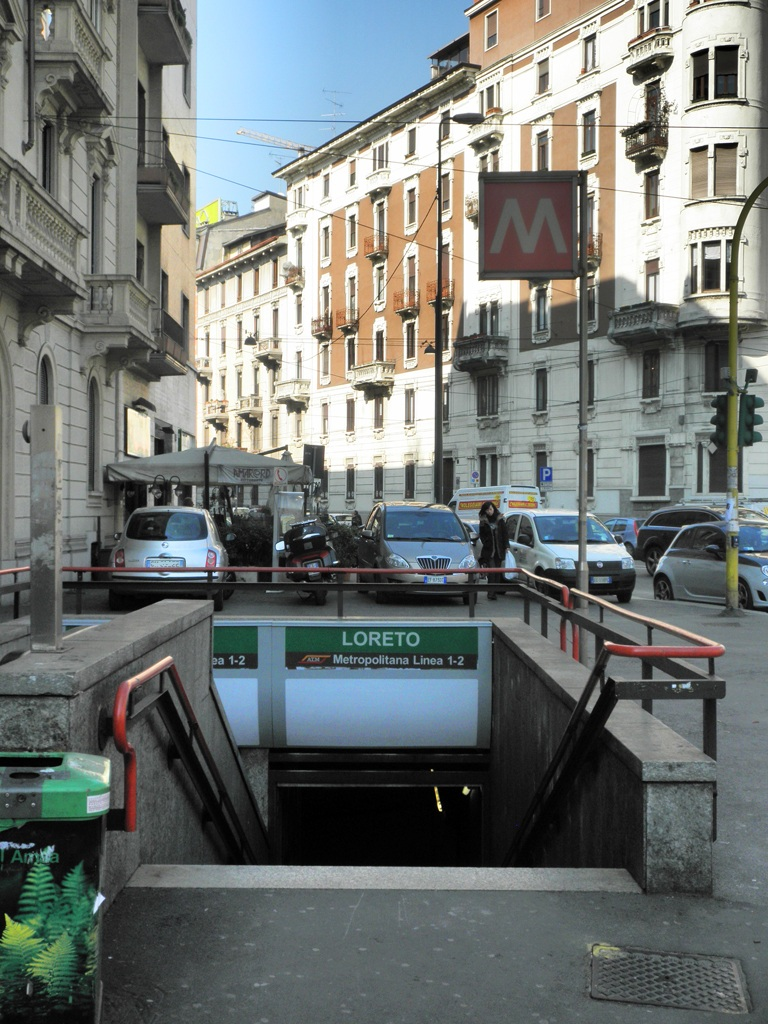
