= Pasteur (Milan Metro) =

Milan metro station

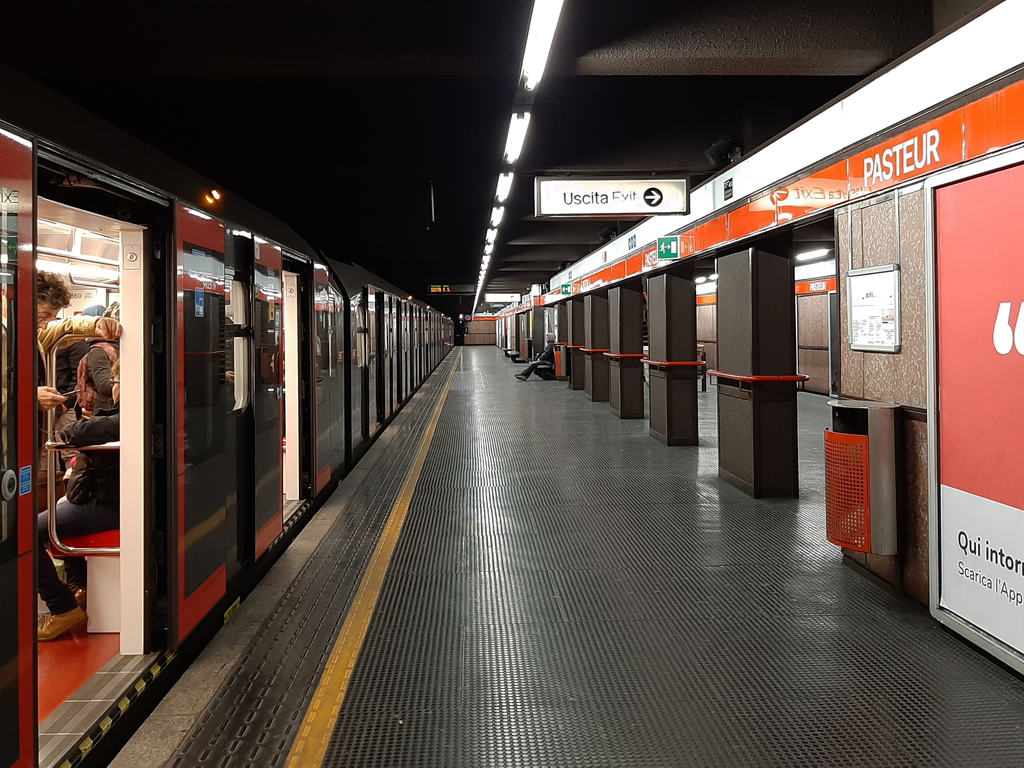

General information
- Location: Viale Monza, Milan
- Coordinates: 45°29′26.6″N 9°13′05″E
- Owner: Azienda Trasporti Milanesi
- Platforms: 2
- Tracks: 2

Construction
- Structure type: Underground

Other information
- Fare zone: STIBM: Mi1

History
- Opened: 1 November 1964; 61 years ago

Services
Preceding station	Milan Metro	Following station
Loreto towards Rho Fiera or Bisceglie	Line 1	Rovereto towards Sesto 1º Maggio
Location
- Location within Milan Location within Lombardy Location within Northern Italy Location within Italy

Pasteur is a station on Line 1 of the Milan Metro. It was opened on 1 November 1964 as part of the inaugural section of the Metro, between Sesto Marelli and Lotto.

The station is located at the beginning of Viale Monza, which is in the municipality of Milan. This is an underground station with two tracks in a single tunnel.
