= Conciliazione (Milan Metro) =

Milan metro station

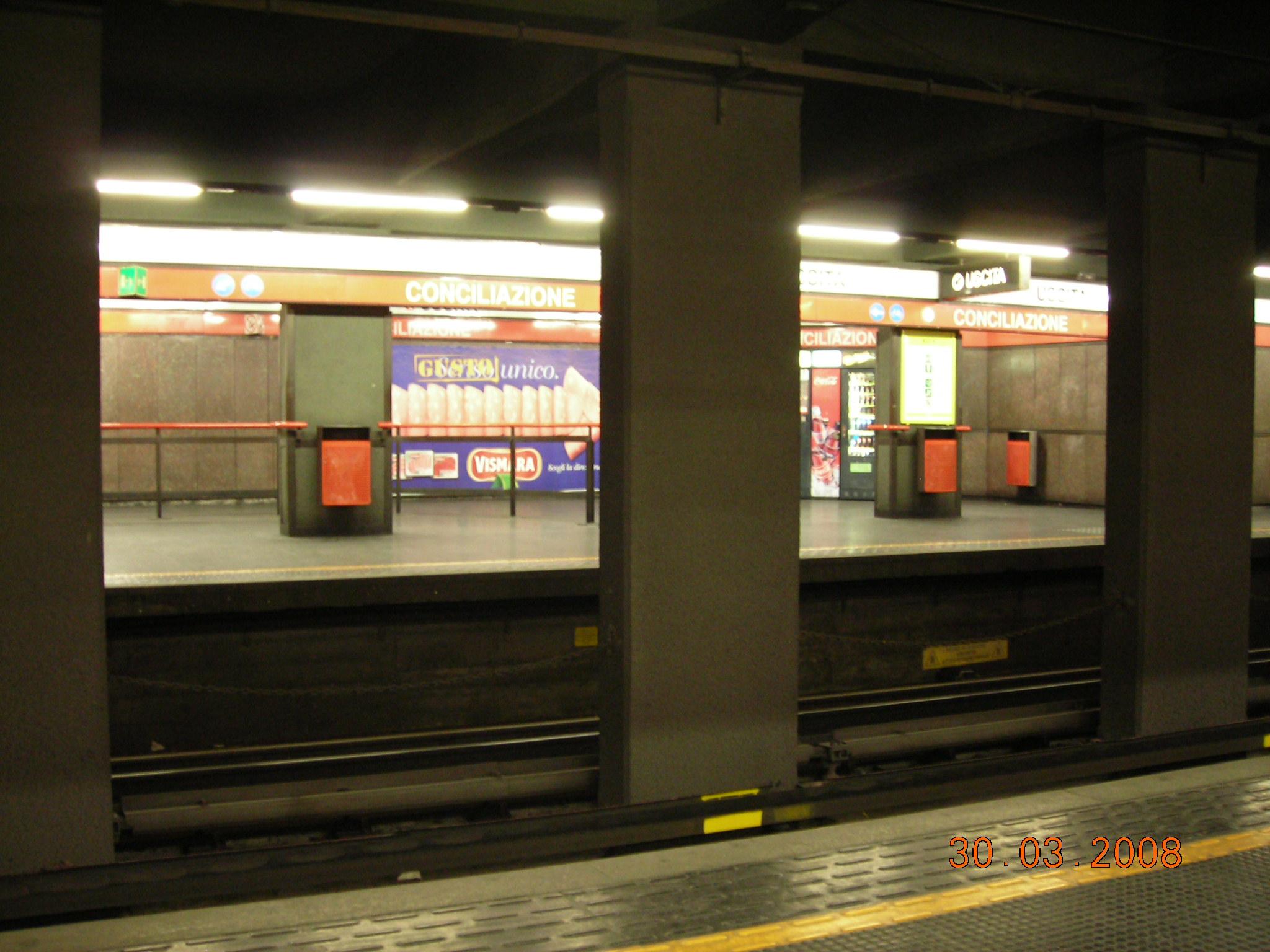

General information
- Location: Piazza della Conciliazione, Milan
- Coordinates: 45°28′03″N 9°09′59″E
- Owner: Azienda Trasporti Milanesi
- Platforms: 2
- Tracks: 2

Construction
- Structure type: Underground

Other information
- Fare zone: STIBM: Mi1

History
- Opened: 1 November 1964; 61 years ago

Services
Preceding station	Milan Metro	Following station
Pagano towards Rho Fiera or Bisceglie	Line 1	Cadorna towards Sesto 1º Maggio
Location
- Location within Milan Location within Lombardy Location within Northern Italy Location within Italy

Conciliazione is an underground station on Line 1 of the Milan Metro. It was opened on 1 November 1964 as part of the inaugural section of the Metro, between Sesto Marelli and Lotto.

The station is located at Piazza della Conciliazione, at the border of the city centre of Milan.
