= Lima station =

Lima station could refer to:

- Lima (Buenos Aires Underground), a subway station in Buenos Aires, Argentina
- Lima (Milan Metro), a subway station in Milan, Italy
- Lima station (Pennsylvania Railroad), a disused train station in Lima, Ohio
