= Palestro (Milan Metro) =

Milan metro station

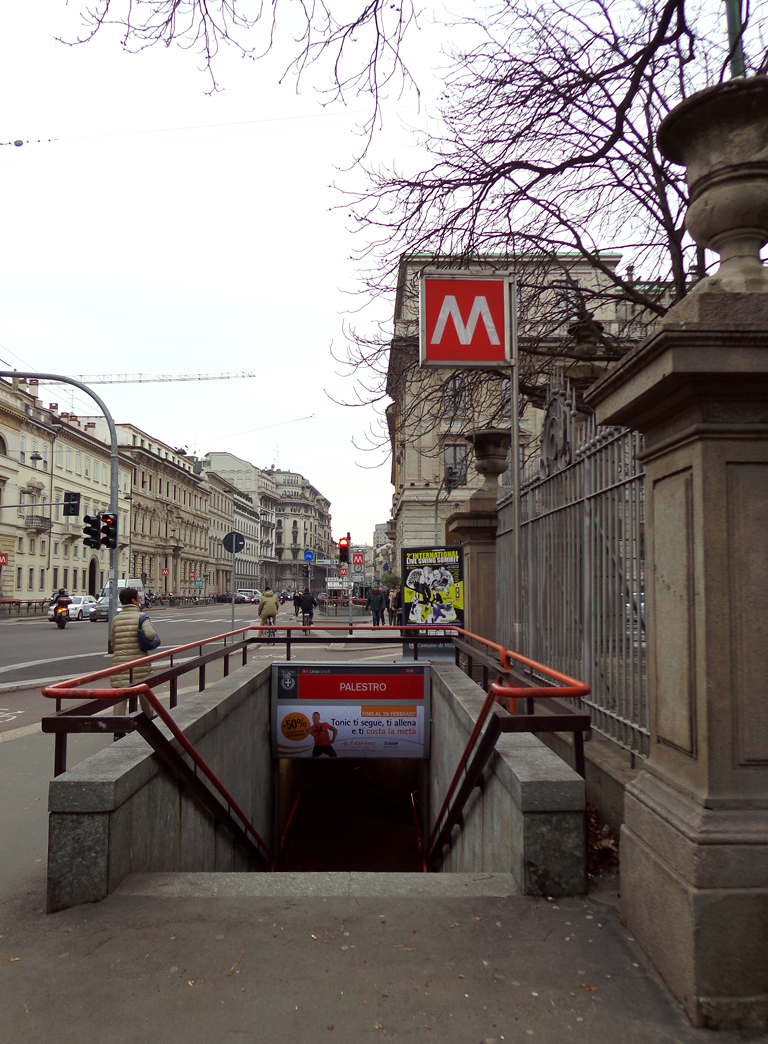

General information
- Location: Corso Venezia south of Via Palestro, Milan
- Coordinates: 45°28′17″N 9°12′07″E
- Owner: Azienda Trasporti Milanesi
- Platforms: 2
- Tracks: 2

Construction
- Structure type: Underground
- Accessible: y

Other information
- Fare zone: STIBM: Mi1

History
- Opened: 1 November 1964; 61 years ago

Services
Preceding station	Milan Metro	Following station
San Babila towards Rho Fiera or Bisceglie	Line 1	Porta Venezia towards Sesto 1º Maggio
Location
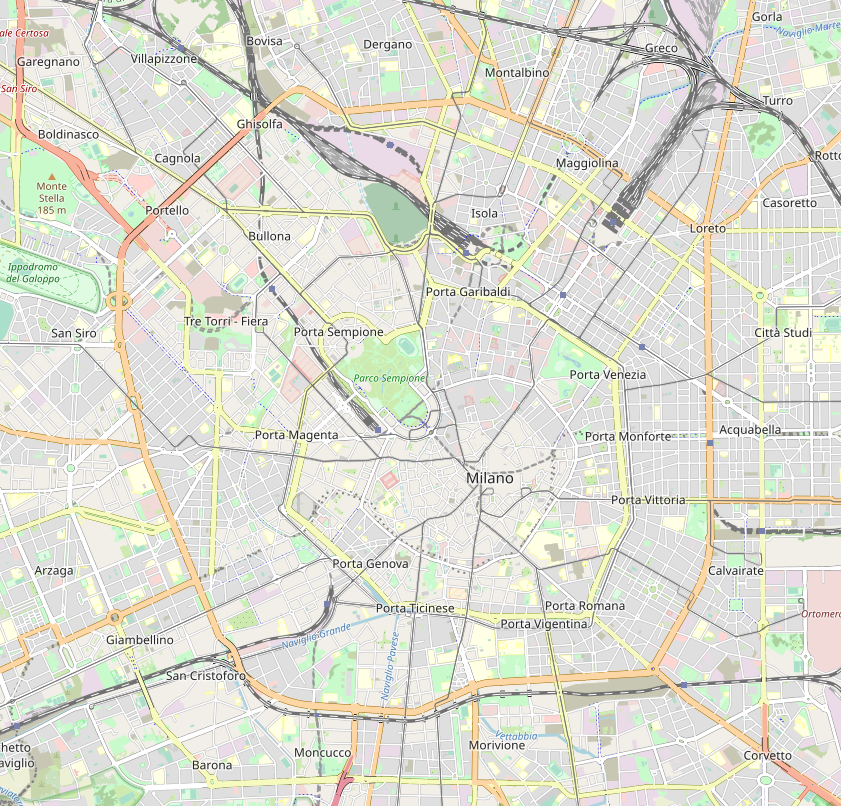
- Location within Milan Location within Lombardy Location within Northern Italy Location within Italy

Palestro is an underground station on Line 1 of the Milan Metro. It was opened on 1 November 1964 as part of the inaugural section of the Metro, between Sesto Marelli and Lotto.

The station is located on Corso Venezia, near the junction with Via Palestro, within the city centre of Milan just outside the core area. It is near the Civic Museum of Natural History.
