= Palestro (disambiguation) =

Palestro is a town and commune in Italy, in the province of Pavia.

Palestro may also refer to:

== Events ==
- Battle of Palestro, May 1859
- Ambush of Palestro, May 1956
- Via Palestro massacre, in Milan in July 1993

== Vessels ==
- Palestro-class ironclad floating battery, used by the French Navy c. 1860
- Italian ironclad Palestro, in use 1875–1895
- Palestro, French Navarin-class minesweeper, launched 1918
- Palestro-class torpedo boat, used by the Italian Royal Navy c. 1920s–1940s

== Other uses ==
- Palestro (Milan Metro), a station on the Line 1 of Milan Metro
- Lakhdaria, formerly Palestro, a town in northern Algeria, in the Bouira Province
