= Cairoli (Milan Metro) =

Milan metro station

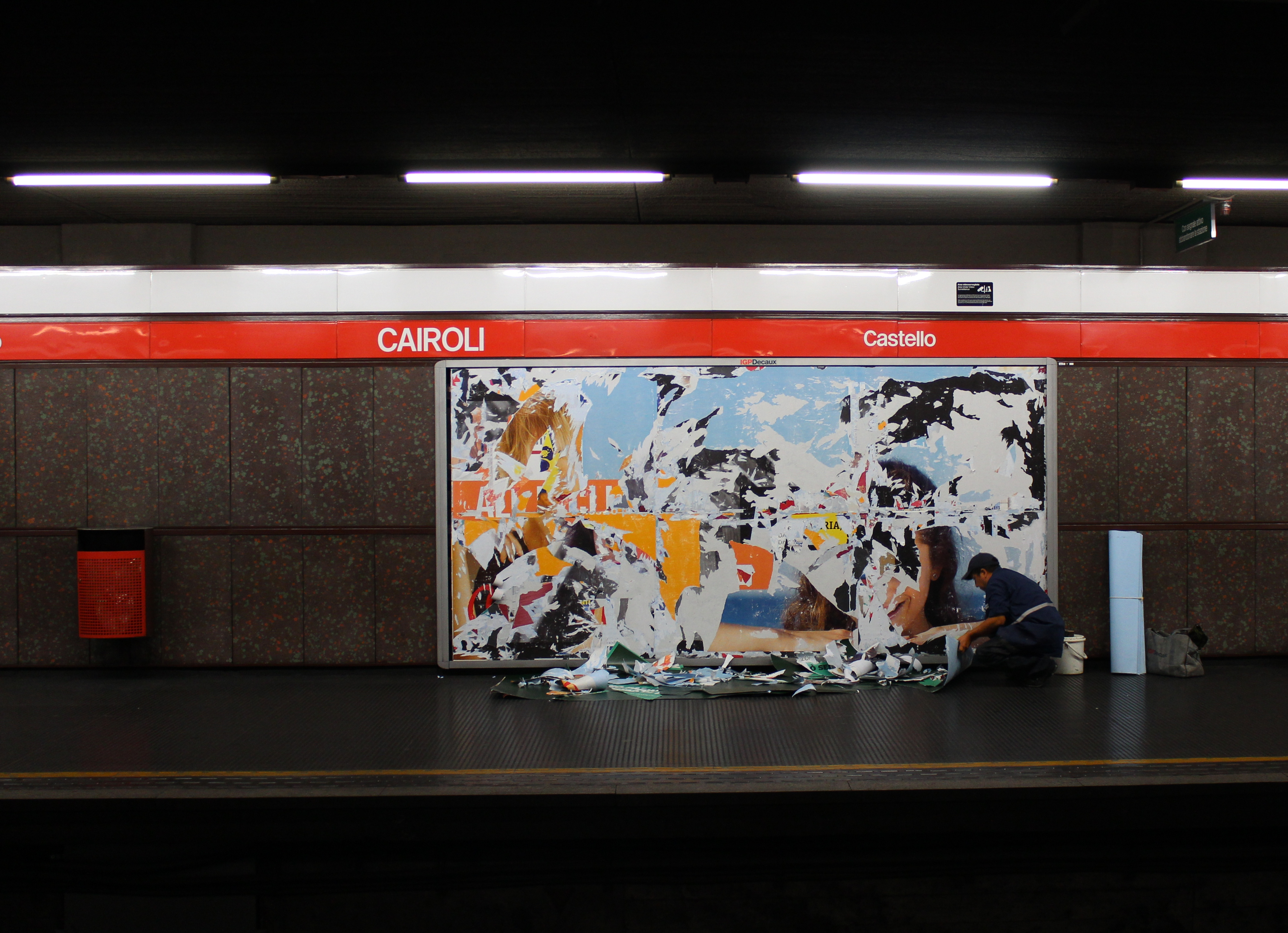

General information
- Location: Largo Cairoli, Milan
- Coordinates: 45°28′05″N 9°10′56″E
- Owner: Azienda Trasporti Milanesi
- Platforms: 2
- Tracks: 2

Construction
- Structure type: Underground
- Accessible: y

Other information
- Fare zone: STIBM: Mi1

History
- Opened: 1 November 1964; 61 years ago

Services
Preceding station	Milan Metro	Following station
Cadorna towards Rho Fiera or Bisceglie	Line 1	Cordusio towards Sesto 1º Maggio
Location
- Location within Milan Location within Lombardy Location within Northern Italy Location within Italy

Cairoli is a station on Line 1 of the Milan Metro. It was opened on 1 November 1964 as part of the inaugural section of the Metro, between Sesto Marelli and Lotto.

The station is located in Largo Benedetto Cairoli, near the Sforzesco Castle, in the centre of Milan.
