= Porta Venezia =

- Quartiere of Milan
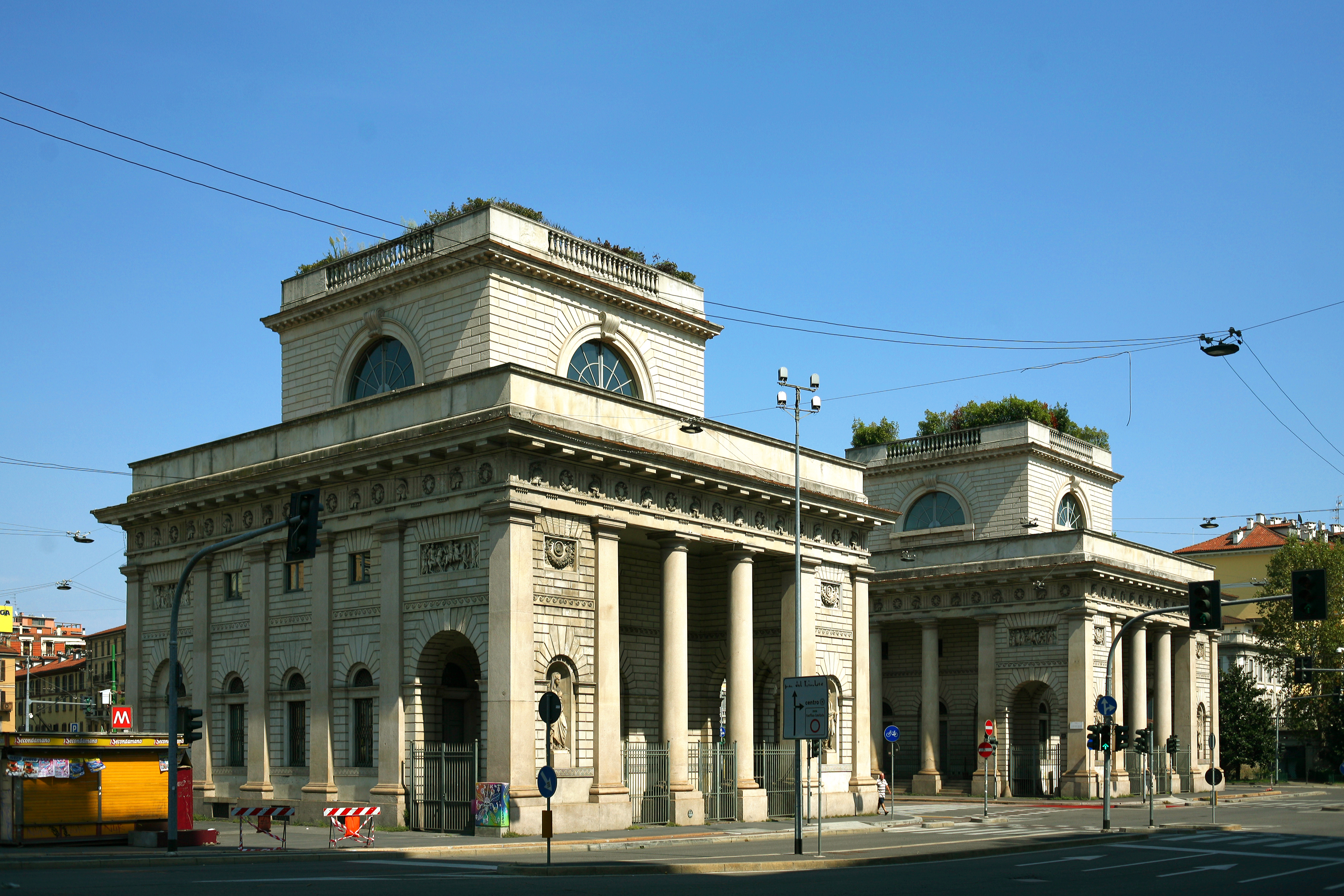
- Porta Venezia
- Interactive map of Porta Venezia
- Coordinates: 45°28′27.87″N 9°12′18.01″E
- Country: Italy
- Region: Lombardy
- Province: Milan
- Comune: Milan
- Zone: 3
- Time zone: UTC+1 (CET)
  - Summer (DST): UTC+2 (CEST)

Porta Venezia (Italian pronunciation: [ˈpɔrta veˈnɛttsja]; "Venice Gate"), formerly known as Porta Orientale ("Eastern Gate"), Porta Renza ("Laurence Gate") and by other names, is one of the historical gates of the city of Milan, Italy. In its present form, the gate dates back to the 19th century; nevertheless, its origins can be traced back to the medieval and even the Roman walls of the city.

The name Porta Venezia is commonly used to refer both to the gate proper and to the surrounding district (quartiere), part of the Zone 3 of Milan.

The Porta Venezia area is known today as the LGBT-friendly district of Milan: Via Lecco and its surroundings are Milan's "Gay Street" with LGBT or LGBT-themed bars and restaurants. In 2019, after a commercial advertisement campaign by Netflix Italia for the 2018 Milano Pride, Mayor Giuseppe Sala announced that the Porta Venezia metro station would have become a Rainbow Station, thanks to the agreement with the ATM metro service: the rainbow colored wallpaper would have been indefinitely kept making Porta Venezia Italy's first official LGBT-dedicated urban transport stop.

== Naming ==
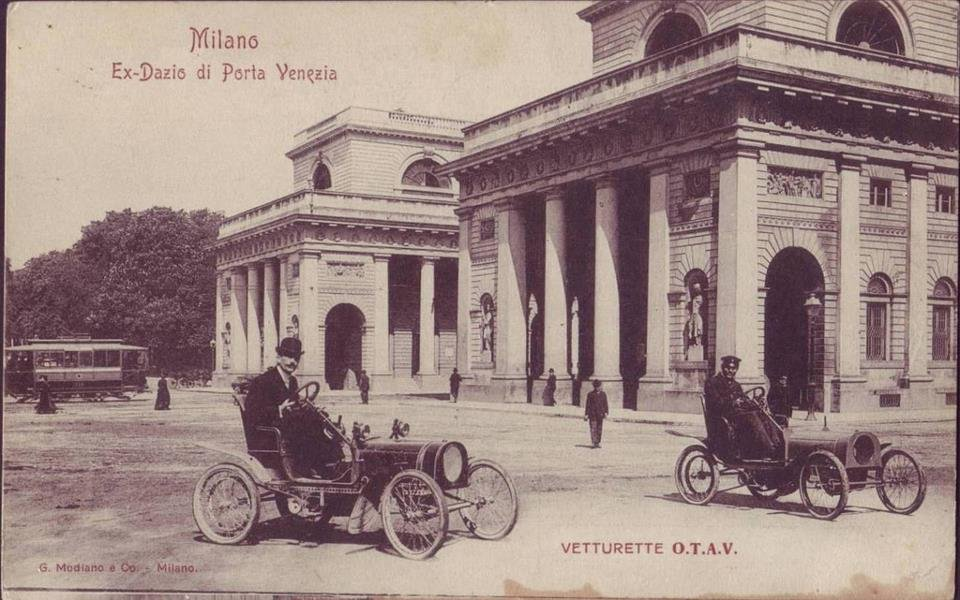
Porta Venezia in 1906

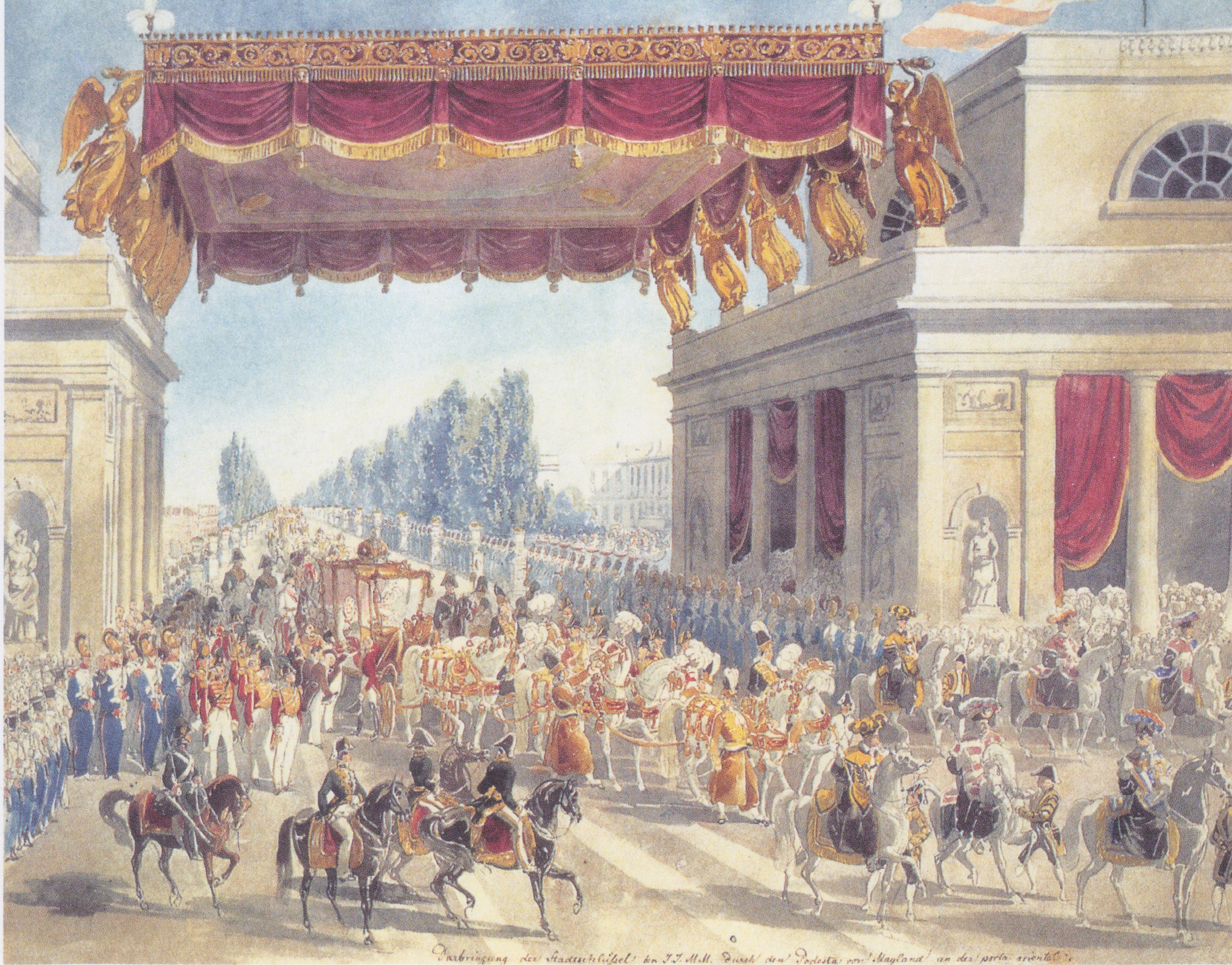
A watercolor painting by Eduard Gurk, entitled Darbringung der Stadtschlüssel an I.I.M.M. durch den Podestà von Mailand an der Porta Orientale (1838)

The name "Porta Venezia" (literally: "Venice Gate") was formally given in 1862, possibly in the hope that Venice would soon join Milan in the newly born Kingdom of Italy. Previously, the gate was mostly called "Porta Orientale", with "Porta Renza" being another widely used name. This latter name has been consistently in use through the centuries; for example, it is referred to in Francesco Guicciardini's History of Italy, dating back to the mid-16th century, as well as in Giovanni Verga's works of the late 19th century, and is still remembered (although not commonly used) by the Milanese population today. Stendhal, who lived in Milan, uses a variation Porta Rense.

The origin and meaning of former names of Porta Venezia are disputed. While "Porta Orientale" has an obvious meaning in Italian ("Eastern Gate"), this is partially inconsistent, as the gate faces north-east rather than east; Porta Vittoria would in fact be the truly "eastern" gate of Milan. Furthermore, Milanese gates are not, in general, named after cardinal directions, but rather after the places they lead to. As a consequence, some scholars argue that "Porta Orientale" might actually be a corruption of "Porta Renza", rather than the other way round, as some have suggested.

As "Renza" has no obvious meaning in Italian, this is usually regarded as a popular corruption of another name, although there is no general consensus on what the original name might be. A widespread urban legend has "Porta Renza" derive from Renzo Tramaglino, protagonist of Alessandro Manzoni's The Betrothed, who enters Milan from this gate (something that is remembered by a plaque in Corso Venezia); yet, the name "Porta Renza" is much older than Manzoni's novel, as the reference in Guicciardini's works proves. Other candidates to be the original form of "Porta Renza" are "Porta Argentea" (or "Argenzia") and "Porta Fiorenza", both of which have been used in the past. The name "Porta Argentea", in turn, is possibly derived from the name of a settlement in the area of Gorgonzola or Crescenzago ("Argentiacum" or "Argentia").

== History ==
Coat of arms of the medieval rione of "Porta Orientale"

A gate whose location and direction roughly correspond to those of modern Porta Venezia was already part of the Roman walls of Milan (then Mediolanum), which were expanded in the Middle Ages. It connected Milan to eastern Brianza and Bergamo. In the 16th century, the medieval walls were replaced by the Spanish walls, which enclosed a larger area; correspondingly, the gate leading to Bergamo was moved farther away from the city centre to the place it is located today.

Over time, the walls lost their defensive purpose, and so did the gates, which were adapted as customs tax stations. During the Austrian Empire rule, between 1783 and 1786, the walls in the Porta Venezia area were redesigned, and avenues and city parks were created in the area; yet the gate itself remained.

Under Napoleonic rule, and especially during Francesco Melzi d'Eril's mandate as the Vice-president of the Italian Republic, the Spanish gates of Milan were demolished and replaced with new ones, which would both serve as tax stations and reflect, in their architecture, the prestige of Milan, elected capital of the Republic. The renewal of Porta Venezia was commissioned to architect Giuseppe Piermarini, who is responsible for a large part of the renewal of Milan and the Milanese in the late 18th Century (for example, he designed La Scala, Palazzo Belgioioso, part of the Pinacoteca di Brera, as well as the sumptuous Villa Reale in Monza). Piermarini made plans for the renewal of the gate in neoclassic style, but died (in 1805) before the plan was realized. Piermarini's work was continued by his student Luigi Cagnola, who built a first temporary triumphal arch to celebrate the visit of Eugène de Beauharnais. He then proceeded to the final design, which was still incomplete in 1825 when Emperor Francis II visited Milan.

The gate was completed between 1827 and 1828 with the addition of customs offices designed by Rodolfo Vantini. The neoclassical bas-reliefs and statues were added in 1833.

Until recently, they were largely covered by advertising posters; in 2004 these posters were removed and the buildings restored, returning them to their 19th-century appearance.

== Location and structure ==
The gate of Porta Venezia consists of two twin neoclassical buildings, that used to house customs offices, located on the opposite sides of the main street that was used to enter Milan from north-east; today, this street is called "Corso Venezia" outside the gate, and Corso Buenos Aires past the gate. Each building has doric porticos on three sides, bas-relief-adornated architraves, and a set of four niches each hosting a statue. Bas-relief and statues, coherently with the building structure, are of classical taste, and reproduce Roman deities and subjects. The right-hand side building statues represent Minerva, Ceres, Eternity and Faithfulness, while those of the left-hand side building are Mercury, Vulcan, Abundance and Justice. The buildings are mostly made of Viggiù sandstone.

== The district ==
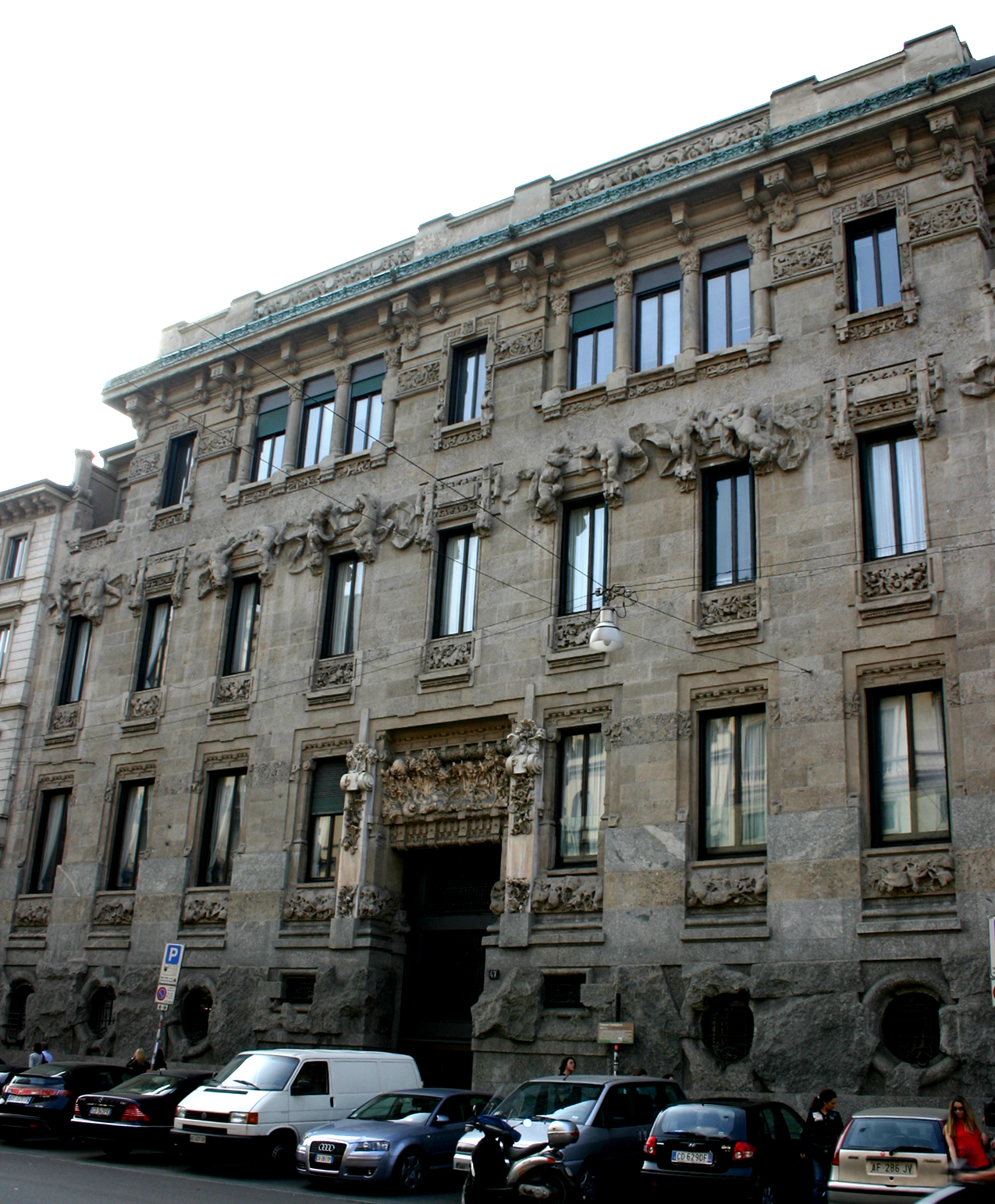
Palazzo Castiglioni in Corso Venezia

The area surrounding Porta Venezia has been recognized as a distinct "rione" (the medieval equivalent of the modern "quartiere", i.e., a district) since the 12th century. The rione had its coat of arms, a black rampant lion on silver background. As the modern notion of district ("quartiere") is informal, there is no official definition of the boundaries of the Porta Venezia district. Areas that are usually referred to as being "in the Porta Venezia district" include Piazza Oberdan (the main square adjacent to the gates), Corso Buenos Aires, Corso Venezia, the Gardens of Porta Venezia (housing the Museum of Natural History and the Planetarium), Via Sirtori, Via Lecco, Via Vittor Pisani, Viale Vittorio Veneto, Via Casati, Via Melzo and Viale Tunisia.

Despite the district having a medieval origin, most of the surviving architecture in the area is from the 19th and 20th Century, with neoclassicism and Art Nouveau being the prominent styles. Some of the most important buildings in the area include Palazzo Saporiti, Palazzo Serbelloni, Palazzo Castiglioni and Villa Reale. The Gardens of Porta Venezia (recently renamed "Indro Montanelli Gardens") house the Museum of Natural History as well as the Planetarium.

The district has a long history of foreign immigration and has developed over the last decades as one of the multi-ethnic areas of Milan, to the point that it is sometimes referred to as Milan's "African district" or Milan's casbah. Another specific trait of Porta Venezia is the number of night life venues, such as restaurants (many of them started by immigrants and serving African, Asian, or South American cuisine) and "trendy" and underground night clubs; for this reason, Porta Venezia is one of the centres of the so-called "Milanese movida". The district also houses some of the most important LBGT venues in Milan, such as the "Lelephant" and the "Atomic Bar".

The district has both a minor railway station (Stazione di Porta Venezia) and several stops of the Milan Metro subway (Line 1).

Porta Venezia is the crossroads of three of the city's different worlds: the elegance of Porta Nuova; the bustle of Corso Buenos Aires with its increasing immigrant population; and the more conventional Porta Romana. Along Corso Buenos Aires, there are large department stores, cheap clothing boutiques and shoe shops, as well as supermarkets.

== See also ==
- Corso Buenos Aires
- Museo Civico di Storia Naturale di Milano
- Planetario di Milano
