= QT8 (Milan Metro) =

Milan metro station

Coordinates: 45.4860°N 9.1372°E

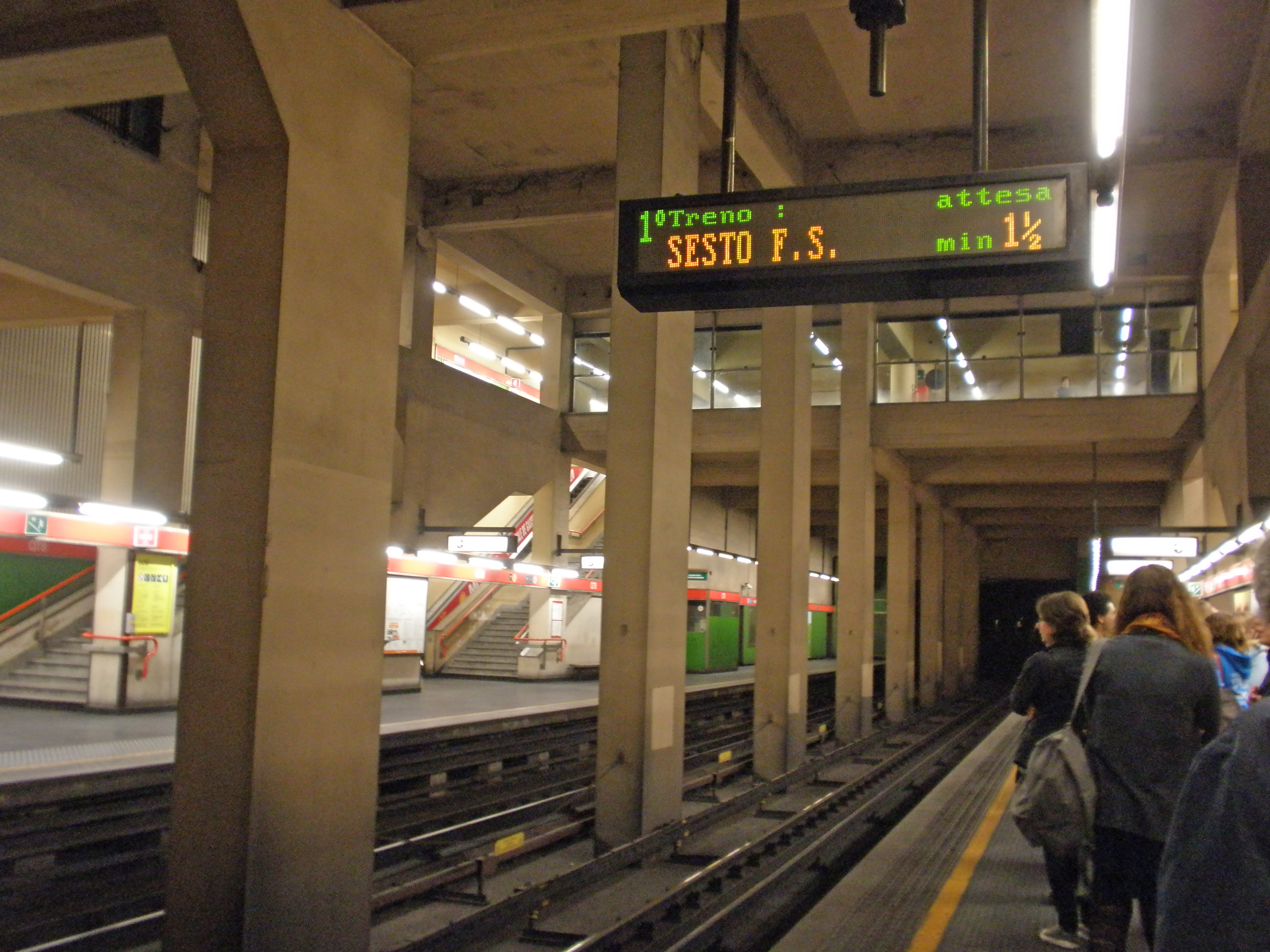

General information
- Location: Piazza Santa Maria Nascente, Milan
- Owner: Azienda Trasporti Milanesi
- Platforms: 2
- Tracks: 2

Construction
- Structure type: Underground

Other information
- Fare zone: STIBM: Mi1

History
- Opened: 8 November 1975; 50 years ago

Services
Preceding station	Milan Metro	Following station
Lampugnano towards Rho Fiera	Line 1	Lotto towards Sesto 1º Maggio
Location
- Location within Milan Location within Lombardy Location within Northern Italy Location within Italy

QT8 is a station on Line 1 of the Milan Metro in Milan, Italy. The underground station was opened on 8 November 1975 as a one-station extension from Lotto. On 12 April 1980, the line was extended to San Leonardo. It is located at Piazza Santa Maria Nascente, in the QT8 district.
