= Amendola (Milan Metro) =

Milan metro station

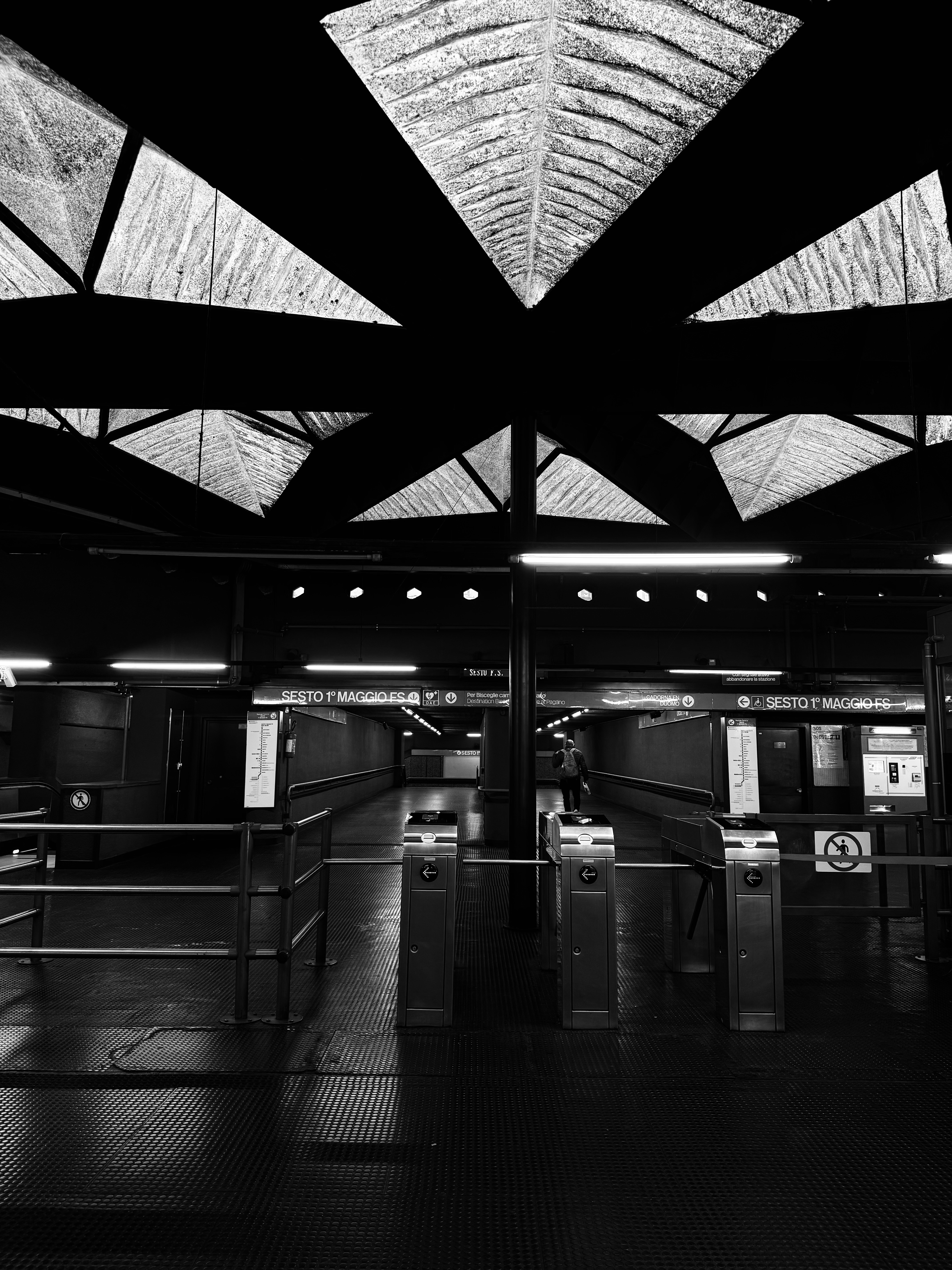

General information
- Location: Piazza Giovanni Amendola, Milan
- Coordinates: 45°28′24″N 9°09′04″E
- Owner: Azienda Trasporti Milanesi
- Platforms: 2
- Tracks: 2

Construction
- Structure type: Underground
- Accessible: yes

Other information
- Fare zone: STIBM: Mi1

History
- Opened: 1 November 1964; 61 years ago

Services
Preceding station	Milan Metro	Following station
Lotto towards Rho Fiera	Line 1	Buonarroti towards Sesto 1º Maggio
Location
- Location within Milan Location within Lombardy Location within Northern Italy Location within Italy

Amendola is a station on Line 1 of the Milan Metro in Milan, Italy. The underground station was opened on 1 November 1964 as part of the inaugural section of the Metro, between Sesto Marelli and Lotto. It is located at Piazza Giovanni Amendola.
