= Via Dante, Milan =

Pedestrian street in Milan, Italy

Coordinates: 45.467°N 9.18388°E

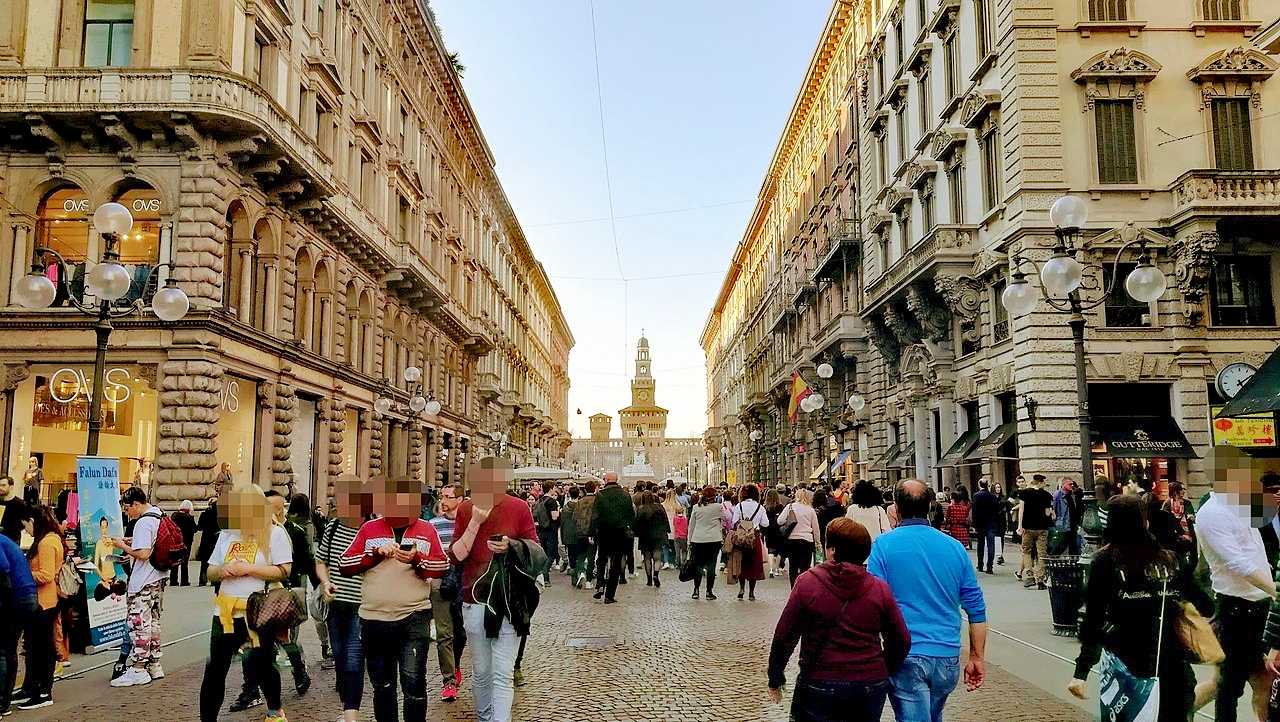
Via Dante, heading towards the Sforza Castle to the northwest

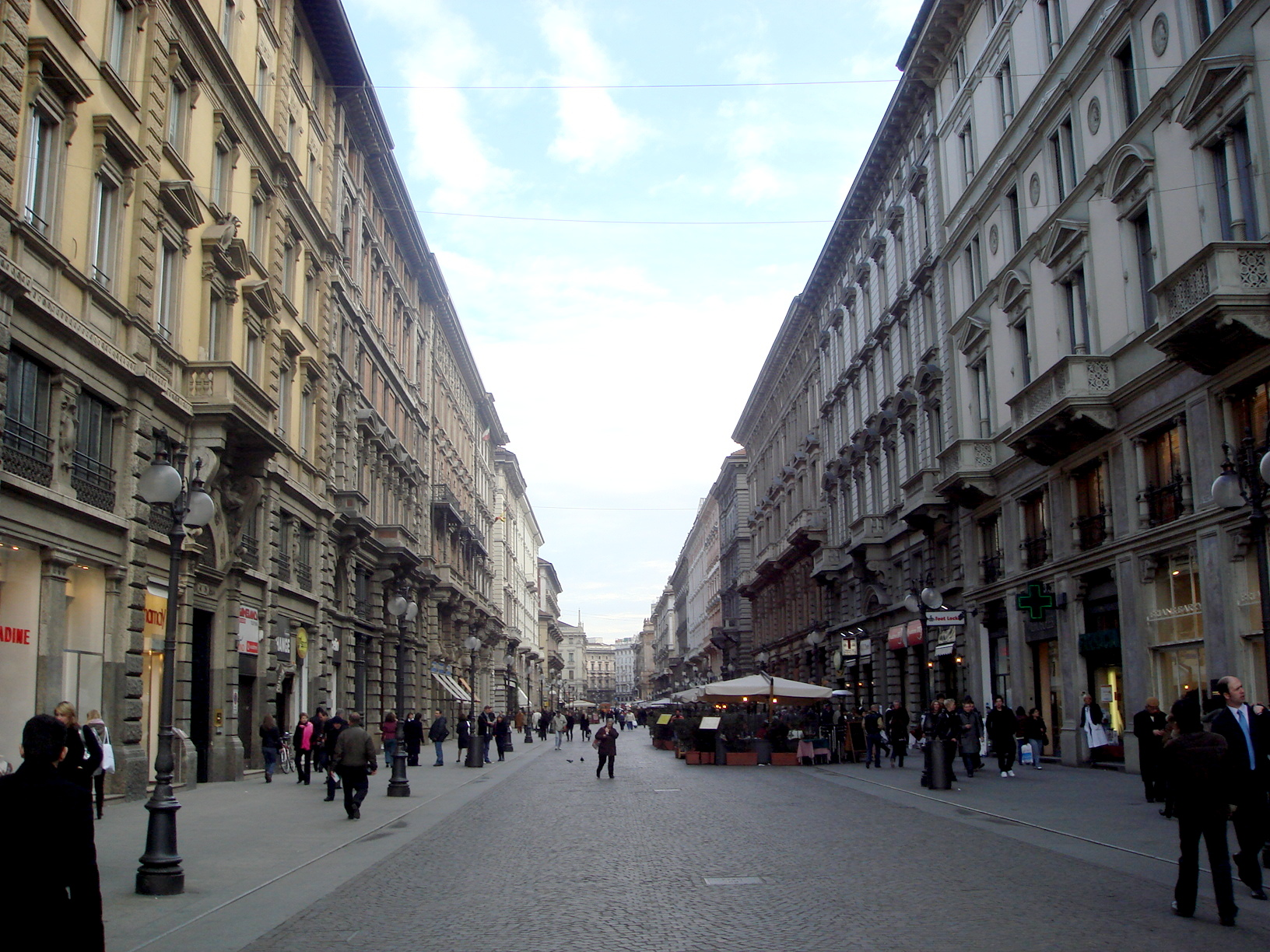
Via Dante, heading towards Piazza Cordusio to the southeast

Via Dante today is a pedestrianised street in central Milan, Italy, which leads to the Castello Sforzesco (Sforza Castle). It connects Piazzale Cordusio (near the town center and the Cordusio metro station) with Largo Cairoli (to the northwest and housing the Cairoli metro station). The Cairoli station is near to the Filarete tower and the entrance to the castle.

The street is named after the Florentine poet Dante Alighieri, is now known for its chic shops, restaurants, cafés, and bars. The street is flanked by multistory elegant palazzi (palaces), mainly built in the 18th and 19th centuries. Around Piazza Cordusio, are the palatial offices designed by Luigi Broggi of delle Assicurazioni Generali (1897–1901); del Credito Italiano (1901); and delle Poste (1901). At the north end of the Piazza is the Casa Broggi (1895), designed by Broggi and his pupil Sommaruga. On via Rovello 2, corner with via Dante is the 15th-century Palazzo Carmagnola, now housing the Piccolo Teatro (literally "small theatre").

Up until 1958, the street contained several transport links as well as a tramway line. In 1996 it was converted to a fully pedestrian area, the Milan Metro can be accessed through stations nearby.
