= Palazzo Carmagnola =

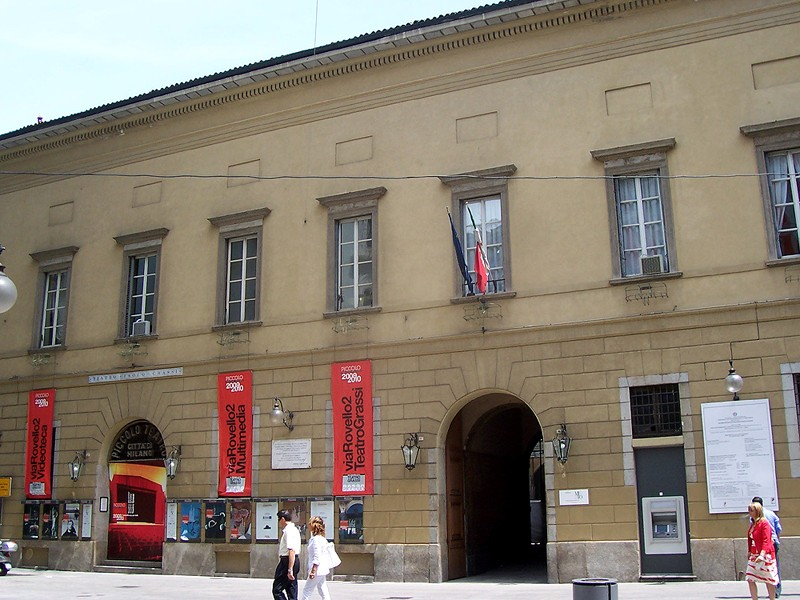
- Nineteenth-century front
- Interactive map of the Palazzo Carmagnola area
- Alternative names: Broletto Nuovissimo

General information
- Status: In use
- Type: Palace
- Architectural style: Renaissance architecture
- Location: Milan, Italy, 2, Via Rovello
- Coordinates: 45.466595°N 9.18504°E
- Current tenants: Piccolo Teatro di Milano
- Construction started: XVth century

Design and construction
- Architects: E.N. Rogers and Marco Zanuso (remodelled 1947)

Palazzo Carmagnola (formerly Broletto Nuovissimo from 1786 to 1861) is a 15th-century palace in Milan, Italy. It was remodelled several times in the following centuries. Historically belonging to hinges the Sestiere di Porta Comasina, it is located in via Rovello 2.

== History and description ==
The original palace was built in the early years of the 15th century by the Visconti, who used it as a second-rate residence, having at their disposal larger and more sumptuous ones. In fact, as early as 1415, it was donated by Filippo Maria Visconti, Duke of Milan, to Carmagnola, a famous condottiere of the time, who undertook its radical renovation between 1420 and 1425. On his death by beheading in Venice in 1432, the palace was inherited by his daughters; here in 1465 was held the ceremony with which Genoa lent total dedication to Francesco Sforza, in an anti Savoia key. Lodovico il Moro already claimed ownership of it in the last years of the 15th century: he obtained it by confiscation, forfeiting it as regalia, after the death of Pietro II Dal Verme, who in turn had received it as an inheritance from his mother Luchina Bussone, daughter of Carmagnola. In those years the palace underwent major renovation works, which saw its completion with fine colonnades very similar to those of the Monastery of Santa Maria del Lentasio and its transfer, in 1497, to the mistress of Duca Cecilia Gallerani. Under his supervision, both Bramante and Leonardo took part in the embellishment of the palace, to whom is also attributable the peculiar sundial designed in the ground of the second courtyard.

With the entry of the French into Milan, the palace passed into the hands of the latter; in 1505 it was sold by Carlo d'Amboise, French Governor of Milan, to Francesco Bebulco, master of the ordinary revenues. From 1605, it also served as the public granary. In 1714 some premises were readapted to house the offices of the Banco di Sant'Ambrogio; new works were started from 1770, to adapt the structure to house the Civic Archives, directed by the historian Giorgio Giulini. In 1773 the Tribunale di Provvisione was also transferred here from Piazza Mercanti. In 1786 it became the Broletto Novissimo, i.e. the municipal seat of the municipality of Milan, replacing the Broletto Nuovo.

In Napoleonic era it housed the Departmental Prefecture, when new renovations were undertaken. With the Unification of Italy, in 1861 there was a swap between the Municipality and the State, which saw an exchange between Palazzo Marino and Palazzo Carmagnola: the former now became the municipal seat, chosen both for a question of space and for a question of prestige and significance, the second came to house the offices of the Demanio, undergoing further remodelling and adaptation. Between 1890 and 1893, in conjunction with the construction of Via Dante, the body of the building overlooking Via Rovello was rebuilt, with the façade being rebuilt, taking particular care not to excessively alter the appearance of the main courtyard, which was in any case amputated. From 1910, the year of the demolition of the former Monastero del Bocchetto, it also housed the Stamp and Registry Office, previously located in the former religious structure.

Between 1927 and 1931, an agreement between the City and the State sanctioned the return of Palazzo Carmagnola to the property of the City of Milan. From 1937, new restoration work and adaptations were carried out on the structure, so that it could house the recreation rooms of the Municipality's employees' recreation centre. During that period, the basement of the building was also used as the headquarters of the fascist regime's counter-espionage services. Starting from 1943, the Legione Muti, commanded by Francesco Colombo, settled there instead (until 26 April 1945. In 1947 the building was adapted by Ernesto Nathan Rogers and Marco Zanuso to house the headquarters of the Piccolo Teatro di Milano, founded that same year by Paolo Grassi and Giorgio Strehler. Some municipal offices are still located on the upper floors, as they were then.

All that remains of the 15th-century building are the porticoes of one of the two courtyards, with their capitals sculpted in marble, while the six-arched porticoed courtyard is already the work of a reconstruction attributable to the early 16th century. During the last recent restoration, frescoes from the end of the 15th century were brought to light that can be attributed to the work of Bramante and Leonardo da Vinci.
