= Corso Buenos Aires =

Street in Milan, Italy

Coordinates: 45.4808°N 9.21139°E

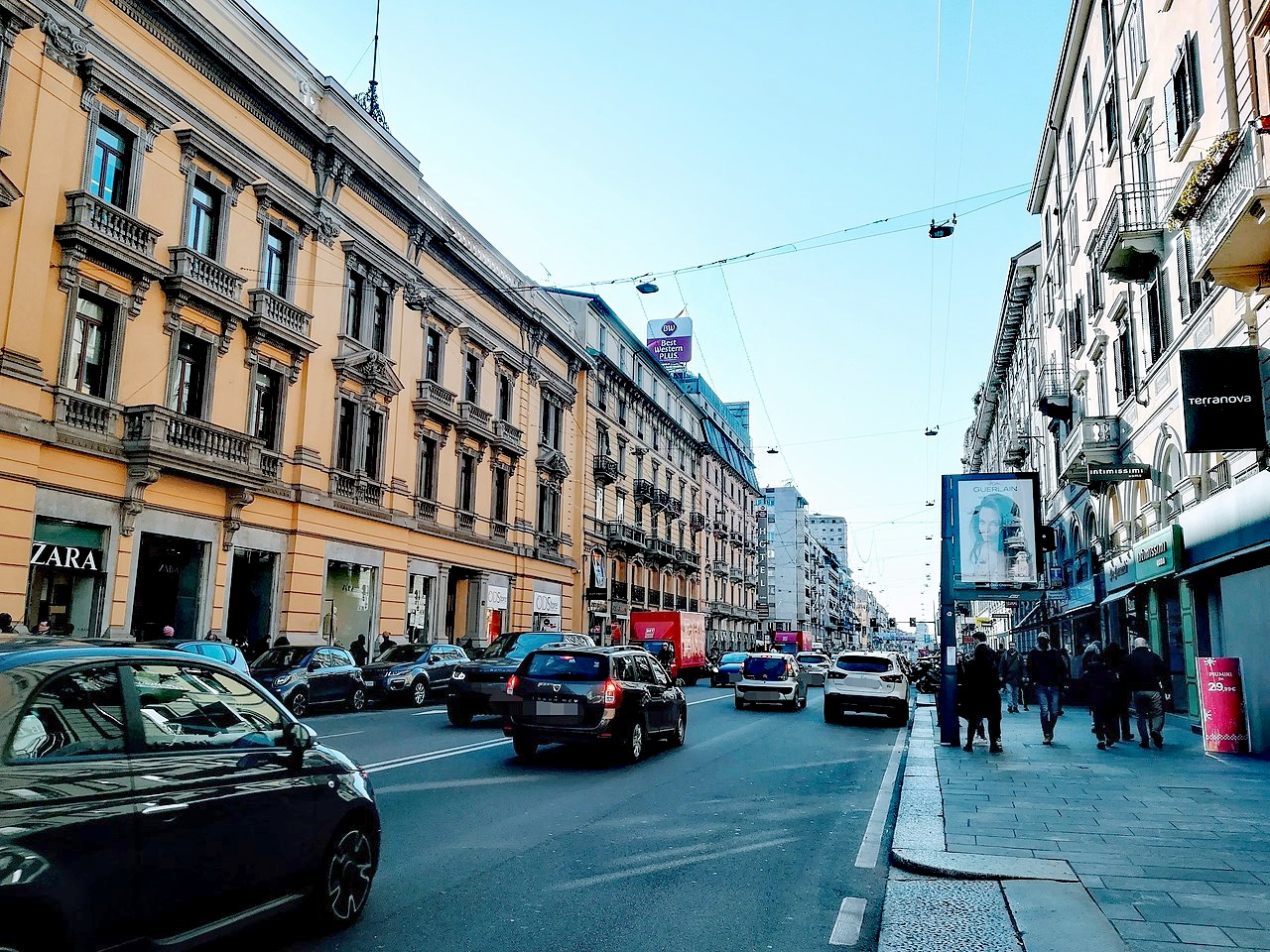
Corso Buenos Aires in Milan.

Corso Buenos Aires is a major street in north-eastern Milan, Italy. With over 350 shops and outlets, it features the highest concentration of clothing stores in Europe. The architecture of the area is mostly late 19th- and 20th-century style; the street and its surroundings are pointed with several neo-classical and Art Nouveau buildings.

== Location ==
Corso Buenos Aires is located in the north-eastern part of Milan, corresponding to the Zone 3 administrative division. It is about 1.2 km long, going roughly south-west to north-east, along the ideal line connecting Milan's centre at the Duomo to the nearby city of Monza. The street itself starts at Piazzale Oberdan, in the Porta Venezia neighbourhood, and ends in Piazzale Loreto. Going towards the city centre, the prosecution of Corso Buenos Aires is Corso Venezia, that reaches the very centre at Piazza San Babila, in the immediate surroundings of the Duomo. From the opposite end in Piazzale Loreto, three distinct streets depart, the main of which is Viale Monza, connecting Milan to Monza. The Milan Metro subway (Line 1) has three stops along Buenos Aires (in Porta Venezia, Piazza Lima, and Piazzale Loreto).

== Shopping ==
Due to the large number of shops, stores, and outlets, Corso Buenos Aires is one of the busiest streets of Milan; even more so during the Christmas holidays, when it sells most of the city's decorations. Unlike Via Montenapoleone and the surroundings of Piazza Duomo, that are specialized in high fashion and haute couture products, Corso Buenos Aires is generally more oriented towards mass products such as ready-to-wear type clothes.

== History ==
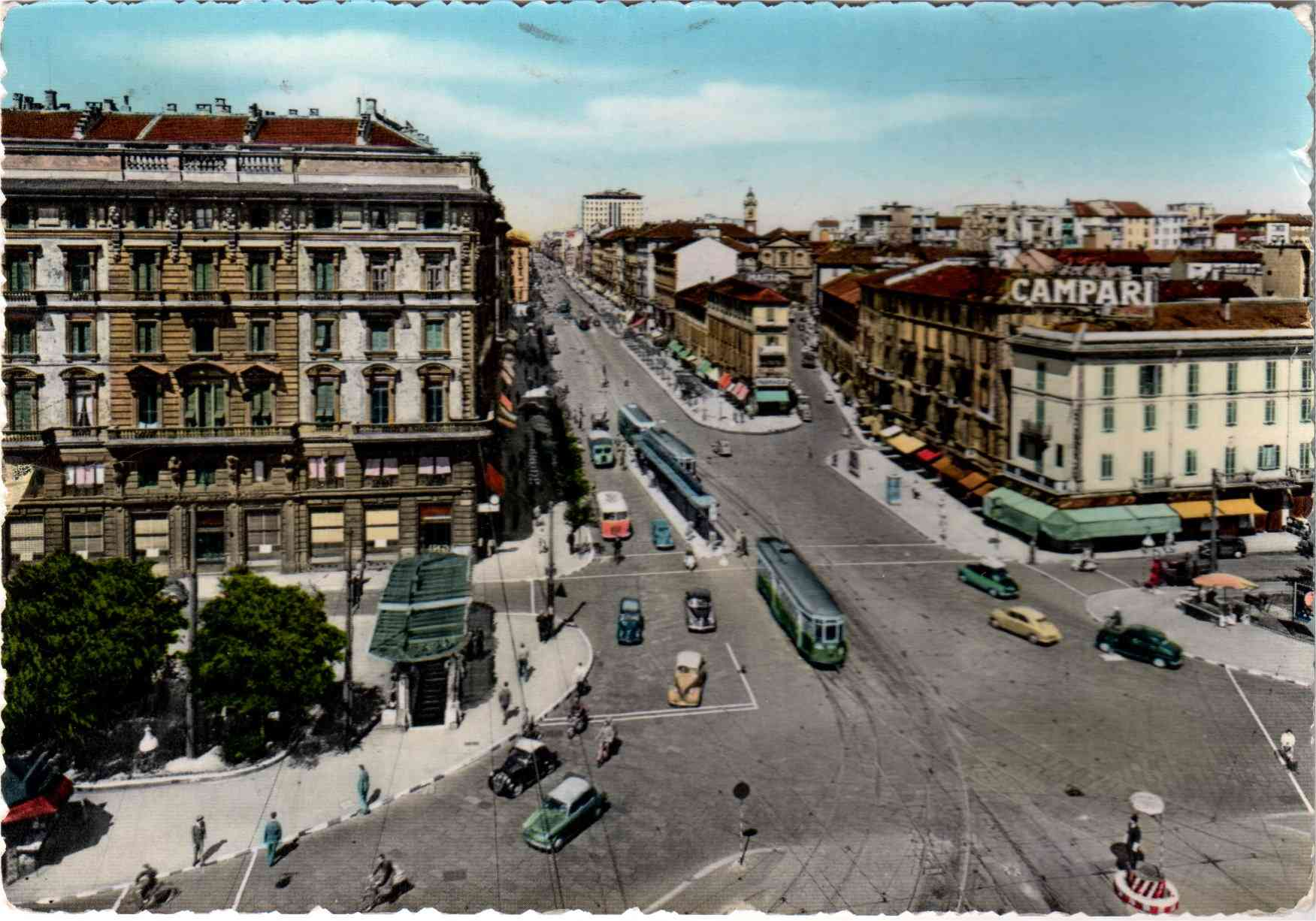
Beginning of Corso Buenos Aires from Piazza Oberdan, 1957

The modern Corso Buenos Aires developed from the "stradone di Loreto", an old road connecting the centre of Milan to Monza. In the 19th century, the road used to be called "Corso Loreto"; one of its prominent features was the Lazaretto, which is also mentioned in Alessandro Manzoni's novel The Betrothed; it was demolished in the late 19th century. Approximately in the same period, the horsecars that served this route were replaced by trams. In 1964 the trams themselves were abolished and the railway dismantled, being replaced by the modern subway line.

Corso Buenos Aires used to be known for the numerous small shops selling traditional Milanese products; however, these have been mostly replaced by modern fashion outlets. Likewise, some of the ancient buildings were replaced by modern, high-rise blocks of flats.

== See also ==
- Buenos Aires, Argentina
- Barbapedana, a cantastorie (minstrel) that used to play in the inns of Corso Buenos Aires and Piazzale Loreto in the late 19th century
- Trams in Milan
