= Sesto Rondò (Milan Metro) =

Milan metro station

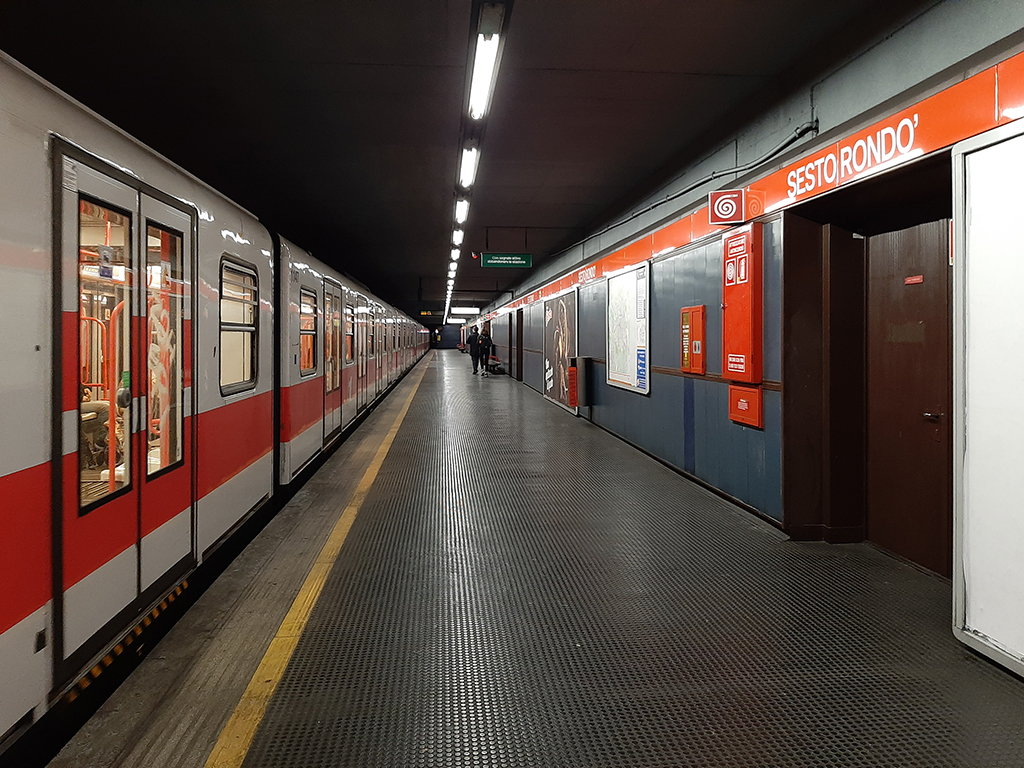

General information
- Location: Piazza 4 Novembre, Sesto San Giovanni
- Coordinates: 45°32′03″N 9°13′53″E
- Owner: Azienda Trasporti Milanesi
- Platforms: 2
- Tracks: 2

Construction
- Structure type: Underground

Other information
- Fare zone: STIBM: Mi3

History
- Opened: 28 September 1986; 39 years ago

Services
| Preceding station | Milan Metro | Following station |
|---|---|---|
| Sesto Marelli towards Rho Fiera or Bisceglie | Line 1 | Sesto 1º Maggio Terminus |
Location
- Location within Milan Location within Lombardy Location within Northern Italy Location within Italy

Sesto Rondò is a station on Line 1 of the Milan Metro. The station was opened on 28 September 1986 as part of the extension from Sesto Marelli to Sesto 1º Maggio.

The station is located in the municipality of Sesto San Giovanni, in the metropolitan territory of Milan.

This is an underground station with two tracks in a single tunnel.
