= Milan Metro Line 1 =

Subway line serving Milan, Italy

M1

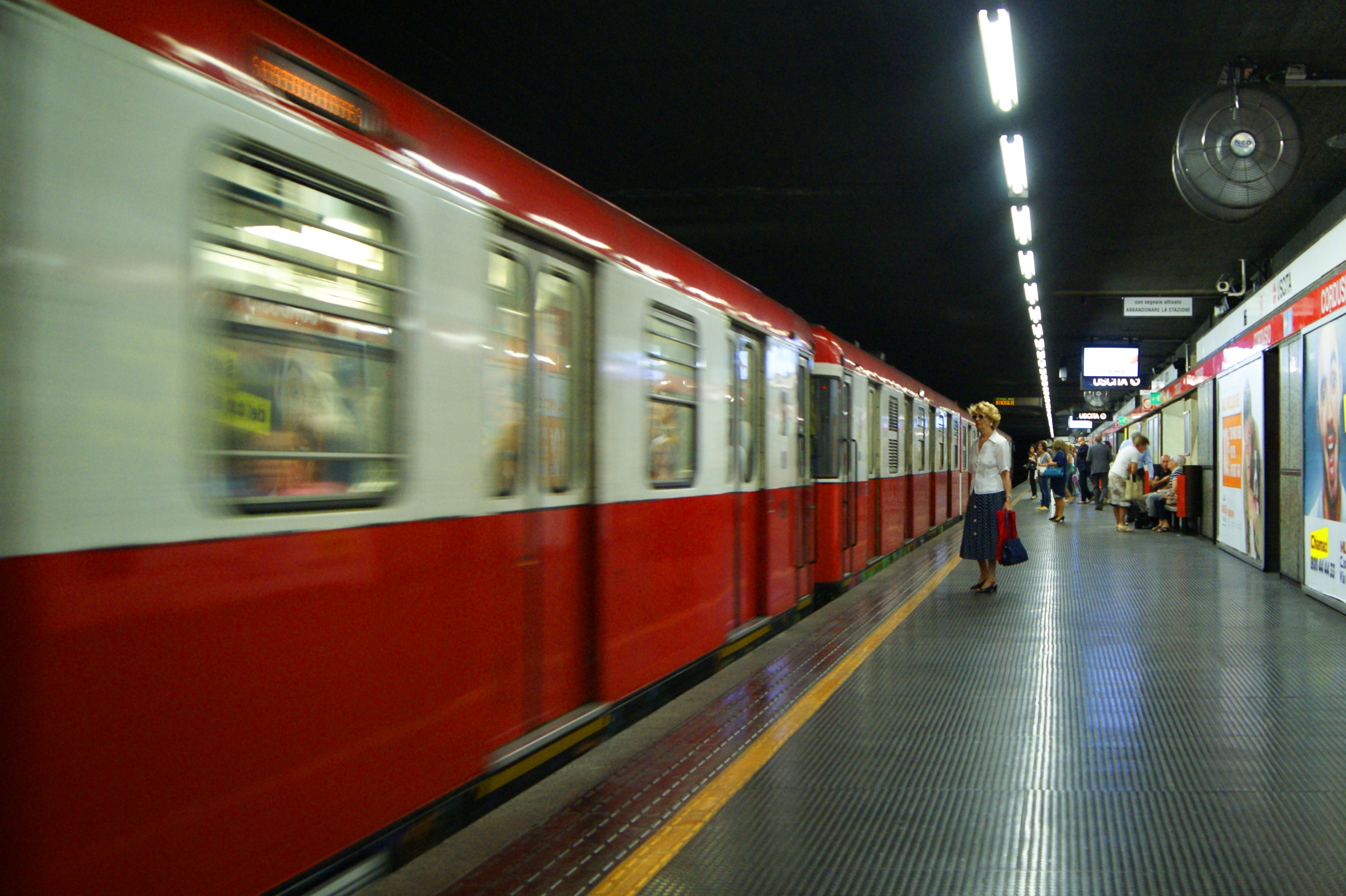
- Cordusio station

Overview
- Status: operational
- Locale: Milan, Italy
- Termini: Sesto 1º Maggio; Rho Fiera / Bisceglie
- Stations: 38

Service
- Type: Rapid transit
- System: Milan Metro
- Operator: Azienda Trasporti Milanesi
- Depot(s): Gallaratese, Precotto
- Rolling stock: 63 trains: UdT (various series); AnsaldoBreda Meneghino; AnsaldoBreda Leonardo
- Daily ridership: 500,000

History
- Opened: 1 November 1964; 61 years ago
- Last extension: 2005

Technical
- Line length: 27 km (17 mi)
- Track gauge: 1,435 mm (4 ft 8 1/2 in) standard gauge
- Electrification: Fourth rail, 750 V DC
Route map

Line 1 is the first underground rapid transit line built in Milan, Italy. It is part of the Milan Metro and it is operated by ATM. Works on the line began in 1957, and the first part was opened on 1 November 1964, running from Sesto Marelli to Lotto station. The line is also called Red Line (Linea Rossa in Italian), as it is visually identified by red signs. Due to its premiership, the line gave its red color to the Milan Metro logo.

== Route ==
The line runs underground from the northern suburb of Sesto San Giovanni to the city centre, then to the western district with two different branches, one northwest to Rho, the other to the west to Bisceglie. It is 27 km (17 mi) long and serves 38 underground stations.

Key points served by the line are Duomo, considered the center of Milan; Castello Sforzesco (with Cairoli station); Cadorna, one of the busiest stations in Milan and in Italy; Corso Buenos Aires (with stations Porta Venezia, Lima and Loreto), an important shopping street; and Rho Fiera, one of the largest fairgrounds in the world.

| Station Name | Transfer | Branch | Opening |
|---|---|---|---|
| Sesto I Maggio | Line S7 (Milan suburban railway service) Line S8 (Milan suburban railway service) Line S9 (Milan suburban railway service) Line S11 (Milan suburban railway service) | Main route | 28 September 1986 |
| Sesto Rondò | | Main route | 28 September 1986 |
| Sesto Marelli | | Main route | 1 November 1964 |
| Villa San Giovanni | | Main route | 1 November 1964 |
| Precotto | | Main route | 1 November 1964 |
| Gorla | | Main route | 1 November 1964 |
| Turro | | Main route | 1 November 1964 |
| Rovereto | | Main route | 1 November 1964 |
| Pasteur | | Main route | 1 November 1964 |
| Loreto | Milan Metro Line 2 | Main route | 1 November 1964 |
| Lima | | Main route | 1 November 1964 |
| Porta Venezia | Line S1 (Milan suburban railway service) Line S2 (Milan suburban railway service) Line S5 (Milan suburban railway service) Line S6 (Milan suburban railway service) Line S12 (Milan suburban railway service) Line S13 (Milan suburban railway service) | Main route | 1 November 1964 |
| Palestro | | Main route | 1 November 1964 |
| San Babila | Milan Metro Line 4 | Main route | 1 November 1964 |
| Duomo | Milan Metro Line 3 | Main route | 1 November 1964 |
| Cordusio | | Main route | 1 November 1964 |
| Cairoli | | Main route | 1 November 1964 |
| Cadorna | Milan Metro Line 2 Line S3 (Milan suburban railway service) Line S4 (Milan suburban railway service) | Main route | 1 November 1964 |
| Conciliazione | | Main route | 1 November 1964 |
| Pagano | | Main route | 1 November 1964 |
| Buonarroti | | Rho Fieramilano branch | 1 November 1964 |
| Amendola | | Rho Fieramilano branch | 1 November 1964 |
| Lotto | Milan Metro Line 5 | Rho Fieramilano branch | 1 November 1964 |
| QT8 | | Rho Fieramilano branch | 8 November 1975 |
| Lampugnano | | Rho Fieramilano branch | 12 April 1980 |
| Uruguay | | Rho Fieramilano branch | 12 April 1980 |
| Bonola | | Rho Fieramilano branch | 12 April 1980 |
| San Leonardo | | Rho Fieramilano branch | 12 April 1980 |
| Molino Dorino | | Rho Fieramilano branch | 28 September 1986 |
| Pero | | Rho Fieramilano branch | 19 December 2005 |
| Rho Fieramilano | Line S5 (Milan suburban railway service) Line S6 (Milan suburban railway service) Line S11 (Milan suburban railway service) | Rho Fieramilano branch | 19 December 2005 |
| Wagner | | Bisceglie branch | 2 April 1966 |
| De Angeli | | Bisceglie branch | 2 April 1966 |
| Gambara | | Bisceglie branch | 2 April 1966 |
| Bande Nere | | Bisceglie branch | 18 April 1975 |
| Primaticcio | | Bisceglie branch | 18 April 1975 |
| Inganni | | Bisceglie branch | 18 April 1975 |
| Bisceglie | | Bisceglie branch | 21 March 1992 |

== History ==
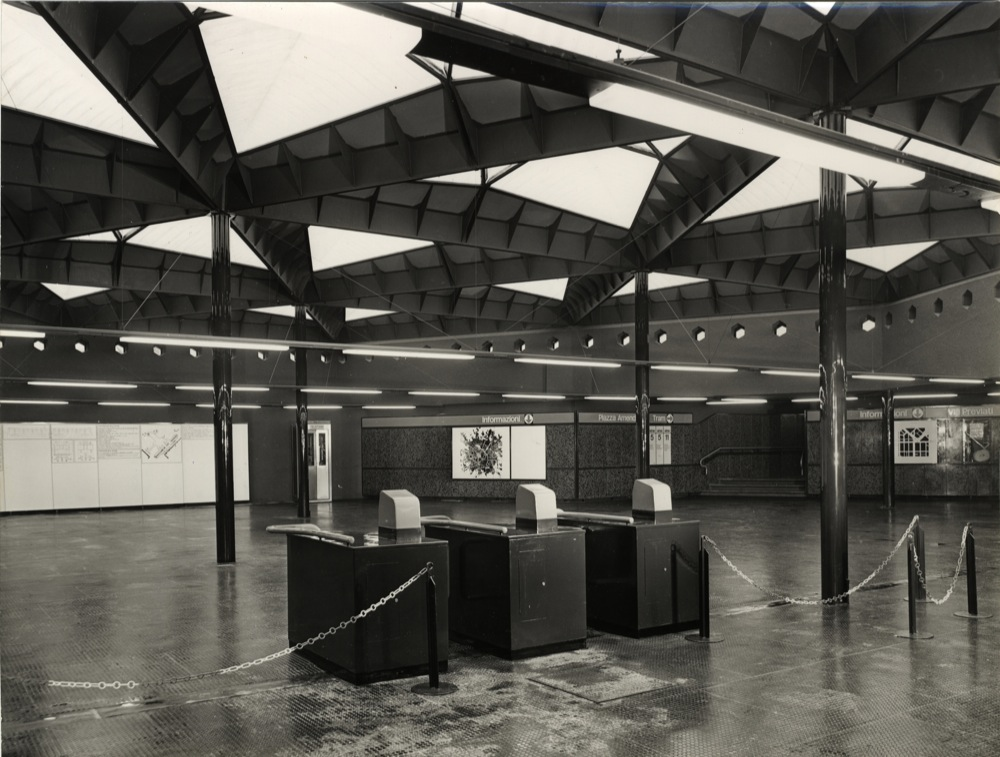
The mezzanine floor of the Amendola station just before opening in 1964.

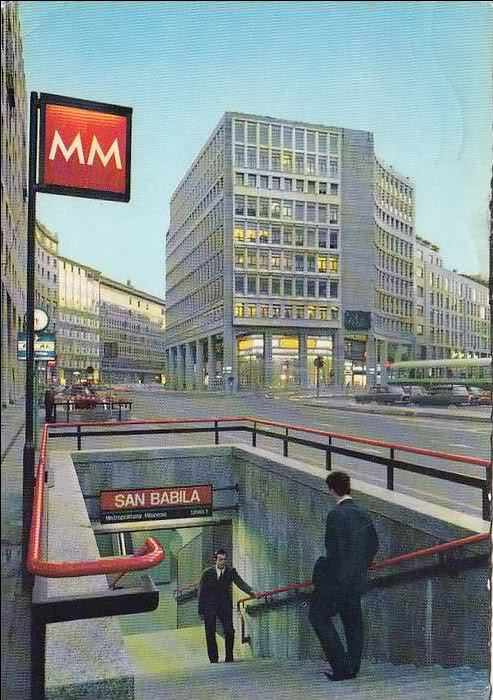
The San Babila station's poster during the 1960s.

On 6 April 1952 the city administration asked for a project of a metro system and on 6 October 1955 a new company, Metropolitana Milanese, was created to manage the construction of the new infrastructure. The project was funded with ₤ 500 million from the municipality and the rest from a loan. The construction site of the first line was opened in viale Monte Rosa on 4 May 1957. Stations on the new line were designed by Franco Albini-Franca Helg architecture studio. Bob Noorda designed the famous wayfinding and signage system.

At first, stations were designed without the mezzanine floor. However, these were added to the final design to allow street crossing and the use of gates to collect tickets.

The line from Lotto to Sesto Marelli (21 stations) opened on 1 November 1964, after seven years of construction works.

== Rolling stock ==
There are 3 types of trains running on the line: revamped original trains, the "Meneghino" trains, and the "Leonardo" trains.

The original first series trains were phased out between 2014 and 2015. The track gauge is the 1,435 mm (4 ft 8 1/2 in) standard gauge. The entire line is electrified by means of a third or fourth rail at 750 V DC.

Among the 63 trains running on the line, 20 entered service between 1964 (opening of the line) and 1970. Those trains were replaced by the "Meneghino" trains, and more were replaced by the "Leonardo" trains. Subsequently, the original first series trains were retired and dismantled. These new trains fully replaced the older, non-upgraded series still operating on Line 1.

On November 17, 2024, the first of 21 "Galileo" trains produced by Hitachi Rail at the Reggio Calabria plant was delivered for Line 1. These trains are set to completely replace the refurbished original sets. Their entry into service is scheduled for 2025.

== Extension ==
An extension towards the north from Sesto Primo Maggio to Monza Bettola is currently under construction. It is expected to be completed by 2023. The new section will be 1.9 km (1.2 mi) long with 2 stations (Sesto Restellone and Monza Bettola), entirely underground. The total cost will be €206 million.

| Station Name | Transfer | Grade |
|---|---|---|
| Sesto Restellone | | Underground |
| Monza Bettola | Milan Metro Line 5 | Underground |

An extension of the western branch from Bisceglie towards the city limits has been approved in 2019. The new stations will be located at Baggio, via Valsesia and at Quartiere Olmi. The national government will provide €210 million, while the total cost is estimated at €350 million. The public construction contract for a total of €362 million was awarded in June 2025. The construction work is planned to last 6 years 3 months.

| Station Name | Transfer | Grade |
|---|---|---|
| Parri-Valsesia | | Underground |
| Baggio | | Underground |
| Olmi | | Underground |

== Gallery ==
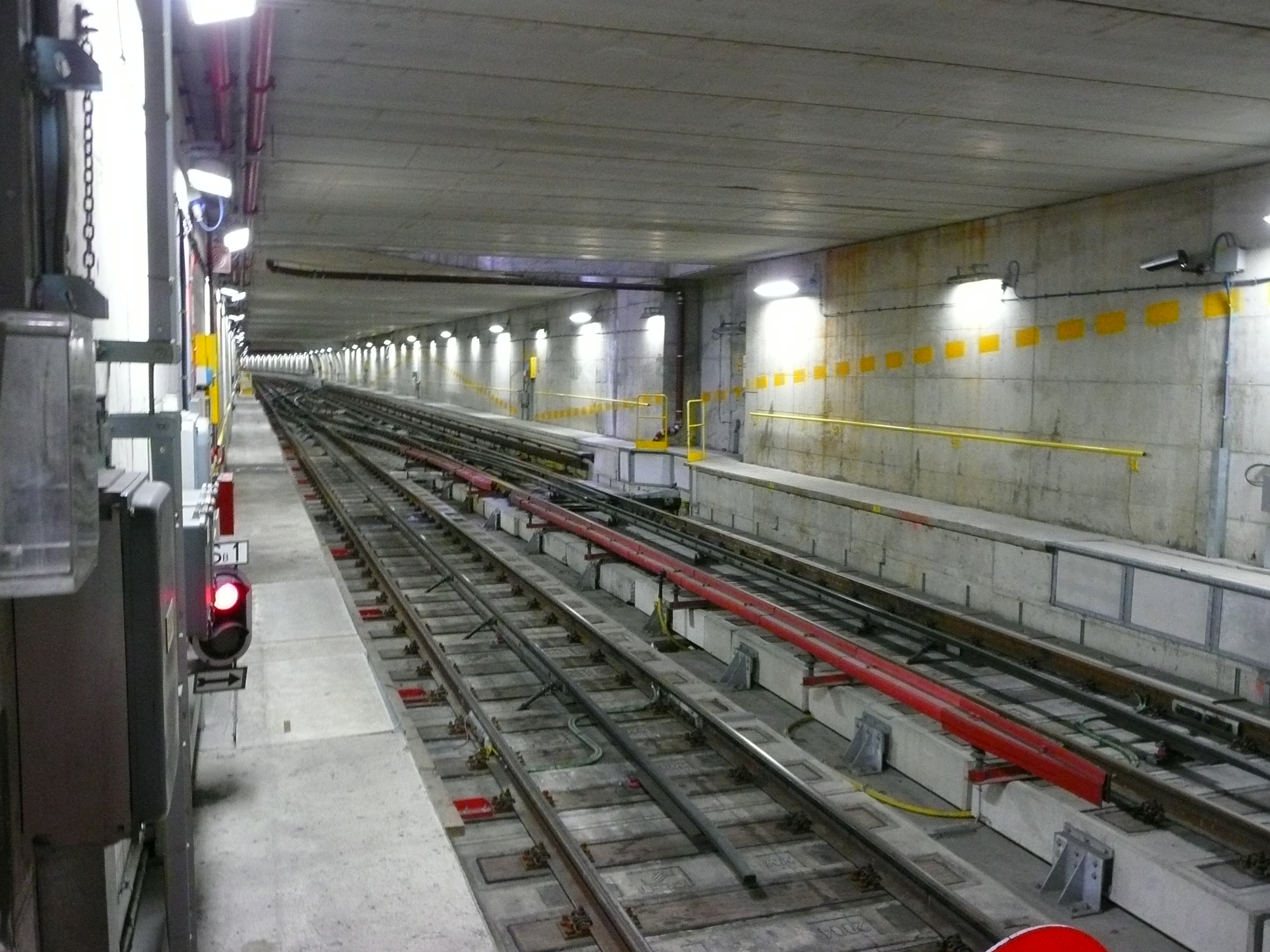
A M1 tunnel showing the electrical feeding system

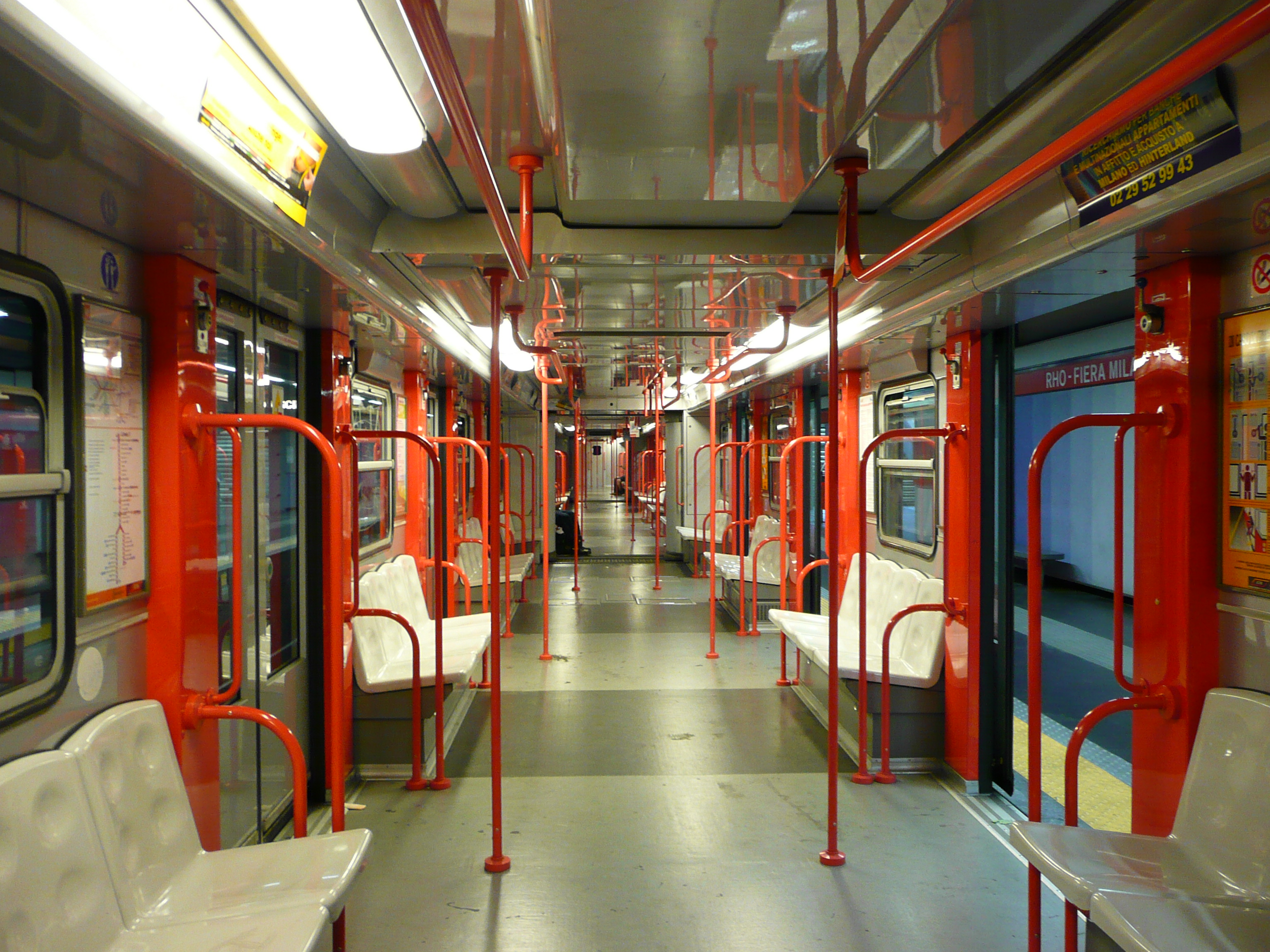
Inside a fully revamped train

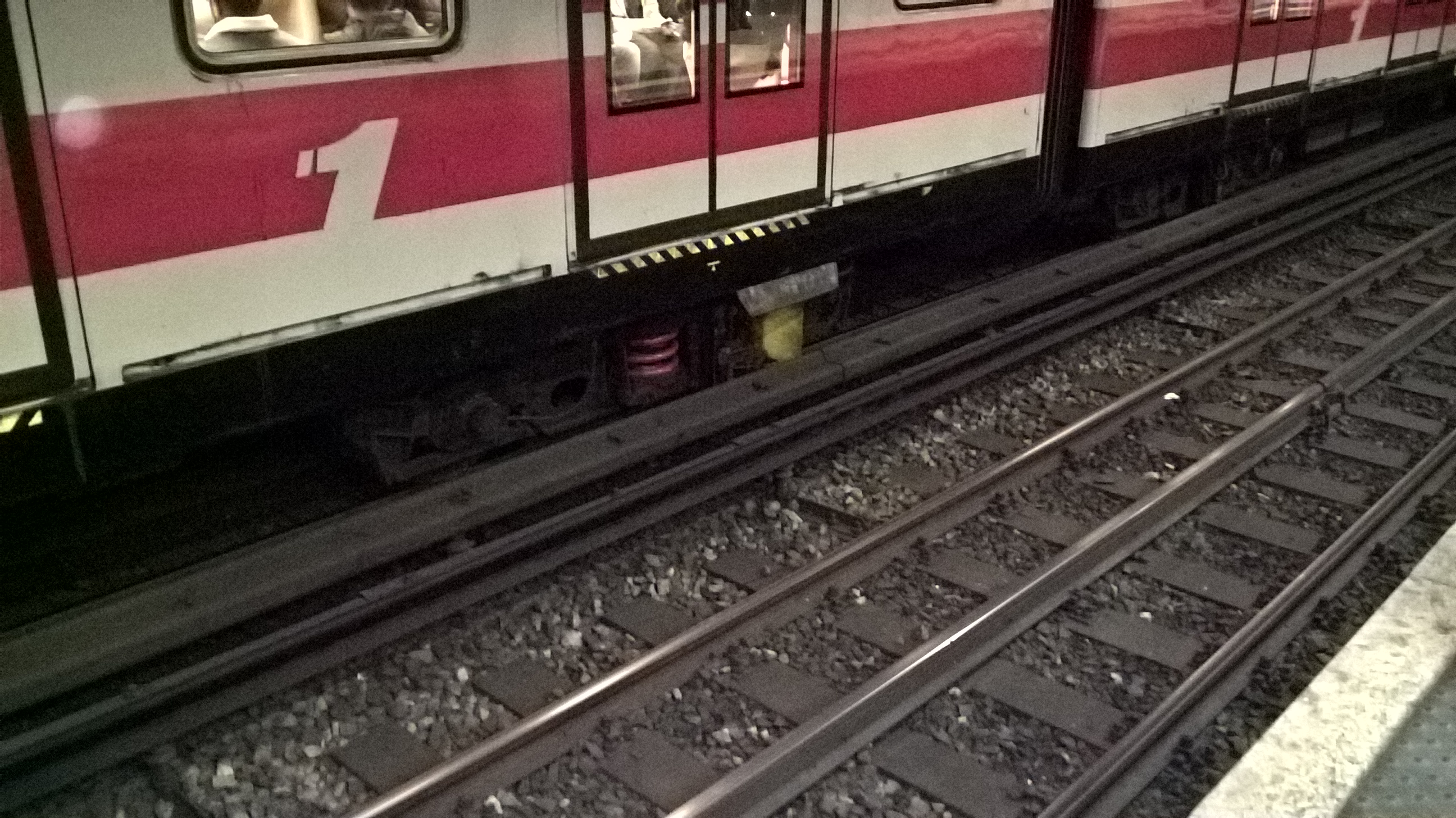
A train on Milan Metro's Line 1 showing the fourth-rail contact shoe.
