= Lotto (Milan Metro) =

Milan metro station

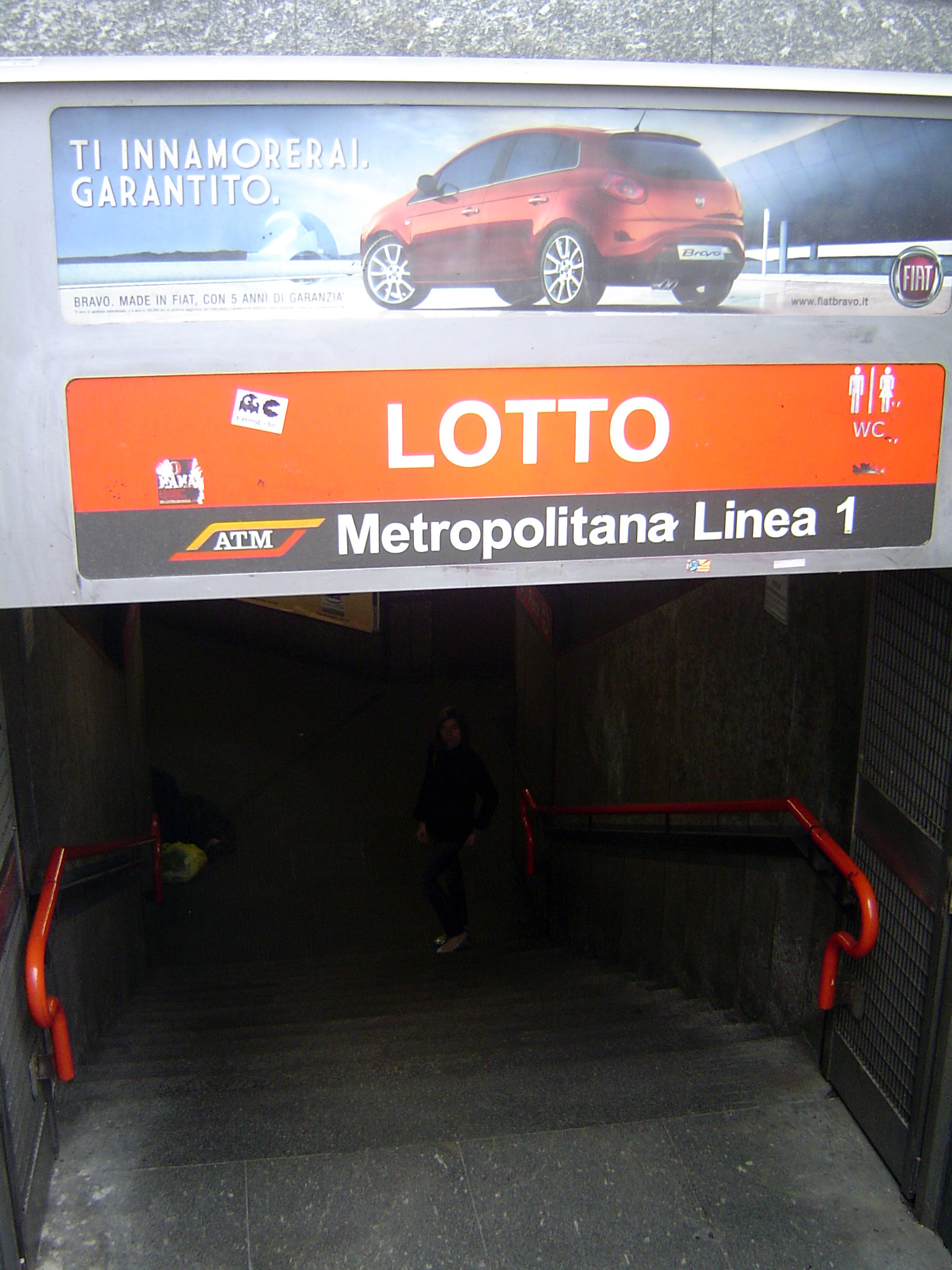

General information
- Location: Piazzale Lorenzo Lotto, Milan
- Coordinates: 45°28′46″N 9°08′36″E
- Owner: Azienda Trasporti Milanesi
- Platforms: 2 (line 1); 1 (line 5)
- Tracks: 2 (line 1); 2 (line 5)

Construction
- Structure type: Underground
- Accessible: yes

Other information
- Fare zone: STIBM: Mi1

History
- Opened: 1 November 1964; 61 years ago
- Closed: 5 June 2027; 9 months' time

Services
Preceding station	Milan Metro	Following station
QT8 towards Rho Fiera	Line 1	Amendola towards Sesto 1º Maggio
Portello towards Bignami	Line 5	Segesta towards San Siro Stadio
Location
- Location within Milan Location within Lombardy Location within Northern Italy Location within Italy

Lotto is a station on Lines 1 and 5 of the Milan Metro in Milan, Italy. The underground station was opened on 1 November 1964 as the northwestern terminus of the inaugural section of the Metro, between Sesto Marelli and Lotto. On 8 November 1975, the line was extended by one station to QT8. Since 2015, it has also been served by Line 5. It is located on Piazzale Lorenzo Lotto.
