= Sesto 1º Maggio (Milan Metro) =

Milan metro station

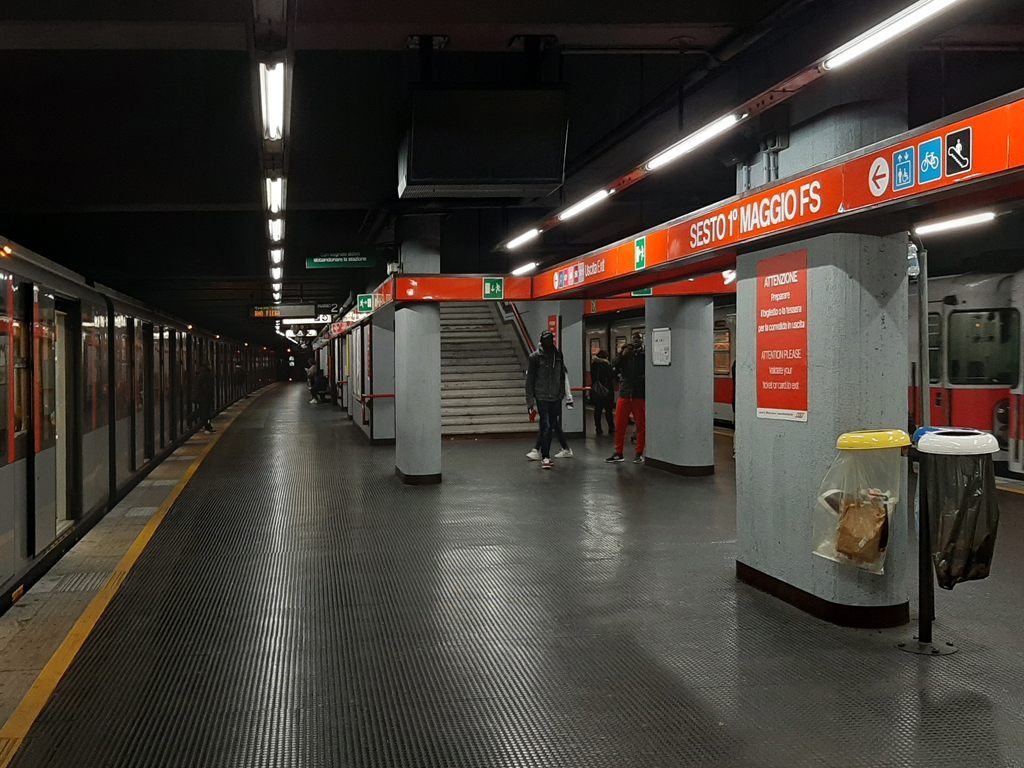

General information
- Location: Piazza Primo Maggio, Sesto San Giovanni
- Coordinates: 45°32′29.5″N 9°14′19″E
- System: underground station
- Owner: Azienda Trasporti Milanesi
- Platforms: 2
- Tracks: 3
- Connections: Sesto San Giovanni railway station

Construction
- Structure type: Underground
- Accessible: y

Other information
- Fare zone: STIBM: Mi3

History
- Opened: 28 September 1986; 39 years ago

Services
Preceding station	Milan Metro	Following station
Sesto Rondò towards Rho Fiera or Bisceglie	Line 1	Terminus
Location
- Location within Milan Location within Lombardy Location within Northern Italy Location within Italy

Sesto Primo Maggio is a station on Line 1 of the Milan Metro. The station was opened on 28 September 1986 as part of the extension from Sesto Marelli to Sesto 1º Maggio. It is the northeastern terminus of the line.

The station is located in Piazza Primo Maggio in the municipality of Sesto San Giovanni, in the metropolitan territory of Milan. The underground station is located under the Sesto San Giovanni railway station of Ferrovie dello Stato.

The station is underground with three tracks in two separate tunnels.

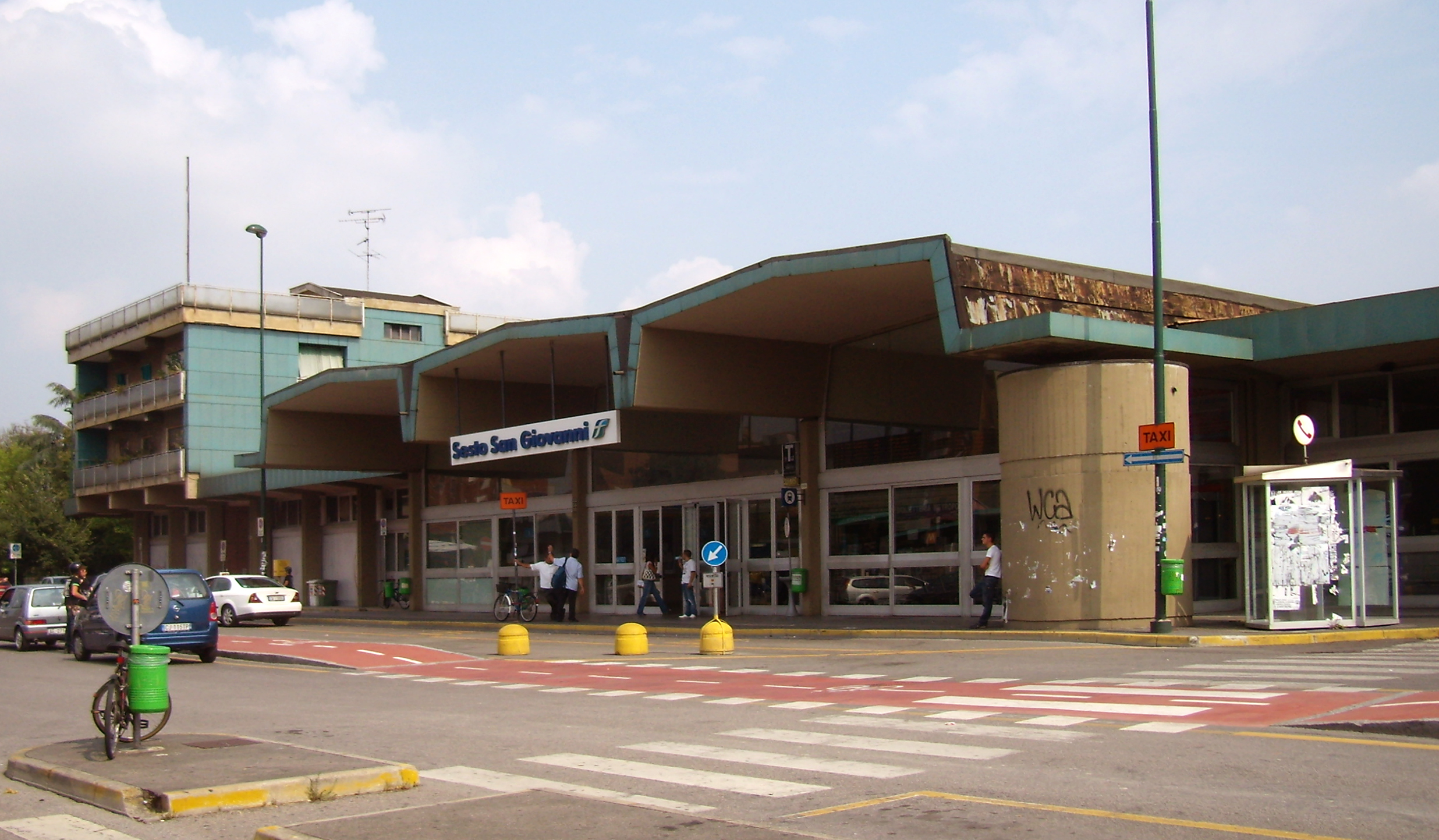
The adjoining Sesto San Giovanni railway station
