= Zone 8 of Milan =

Coordinates: 45.515925°N 9.140196°E

Zone 8 of Milan Municipality 8
- Municipality of Milan
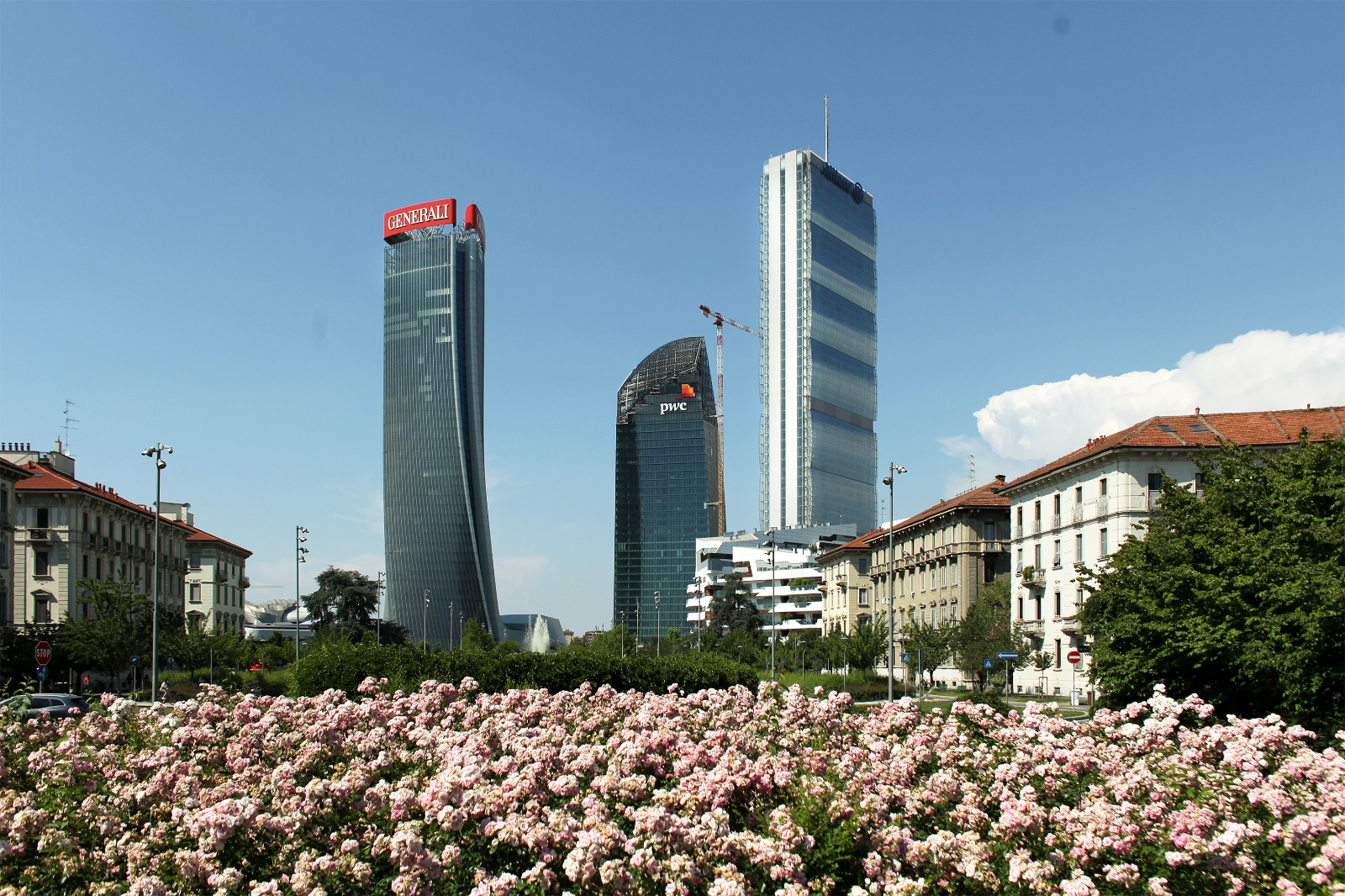
- CityLife

- Location of Zone 8 of Milan
- Country: Italy
- Region: Lombardy
- Province: Metro City of Milan
- Comune: Milan

Government
  - President: Giulia Pelucchi (PD)

Area
  - Total: 9.16 sq mi (23.72 km^{2})

Population (2022)
  - Total: 190,059
- Time zone: UTC+1 (CET)
  - Summer (DST): UTC+2 (CEST)

The Zone 8 of Milan, since 2016 officially Municipality 8 of Milan, (in Italian: Zona 8 di Milano, Municipio 8 di Milano) is one of the 9 administrative divisions of Milan, Italy.

It was officially created as an administrative subdivision during the 1980s. On 14 April 2016, in order to promote a reform on the municipal administrative decentralization, the City Council of Milan established the new Municipality 8, a new administrative body responsible for running most local services, such as schools, social services, waste collection, roads, parks, libraries and local commerce.

The zone lies on the north-western part of the city.

== Subdivision ==
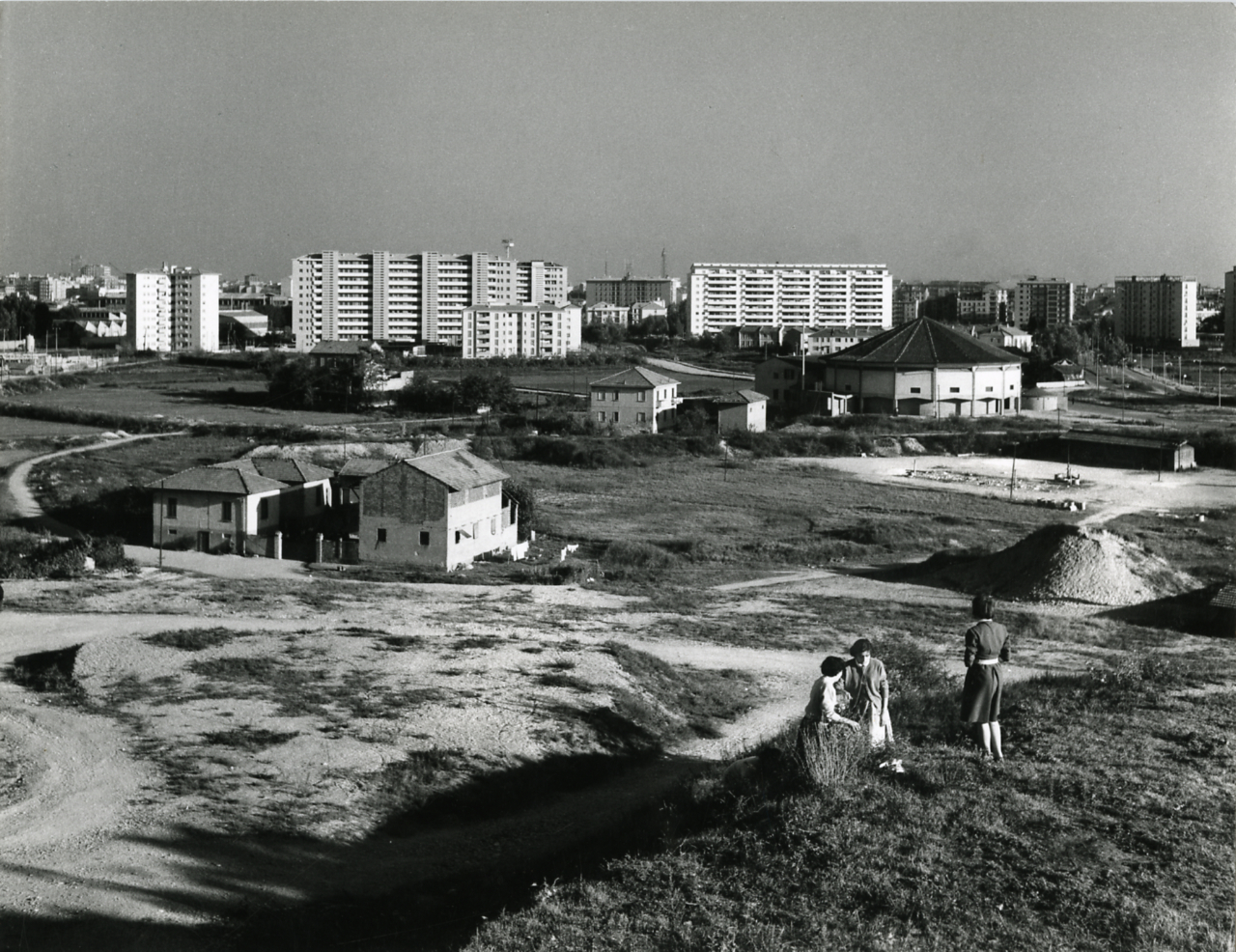
QT8 area as it was in 1960.

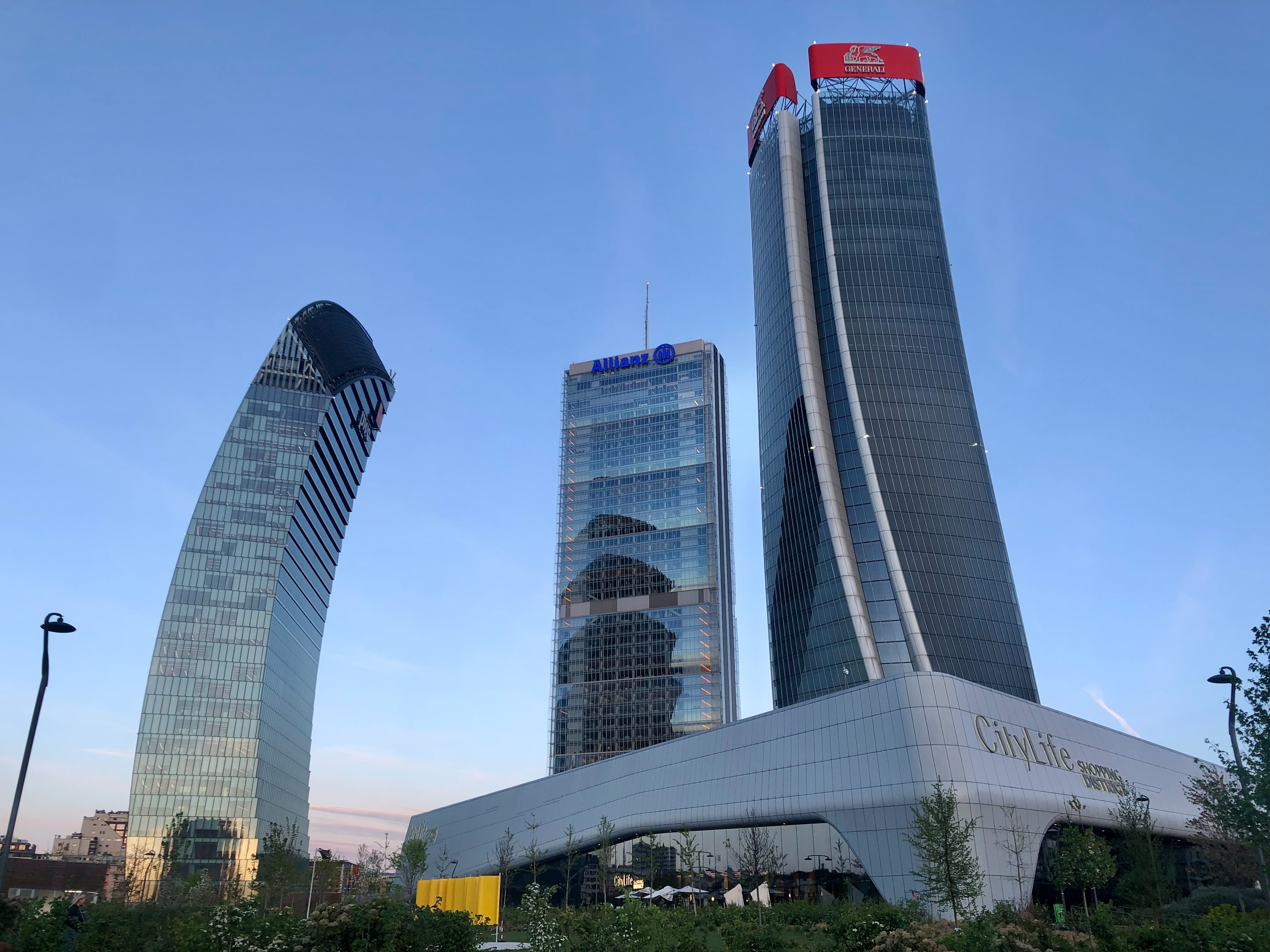
CityLife in 2023.

The zone includes the following districts:

- Porta Volta, named after the gate built in 1860 to connect the city to the Monumental Cemetery;
- Fiera, now CityLife, residential, commercial and business district built between 2007 and 2025 on the site of the old Trade Fair opened in 1920;
- Gallaratese, one of the largest districts in Italy to have been built "from scratch" in the 20th century (between the 1960s and 1980s) in a previously rural area. Today, the district has a population of about 60,000. A major landmark of the Gallaratese district is Monte Amiata, a complex of apartment blocks that were designed by Carlo Aymonino, and that are characterized by a futuristic architecture. The most typical buildings are the so-called "tower houses" (case torri in Italian, tower-shaped apartment blocks;
- Quarto Oggiaro, one of the largest social housing estates in Milan;
- Lampugnano, autonomous comune until 1841 when it was annexed to the city;
- Musocco, autonomous comune until 1923 when it was annexed to the city. Since 1895 it has been housing the Greater Cemetery of Milan;
- Campo dei Fiori, a residential neighborhood built in 1919 by the 'Social Housing Institute' (IACP) in response to the housing needs of Milan's growing population;
- Cascina Merlata, a residential, commercial and business district currently under construction near Expo 2015's site;
- Portello, whose name of the district comes from the "Strada del Portello" (Portello road), an ancient rural road that used to connect Milan to Rho, and that was later replaced by the new Strada del Sempione ("Simplon Road") leading to the Simplon Pass. Best known as a car-manufacturing area, today is considered one of the major urban redevelopment in the city;
- QT8, which developed from an experimental urbanization project that was conceived during the 8th edition of the Triennale design exhibition held in 1947, at the beginning of the reconstruction of Milan after World War II. The project included the realization of Monte Stella, an artificial hill made from the debris of the buildings that had collapsed during the war;
- Roserio, developed from an ancient rural settlement which was annexed to Musocco in 1861;
- Trenno, autonomous comune until 1923 when it was annexed to the city. The district is mostly residential, with low and medium-income apartment blocks;
- Varesina, a highly urbanized and former industrial district;
- Vialba, autonomous comune until 1841 when it was annexed to the city;
- Villapizzone, autonomous comune until 1869 when it was annexed to the city.

== Government ==
The area has its own local authority called Consiglio di Municipio (Municipal Council), composed by the President and 30 members directly elected by citizens every five years. The Council is responsible for most local services, such as schools, social services, waste collection, roads, parks, libraries and local commerce in the area, and manages funds (if any) provided by the city government for specific purposes, such as those intended to guarantee the right to education for poorer families.

The President is Giulia Pelucchi (PD), elected on 3–4 October 2021.

Here is the current composition of the Municipal Council after 2021 municipal election:

Alliance or political party	Members		Composition
Alliance or political party	2021–2026		Composition
Centre-left (PD-EV)	18	18 / 30	
Centre-right (FI-L-FdI)	12	12 / 30	

Here is a full lists of the directly-elected Presidents of Municipio since 2011:

President	Term of office		Party
Simone Zambelli	16 May 2011	8 October 2021	SEL
Giulia Pelucchi	8 October 2021	Incumbent	PD

== Transport ==
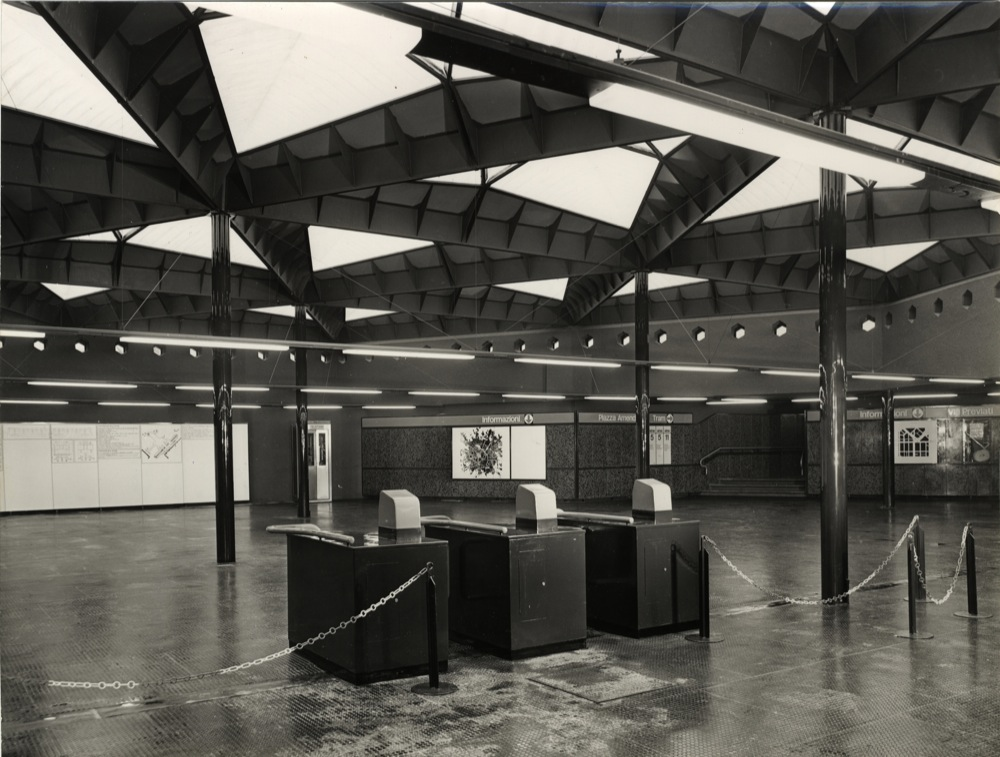
Amendola station just before the opening in 1964.

Stations of Milan Metro in the Zone 8:

- Amendola, Bonola, Buonarroti, Lampugnano, Lotto, Molino Dorino, Pagano, QT8, San Leonardo, Uruguay;
- Cenisio, Domodossola FN, Gerusalemme, Lotto, Monumentale, Portello, Tre Torri.

Suburban railway stations in the Zone 8:

- Milano Domodossola
- Milano Quarto Oggiaro
- Milano Certosa
- Milano Villapizzone

== Gallery ==
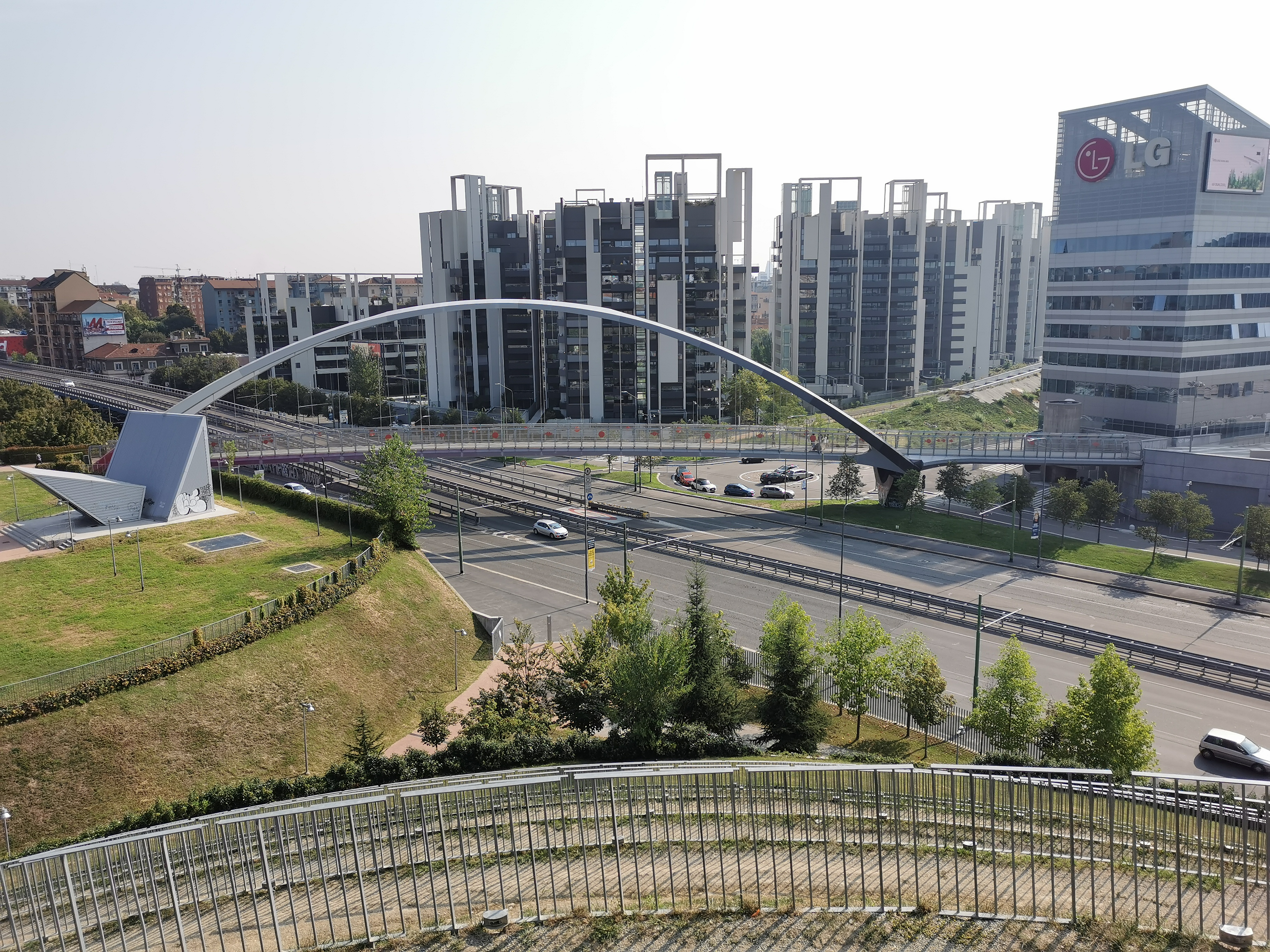
Portello

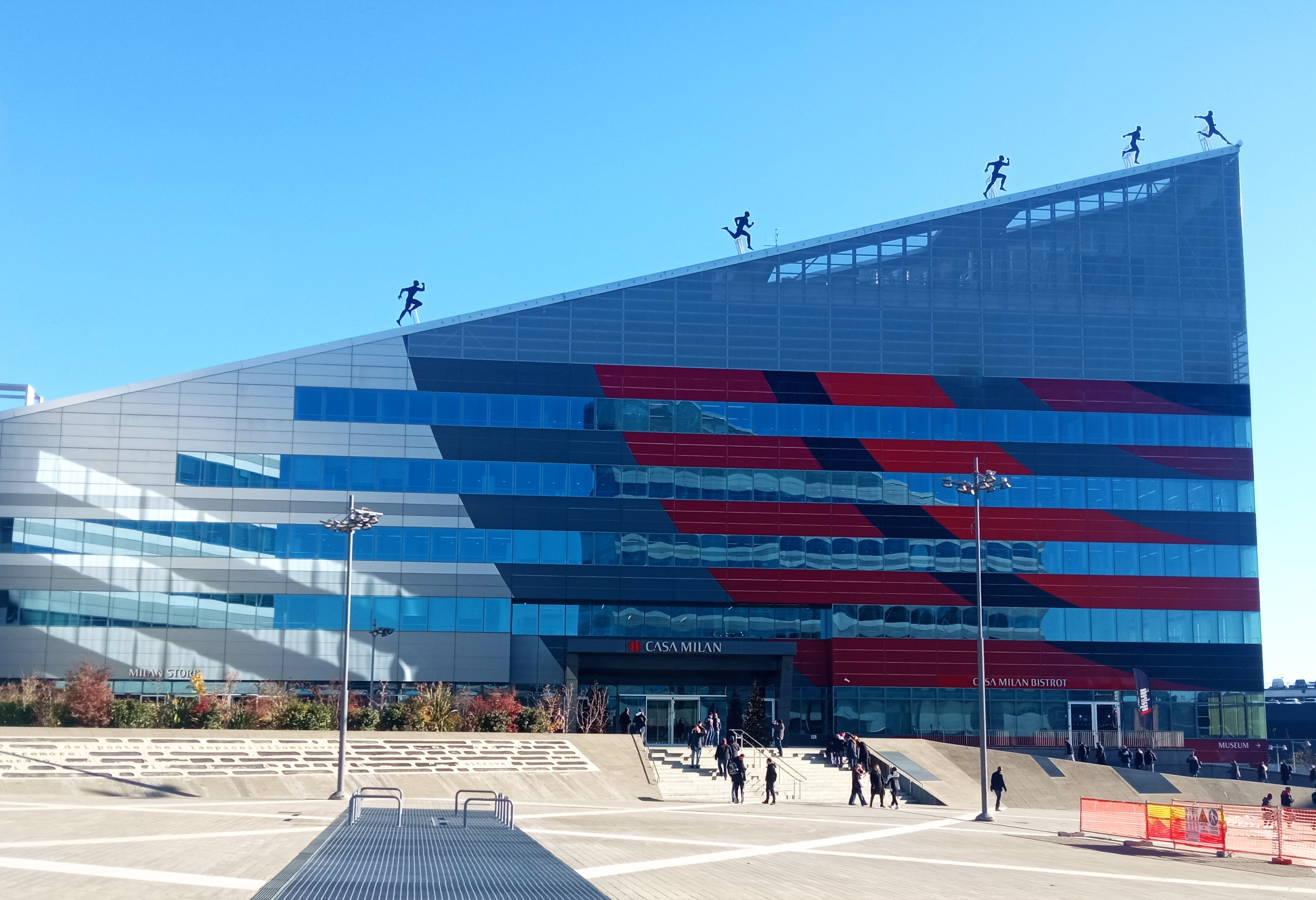
A.C. Milan headquarter

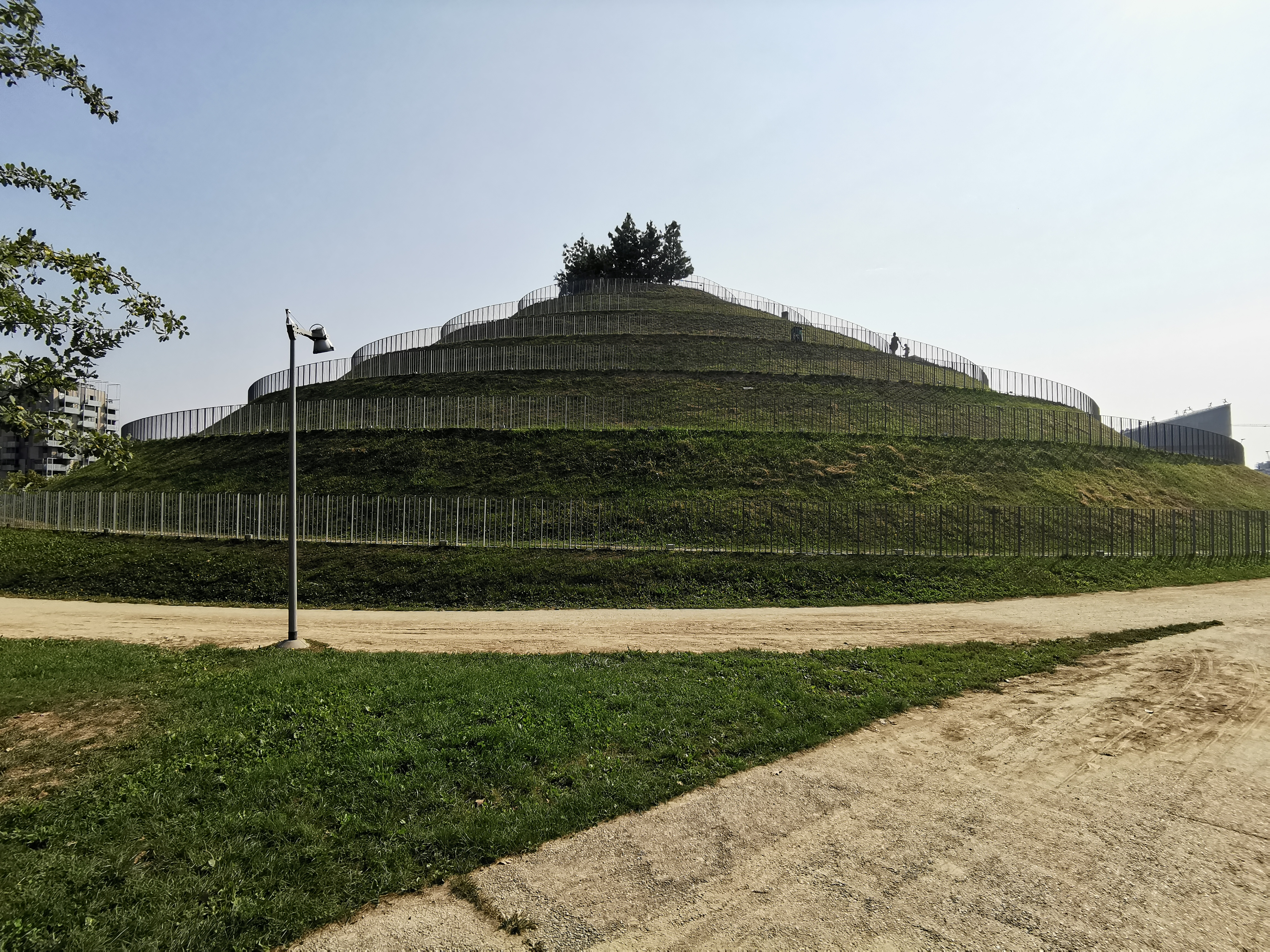
Portello park's hill

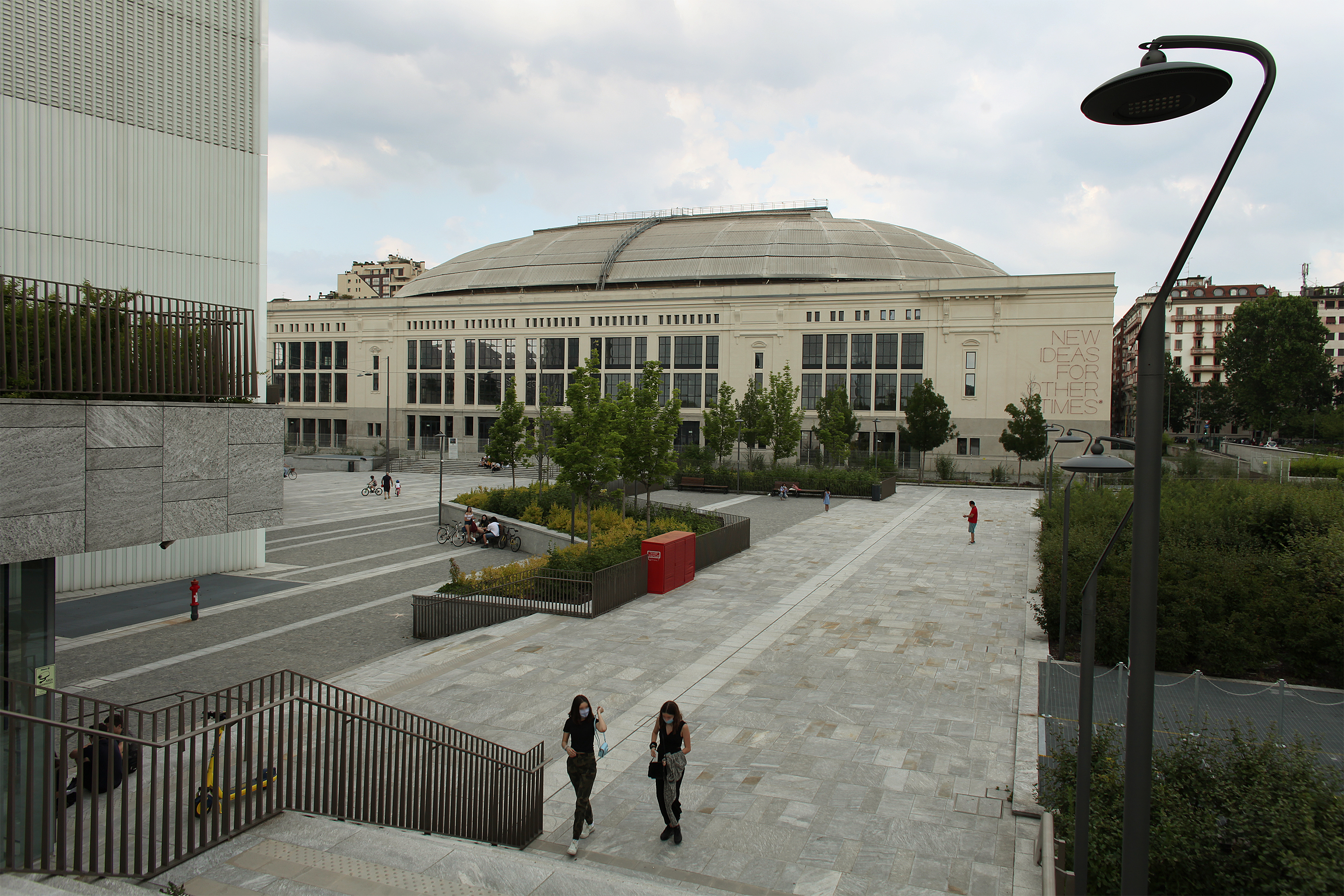
Palazzo delle Scintille

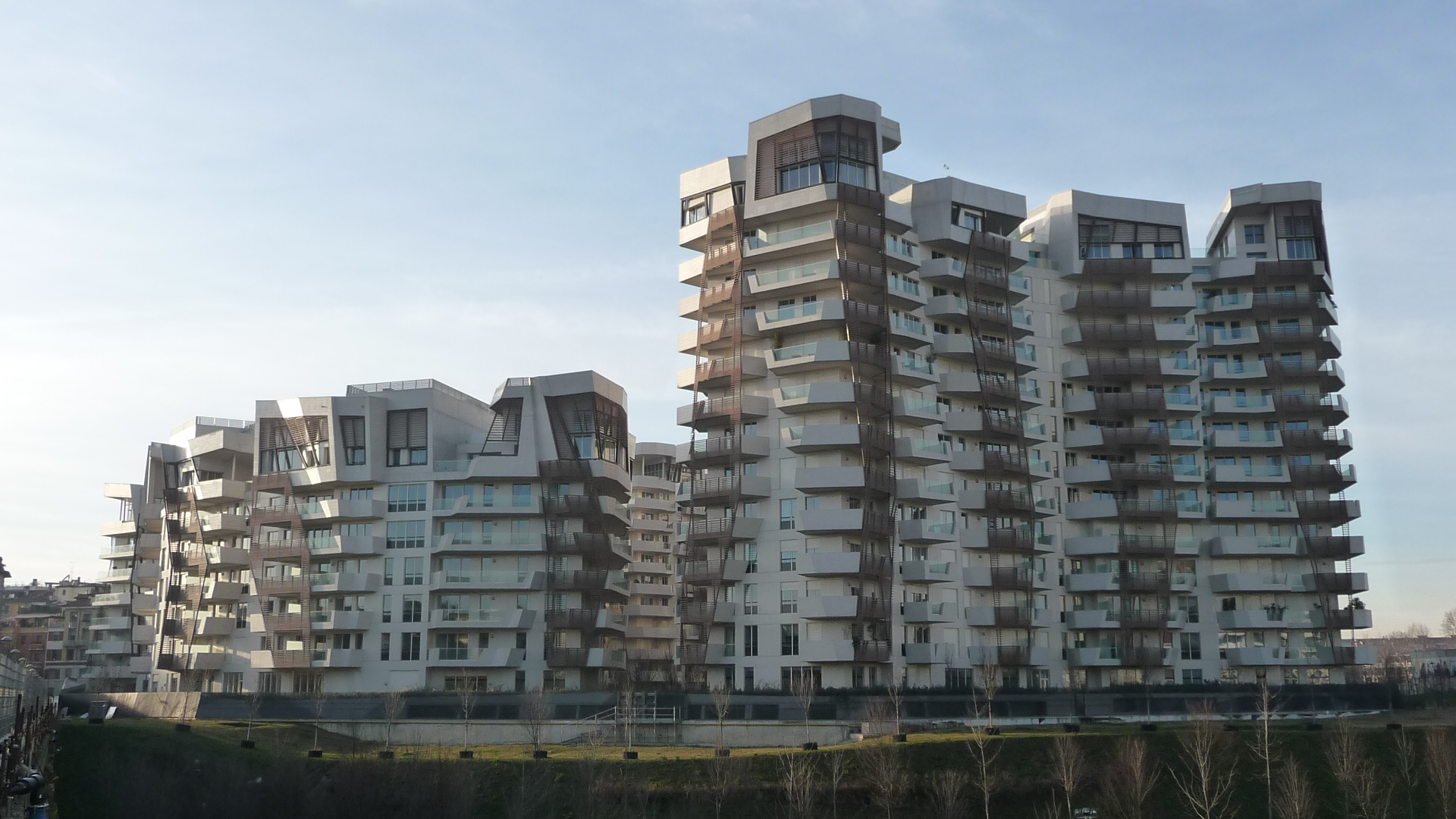
CityLife Libeskind residences

Monte Amiata Housing complex

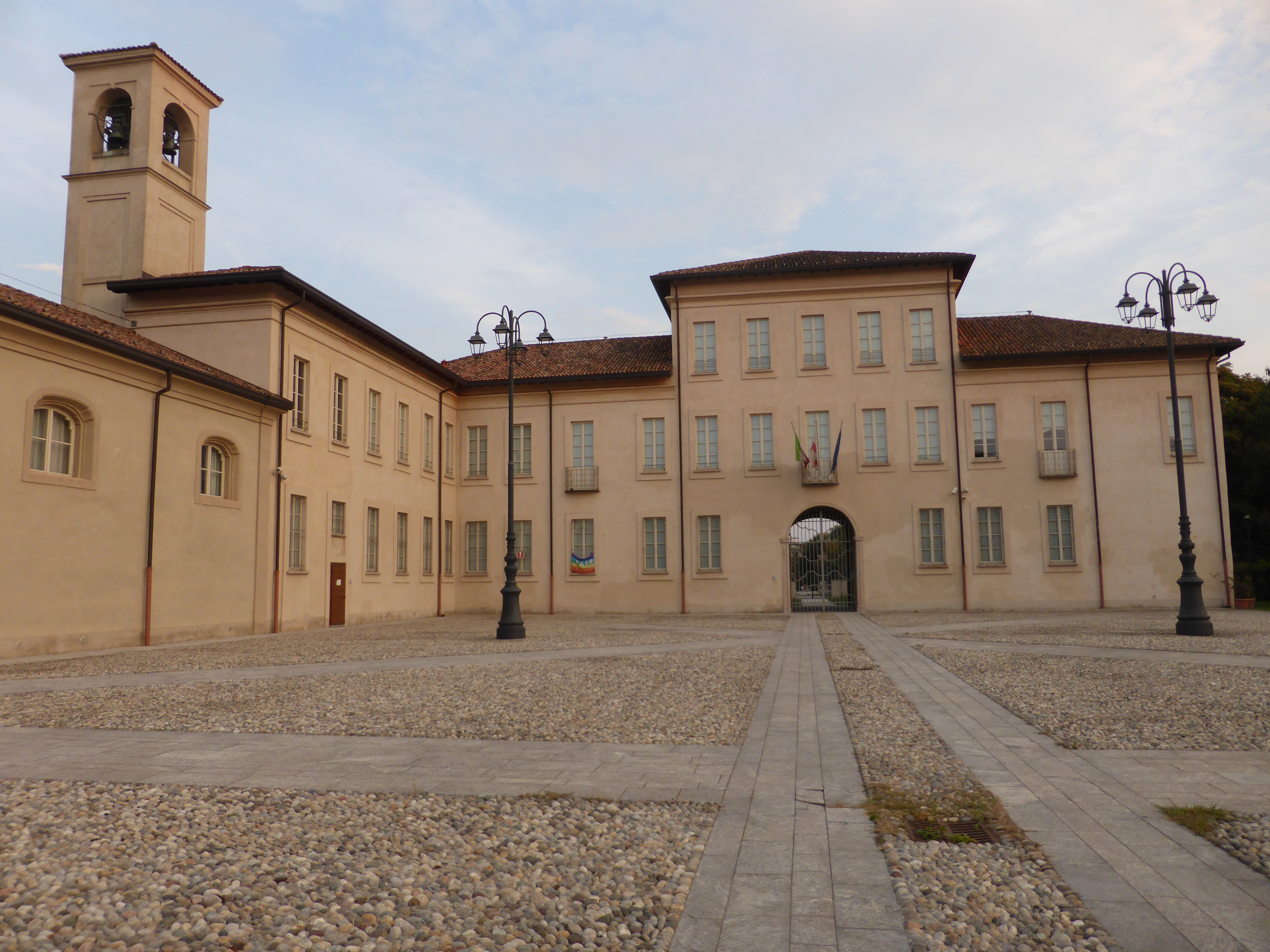
Villa Scheibler in Quarto Oggiaro

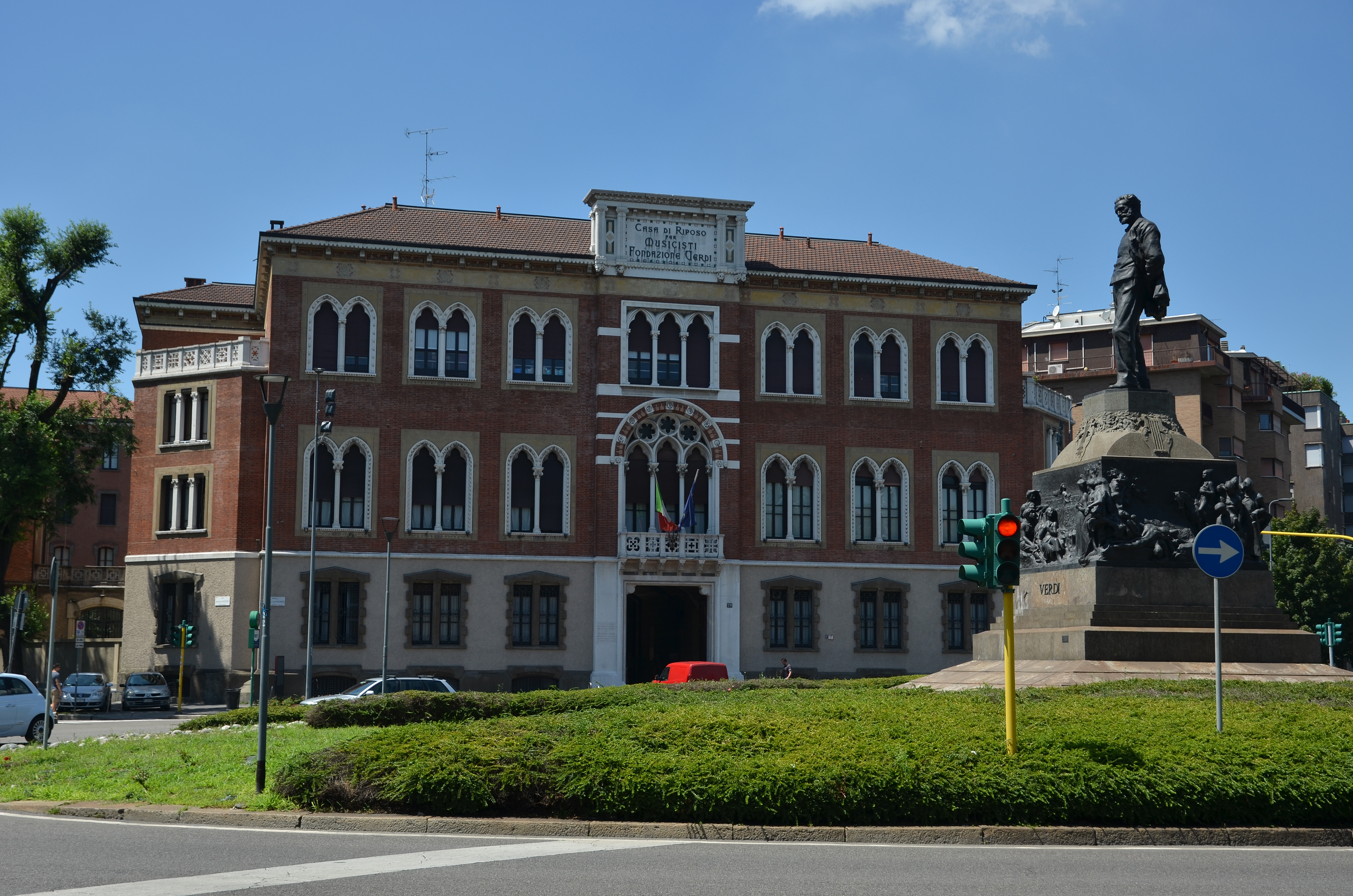
Casa di Riposo per Musicisti

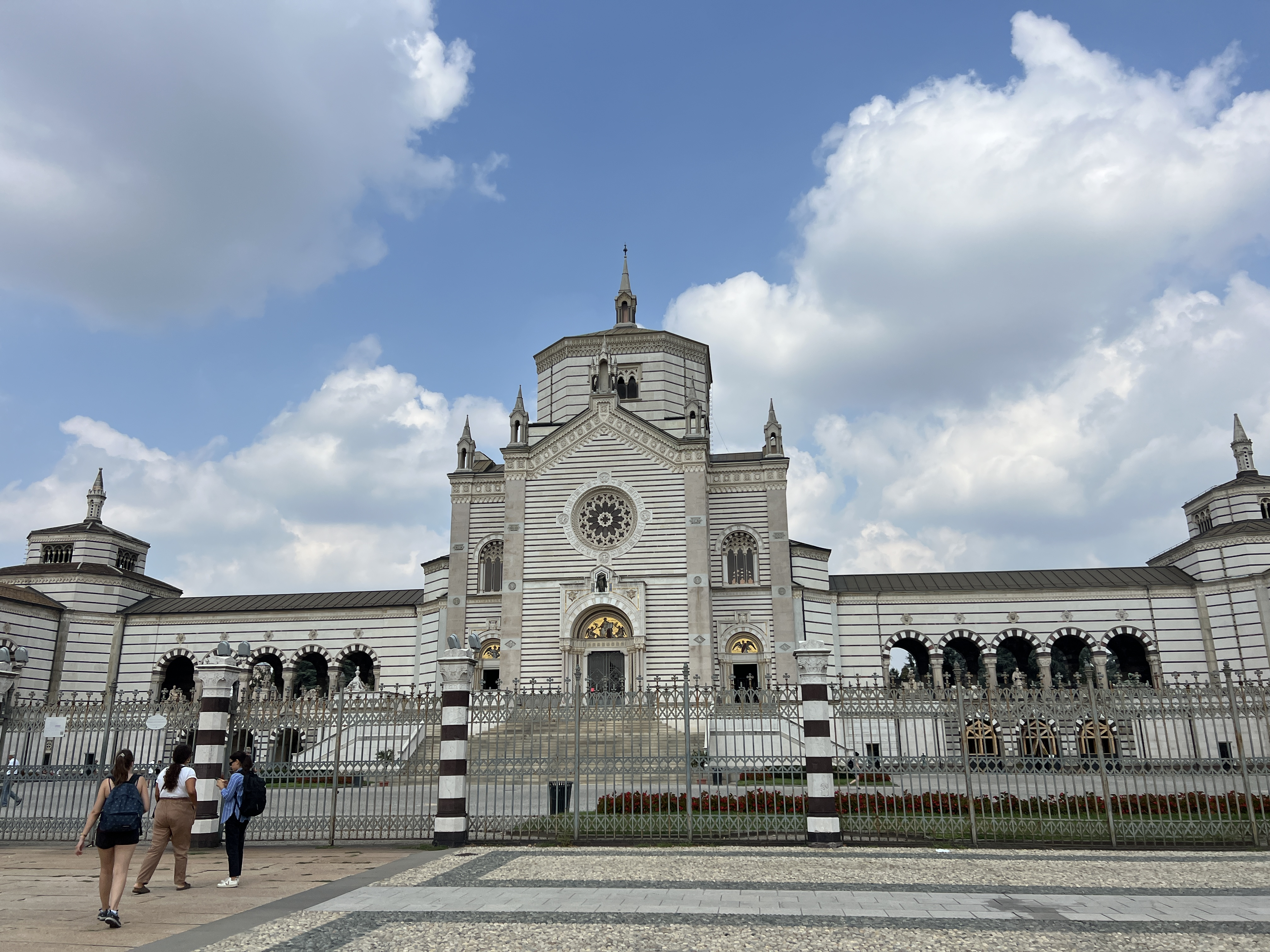
Monumental Cemetery of Milan

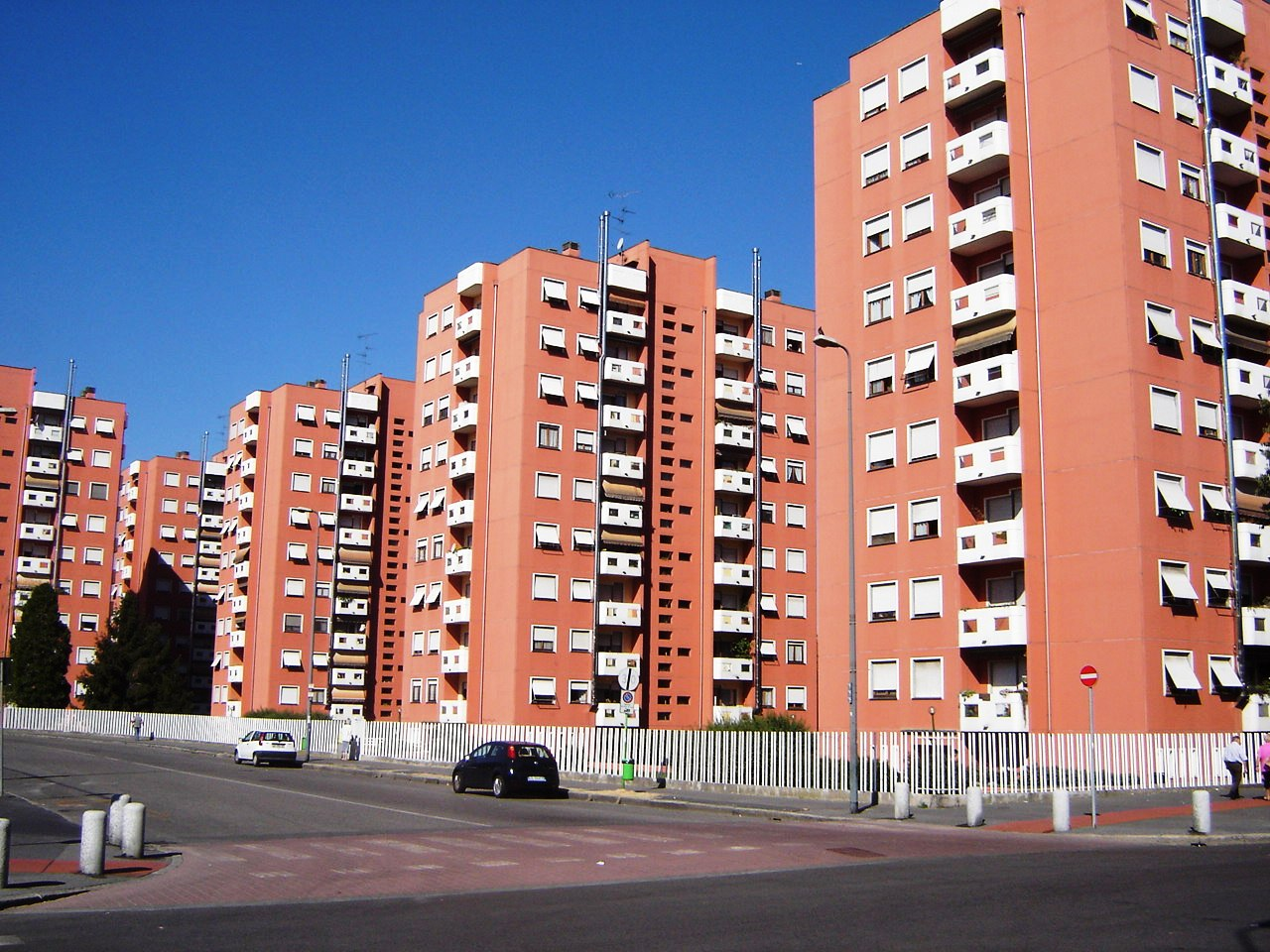
Quarto Oggiaro social residences

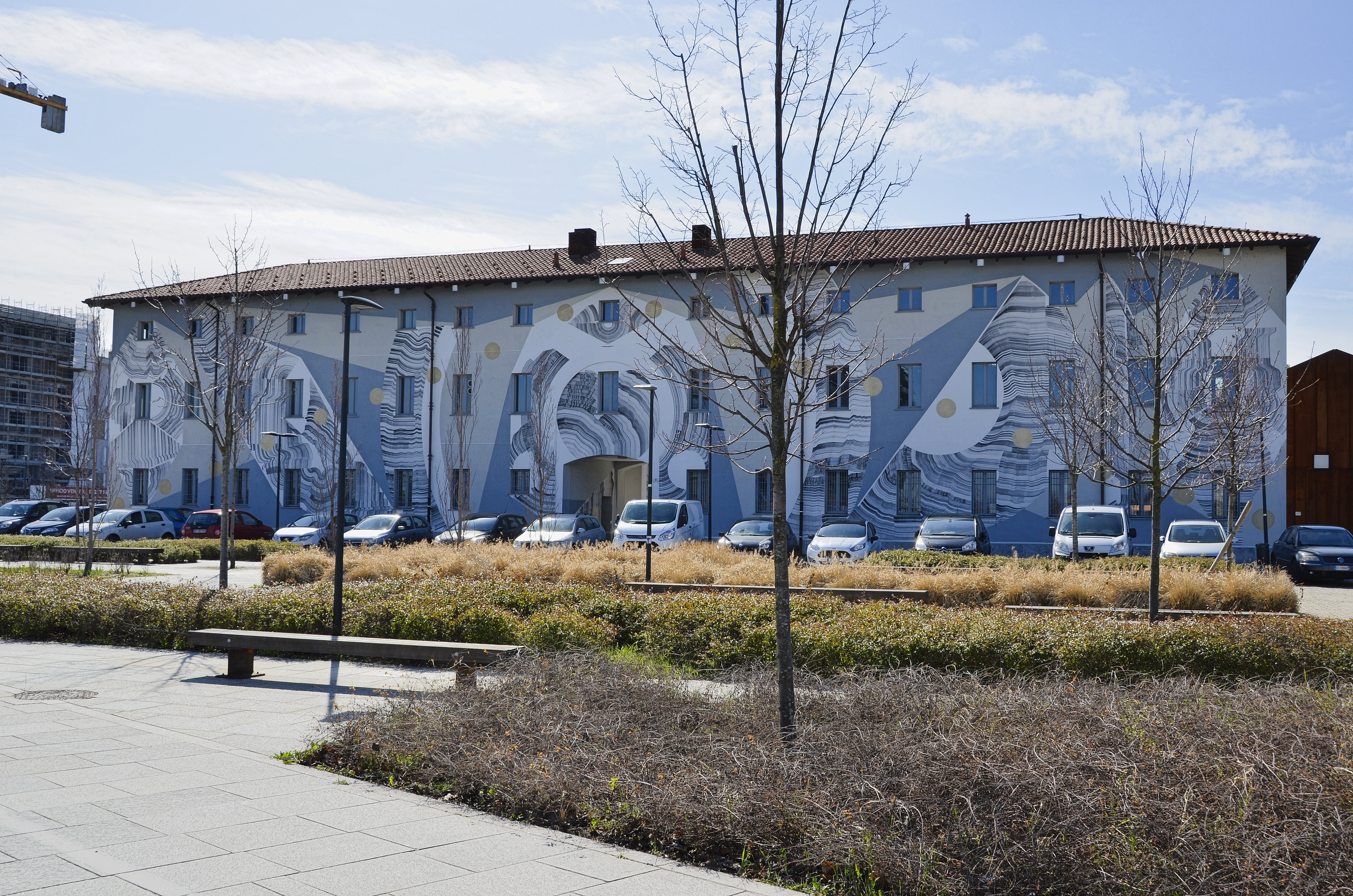
Cascina Merlata

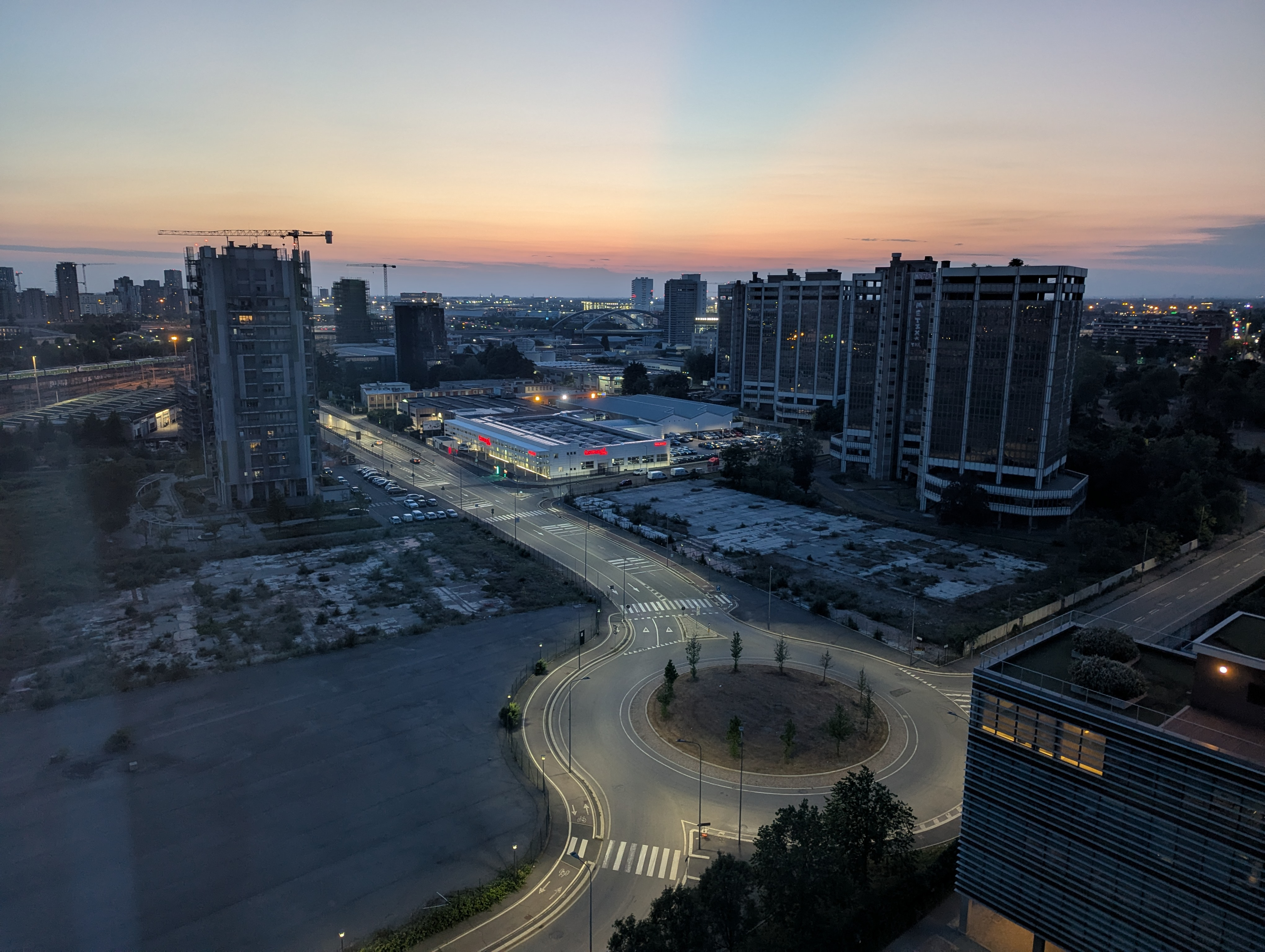
Traffic circle in the Stephenson area

== Maps ==
Map of Zone 8 of Milan
