= Quartiere Campo dei Fiori =

Coordinates: 45°29′57″N 9°09′15″E

- Quartiere of Milan
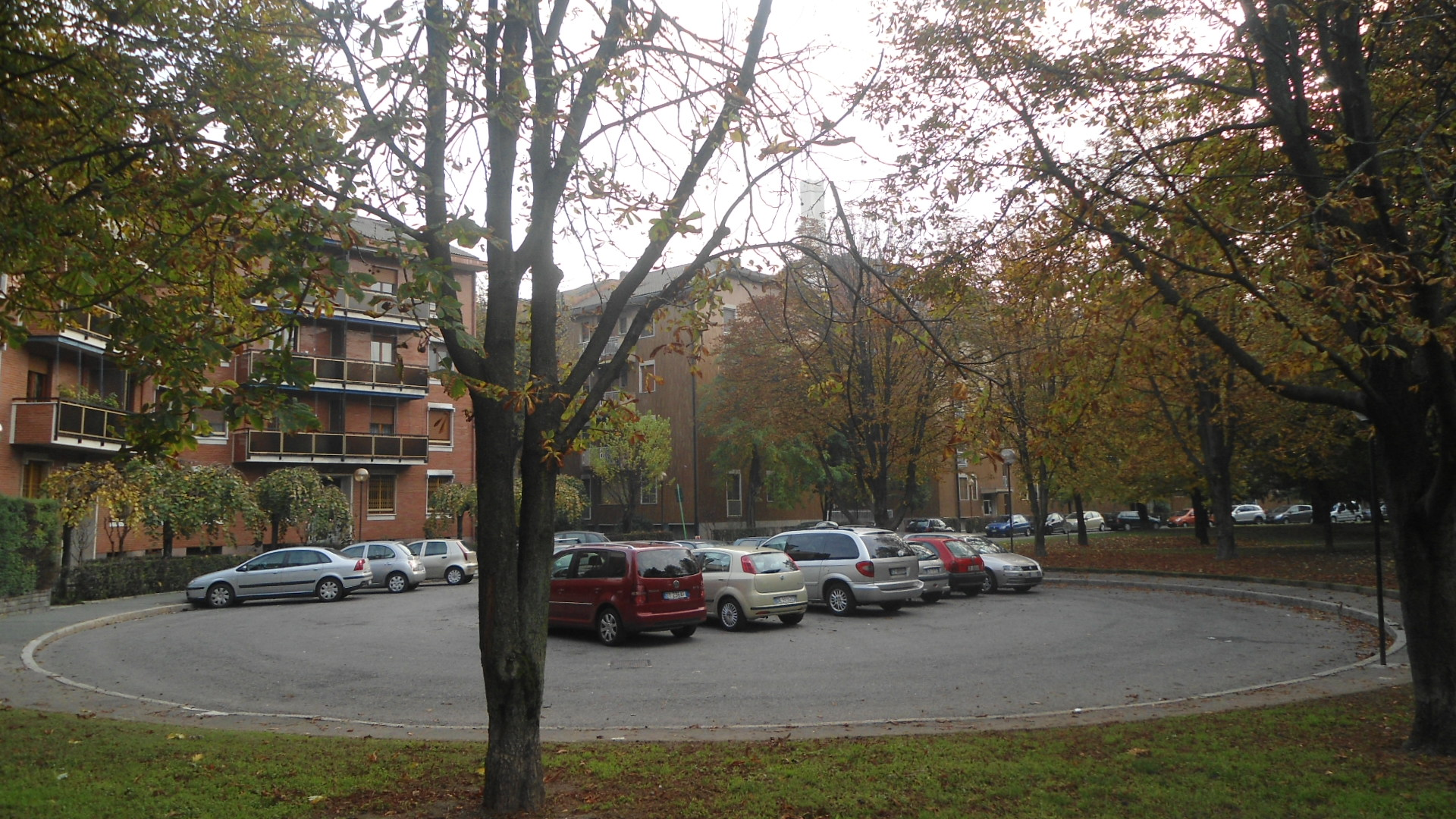
- Interactive map of Quartiere Campo dei Fiori
- Country: Italy
- Region: Lombardy
- Province: Milan
- Comune: Milan
- Zone: 8
- Time zone: UTC+1 (CET)
  - Summer (DST): UTC+2 (CEST)

Quartiere Campo dei Fiori is a small district in Milan, Italy. The district measures 400 by 300 meters (1,310 by 980 ft). It is located in the north-western outskirts of the city, and is a part of Zone 8.

The name is derived from a village ("villaggio") that arose in the early 1900s in the uncultivated area between Villapizzone and Ghisolfa. To the east, the district is bounded by the railway between Milano Porta Garibaldi and Milano Certosa. The district also marks the border with Bovisa, and represents the dividing line between Zone 8 and Zone 9.

== Overview ==
=== Construction of Villaggio Campo di Fiori ===
The Villaggio Campo di Fiori was built in 1919 by the 'Social Housing Institute' (IACP) in response to the housing needs of Milan's growing population.

The IACP decided to build the village following a plan that consisted of houses crossed by roads that carried the names of different species of trees, each with a distinct floral decor. The houses were of modest specifications, consisting of one floor with a small garden, and were designed for veterans and the disabled. The houses later housed State Railways retired personnel.

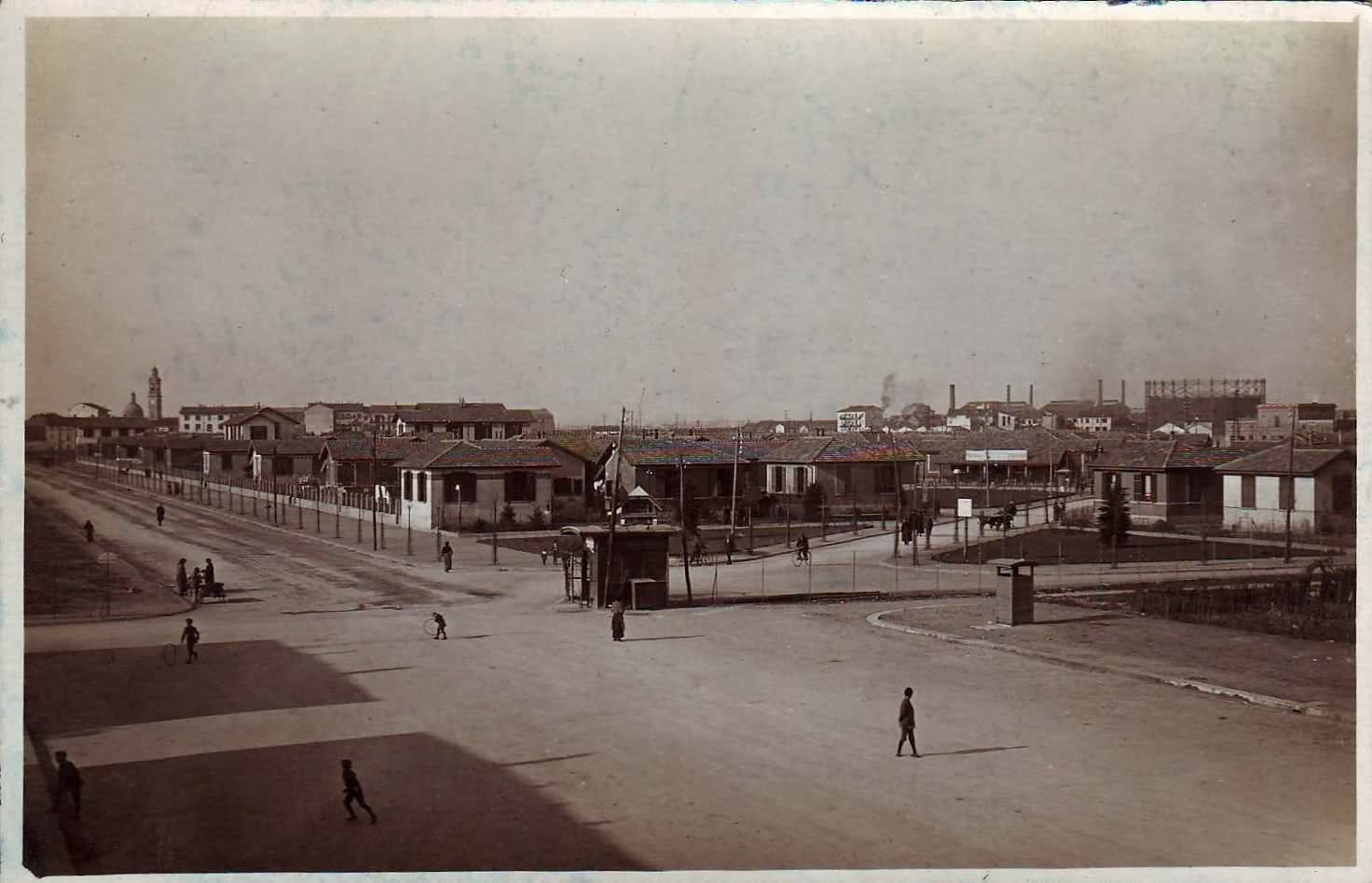
The Village viewed from Via Mac Mahon in 1921

The village had a central axis, Avenue of Sycamores, linking Via Mac Mahon and Bovisa FS. From Bovisa FS there was access to Varesine Milan Station and out to Novara and Varese. Bovisa District was accessed via a level crossing.

=== Dismantling of Villaggio Campo dei Fiori ===
After the war, the changing socio-economic conditions of the country could no longer support the inadequate housing of the time. A new urban plan was proposed for the demolition of houses and the construction of residential buildings of small and medium scale at the edges of the district. This was met with opposition from the inhabitants. They felt the current housing was sufficient, and hardly needed the new residency.

The inner, undeveloped area of the former village was abandoned and after a decade it was decided to clean up the area and turn it into a park called Campo dei Fiori. The park name has been changed to Giovanni Testori Park in memory of the writer who set some of his writings near the area.

== The District Now ==
The Quarter, located in the new structure, is now a typical and well-ordered residential area. It consists of a series of small buildings on either side of the park, with tall buildings overlooking Via Mac Mahon. It contrasts visibly with public housing neighborhoods and neighboring Cagnola and Ghisolfa.

The Bovisa Station FS was dismantled following the construction of the Milan Passante railway and replaced by Milano Villapizzone railway station a few meters away from the district. The road has been changed to access the Bovisa, which was built in Via degli Ailanti, and the railway underpass, which is located in Villapizzone.

Via Mac Mahon divides the district from Cagnola; along the division there is a tramway:

- Tram line 1, has one terminus in neighboring Piazza Pompeo Castelli and the other at Greco
- Tram line 12, between Viale Molise — Roserio

The shopping mall Esselunga has been operating since the 1970s in Via Mac Mahon

There is a church of Jesus, Mary and Joseph belonging to the Deanery Cagnola at Via Mac Mahon 113.

The schools are located nearby in Ghisolfa. The Comprehensive School Rinnovata consists of:

- Primary School Rinnovata Pizzigoni, at Via Castellino da Castello 10
- Primary School Dante Alighieri, at Via Mac Mahon 100
- Middle School Giancarlo Puecher, at Via Castellino da Castello 9

== See also ==
- Outline of Italy
- Largest cities of the European Union by population within city limits
