= Zone 8 =

Zone 8 may refer to:

- London fare zone 8, of the Transport for London zonal system
- Hardiness zone, a geographically defined zone in which a specific category of plant life is capable of growing
- Zone 8 of Milan
- Zone 8, Detroit
