= Uruguay (Milan Metro) =

Milan metro station

Coordinates: 45.4935°N 9.1205°E

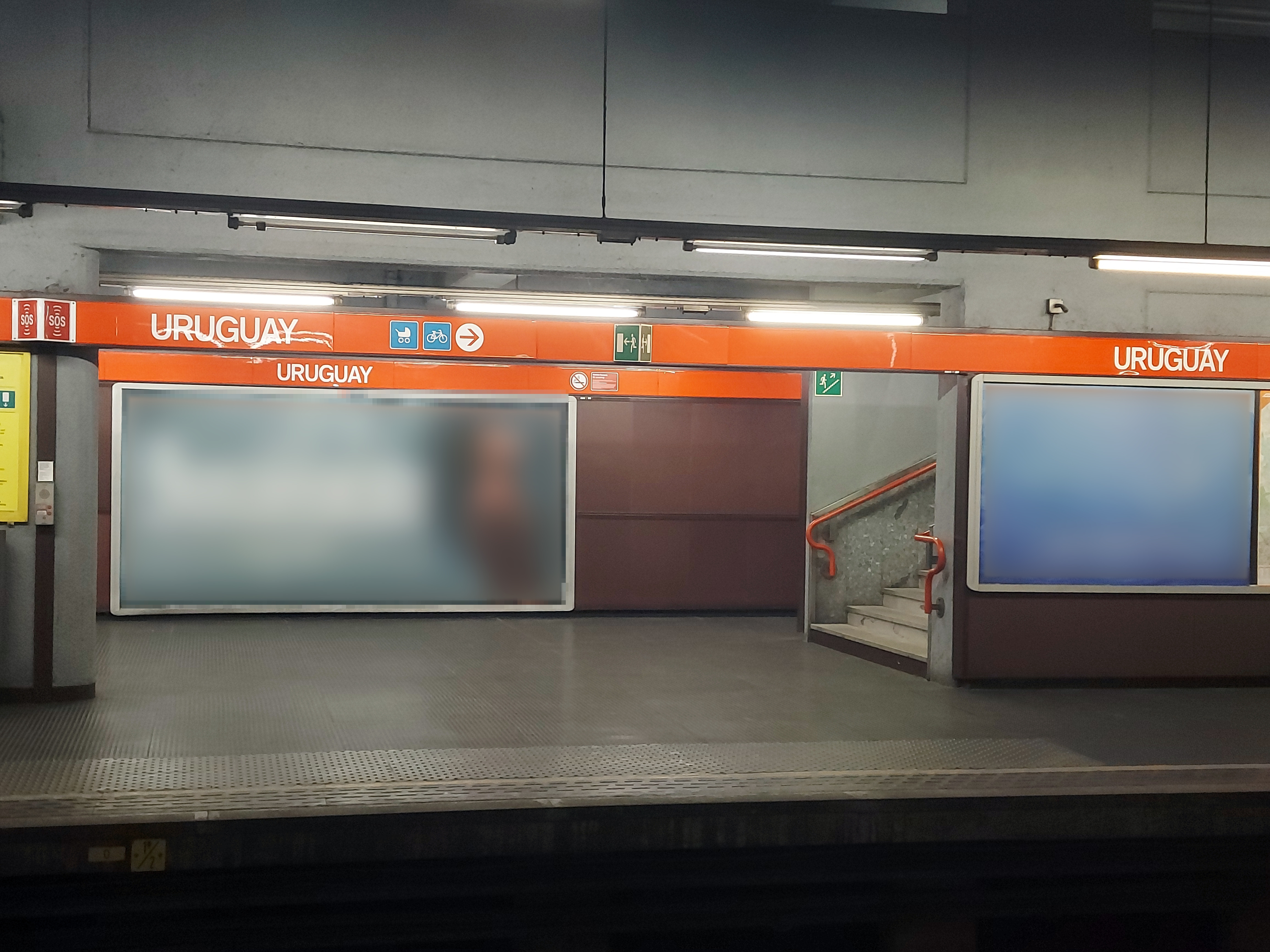

General information
- Location: Via Benedetto Croce at Via Giacomo Quarenghi, Milan
- Owner: Azienda Trasporti Milanesi
- Platforms: 2
- Tracks: 2

Construction
- Structure type: Underground

Other information
- Fare zone: STIBM: Mi1

History
- Opened: 12 April 1980; 46 years ago

Services
Preceding station	Milan Metro	Following station
Bonola towards Rho Fiera	Line 1	Lampugnano towards Sesto 1º Maggio
Location
- Location within Milan Location within Lombardy Location within Northern Italy Location within Italy

Uruguay is an underground station on Line 1 of the Milan Metro in Milan, Italy. The station was opened on 12 April 1980 as part of the extension from Lotto to San Leonardo. It is located between Via Benedetto Croce and Via Giacomo Quarenghi, near Via Uruguay.
