= Viale Pasubio =

Avenue in Milan, Italy

Coordinates: 45°28′55″N 9°11′04″E

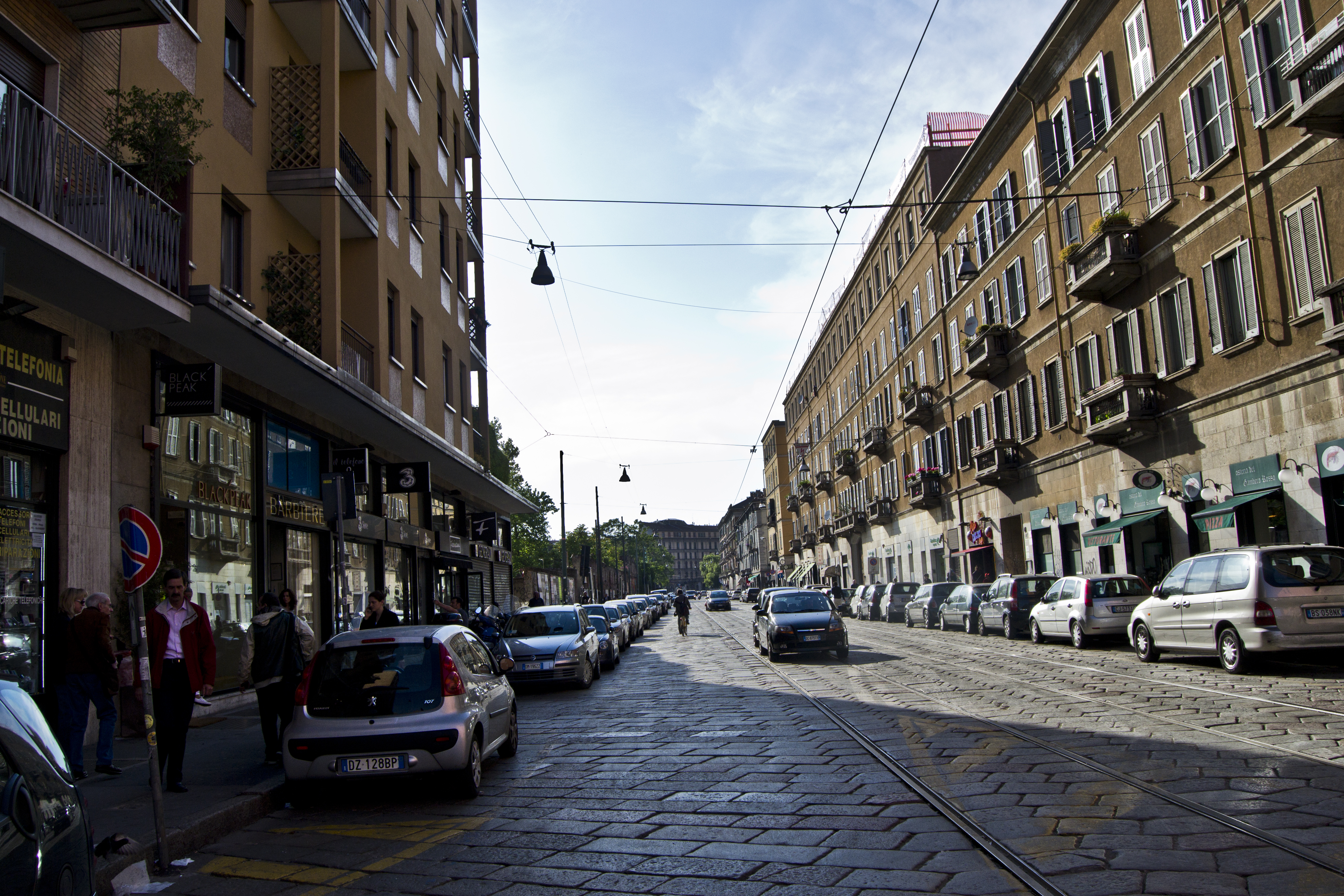
Viale Pasubio as seen from Piazza XXV Aprile

Viale Pasubio is an avenue in Milan, Italy. It is part of the circonvallazione interna ring road, a major traffic route that runs along the former Spanish walls of Milan. The street is 350 m long and connects two former city gates, namely Porta Garibaldi (now Piazza XXV Aprile) and Porta Volta (now Piazzale Antonio Bajamonti). The street was formerly known as "Viale di Porta Garibaldi" (Porta Garibaldi Avenue), and was renamed after World War I in remembrance of the fightings on the Pasubio massif (Dolomites) that occurred during the war.

The buildings in Viale Pasubio were severely damaged by Allied bombings in World War II; those on the southern side of the street were never fully restored or replaced. The ruins have been adapted to diverse purposes: a large plant nursery has been established, and a number of slum-like, abusive settlements have formed (and have been cleared by the local police) over time.

A notable building of the Viale Pasubio area is the Unilever Tower, a skyscraper built in 1962, now abandoned. Also well known to the Milanese people is the Antica Trattoria della Pesa, a historic restaurant dating back to 1880, which has preserved its original sign. The restaurant owes its name to the fact that it stands in the exact place where, in the 19th century, goods going through the Porta Volta gate were weighed to establish the duty to be paid for their transfer ("pesa" is the Italian word for weighing machine). Reportedly, the Vietnamese revolutionary leader Ho Chi Minh worked in this restaurant as a waiter in the 1930s.

Viale Pasubio (more specifically, the Antica Trattoria and a graffiti-covered wall of the ruins of the southern-side buildings) appear in the movie Happy Family (2010) directed by Gabriele Salvatores.

A thorough renewal plan has been established in December 2010 for Viale Pasubio and the adjacent area, including Porta Volta, to be implemented by the Swiss architecture firm Herzog & de Meuron and completed by 2014. The plan includes green areas as well as cultural centres, and the new headquarters of the Feltrinelli Foundation.

== See also ==
- Porta Volta
- Porta Garibaldi
