= Pero (Milan Metro) =

Milan metro station

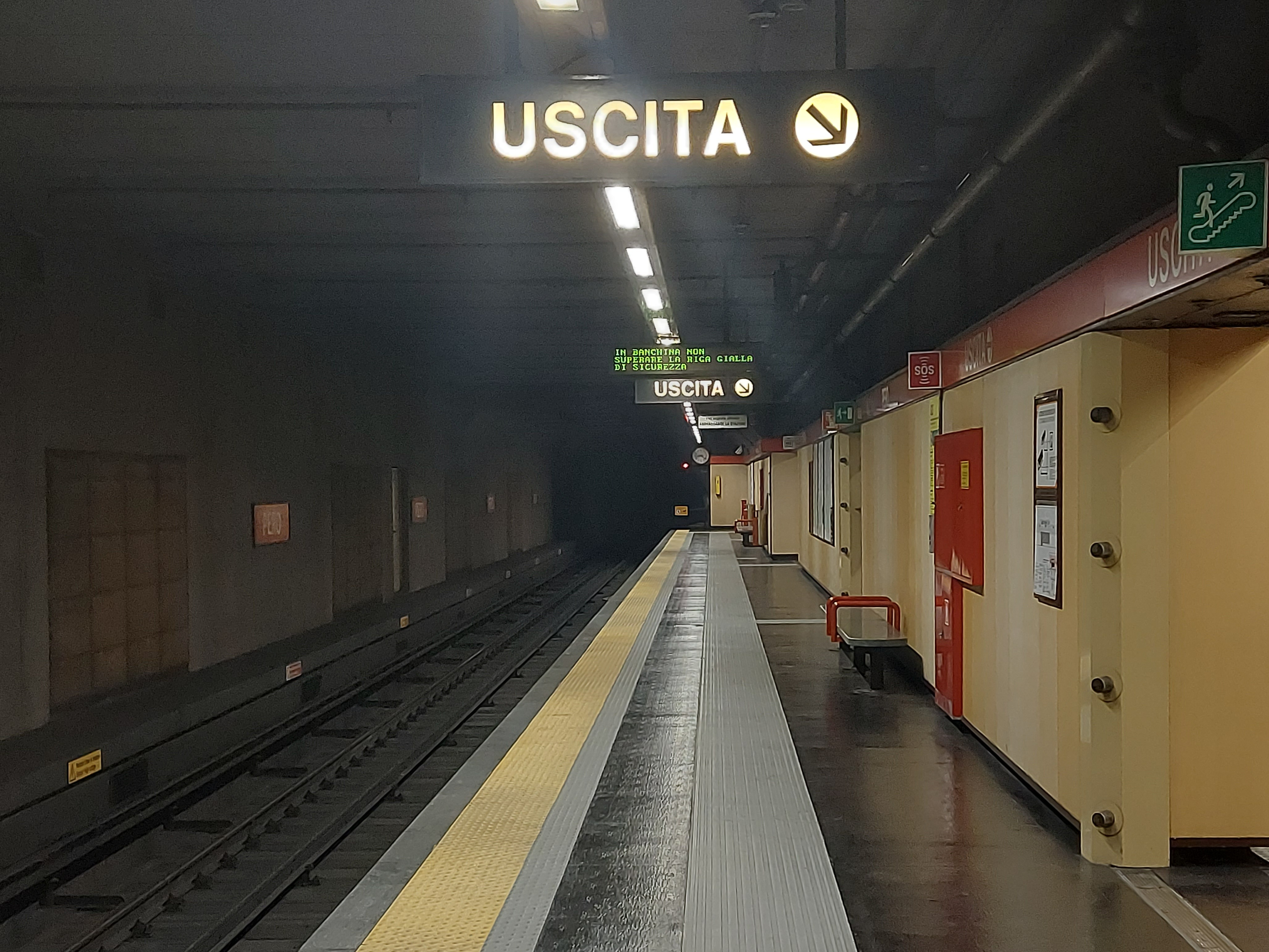

General information
- Location: Via Olona, Pero
- Coordinates: 45°30′35″N 9°05′22″E
- Owner: Azienda Trasporti Milanesi
- Platforms: 2
- Tracks: 2

Construction
- Structure type: Underground
- Accessible: yes

Other information
- Fare zone: STIBM: Mi3

History
- Opened: 19 December 2005; 20 years ago

Services
Preceding station	Milan Metro	Following station
Rho Fiera Terminus	Line 1	Molino Dorino towards Sesto 1º Maggio
Location
- Location within Milan Location within Lombardy Location within Northern Italy Location within Italy

Pero is a station on Line 1 of the Milan Metro. The station is located on Via Olona, which is in Pero, Italy. It was opened on 19 December 2005 on the section between Molino Dorino and Rho Fiera, which was already in operation. It is an underground station.
