= Bonola (Milan Metro) =

Milan metro station

Coordinates: 45.4970°N 9.1101°E

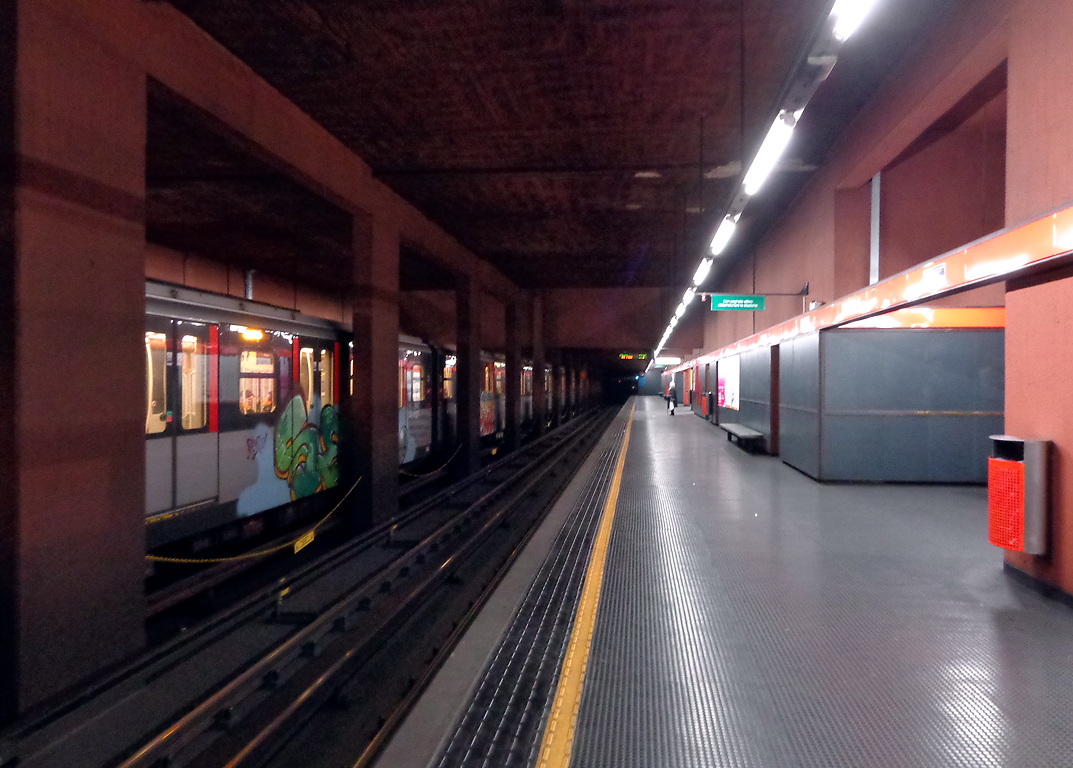

General information
- Location: Largo Paolo Valera, Milan
- Owner: Azienda Trasporti Milanesi
- Platforms: 2
- Tracks: 2

Construction
- Structure type: Underground
- Accessible: yes

Other information
- Fare zone: STIBM: Mi1

History
- Opened: 12 April 1980; 46 years ago

Services
Preceding station	Milan Metro	Following station
San Leonardo towards Rho Fiera	Line 1	Uruguay towards Sesto 1º Maggio
Location
- Location within Milan Location within Lombardy Location within Northern Italy Location within Italy

Bonola is an underground station on Line 1 of the Milan Metro in Milan, Italy. The station was opened on 12 April 1980 as part of the extension from Lotto to San Leonardo.
