= Porta Volta =

District of Milan, Italy

Coordinates: 45°28′55″N 9°10′55″E

- Quartier of Milan
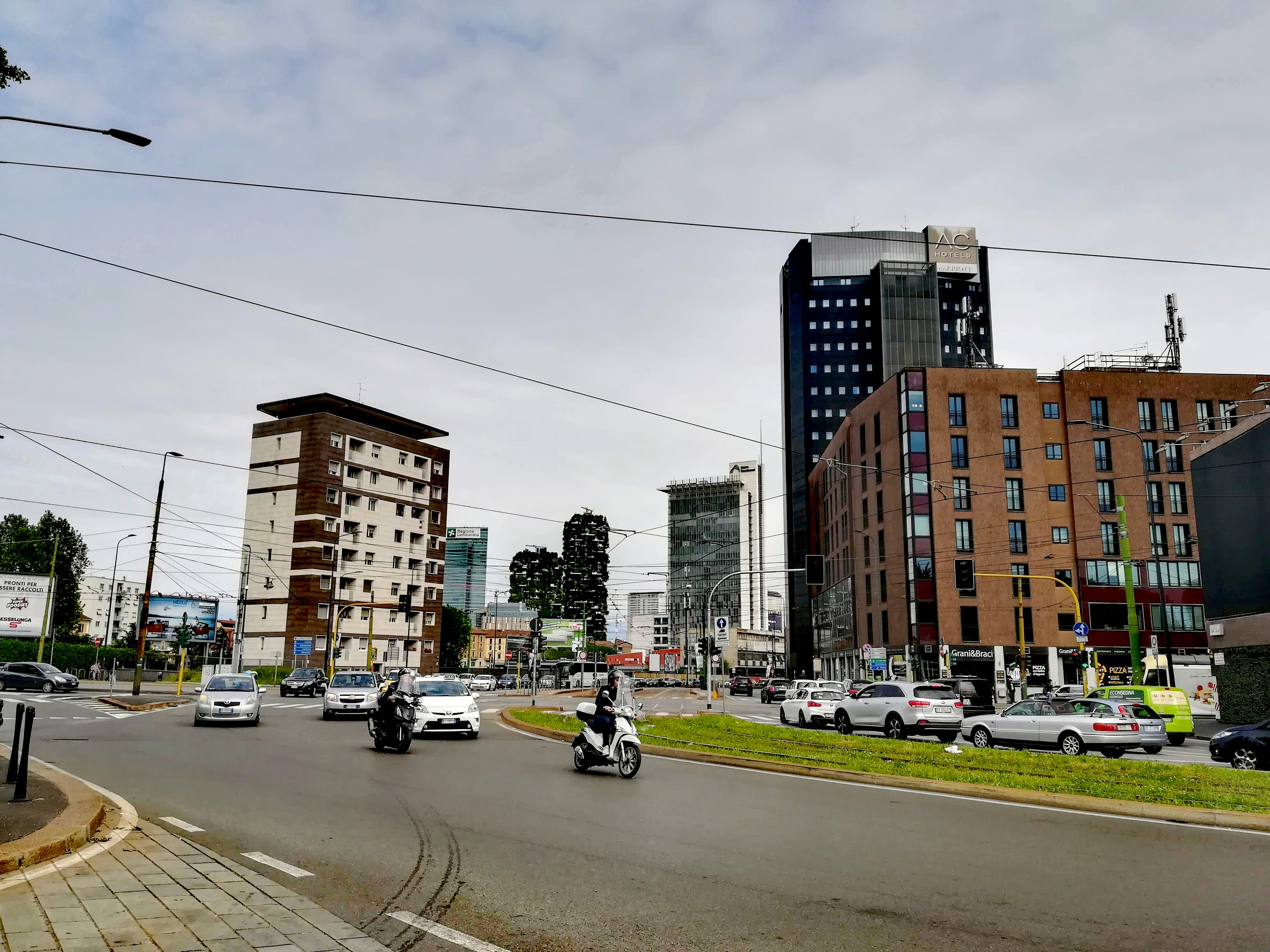
- Crossing between Piazzale Cimitero Monumentale and Via Carlo Farini.
- Interactive map of Porta Volta
- Country: Italy
- Region: Lombardy
- Province: Milan
- Comune: Milan
- Zone: 8
- Time zone: UTC+1 (CET)
  - Summer (DST): UTC+2 (CEST)

Porta Volta is a former city gate of Milan, Italy, part of the Spanish walls (16th century). Nowadays, the name "Porta Volta" is most commonly used to refer to the surrounding district ("quartiere"), part of the Zone 8 administrative division of the city.

Porta Volta was built in 1860 to connect the city to the Monumentale cemetery. In the following decades it acquired a more important role as a consequence of the construction of Milano Porta Garibaldi railway station, which interrupted the road to Como through Porta Garibaldi. A new road to Como was built to replace the old one. This road was known informally as "Comasina", formally as "Via Carlo Farini". This road branched off from Via Ceresio at Piazzale Antonio Baiamonti, a road junction located immediately outside of Porta Volta.

While the walls and the gates have been demolished, the toll gates (dating back to 1880) have remained.

An important renewal plan for the Porta Volta district has been submitted in 2010 by Swiss architecture firm Herzog & de Meuron. As a part of the plan, Porta Volta will become a cultural centre, with a large library, the new headquarters of the Feltrinelli publishing house, and vast green areas.

== See also ==
- Viale Pasubio
