= Ghisolfa =

Coordinates: 45°29′43″N 9°09′39″E

- Quartiere of Milan
- Interactive map of Ghisolfa
- Country: Italy
- Region: Lombardy
- Province: Milan
- Comune: Milan
- Zone: 8
- Time zone: UTC+1 (CET)
  - Summer (DST): UTC+2 (CEST)

Ghisolfa is a district ("quartiere") of Milan, Italy, part of the Zone 8 administrative division of the city, located north-west of the city centre. It is named after the "Ghisolfa Bridge" ("Ponte della Ghisolfa") overpass, part of the external Circonvallazione ring road enclosing the centre of Milan. In turn, the bridge was named after two cascine (farm houses), "Cascina Ghisolfa" and "Cascina Ghisolfetta", that existed in the area before the urbanization of the mid 20th century. The bridge was completed in 1941, prolonged in the 1960s, and enlarged in the 1990s.

Ghisolfa is a small district that used to be an industrial area and is now mainly residential, much like the adjacent Bovisa district. It is traversed by two railways, respectively operated by Ferrovie dello Stato and Ferrovie Nord Milano. The district is usually considered a symbol of the proletarian Milan, as low-income housing (especially "ALER" buildings) is prevalent. In recent years, it has also become one of the Milanese multi-ethnic districts. The anarchist circle of Giuseppe Pinelli and Pietro Valpreda, eponymously called "Circolo Anarchico Ponte della Ghisolfa", had its headquarters in this district.

== References in popular culture ==
Several works of Italian writer Giovanni Testori are set in the Ghisolfa district; these include La Gilda del Mac Mahon and Il Ponte della Ghisolfa. The latter was also the inspiration for Luchino Visconti's movie Rocco and His Brothers; several scenes of the movie, accordingly, were shot in the area.
