= Molino Dorino (Milan Metro) =

Milan metro station

Coordinates: 45.5052°N 9.0933°E

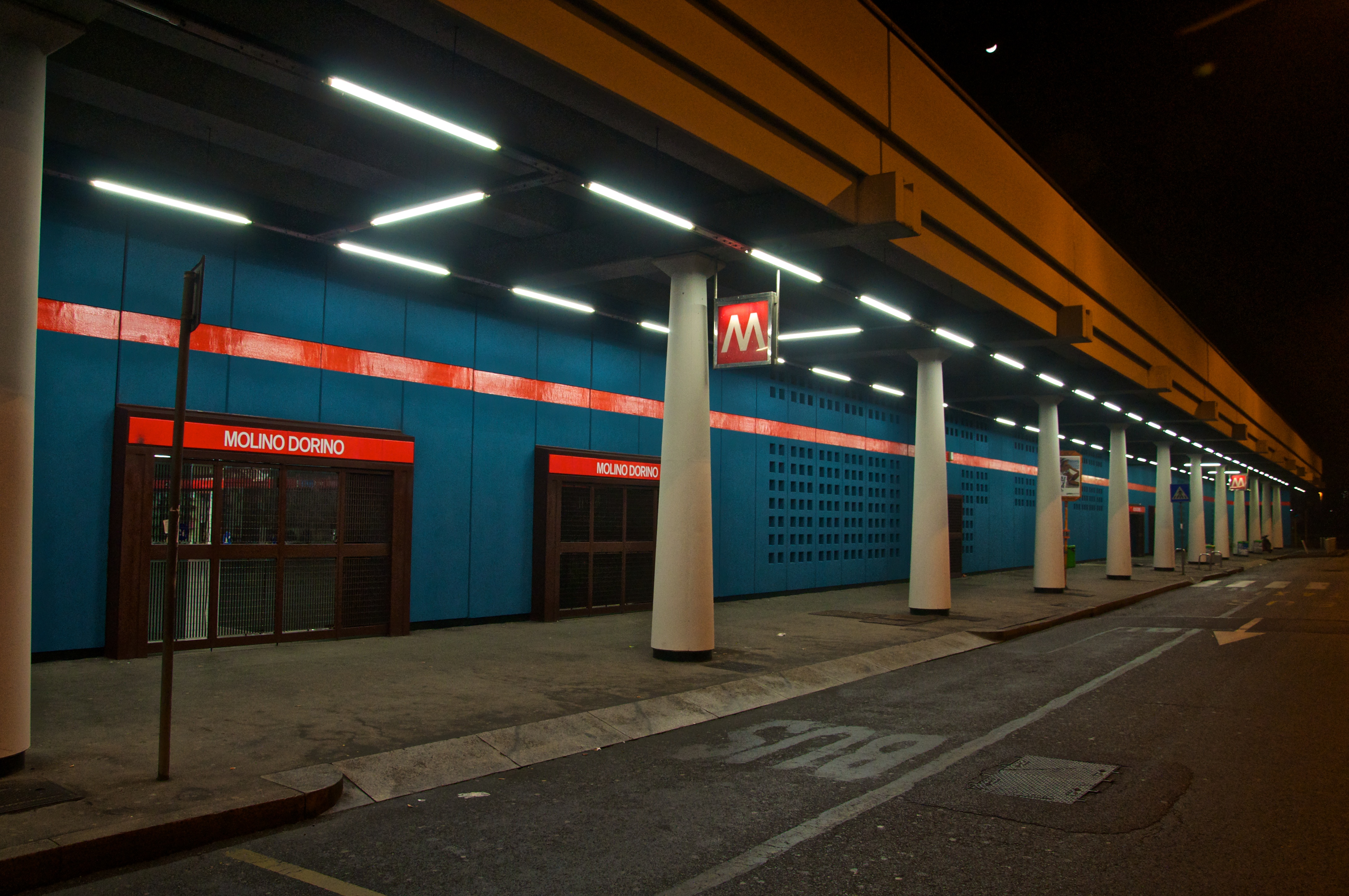
- The station entrance

General information
- Location: Via Francesco Cilea at Via Molino Dorino, Milan
- Owner: Azienda Trasporti Milanesi
- Platforms: 2
- Tracks: 2

Construction
- Structure type: Underground
- Parking: 1660 places
- Accessible: yes

Other information
- Fare zone: STIBM: Mi1

History
- Opened: 28 September 1986; 40 years ago

Services
Preceding station	Milan Metro	Following station
Pero towards Rho Fiera	Line 1	San Leonardo towards Sesto 1º Maggio
Location
- Location within Milan Location within Lombardy Location within Northern Italy Location within Italy

Molino Dorino is a station on Line 1 of the Milan Metro in Milan, Italy. The station was opened on 28 September 1986 as a one-station extension of the line from San Leonardo. On 14 September 2005, the line was extended to Rho Fiera; Pero station was only added on 19 December 2005. It is an underground station, located near the city limit. The station is located between Via Molino Dorino and Via Francesco Cilea.

The station has a car park with 1660 parking spaces.
