= San Leonardo (Milan Metro) =

Milan metro station

Coordinates: 45.5012°N 9.1015°E

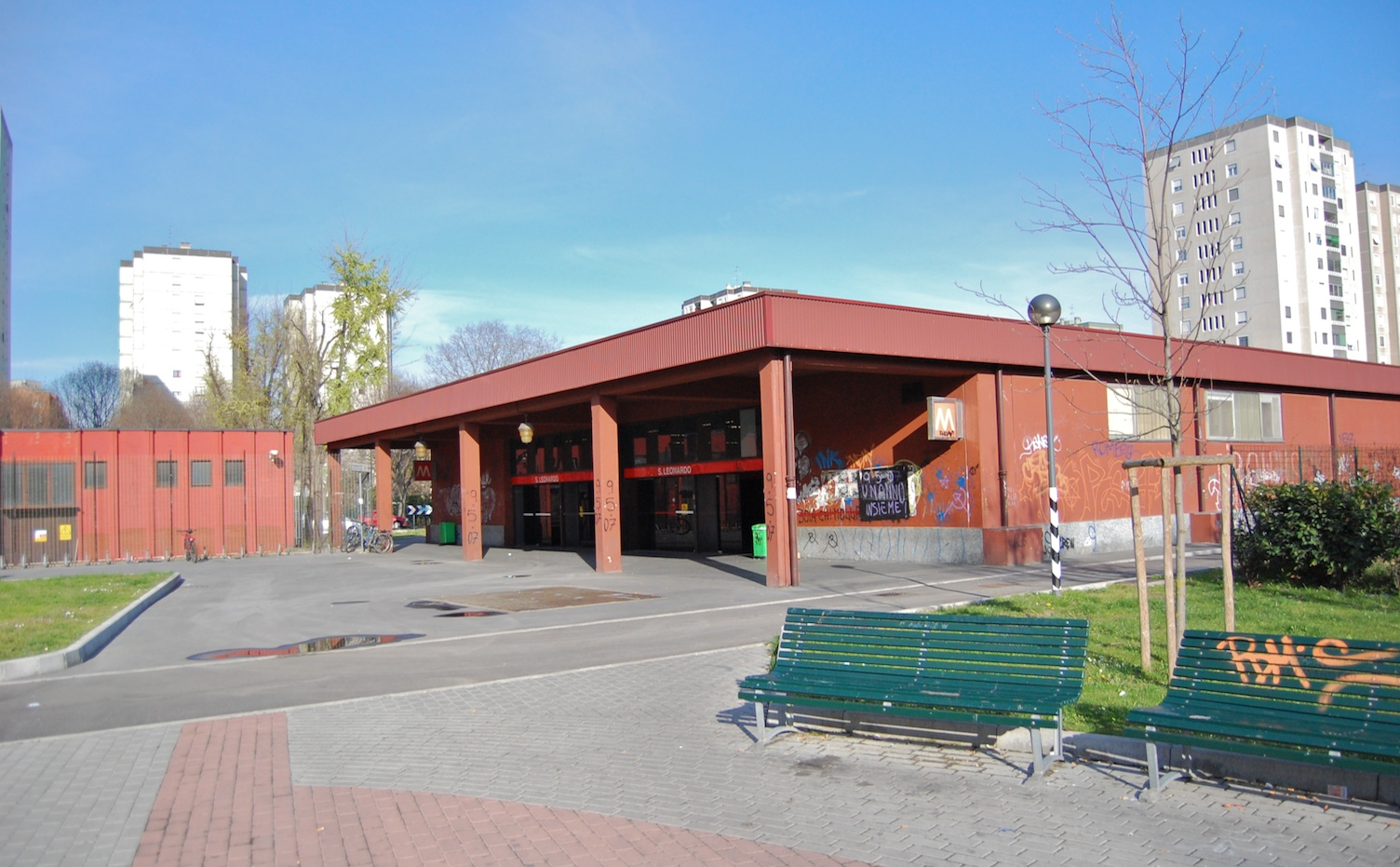

General information
- Location: Via Gaetano Fichera, Milan
- Owner: Azienda Trasporti Milanesi
- Platforms: 2
- Tracks: 2

Construction
- Structure type: Underground
- Parking: 333 places

Other information
- Fare zone: STIBM: Mi1

History
- Opened: 12 April 1980; 46 years ago

Services
Preceding station	Milan Metro	Following station
Molino Dorino towards Rho Fiera	Line 1	Bonola towards Sesto 1º Maggio
Location
- Location within Milan Location within Lombardy Location within Northern Italy Location within Italy

San Leonardo is a station on Line 1 of the Milan Metro in Milan, Italy. The station was opened on 12 April 1980 as the western terminus of the extension from Lotto to San Leonardo. On 28 September 1986, the line was extended to Molino Dorino. It is located on Via Gaetano Fichera, in the San Leonardo (Gallaratese) district, from which it takes its name. It is an underground station, located within the urban fare limit.

The station has a car park with 333 spaces.
