= Villapizzone =

Coordinates: 45°30′05″N 9°08′55″E

Villapizzone Villapizzon (Lombard)
- Quartiere of Milan
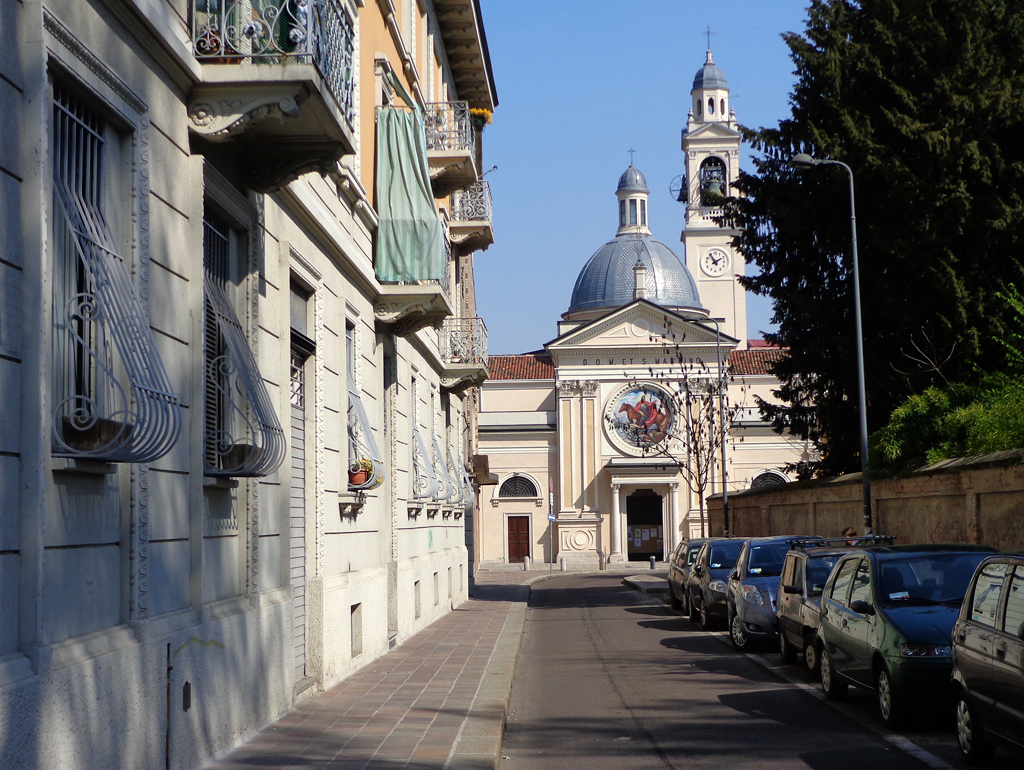
- Via Villapizzone and the church of San Martino
- Interactive map of Villapizzone
- Country: Italy
- Region: Lombardy
- Province: Milan
- Comune: Milan
- Zone: 8
- Time zone: UTC+1 (CET)
  - Summer (DST): UTC+2 (CEST)

Villapizzone is a district ("quartiere") of Milan, Italy. It belongs to the Zone 8, located north of the city centre. It was an autonomous comune until 1869.

== History ==
The origins of Villapizzone traditionally traces back to the 6th century, when a saintly Greek monk named Atanasio Piccione settled down in a forest and began to lead a community of Greek friars. The place was named Villaggio Piccione or Villa Piccione, hence Villapizzone. According to Giacomo Stella, who was the dean of the local church of San Martino in 1530, the friars initially deforested an area to cultivate it, then they built a little village consisting of some farmhouse and a church.

Documented references to the comune of Villapizzone date back at least to 1346. In the Late Middle Ages and until the 18th century, the comune used to be part of the pieve of Trenno. During Napoleonic rule, in 1808, Villapizzone was annexed to Milan, but regained its autonomy in 1816 with the establishment of the Kingdom of Lombardy–Venetia. In 1869 the comune was annexed to Musocco, which in turn became part of Milan municipality in 1923. Historical documents attest that, at that time, Villapizzone had its own cemetery, which was later dismantled.

The core of the village was the parish church of San Martino, in front of which was built a villa, owned by the noble Radice Fossati family. A woodland, which was initially a portion of the ancient Bosco della Merlata, was located in the area, and some of the trees that belonged to the forest are now beside of Via Paolo Mantegazza, in what is now the yard of the Goffredo Mameli elementary school.

Villapizzone remained a rural district until World War II; thereafter, it became part of a seamless residential area that includes Bovisa, Quarto Oggiaro and several other districts. The toponym "Villapizzone" itself was scarcely used for several decades; it reappeared in the late 20th century as a consequence of the construction of the station of the same name.

=== 21st Century ===
There is an Intentional community of Jesuits, founded in 2003 in the neighborhood.

Subplace, a community centre and exhibition space, was established in the neighborhood in 2022.

== Transports ==
The suburb is served by the Milano Villapizzone railway station, which is located at the junction between the Turin-Milan railway and the Milan Passante railway and is managed by RFI. The station is served by three suburban lines (S5, S6 and S11) and by regional trains, managed by Trenord. The station replaced the old Milano Bovisa railway station, dismantled in 1997.

Several tram and bus lines connect Villapizzone to the city center and to nearby suburbs.
