= Milano Certosa railway station =

Railway station in Milan, Italy

Milano Certosa
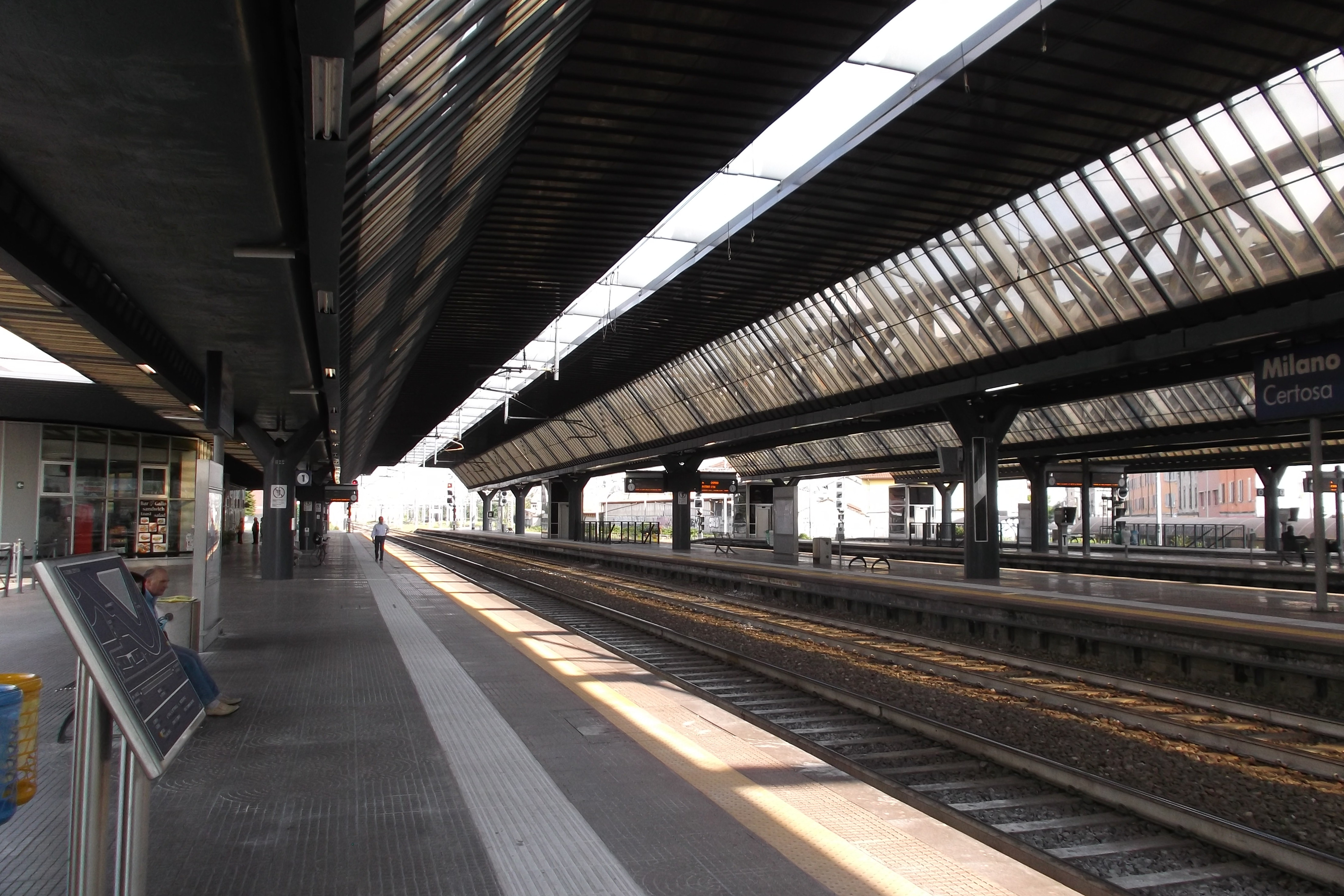
- Milano Certosa FS

General information
- Location: Via Antonio Mambretti; Milan, Milan, Lombardy; Italy
- Coordinates: 45°30′24″N 09°08′11″E
- Owner: Rete Ferroviaria Italiana
- Operator: Trenord
- Lines: Milan–Turin; Milan–Domodossola
- Distance: 8.526 km (5.298 mi) from Milano Centrale; 13.316 km (8.274 mi) from bivio Lambro
- Platforms: 7
- Connections: ATM trams; ATM buses

Construction
- Architect: Angelo Mangiarotti

Other information
- Fare zone: STIBM: Mi1
- Classification: Silver

History
- Opened: 18 October 1858; 167 years ago
- Rebuilt: 19 September 1999
- Electrified: 14 October 1901

Services
Preceding station	Trenord	Following station
Rho Fiera towards Varese	Line S5 (Milan suburban railway service)	Milano Villapizzone towards Treviglio
Rho Fiera towards Novara	Line S6 (Milan suburban railway service)	Milano Villapizzone towards Treviglio
Rho Fiera towards Rho	Line S11 (Milan suburban railway service)	Milano Villapizzone towards Chiasso
Location
- Location within Milan Location within Lombardy Location within Northern Italy Location within Italy

Milano Certosa is a surface railway station in Milan, Italy. The station is on the north-west part of the city between the Quarto Oggiaro and Musocco neighborhoods. Its name comes from the Certosa di Garegnano. The station is located on Via Antonio Mambretti. The train services are operated by Trenord.

The station is the oldest still operating in Milan, and the only one established by the Austrian Empire before the unification of Italy.

== Train services ==
The station is served by the following services:

- Milan Metropolitan services (S5) Varese - Rho - Milan - Treviglio
- Milan Metropolitan services (S6) Novara - Rho - Milan - Pioltello - (only peak service) Treviglio
- Milan Metropolitan services (S11) Rho - Milan - Monza - Seregno - Como - Chiasso

== See also ==
- Railway stations in Milan
- Milan suburban railway service
