= Milano Villapizzone railway station =

Railway station in Milan, Italy

Milano Villapizzone
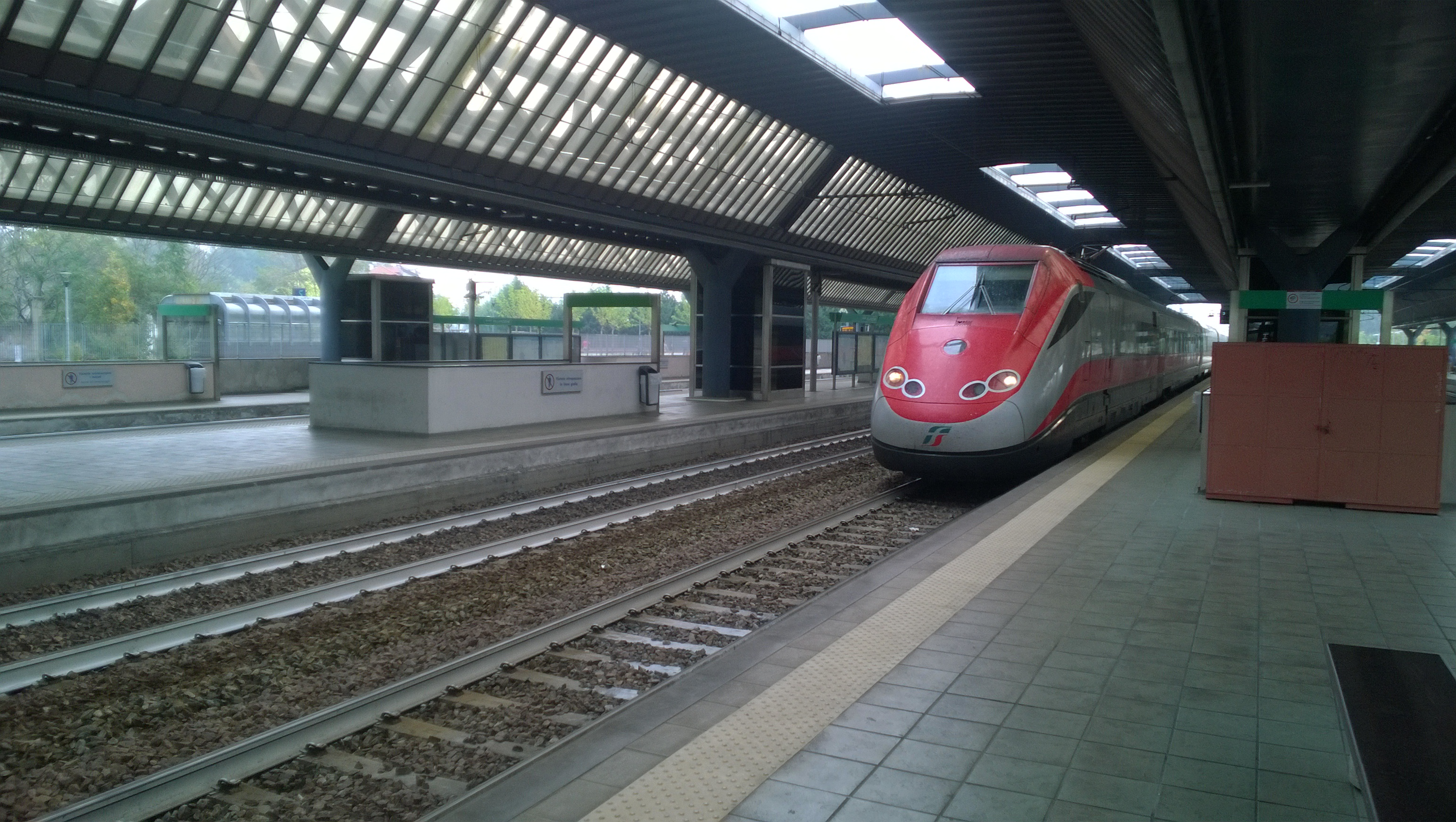
- Milano Villapizzone FS

General information
- Location: Via Arnaldo Fusinato; Milan, Milan, Lombardy; Italy
- Coordinates: 45°30′07″N 09°09′03″E
- Owner: Rete Ferroviaria Italiana
- Operator: Trenord
- Lines: Milan Passante railway Milan–Turin; Milan–Domodossola
- Distance: 12.036 km (7.479 mi) from Bivio Lambro to the Milan–Venice railway
- Platforms: 4
- Tracks: 6
- Connections: ATM trams

Construction
- Architect: Angelo Mangiarotti

Other information
- Fare zone: STIBM: Mi1
- Classification: Silver

History
- Opened: 2002; 24 years ago

Services
Preceding station	Trenord	Following station
Milano Certosa towards Varese	Line S5 (Milan suburban railway service)	Milano Lancetti towards Treviglio
Milano Certosa towards Novara	Line S6 (Milan suburban railway service)	Milano Lancetti towards Treviglio
Milano Certosa towards Rho	Line S11 (Milan suburban railway service)	Milano Porta Garibaldi towards Chiasso
Location
- Location within Milan Location within Lombardy Location within Northern Italy Location within Italy

Milano Villapizzone is a surface railway station in Milan, Italy and serves the suburb of Villapizzone. It opened in 2002 as part of the Milan Passante railway. It is located on Via Arnaldo Fusinato.

The station, together with Bovisa station, also serves the Bovisa campus of the Politecnico di Milano. The train services are operated by Trenord.

== Train services ==
The station is served by the following services:

- Milan Metropolitan services (S5) Varese - Rho - Milan - Treviglio
- Milan Metropolitan services (S6) Novara - Rho - Milan - Treviglio
- Milan Metropolitan services (S11) Rho - Milan - Monza - Seregno - Como - Chiasso

== See also ==
- Railway stations in Milan
- Milan suburban railway service
