= Rho Fiera (Milan Metro) =

Milan metro station

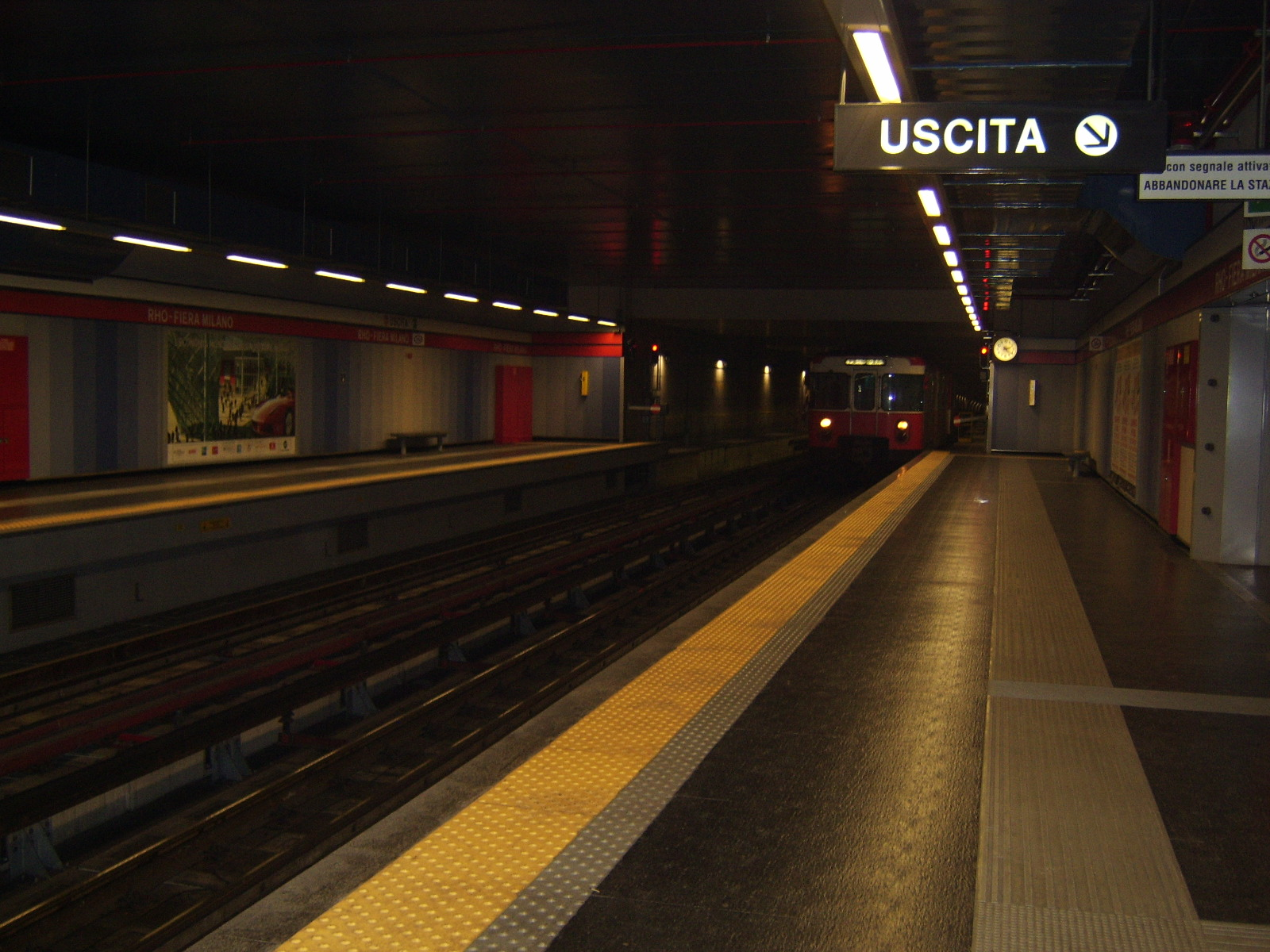

General information
- Location: Largo Metropolitana, Rho
- Coordinates: 45°31′11.4″N 9°05′13.3″E
- Owner: Azienda Trasporti Milanesi
- Platforms: 2
- Tracks: 2
- Connections: Rho Fiera railway station

Construction
- Structure type: Underground
- Accessible: y

Other information
- Fare zone: STIBM: Mi3

History
- Opened: 14 September 2005; 20 years ago

Services
Preceding station	Milan Metro	Following station
Terminus	Line 1	Pero towards Sesto 1º Maggio
Location
- Location within Milan Location within Lombardy Location within Northern Italy Location within Italy

Rho Fiera is a station on Line 1 of the Milan Metro in Rho, Lombardy, Italy. It was opened on 14 September 2005 as a one-station extension from Molino Dorino; Pero station was only added on 19 December 2005. The station provides service to the FieraMilano exhibitition centre and is the current western terminus of the line. It is the westernmost station on the network. The station is outside the urban area of Milan. There is a special ticket, single or return, available for people travelling from Milan in order to visit the exhibitition centre by way of Rho Fiera station.

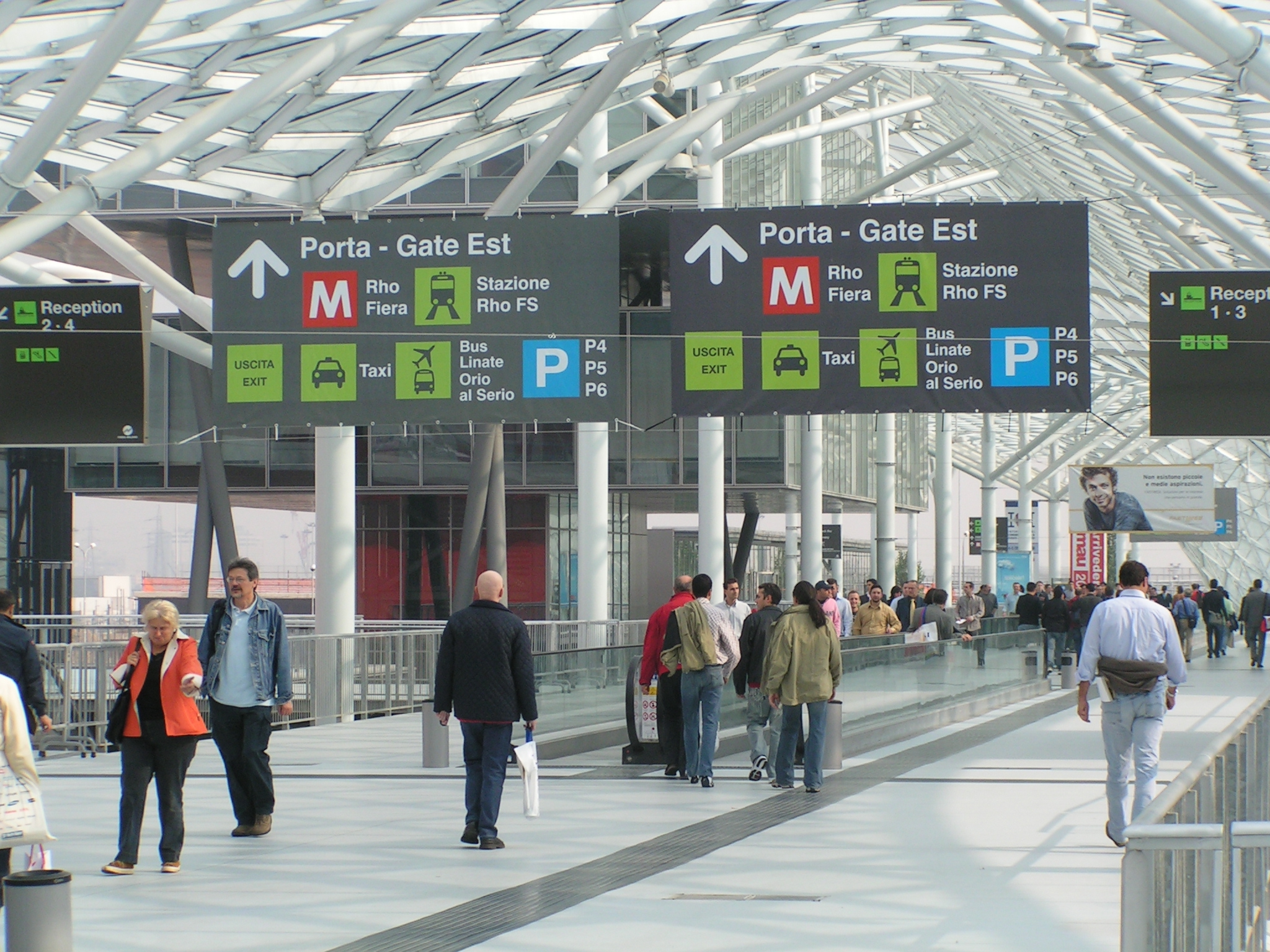
Exit to the metro station and other forms of transport is through the East Gate of FieraMilano

== See also ==
- Rho Fiera railway station
