= Bande Nere (Milan Metro) =

Milan metro station

Coordinates: 45.4617°N 9.1372°E

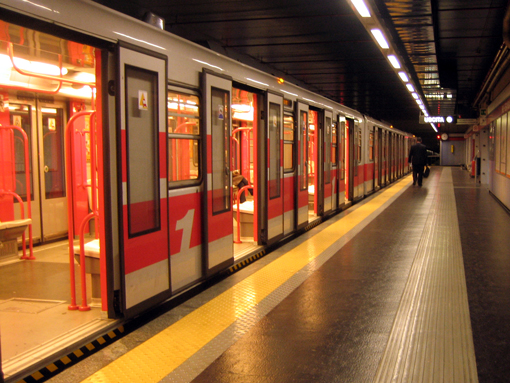

General information
- Location: Piazza Giovanni dalle Bande Nere, Milan
- Owner: Azienda Trasporti Milanesi
- Platforms: 2
- Tracks: 2

Construction
- Structure type: Underground
- Accessible: yes

Other information
- Fare zone: STIBM: Mi1

History
- Opened: 18 April 1975; 51 years ago

Services
Preceding station	Milan Metro	Following station
Primaticcio towards Bisceglie	Line 1	Gambara towards Sesto 1º Maggio
Location
- Location within Milan Location within Lombardy Location within Northern Italy Location within Italy

Bande Nere is a station on Line 1 of the Milan Metro in Milan, Italy. The station is underground and is located at Piazza Giovanni dalle Bande Nere.

== History ==
The station was opened on 18 April 1975 as part of the section between Gambara and Inganni. Bande Nere is part of the trunk Pagano-Bisceglie.
