= Wagner (Milan Metro) =

Milan metro station

Coordinates: 45.4681°N 9.1555°E

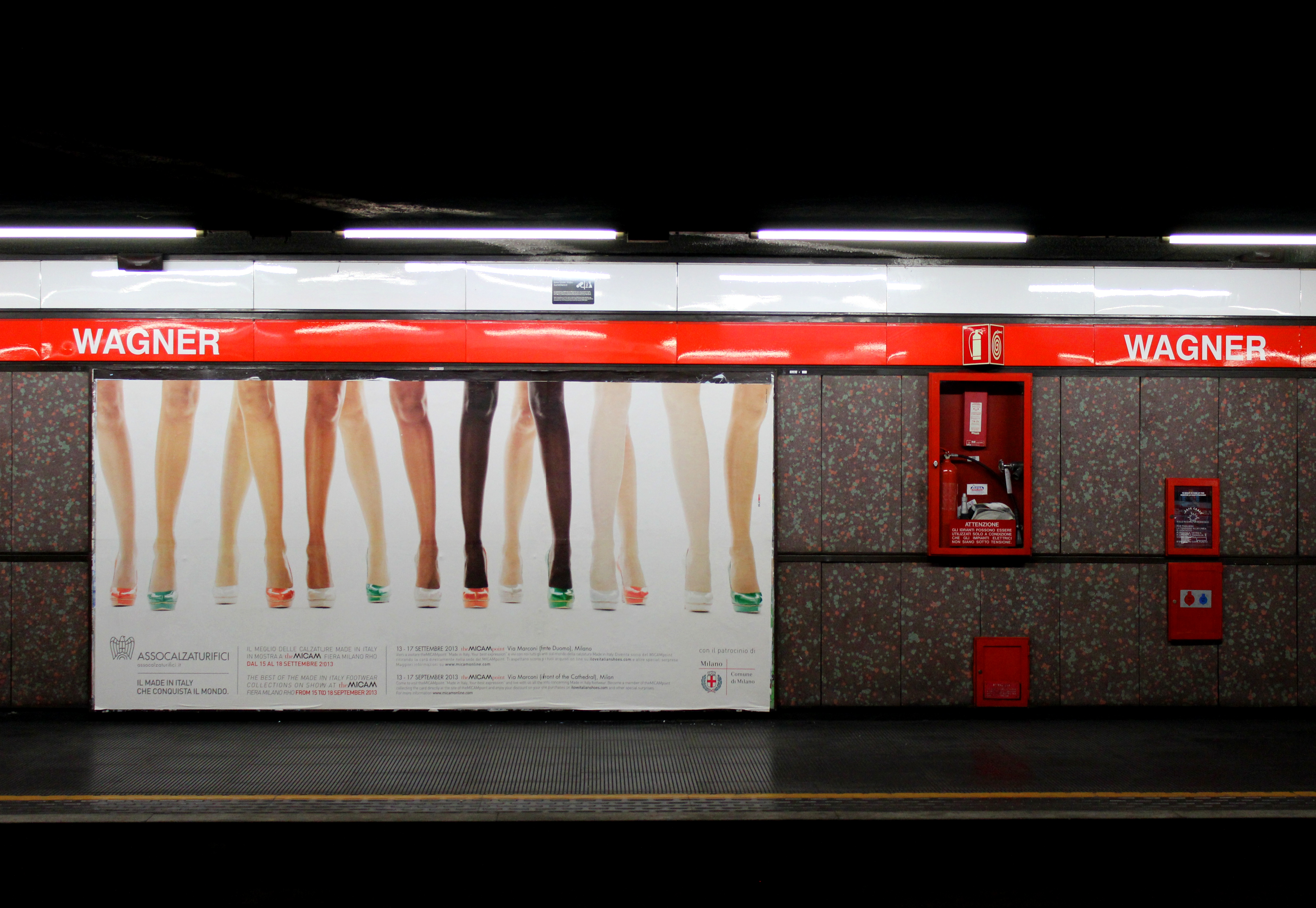

General information
- Location: Piazza Wagner, Milan
- Owner: Azienda Trasporti Milanesi
- Platforms: 2
- Tracks: 2

Construction
- Structure type: Underground

Other information
- Fare zone: STIBM: Mi1

History
- Opened: 2 April 1966; 60 years ago

Services
Preceding station	Milan Metro	Following station
De Angeli towards Bisceglie	Line 1	Pagano towards Sesto 1º Maggio
Location
- Location within Milan Location within Lombardy Location within Northern Italy Location within Italy

Wagner is a station on Line 1 of the Milan Metro in Milan, Italy. The underground station was opened in 1966 and is located at Piazza Wagner.

== History ==
The station was opened on 2 April 1966 as part of the section between Pagano and Gambara.

== See also ==
- Piazza Piemonte
