= De Angeli (Milan Metro) =

Milan metro station

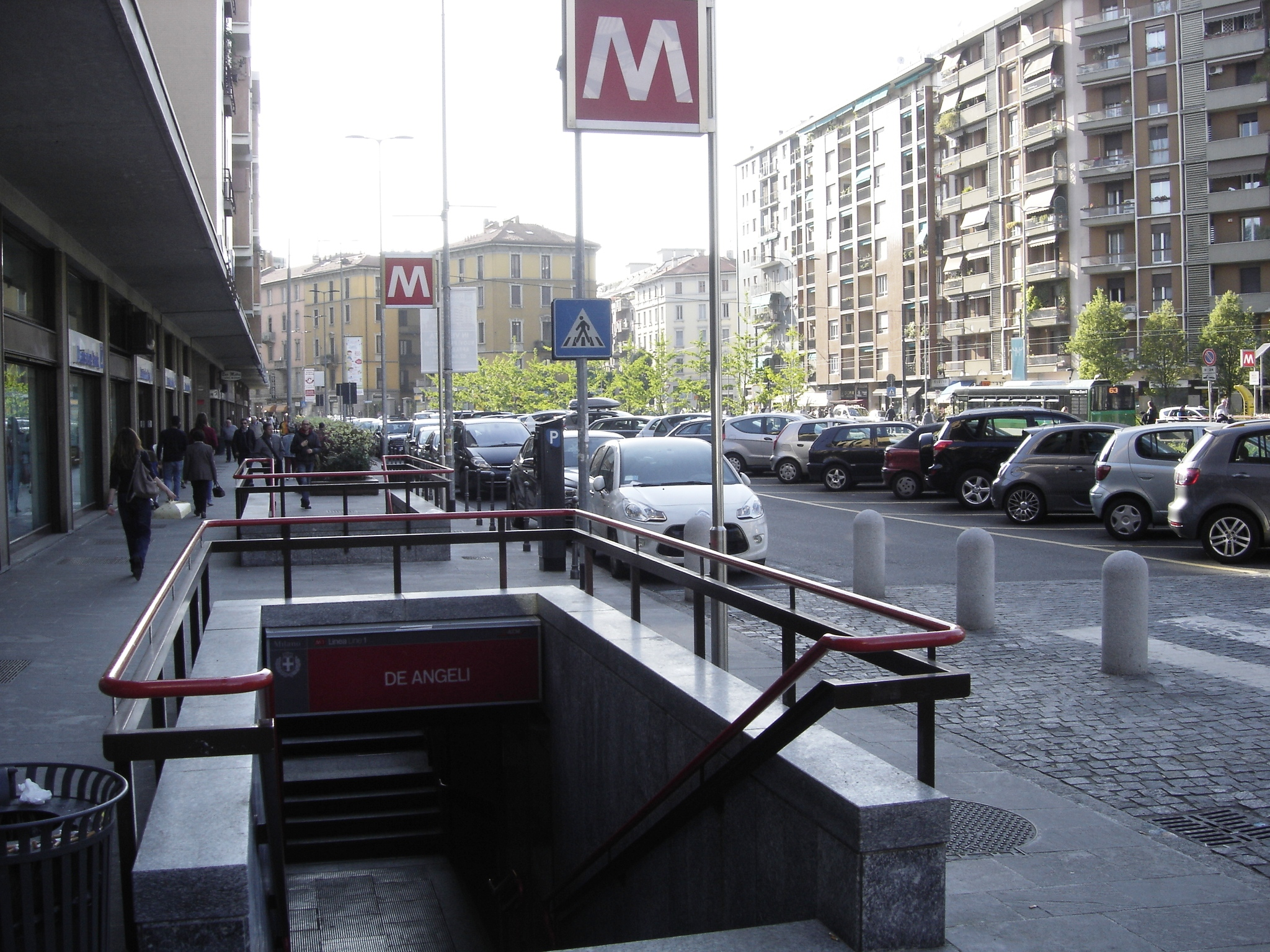

General information
- Location: Piazza Ernesto De Angeli, Milan
- Coordinates: 45°28′00″N 9°08′58″E
- Owner: Azienda Trasporti Milanesi
- Platforms: 2
- Tracks: 2

Construction
- Structure type: Underground

Other information
- Fare zone: STIBM: Mi1

History
- Opened: 2 April 1966; 60 years ago

Services
Preceding station	Milan Metro	Following station
Gambara towards Bisceglie	Line 1	Wagner towards Sesto 1º Maggio
Location
- Location within Milan Location within Lombardy Location within Northern Italy Location within Italy

De Angeli is a station on Line 1 of the Milan Metro in Milan, Italy. The underground station was opened in 1966 and is located at Piazza Ernesto De Angeli.

== History ==
The station was opened on 2 April 1966 as part of the section between Pagano and Gambara.
