= Rovereto (disambiguation) =

Rovereto is a city in Trentino, Italy

Rovereto may also refer to other places in Italy:

- Rovereto railway station, a station in Rovereto on the Brenner Railway Verona–Innsbruck line
- Rovereto (Milan Metro), a rail station in Milan
- Rovereto, a frazione in Cerignale, Emilia-Romagna
- Rovereto, a frazione in Novi di Modena, Emilia-Romagna
- Rovereto, a frazione in Ostellato, Emilia-Romagna
- Rovereto, a frazione in Credera Rubbiano, Lombardy
- Rovereto, a frazione in Gavi, Piedmont
