= Nolo =

Nolo may refer to:

- Nolo, Milan, a district in the northeast of Milan
- Nolo (publisher), formerly known as Nolo Press, a publisher of legal self-help material
- Nolo, Pennsylvania, an unincorporated community in Indiana County, in Pennsylvania, USA
- Nolo contendere, a plea that can be entered in some courts
- Non-alcoholic or low-alcoholic beverages
  - A pub that serves only such beverages, see Pub § nolo
- Hurricane Nolo, a Pacific hurricane in 2026
