= Gorla =

Gorla may refer to:

- Gorla (district of Milan), refers to a district of Milan, Italy
- Gorla (Milan Metro), metro station in Milan
- Gorla (surname), surname
- Gorla Maggiore, municipality in the province of Varese in the Italian region Lombardy
- Gorla Minore, municipality in the province of Varese in the Italian region Lombardy
