= Crescenzago =

Crescenzago Crescenzagh (Lombard)
- Quartiere of Milan
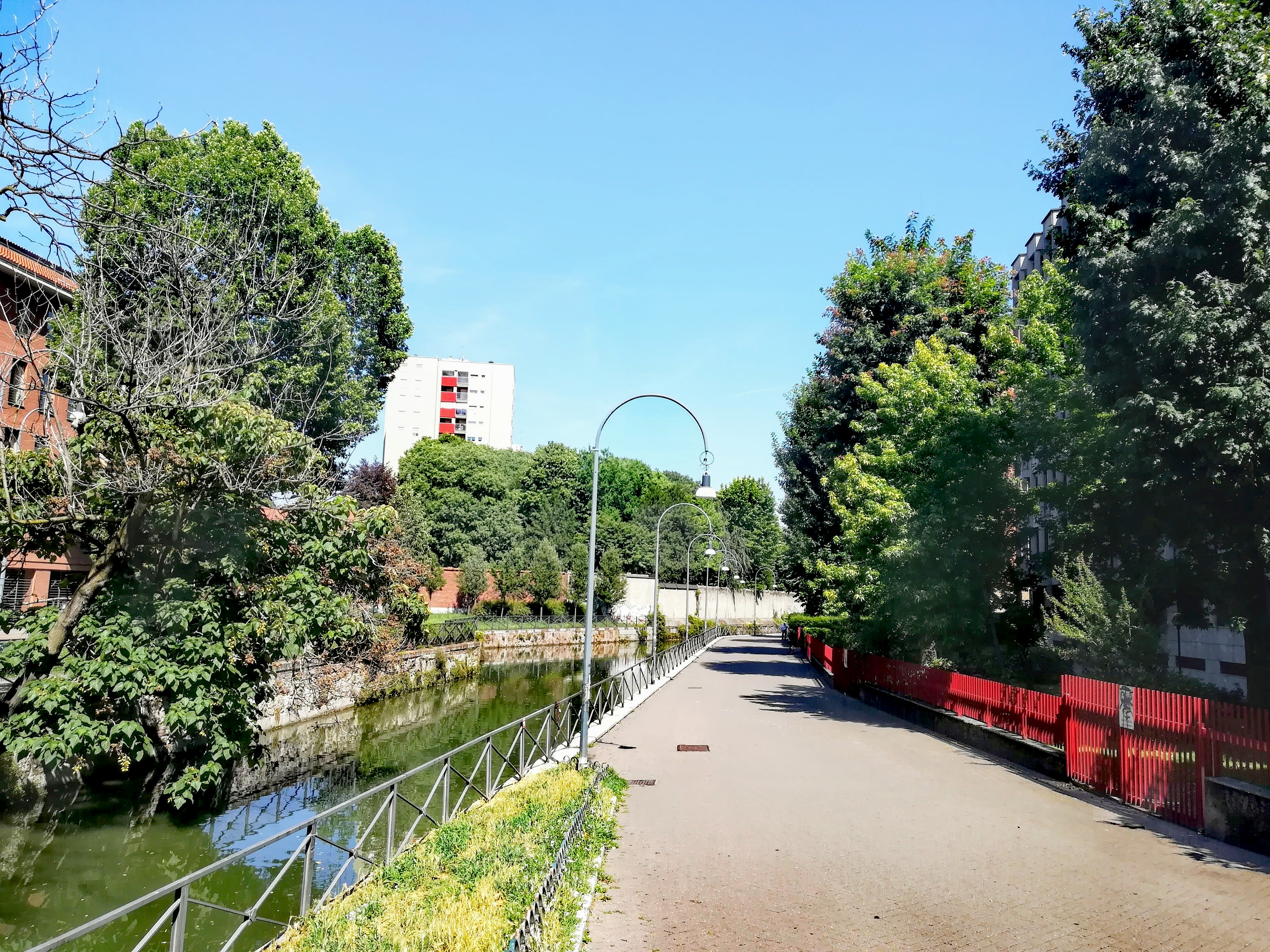
- View of the Naviglio della Martesana towards Crescenzago.

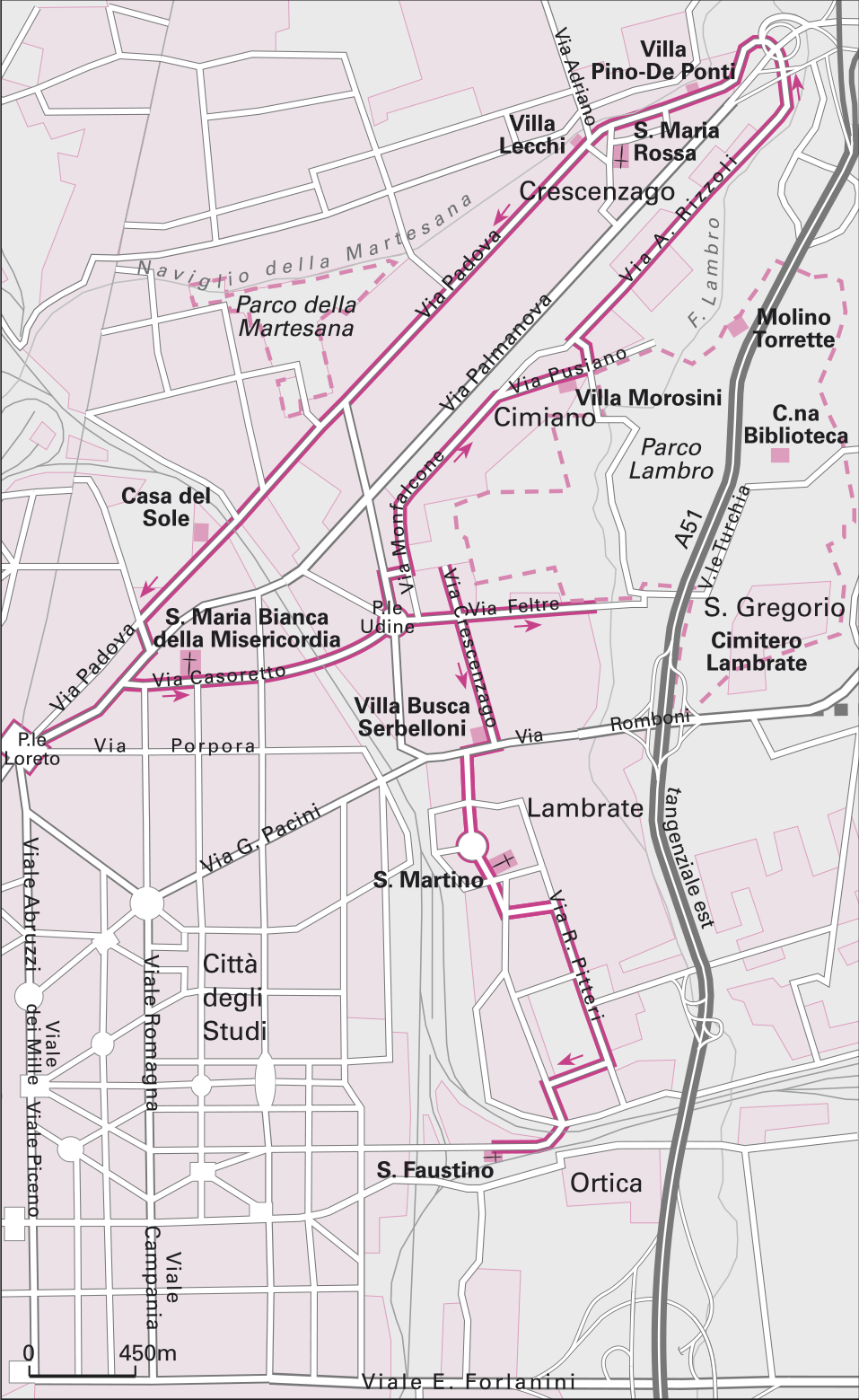
- Map of the neighborhoods of Milan: Lambrate, Ortica, and Crescenzago.
- Coordinates: 45°30′34″N 9°14′51″E
- Country: Italy
- Region: Lombardy
- Province: Milan
- Comune: Milan
- Zone: 2
- Time zone: UTC+1 (CET)
  - Summer (DST): UTC+2 (CEST)

Crescenzago (Lombard: Crescenzagh [kreʃẽˈsaːk], historically Carscenzagh) is a district (quartiere) of Milan, Italy, part of the Zone 2 administrative division, north-east of the city centre. It became part of Milan in 1923; prior to that, it was an independent borgo (town). The town is traversed by the Naviglio Martesana canal. The district houses several historical buildings, most notably a 12th Century abbey and several villas from the 18th Century. It also has notable green areas, such as part of the Lambro park, as well as industrial archeological features, most notably the abandoned Ovomaltina factory.

The Milan Metro subway (Line 2) stops at Crescenzago.

== History ==
The name "Crescenzago" is supposedly of Roman origin, from latin Crescentii ager ("Crescentius' field"). In the Middle Ages it mostly consisted in the abbey of Santa Maria Rossa (founded in 1140). It was also the main access point to Milan for travellers coming from Venice. In the 18th Century, several large villas were built in Crescenzago to serve as country residences for rich Milanese families.

Crescenzago was an independent comune until 1923, when it became part of Milan.
