= Piazza Piemonte =

- {{{other_names}}}
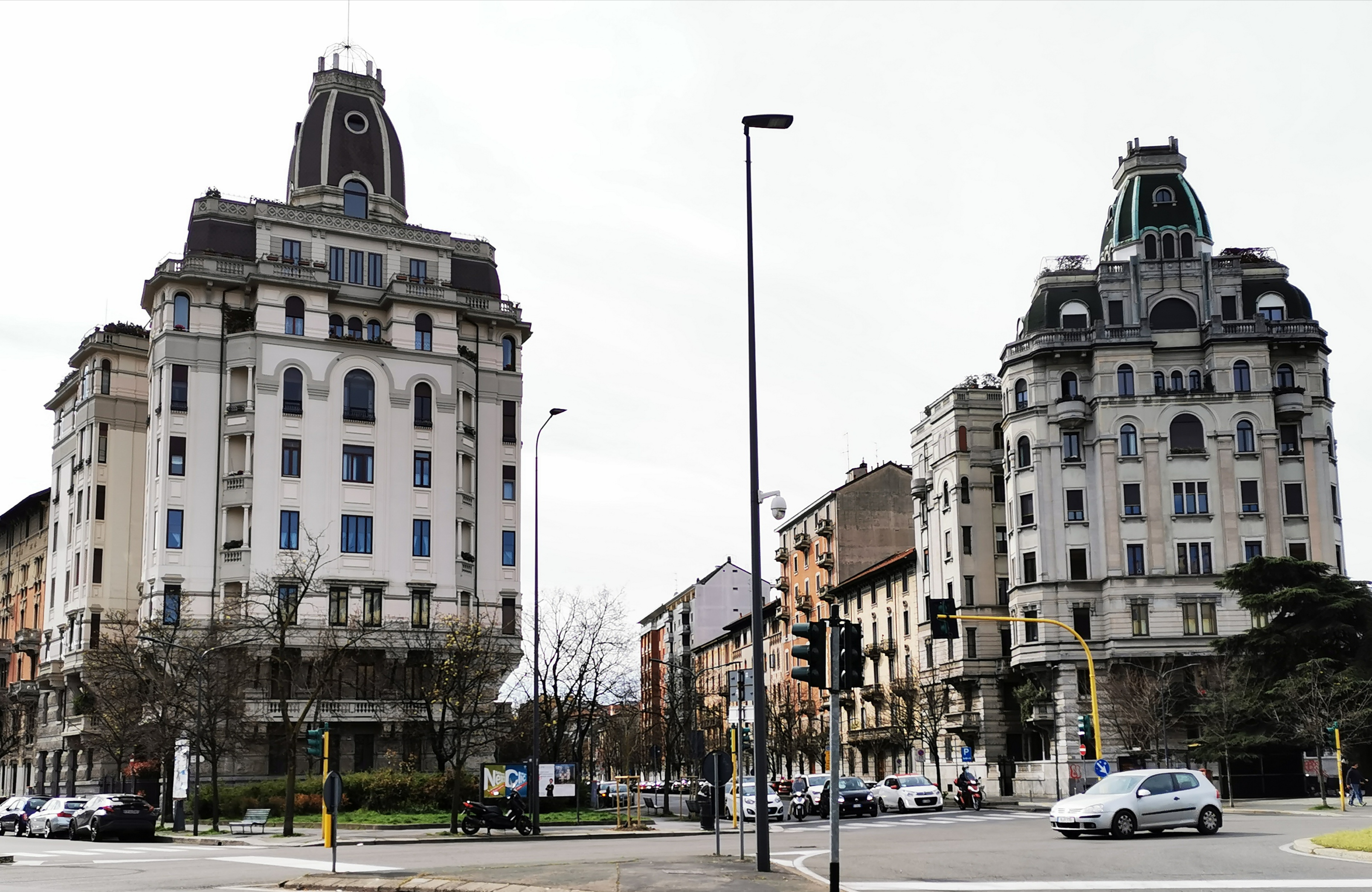
- Location: Milan, Italy
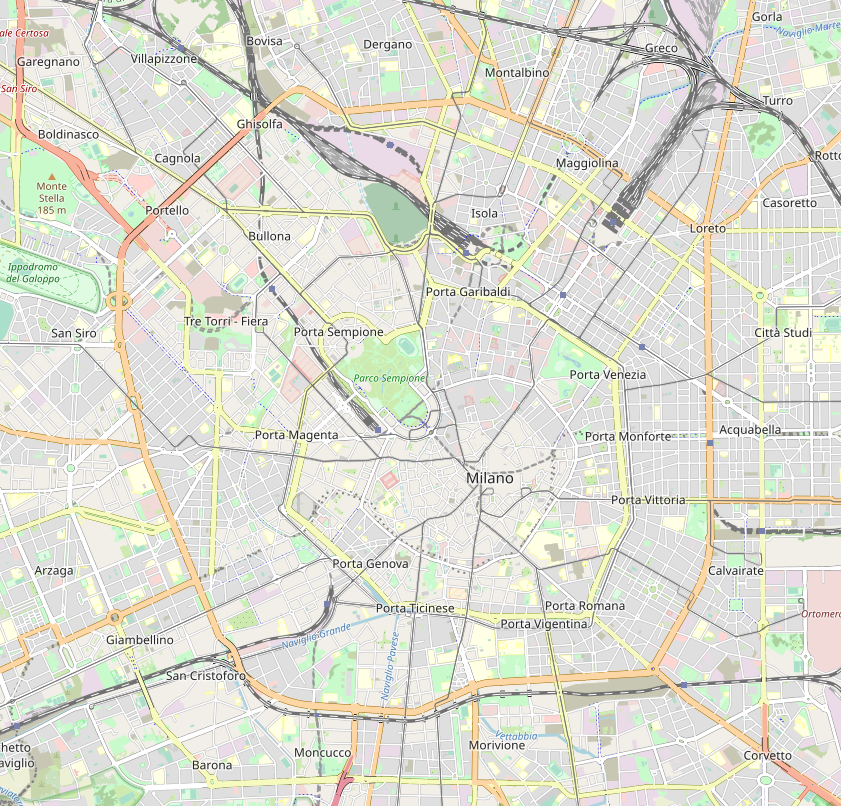
- Location within Milan
- Coordinates: 45.46645°N 9.15513°E

The Piazza Piemonte (i.e. Piedmont Square) is a square in Milan, Italy. It is served by the nearby Wagner station of Milan Metro Line 1.
