= Nolo, Milan =

District in Milan, Italy

Nolo
- district of Milan
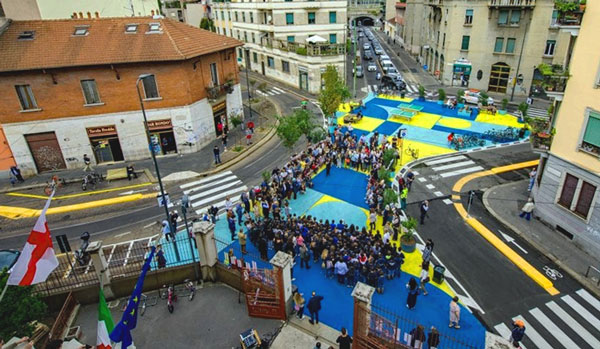
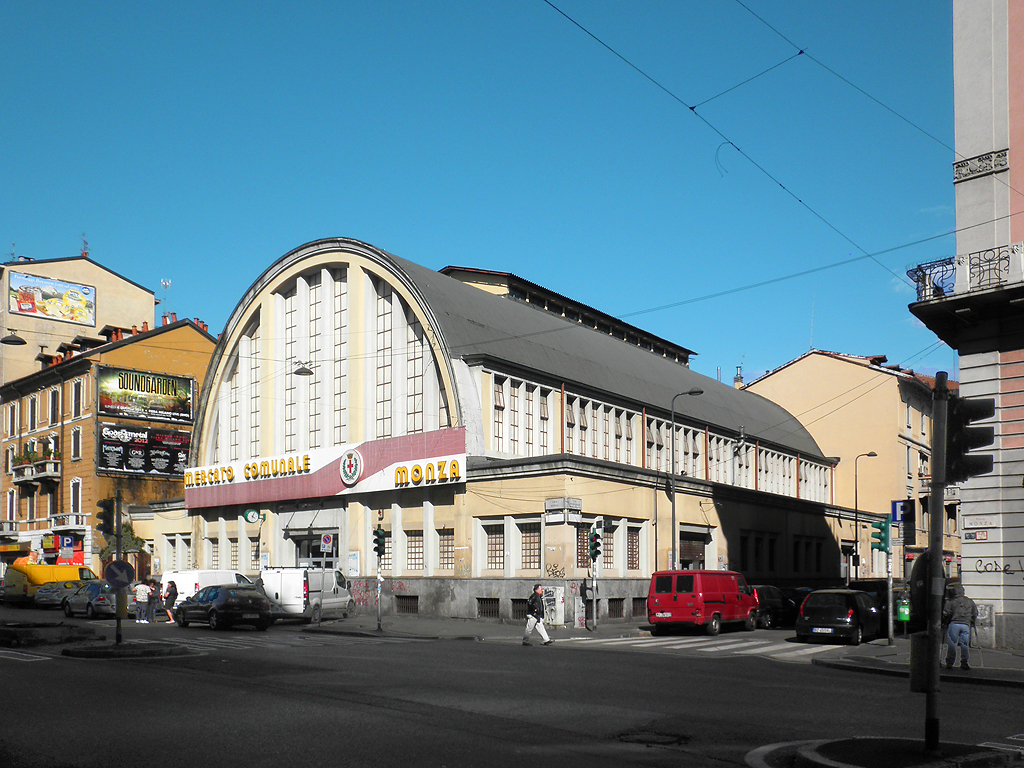
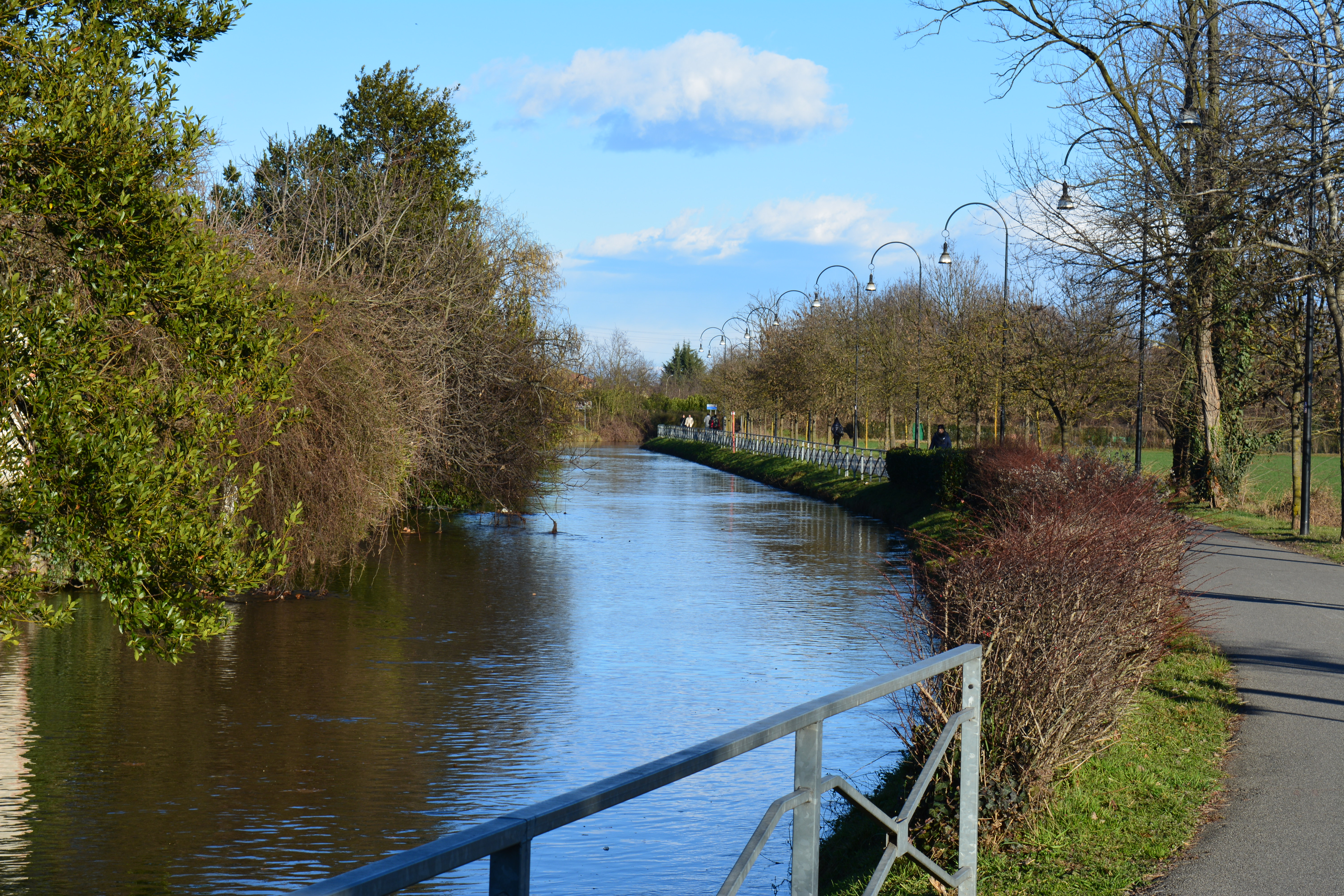
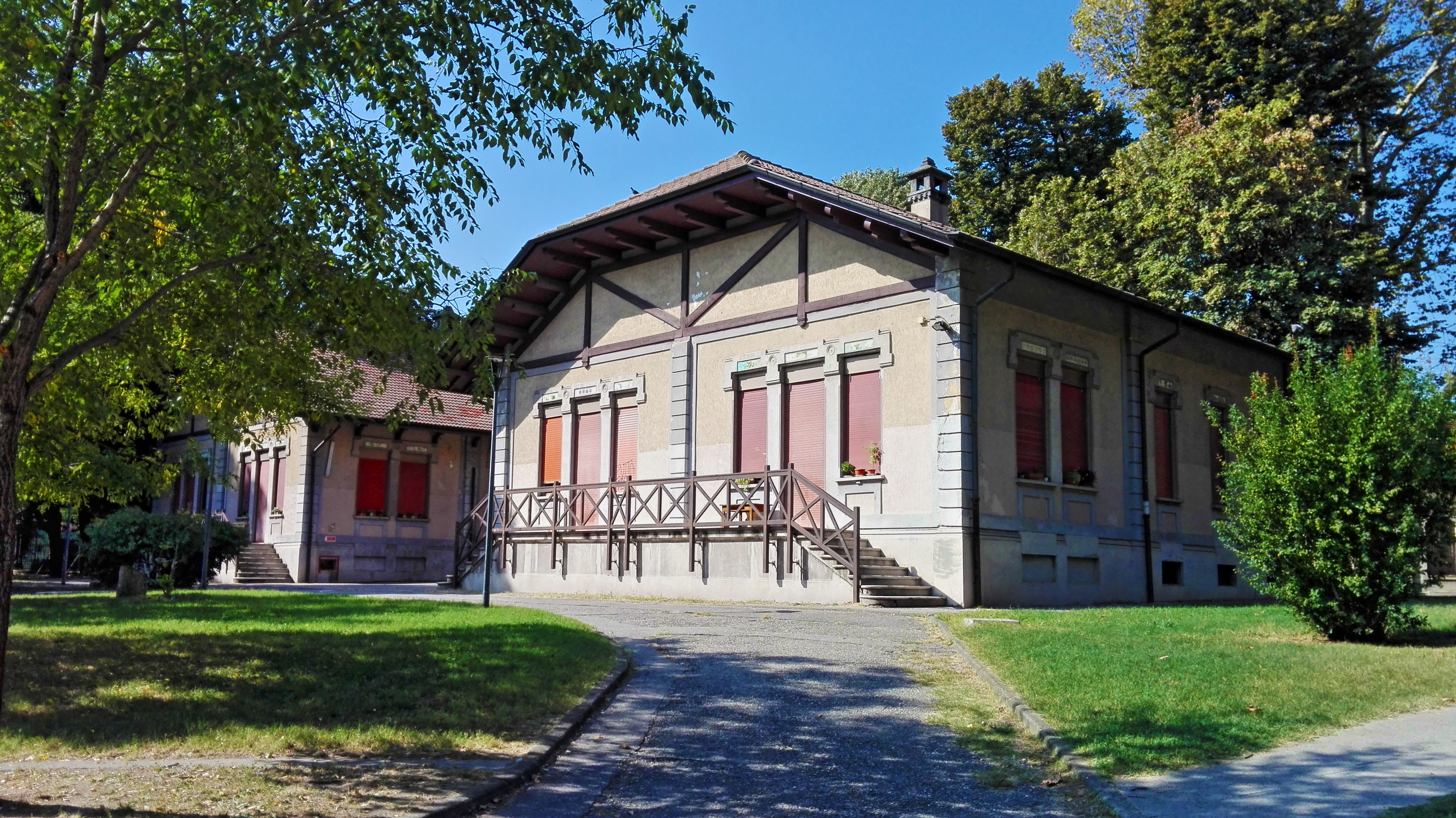
- Top from left: Piazza Spoleto; Piazza Morbegno; Viale Monza covered Market; Naviglio Martesana; Parco Trotter;
- Interactive map of Nolo
- Country: Italy
- Region: Lombardy
- Province: Milan
- Comune: Milan
- Demonym: Nolers
- Time zone: UTC+1 (CET)
  - Summer (DST): UTC+2 (CEST)

Nolo is a district of Milan located in the Zone 2 of the city, in the northeast area.

This area of Milan, located on the north of Piazzale Loreto, has historically been following the demographic development of the city, being populated to satisfy the need for housing due to the migratory waves of those looking for work. As the city of Milan expanded its borders, buildings and residential areas increased along the northern route. Peripheral area, just outside the Milan outer ring road, after World War II it developed demographically, hosting workers from mostly southern Italy and later, with numerous migratory flows of the 21st century multiethnic communities especially in via Padova, which has transformed itself becoming in the 2000s a security risk area, as well as a place of meeting and cooperation between Italians and immigrants.

The area between Piazzale Loreto and the railway, unlike other districts identified with a name, such as Turro, Gorla and Casoretto, although developing homogeneously, has never had a real name, subsequently identified as an area Pasteur or Rovereto area (from the Milan Metro stops). In 2012 the name NoLo (meaning North of Loreto) was invented by architects Francesco Cavalli, Luisa Milani and Walter Molteni, while joking about the possibility of creating a neighbourhood brand, along the lines of SoHo or Tribeca. A name then circulated by word of mouth, already in 2016 becoming an accepted label and name used for social groups, demonstrations, events, club names, until its ratification, with the approval on 14 October 2019 of the PGT (Government Plan of the Territory for Milan 2030) by the Municipality of Milan.
