= Gorla (surname) =

Gorla is a surname. Notable people with the surname include:

- Giorgio Gorla (born 1944), Italian sailor
- Giuseppe Gorla (1895–1970), Italian engineer and politician
- Marquise-Thérèse de Gorla (1633–1668), French actress and ballerina

== See also ==
- Gorla (disambiguation)
