= Zone 2 of Milan =

Coordinates: 45.486117°N 9.203635°E

Zona 2 di Milano Municipality 2
- Municipality of Milan
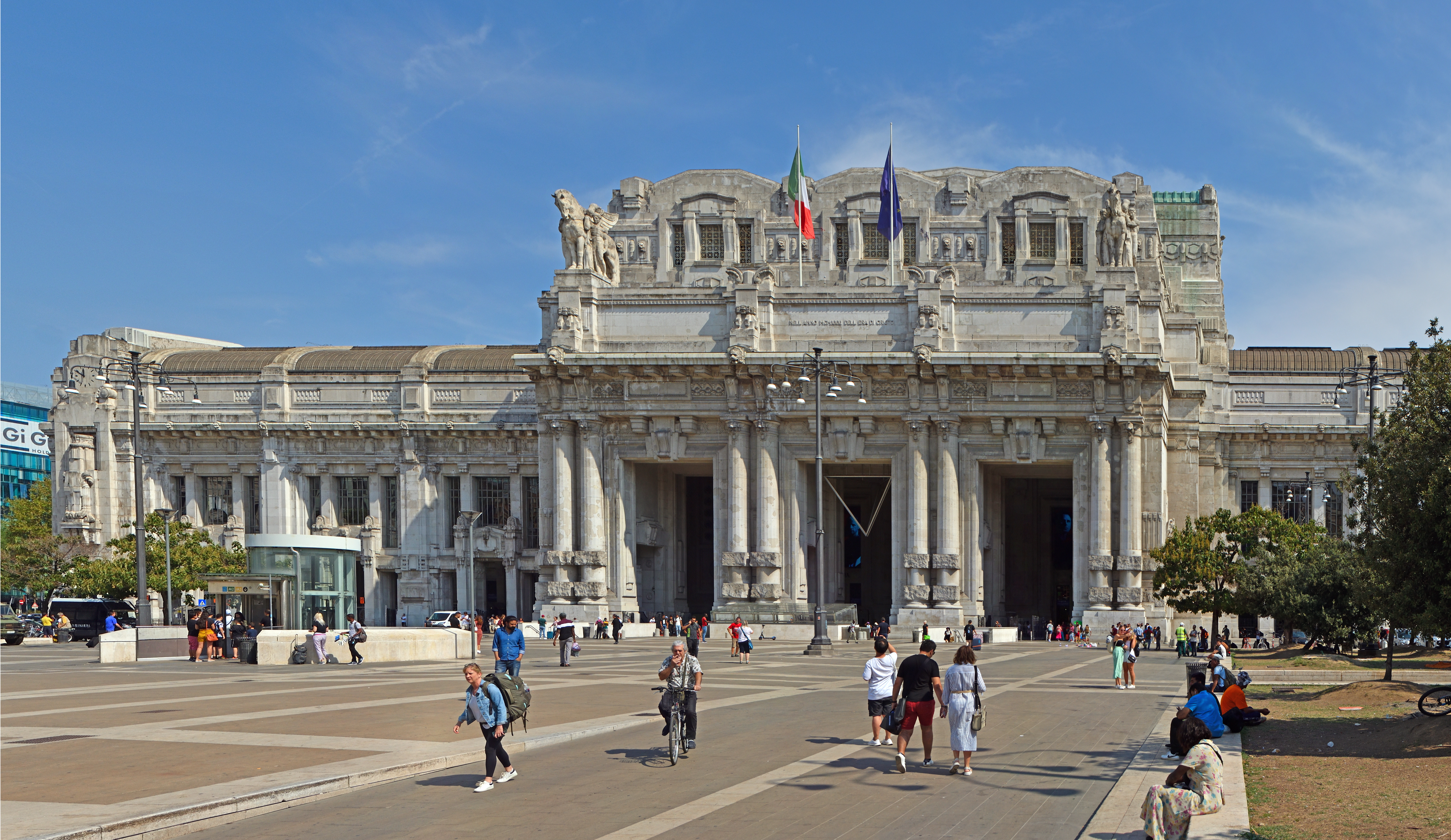
- Central railway station of Milan

- Location of Zone 2 of Milan
- Country: Italy
- Region: Lombardy
- Province: Metro City of Milan
- Comune: Milan

Government
  - President: Simone Locatelli (PD)

Area
  - Total: 4.86 sq mi (12.58 km^{2})

Population (2022)
  - Total: 160,873
  - Density: 33,750/sq mi (13,031/km^{2})
- Time zone: UTC+1 (CET)
  - Summer (DST): UTC+2 (CEST)

The Zone 2 of Milan, since 2016 officially Municipality 2 of Milan, (in Italian: Zona 2 di Milano, Municipio 2 di Milano) is one of the 9 administrative divisions of Milan, Italy.

It was officially created as an administrative subdivision during the 1980s. On 14 April 2016, in order to promote a reform on the municipal administrative decentralization, the City Council of Milan established the new Municipality 2, a new administrative body responsible for running most local services, such as schools, social services, waste collection, roads, parks, libraries and local commerce.

The zone lies on the north-eastern part of the city. The Central railway station of Milan is located in the area.

== Overview ==
The history and development of Municipality 2 have been largely influenced by its location on important routes leading from Milan to major nearby settlements such as Monza as well as towards Venice and other main cities of the Italian North-East.

The Naviglio Martesana canal, which traverses most of municipality, has been a prominent transportation means in the development of the Milanese area; between the 19th and 20th century, this role has been taken on by the railway system, which again was largely based in what is now Municipality 2. The Milano Centrale railway station, the most important railway station in Milan and one of the most important railway nodes in Italy, is located in the zone.

As a consequence of the development of the railway system, in the early 20th century the Milanese north-east quickly changed from a rural area to a mostly industrial city outskirt, experiencing a dramatic increase in population. In the mid-20th century, as factories were gradually dismantled as a consequence of the expansion of the city centre, Municipality 2 changed again, this time into a mostly residential and tertiary area. The recent evolution of the zone is also strongly influenced by the high concentration of extra-European immigrants, the highest in Milan, which has led to the development of distinctively multi-ethnic neighborhoods such as that of Viale Padova (in the Loreto district).

The complex history of Municipality 2 is witnessed by its diverse landscape, which includes such contrasting elements as modern skyscraper-punctuated districts, old-fashioned popular Milanese neighborhoods, luxury villas on the banks of the Naviglio Martesana, restored "cascine" (country houses), abandoned factories, and modern high-income residential areas.

== Subdivision ==
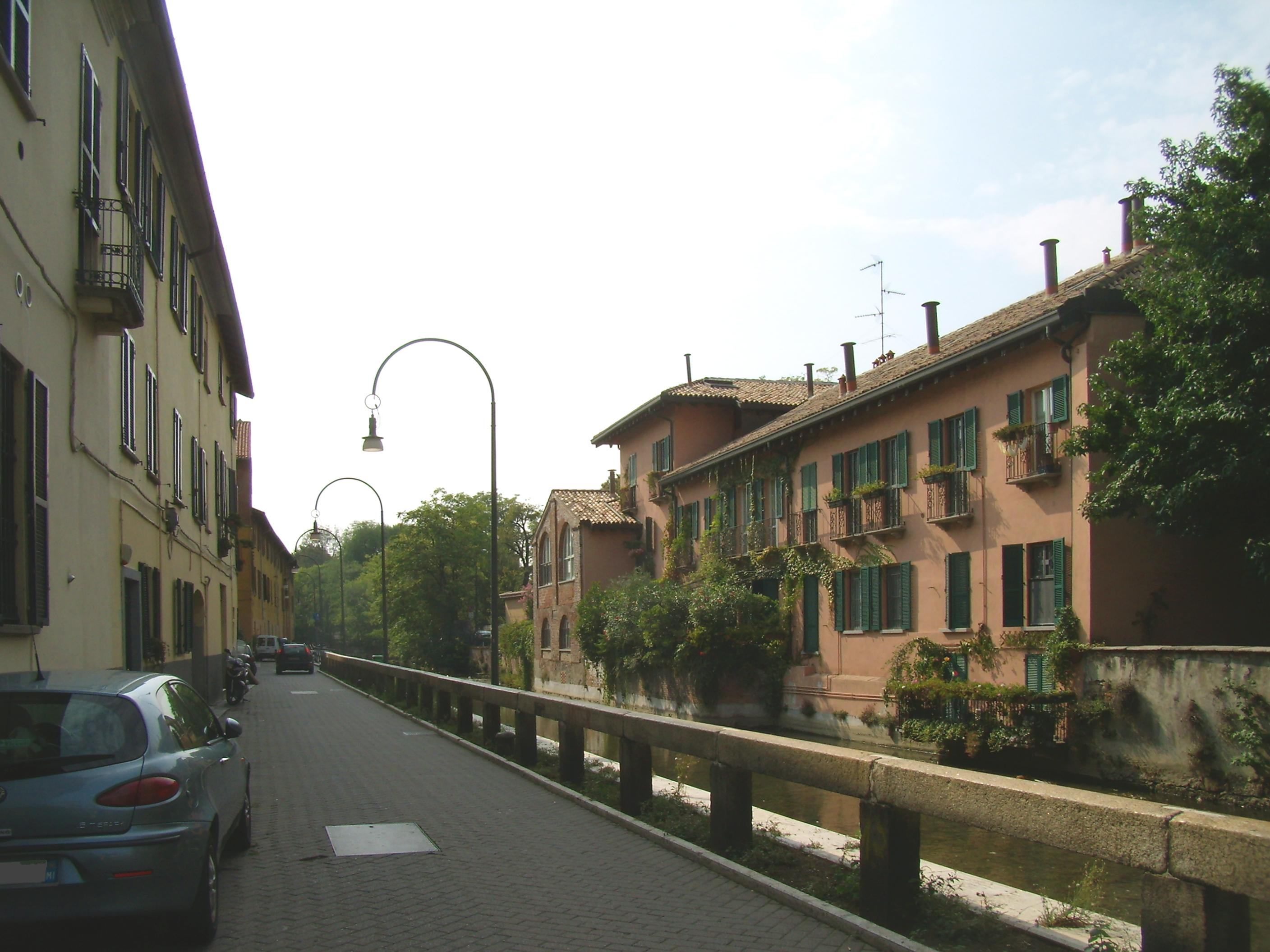
Gorla.

The zone includes the following districts:

- Crescenzago, which was an autonomous comune until it was annexed to Milan in 1923. The district houses several historical buildings, most notably a 12th-century abbey and several villas from the 18th century;
- Gorla, which was an autonomous comune until it was annexed to Milan in 1923. The district is crossed by Naviglio Martesana;
- Greco, annexed to Milan in 1923. The district still reveals its origins as a small rural town with several old "cascine" still in place or restored retaining their original overall style;
- Loreto, which takes the name of the main square of the district. It was the place where Benito Mussolini's body was publicly displayed in April 1945, hung upside down from the roof of an Esso petrol station;
- Precotto, autonomous comune annexed to Milan in 1923;
- Nolo, located north of Loreto. The district hosts workers from mostly southern Italy and since the early 1900s, with numerous migratory flows, multiethnic communities especially in via Padova. In 2012 the name "NoLo" was invented by architects Francesco Cavalli, Luisa Milani and Walter Molteni, while joking about the possibility of creating a neighborhood brand;
- Turro, a former industrial area annexed to Milan in 1918;
- Maggiolina (also known as "Villaggio dei Giornalisti", literally "Journalists' Village");
- Mandello;
- Mirabello;
- Ponte Seveso;
- Adriano.

As noted, many of these districts were independent comuni up until the first decades of the 20th century, before being annexed to Milan. This is reflected, amongst other things, in the fact that many of them are evidently structured as small towns rather than as typical metropolitan area.

== Government ==
The area has its own local authority called Consiglio di Municipio (Municipal Council), composed by the President and 30 members directly elected by citizens every five years. The council is responsible for most local services, such as schools, social services, waste collection, roads, parks, libraries and local commerce in the area, and manages funds (if any) provided by the city government for specific purposes, such as those intended to guarantee the right to education for poorer families.

The President is Simone Locatelli (PD), elected on 3-4 October 2021.

Here is the current composition of the Municipal Council after 2021 municipal election:

Alliance or political party	Members		Composition
Alliance or political party	2021–2026		Composition
Centre-left (PD-EV)	18	18 / 30	
Centre-right (FI-L-FdI)	12	12 / 30	

Here is a full lists of the directly elected Presidents of Municipio since 2011:

President	Term of office		Party
Mario Villa	16 May 2011	27 June 2016	PD
Samuele Piscina	27 June 2016	8 October 2021	LN
Simone Locatelli	8 October 2021	Incumbent	PD

== Transport ==
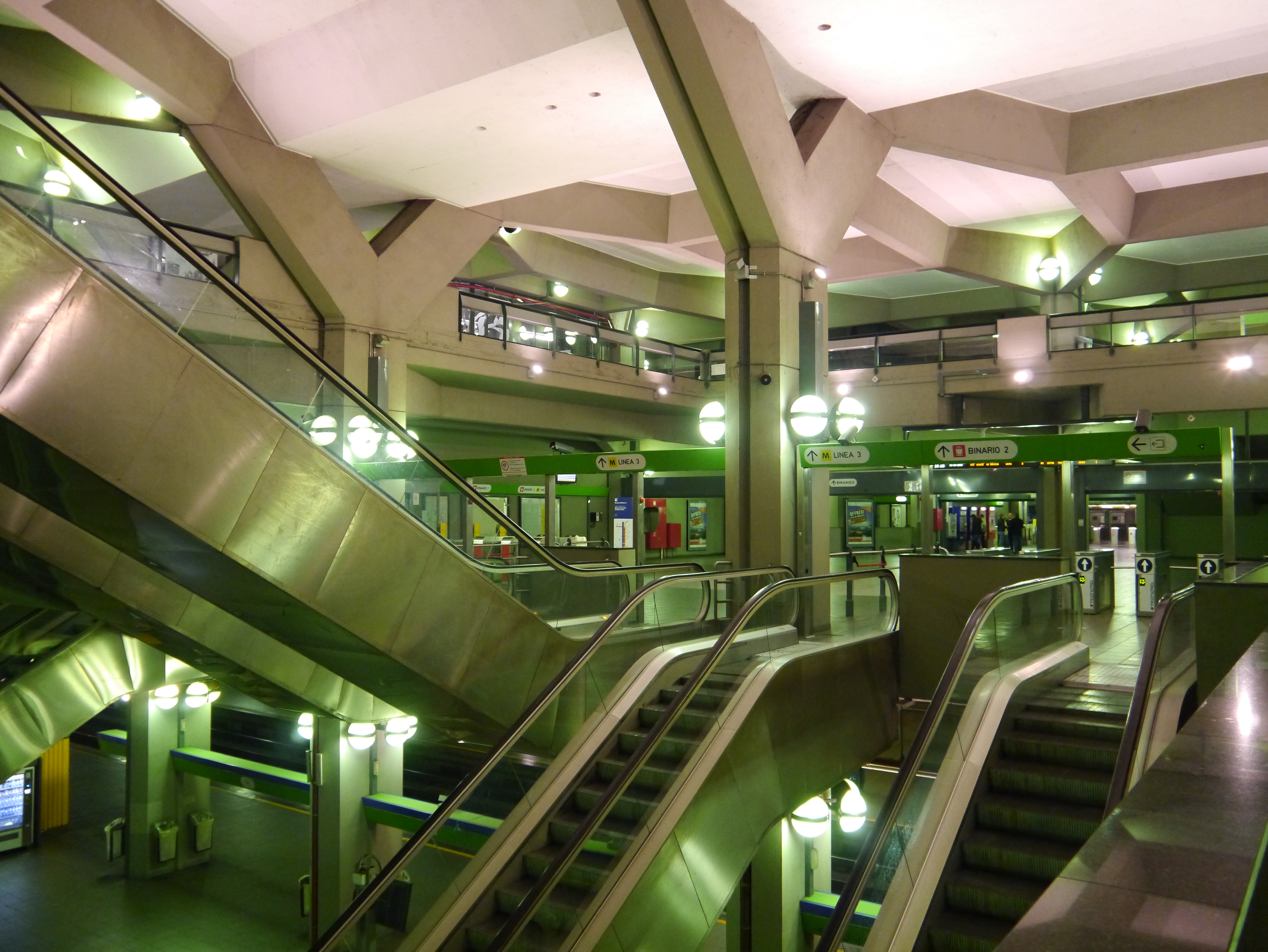
Milano Repubblica railway station.

Stations of Milan Metro in Zone 2:

- Gorla, Pasteur, Precotto, Rovereto, Sesto Marelli, Turro, Villa San Giovanni;
- Centrale FS, Crescenzago.
- Centrale FS, Repubblica, Sondrio.

Suburban railway stations in the Zone 2:

- Milano Greco Pirelli
- Milano Repubblica

== Gallery ==
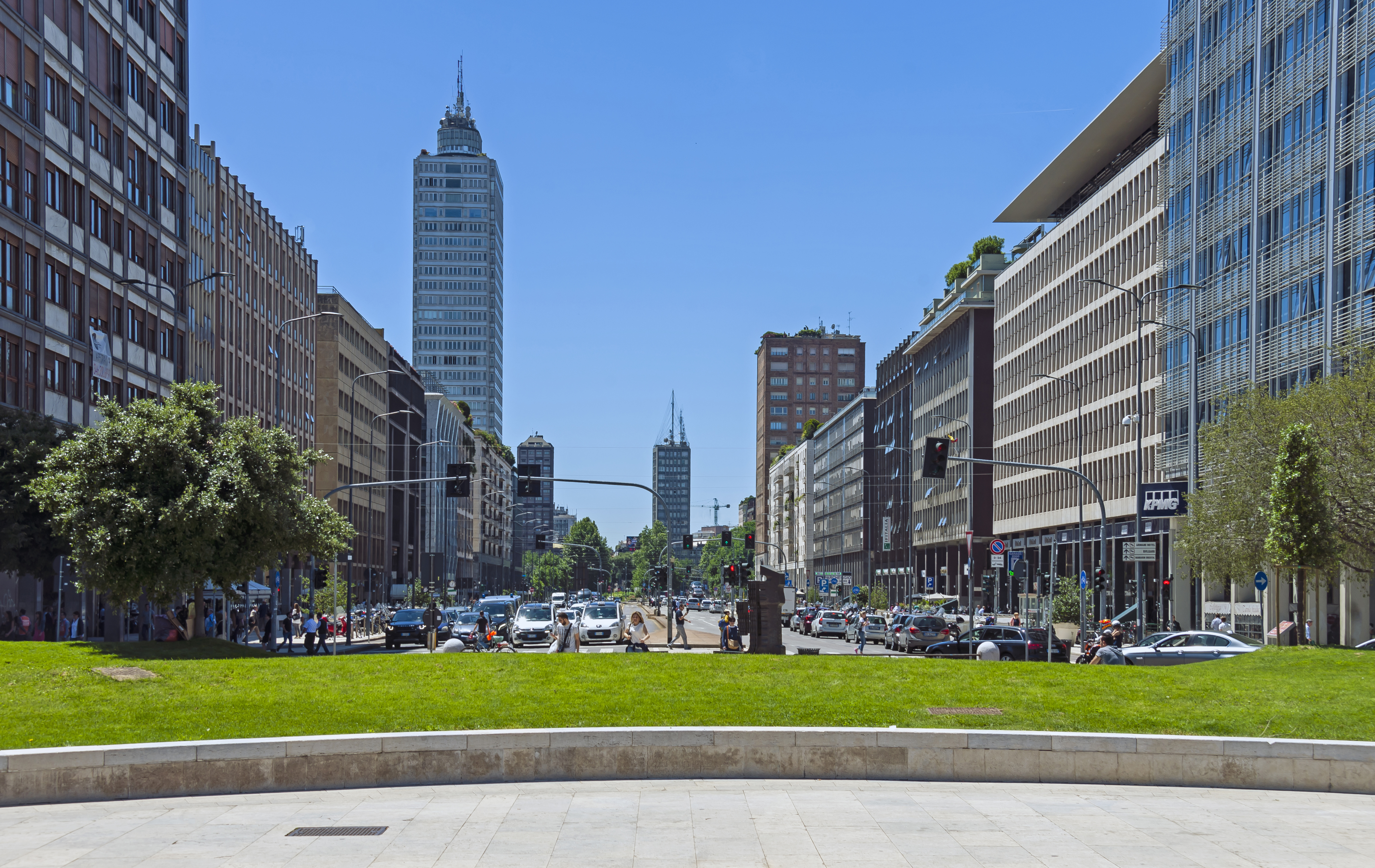
Via Vittor Pisani

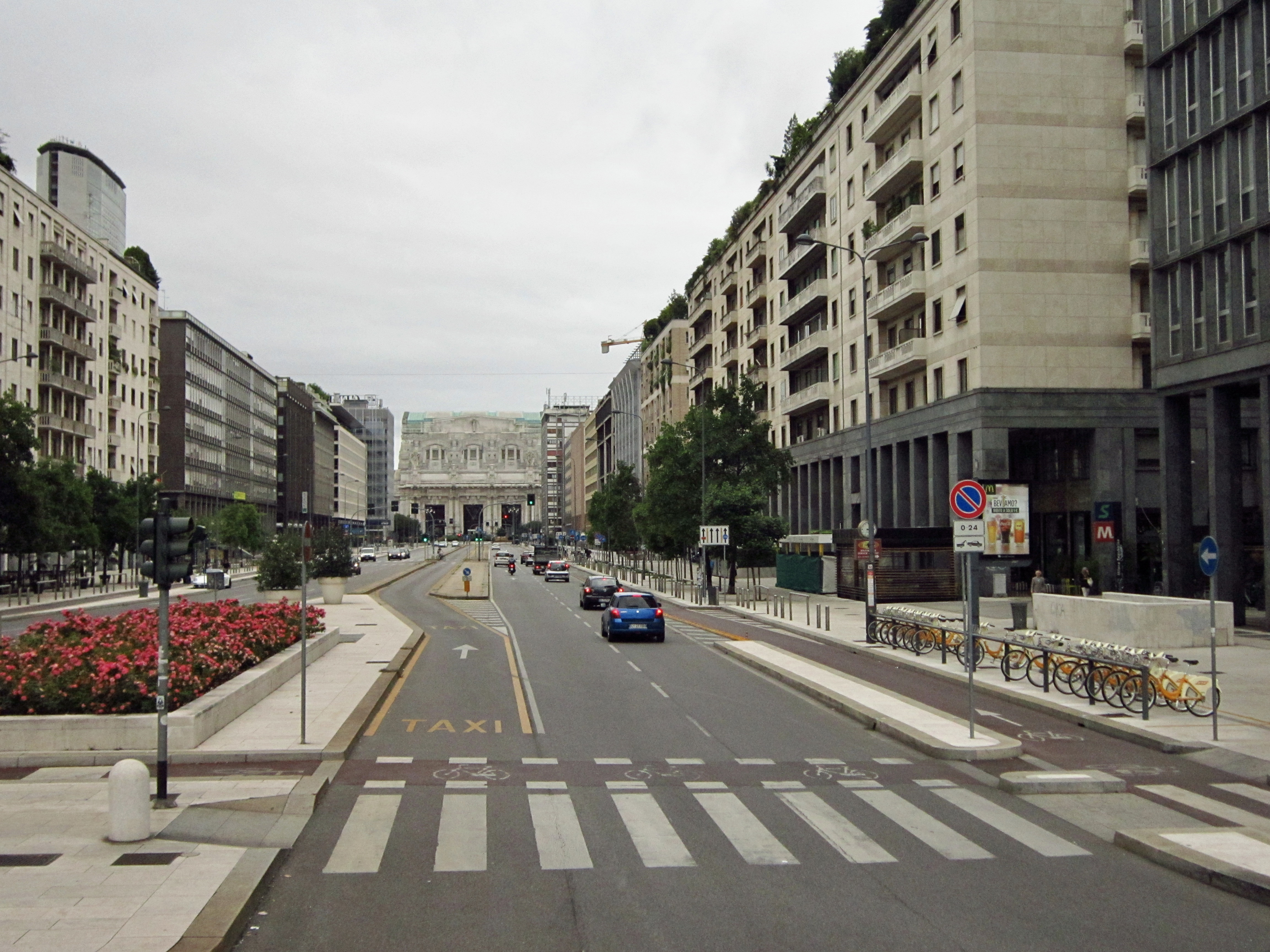
Via Vittor Pisani

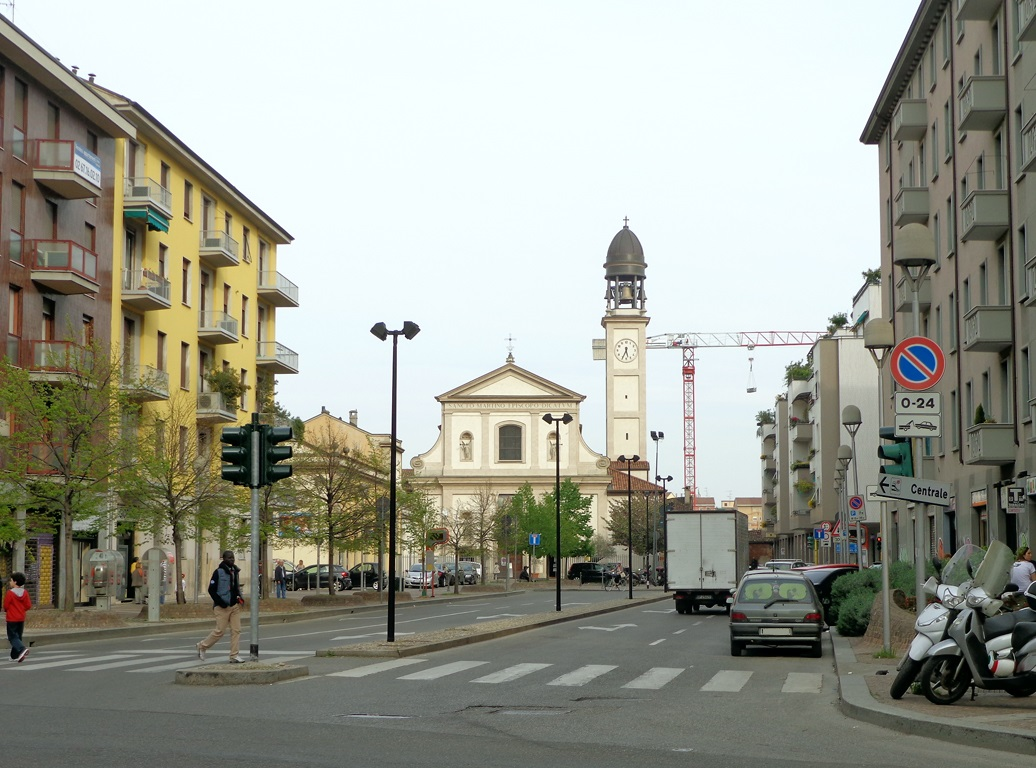
Greco

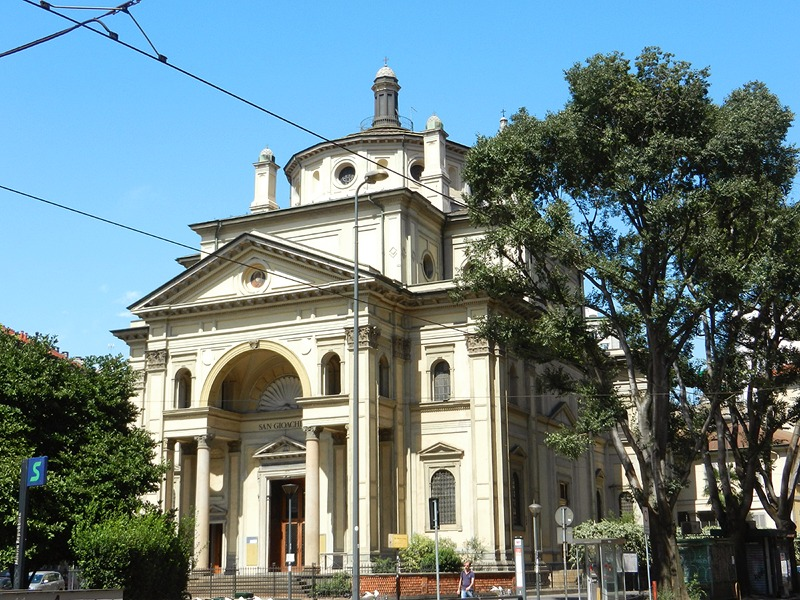
San Gioachimo

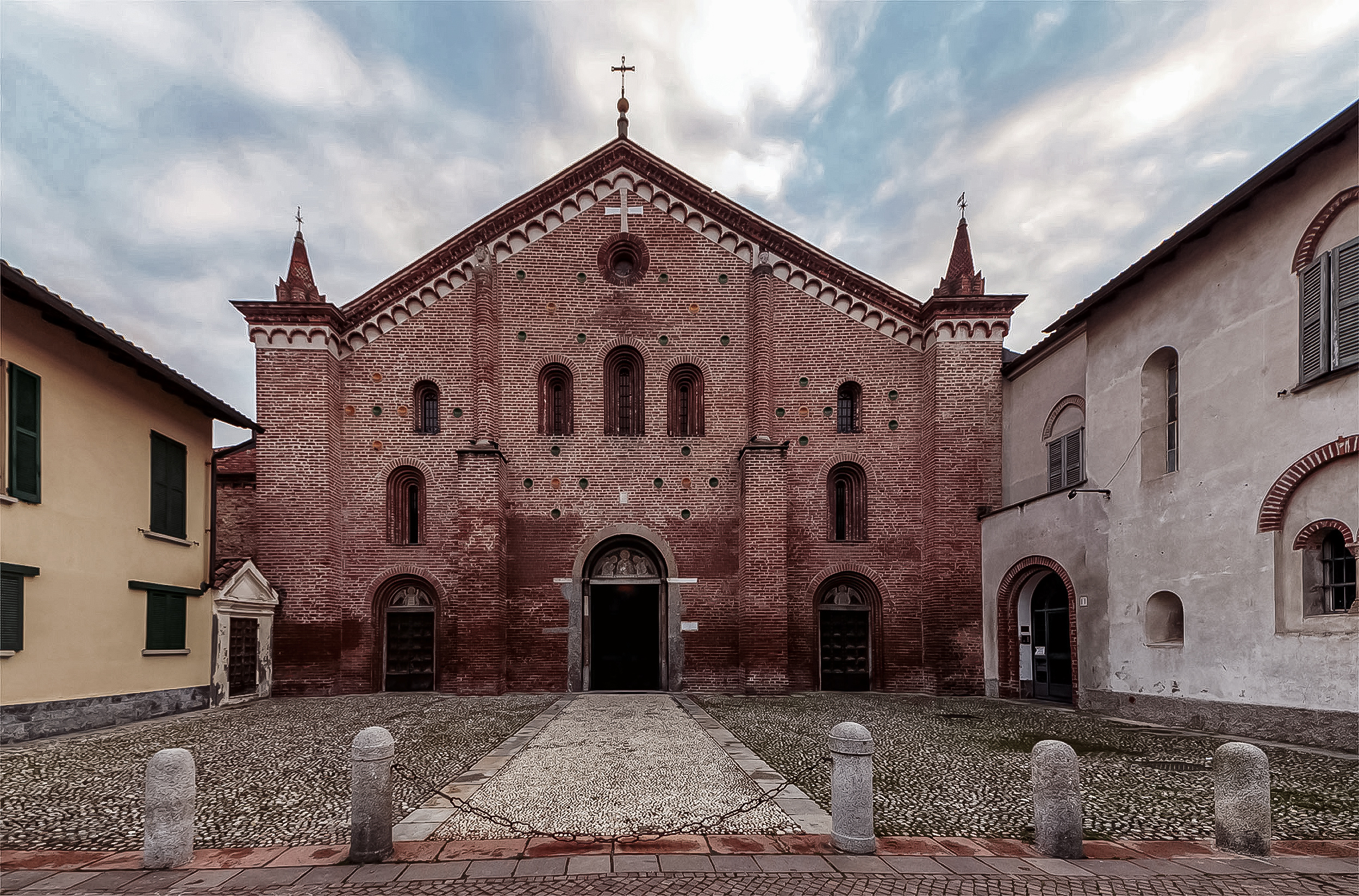
Santa Maria in Crescenzago

== Maps ==
Map of Milan Zone 2
