= Pagano (Milan Metro) =

Milan metro station

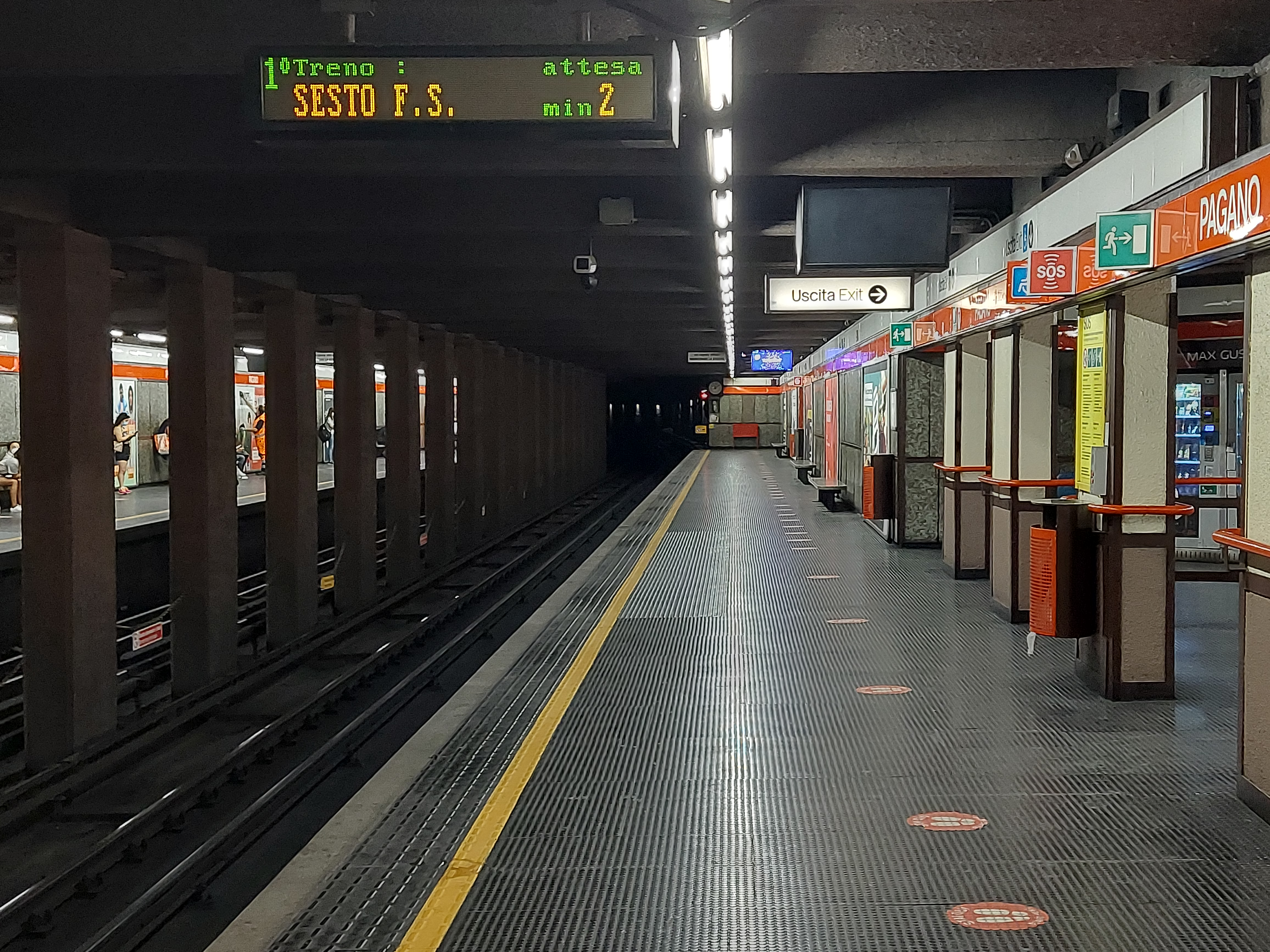

General information
- Location: Via Mario Pagano, Milan
- Coordinates: 45°28′06″N 9°09′39″E
- Owner: Azienda Trasporti Milanesi
- Platforms: 2
- Tracks: 2

Construction
- Structure type: Underground
- Accessible: yes

Other information
- Fare zone: STIBM: Mi1

History
- Opened: 1 November 1964; 61 years ago

Services
Preceding station	Milan Metro	Following station
Buonarroti towards Rho Fiera	Line 1	Conciliazione towards Sesto 1º Maggio
Wagner towards Bisceglie	Line 1	Conciliazione towards Sesto 1º Maggio
Location
- Location within Milan Location within Lombardy Location within Northern Italy Location within Italy

Pagano is a station on Line 1 of the Milan Metro in Milan, Italy. The underground station was opened on 1 November 1964 as part of the inaugural section of the Metro, between Sesto Marelli and Lotto. On 2 April 1966, a section from Pagano to Gambara was added. It is located on Via Mario Pagano. The line branches here; trains continue toward either Bisceglie or Rho Fiera.
