= Inganni (Milan Metro) =

Milan metro station

Coordinates: 45.4575°N 9.1225°E

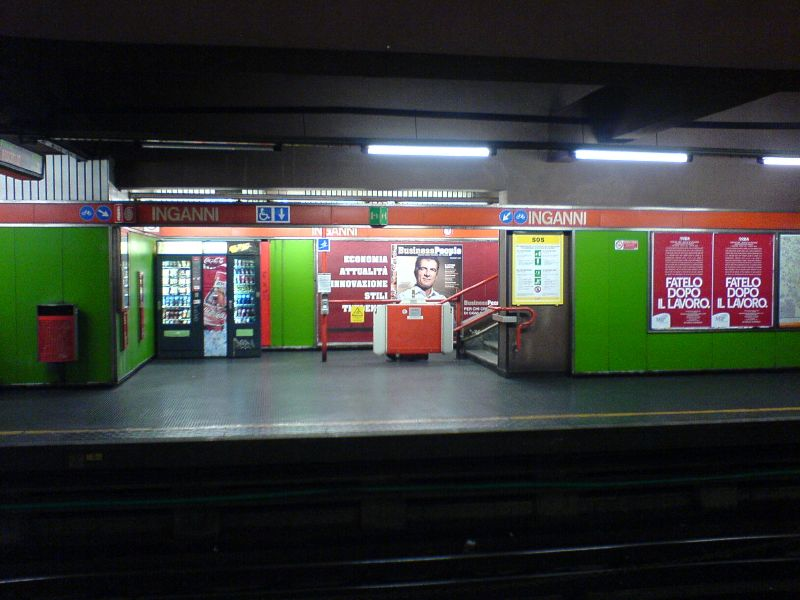

General information
- Location: Via Angelo Inganni, Milan
- Owner: Azienda Trasporti Milanesi
- Platforms: 2
- Tracks: 2

Construction
- Structure type: Underground
- Accessible: yes

Other information
- Fare zone: STIBM: Mi1

History
- Opened: 18 April 1975; 51 years ago

Services
Preceding station	Milan Metro	Following station
Bisceglie Terminus	Line 1	Primaticcio towards Sesto 1º Maggio
Location
- Location within Milan Location within Lombardy Location within Northern Italy Location within Italy

Inganni is a station on Line 1 of the Milan Metro in Milan, Italy. The station is underground and is located in Via Angelo Inganni, within the municipal area of Milan.

== History ==
The station was opened on 18 April 1975 as part of the section between Gambara and Inganni. It was the terminus of Line 1 until 21 March 1992, when Bisceglie was opened.
