= Turro (Milan) =

- Quartiere of Milan
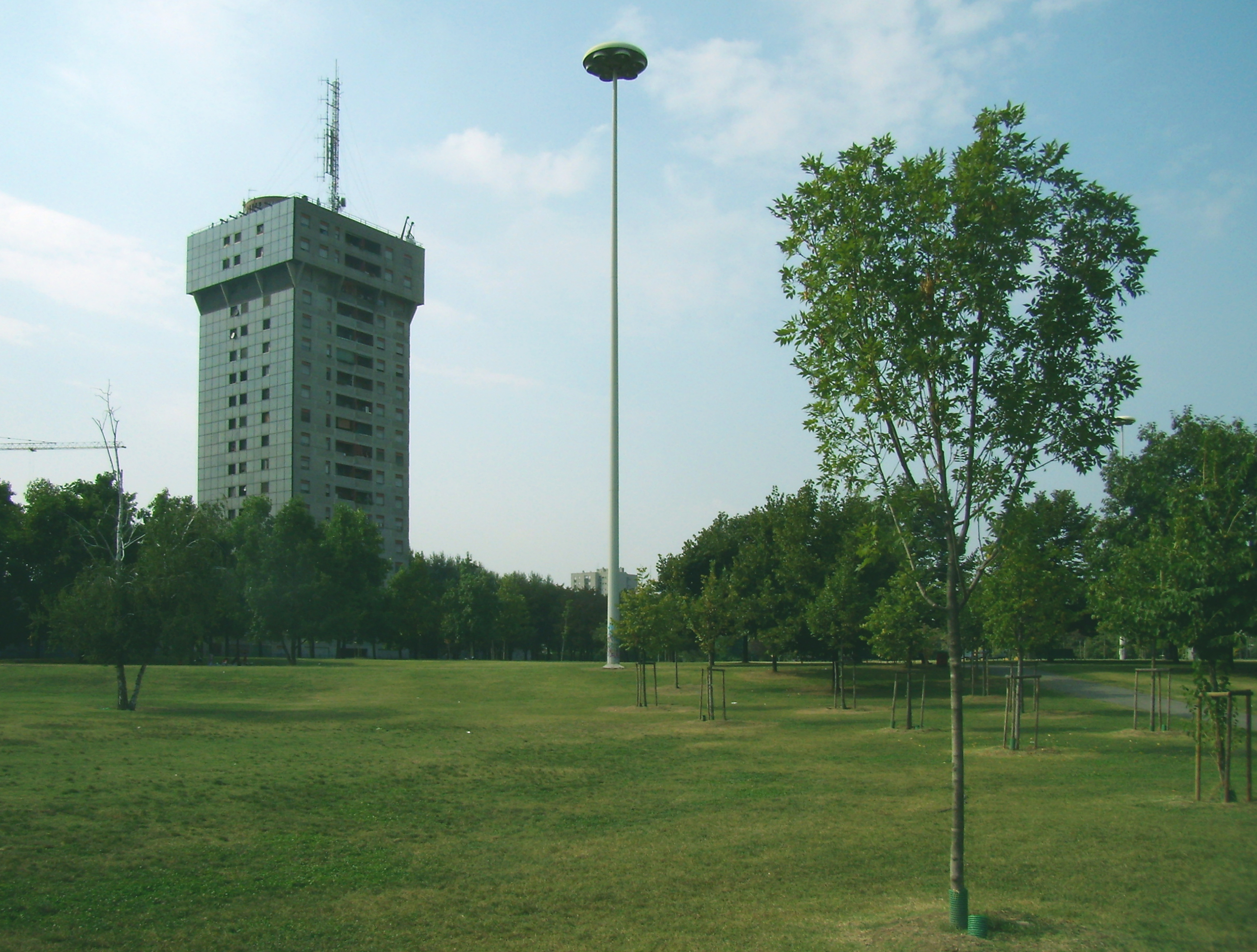
- Interactive map of Turro
- Coordinates: 45°29′53″N 9°13′32″E
- Country: Italy
- Region: Lombardy
- Province: Milan
- Comune: Milan
- Zone: 2
- Time zone: UTC+1 (CET)
  - Summer (DST): UTC+2 (CEST)

Turro is a district ("quartiere") of Milan, Italy, part of the Zone 2 administrative division, located north-east of the city centre. Before being annexed to Milan in 1918, it was an autonomous comune. The name derives from tur, the Lombard word for "tower". The Milan Metro subway (Line 1) has a stop at Turro.

== History ==
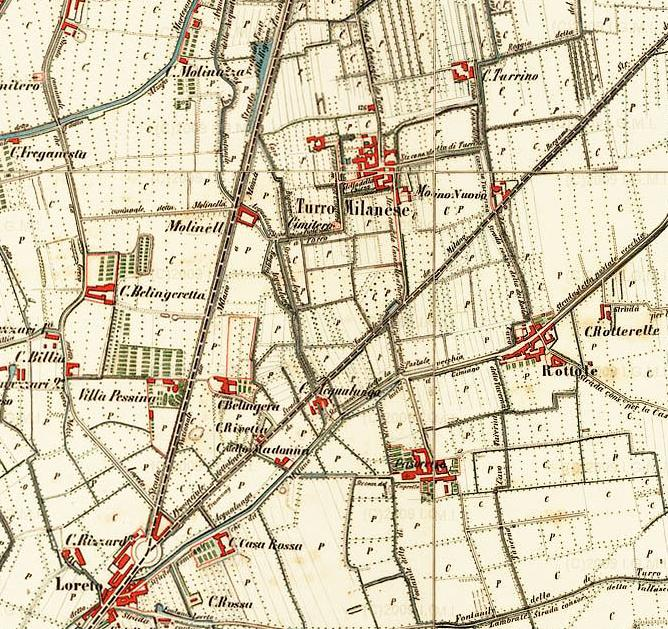
Turro in 1878

A settlement in Turro is reported at least since 1489; it probably originated around a much older tower, depicted in maps dating back to 950 and referred to as "Tauris Turris" (in Latin, "bull's tower"; hence the name "Turro"). Under the Napoleonic Empire rule, in 1808, Turro was annexed to Milan, but it returned to an autonomous status in 1816, after the foundation of the Kingdom of Lombardy–Venetia. In 1861, Turro reportedly had a population of 319, and in 1864 its name was changed to "Turro Milanese". The rural area of Turro was largely the property of noble Milanese families, such as the Melzi, the Dal Verme, the Visconti and the Parravicini.

In early 20th century, several factories were established in the area of Turro, with a consequent rapid increase in population (raising from 555 in 1901 to 7,883 in 1911 and to 20,000 in the 1930s). Still a suburb with farms in 1916, it was the subject of aerial bombing in World War I, which killed livestock. In 1918, Turro was once again, and definitively, annexed to Milan. At the same time, an "open air" school was established in Turro, on the grounds of a former horse race track.

Until the 1980s, Turro maintained its industrial character; then, as the factories were abandoned, it gradually evolved in a residential and tertiary district.

== Environment ==
Turro is traversed by the Naviglio Martesana canal, and has maintained large green areas despite its industrial and residential development. It has two main city parks, Parco Martesana (which is connected by a bike lane to the larger Parco Sempione) and Parco Trotter.

== Monuments ==
A prominent monument of the Turro district is the church of Santa Maria Assunta in Turro, one of the oldest churches in the outskirts of Milan; it was built at the beginning of the 19th century, replacing an older 16th-century church. It has a neoclassical facade and fresco decorations.
