= Gambara (Milan Metro) =

Milan metro station

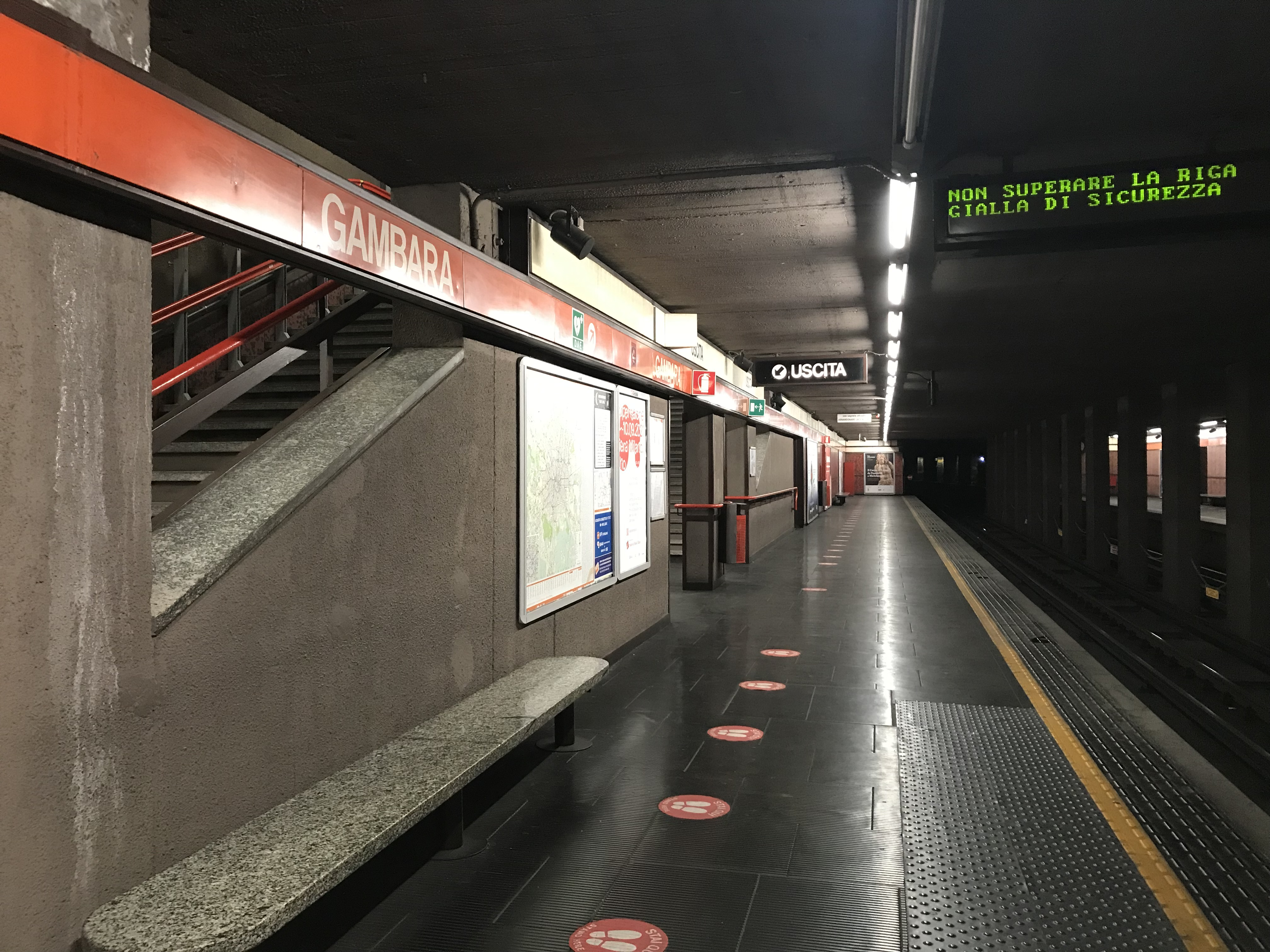

General information
- Location: Piazza Veronica Gambara, Milan
- Coordinates: 45°27′54″N 9°08′36″E
- Owner: Azienda Trasporti Milanesi
- Platforms: 2
- Tracks: 2

Construction
- Structure type: Underground
- Accessible: yes

Other information
- Fare zone: STIBM: Mi1

History
- Opened: 2 April 1966; 60 years ago

Services
| Preceding station | Milan Metro | Following station |
|---|---|---|
| Bande Nere towards Bisceglie | Line 1 | De Angeli towards Sesto 1º Maggio |
Location
- Location within Milan Location within Lombardy Location within Northern Italy Location within Italy

Gambara is a station on Line 1 of the Milan Metro in Milan, Italy. The station is underground and is located at Piazza Veronica Gambara.

== History ==
The station was opened on 2 April 1966 as the western terminus of the section between Pagano and Gambara. It remained the terminus until 18 April 1975, when the line was extended to Inganni.
