= Sesto Marelli (Milan Metro) =

Milan metro station

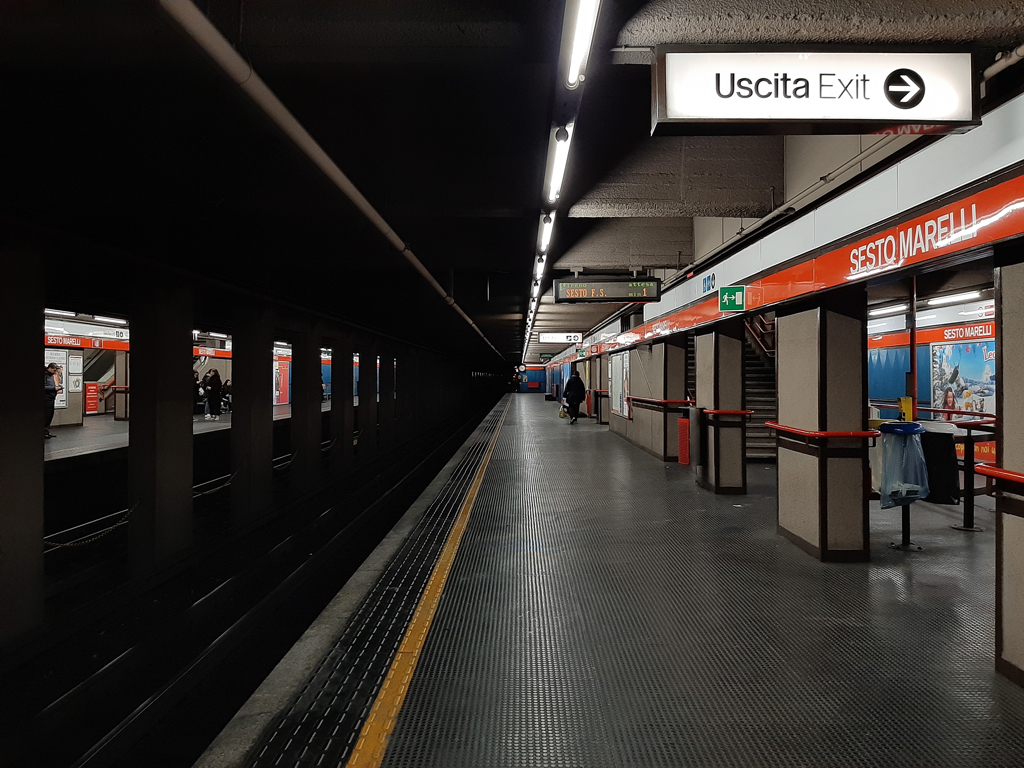

General information
- Location: Viale Ercole Marelli at Viale Tommaso Edison, Milan
- Coordinates: 45°31′25″N 9°13′41″E
- Owner: Azienda Trasporti Milanesi
- Platforms: 2
- Tracks: 2

Construction
- Structure type: Underground
- Accessible: y

Other information
- Fare zone: STIBM: Mi1 and Mi3

History
- Opened: 1 November 1964; 61 years ago

Services
Preceding station	Milan Metro	Following station
Villa San Giovanni towards Rho Fiera or Bisceglie	Line 1	Sesto Rondò towards Sesto 1º Maggio
Location
- Location within Milan Location within Lombardy Location within Northern Italy Location within Italy

Sesto Marelli is a station on Line 1 of the Milan Metro. The station was opened on 1 November 1964 as part of the inaugural section of the Metro, between Sesto Marelli and Lotto, and it was the terminus of Line 1 until 1986, when the line was extended to Sesto 1º Maggio.

The station is located at the junction between Viale Monza, Viale Tommaso Edison and Viale Ercole Marelli, near the city border with Sesto San Giovanni. However, despite the name Sesto, the station is completely part of the territory of Milan.

This is an underground station with two tracks in a single tunnel.
