= Bisceglie (Milan Metro) =

Milan metro station

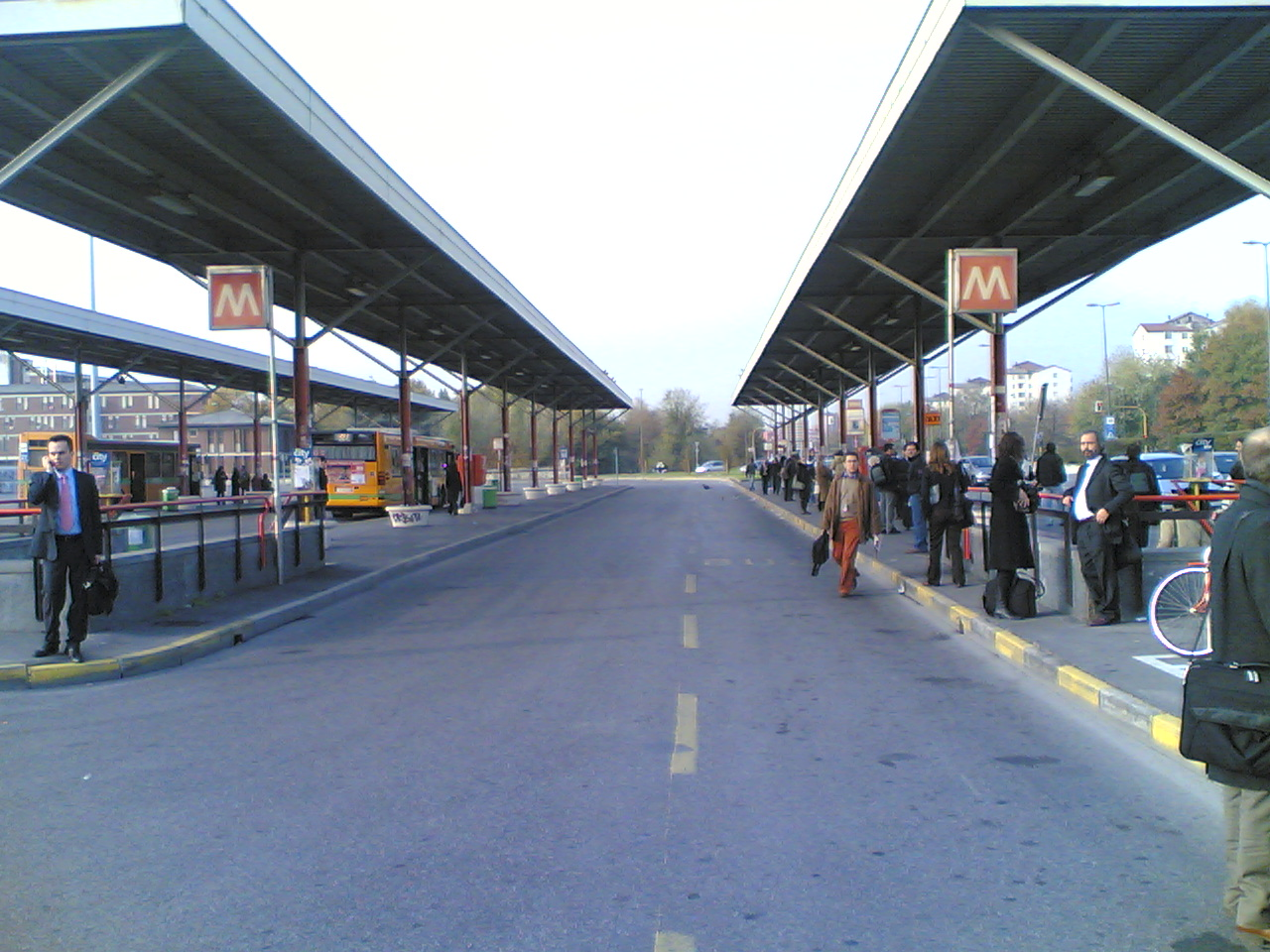

General information
- Location: Via Ferruccio Parri at Via Bisceglie, Milan
- Coordinates: 45°27′20″N 9°06′48″E
- Owner: Azienda Trasporti Milanesi
- Platforms: 2
- Tracks: 2
- Connections: ATM buses

Construction
- Structure type: Underground
- Parking: 1400 spaces
- Accessible: yes

Other information
- Fare zone: STIBM: Mi1

History
- Opened: 21 March 1992; 34 years ago

Services
Preceding station	Milan Metro	Following station
Terminus	Line 1	Inganni towards Sesto 1º Maggio
Location
- Location within Milan Location within Lombardy Location within Northern Italy Location within Italy

Bisceglie is a station on Line 1 of the Milan Metro in Milan, Italy. The station opened on 21 March 1992 as a one-station extension from Inganni. It is the western terminus of the branch. The station is located between Via Bisceglie and Via Ferruccio Parri, within the municipality of Milan.

This terminus station provides a connection to local and intercity buses operated by ATM at an adjoining bus station.
