= 4600 class =

4600 class or Class 4600 may refer to:

- ATM Class 4600, Milan articulated trams
- GWR 4600 Class, 4-4-2T steam locomotive
