= 4900 class =

4900 class or Class 4900 may refer to:

- ATM Class 4900, Milan articulated trams
- GWR 4900 Class, 4-6-0 steam locomotives
