= 4700 class =

4700 class or Class 4700 may refer to:

- ATM Class 4700, Milan articulated trams
- CP Class 4700, electric locomotives
- GWR 4700 Class, 2-8-0 steam locomotives
