= Trams in Milan =

Tram system in Milan, Italy

Milan tramway network
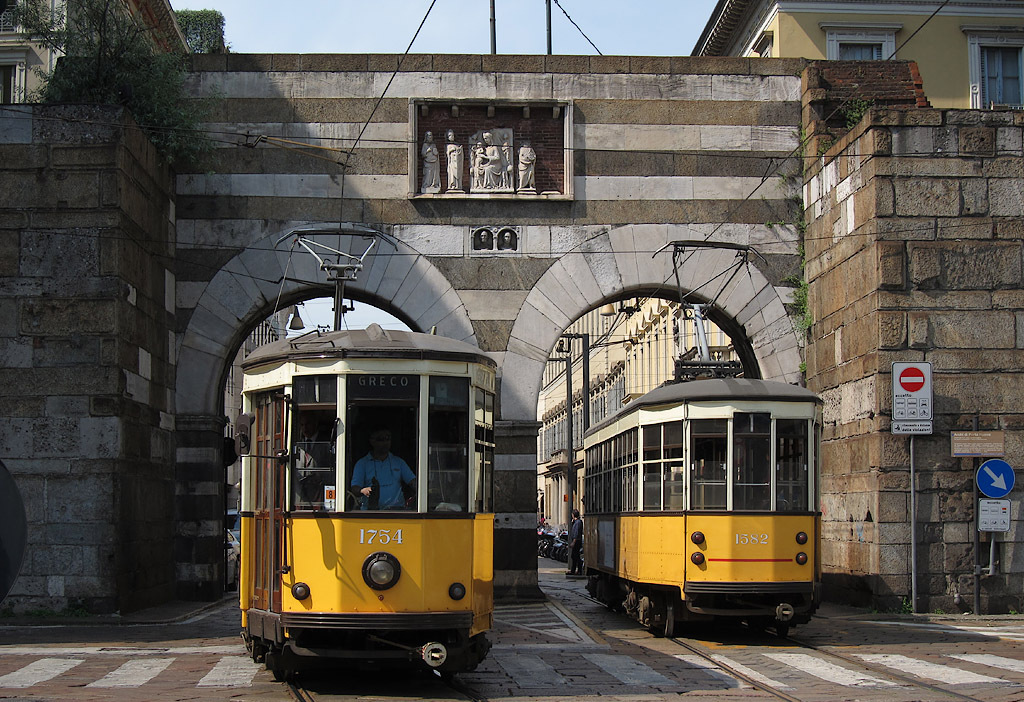
- Intersection between the line 1 tram cars 1754 and 1582 of the ATM of Milan under the Porta Nuova medieval gate. This type of historical trams are also used in San Francisco, United States

Operation
- Locale: Milan, Italy

Statistics
Horsecar era: 1881–1898
- Status: Replaced by electric trams
- Operator: SAO
- Propulsion system: Horses
- Track length (single): 10.6 km (6.6 mi)
- Track length (double): 40.3 km (25.0 mi)
- Track length (total): 50.9 km (31.6 mi)
Electric trams era: 1893–present
- Status: Still operational
- Routes: 17
- Operators: Edison (1893–1917); ATM (since 1917)
- Track gauge: 1,445 mm (4 ft 8 7/8 in) (Italian gauge)
- Propulsion system: Electricity
- Electrification: 600 V DC overhead lines
- Track length (total): 158.5 km (98.5 mi)
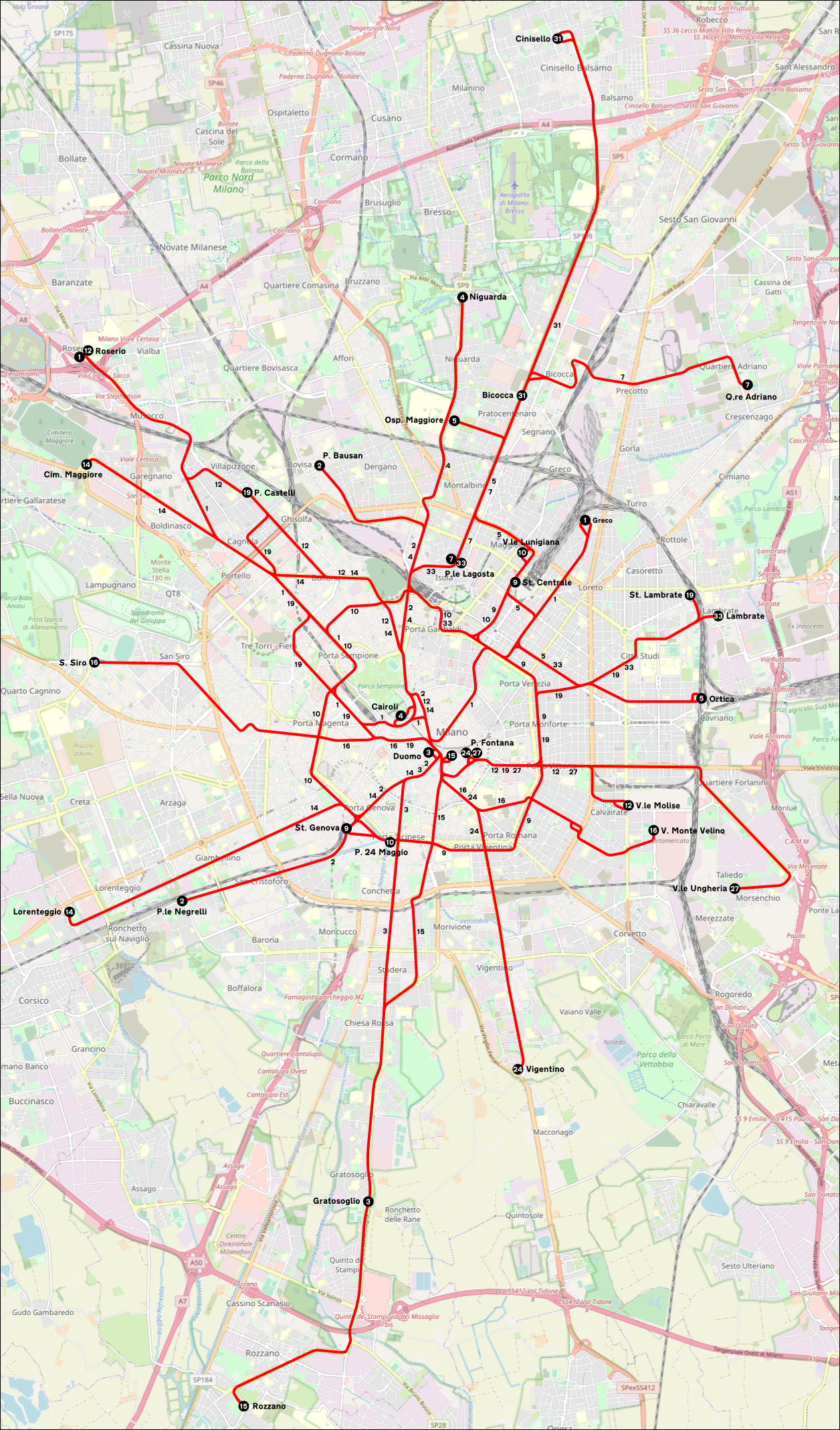
- Website: http://www.atm.it/en/Pages/default.aspx ATM (in English)

The Milan tramway network (Italian: Rete tranviaria di Milano) is part of the public transport network of Milan, Italy, operated by Azienda Trasporti Milanesi (ATM).

In operation since 1881, the network is currently 157 km (98 mi) long, making it one of the biggest in the world. It has the unusual track gauge of 1,445 mm (4 ft 8 7/8 in) (Italian gauge), and comprises 17 urban lines.

While the Milan metro is characterized by a low level of centrality, with no more than two lines ever crossing each other at any of the interchange stations, the tram network is substantially centralized, with nearly half of the lines passing or terminating around Piazza del Duomo, the city central square.

== History ==
=== Horses and steam (1876–93) ===
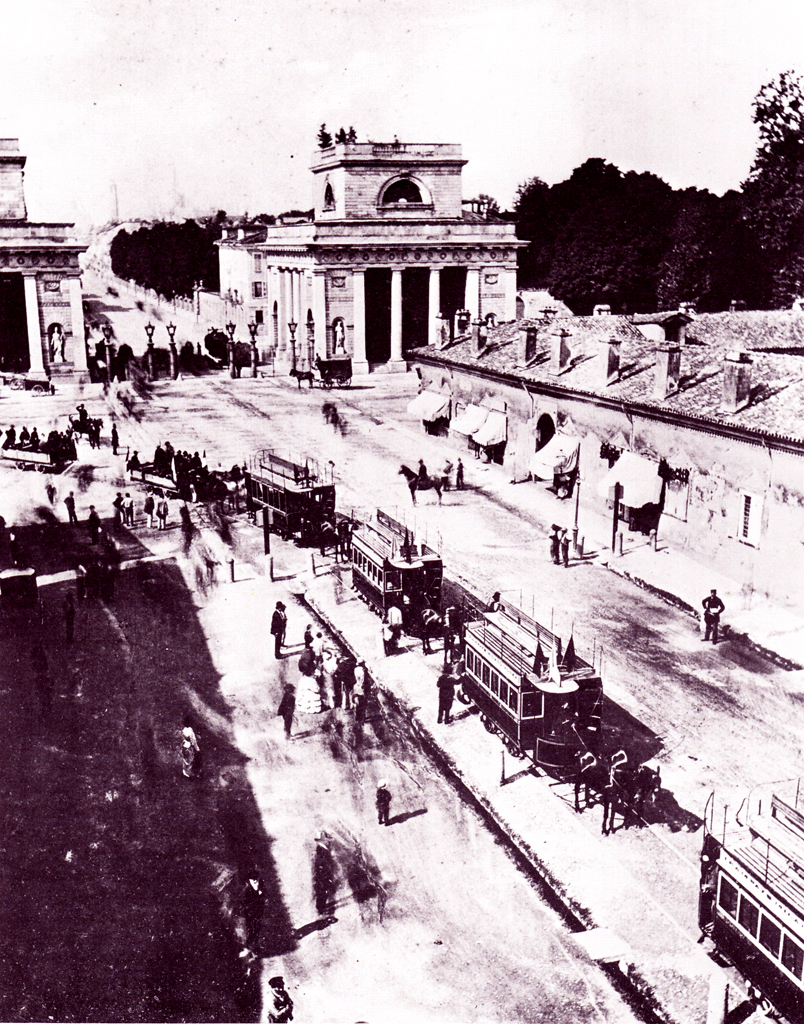
Inauguration of the Milan–Monza tramway, 1876.

Following the establishment of omnibus services in 1841, Milan acquired its first trams on 8 July 1876, upon the inauguration of the Milan–Monza tramway, which was operated by animal traction. The terminus of this line was at Porta Venezia, outside the city limits.

On 24 June 1877, a second tramway was opened between Milan and Saronno, with a terminus at Arco della Pace.

After only a few months, the city government agreed to the laying of rails in the city. The line from Monza was therefore extended up to Piazza San Babila, and the line from Saronno through Piazza d'Armi to Via Cusani, inside the city limits.

A year later, on 6 June 1878, Milan's first steam tramway, to Vaprio, started operations. The success of this line made steam power popular. The existing line to Saronno was therefore extended (1878), and new lines were constructed to Sedriano (1879), Vimercate, Pavia and Lodi (1880), Giussano (1881), and elsewhere. These lines did not form a single network, but were awarded to different companies, and were operated from different termini.

Milan's first urban tramway network, with animal traction, was opened in 1881, at the National Exhibition. This network was laid out radially, with a central terminus in Piazza del Duomo, and lines heading out towards the city gates. It was managed by the Società Anonima degli Omnibus (English: Omnibus Public Limited Company) (SAO).

=== The Edison era (1893–1917) ===
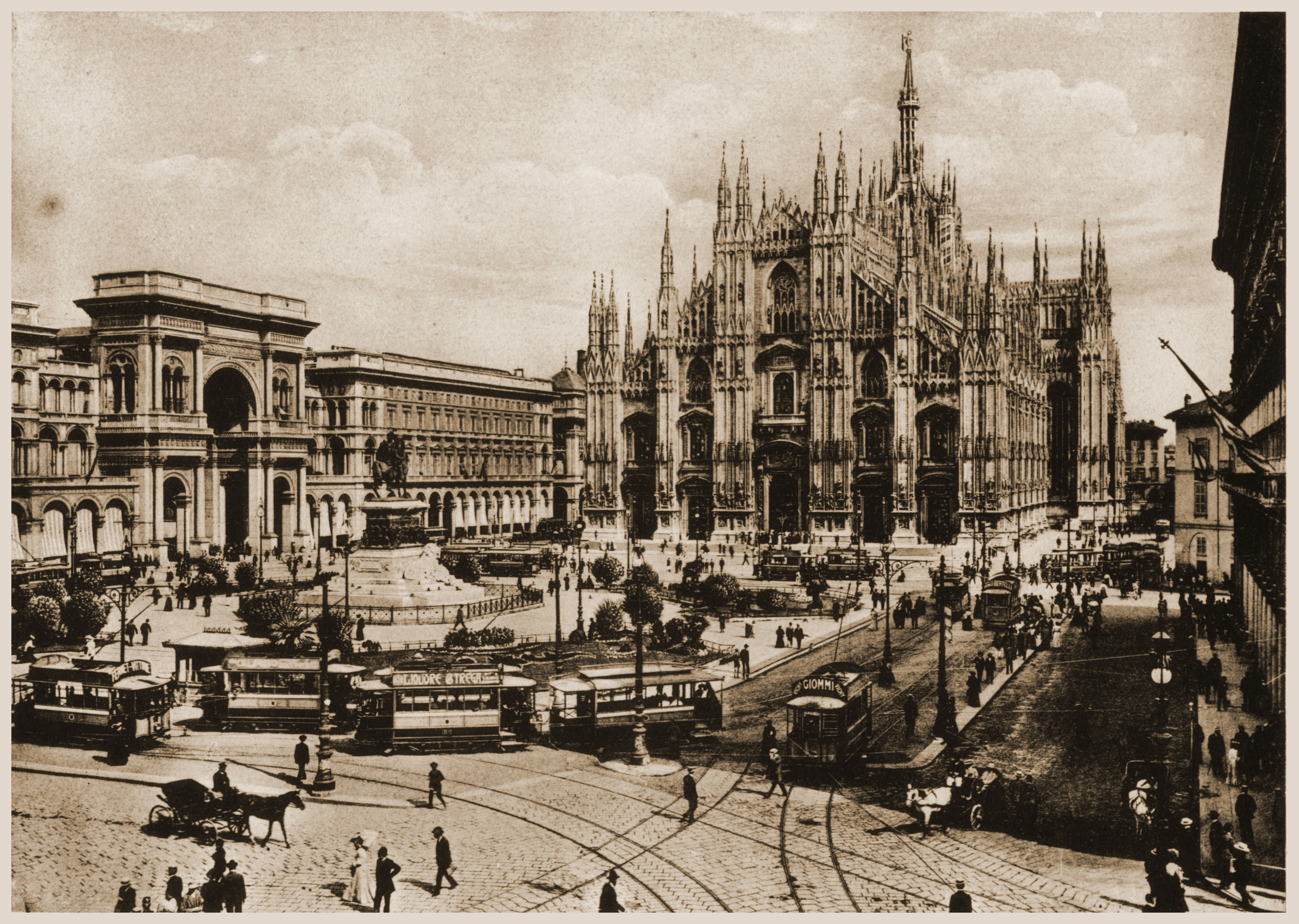
Electric trams at the central terminus, Piazza del Duomo.

In 1892, the Edison company presented a project for the electrification of the urban tramway network. The first stage of this project was an experimental line from Piazza del Duomo to Corso Sempione through new residential areas, to demonstrate the advantages of the new system. A year later works started on the rest of the project. By 1895, Edison had replaced the SAO in managing the network. Electrification was completed in 1901.

In 1910, following an expansion of the network, line numbering was introduced, using numbers from 1 to 30.

=== The early ATM years (1917–45) ===
In 1917, the comune of Milan assumed direct control of the city's tramway network, through the Ufficio Tramviario Municipale. A new corporation, the Azienda Tranviaria Municipale (ATM), was established to manage the network's operations.

In 1926, the network was substantially reformed. The so-called "carousel" terminus in Piazza del Duomo, which had become a source of traffic problems for Milan's emerging automobile traffic, was closed. The radial lines previously focused on that terminus were transformed into V-shaped lines, which called instead at one of two terminals located relatively close together. Additionally, in an effort to discourage passengers from taking unnecessarily long journeys, ATM started selling tickets for single trips, with no set period of validity.

From the following year, until 1930, the 502 members of the now famous series 1500 trams entered Milan's tramcar fleet. These trams, many of which are still in service, were modelled on the then most modern American Peter Witt streetcars.

In 1931, a few tram lines were modified to serve the new Milano Centrale railway station, located several hundred metres north of its predecessor.

The first trolleybus routes in Milan commenced operations in 1933. However, in contrast with many Italian cities, Milan did not replace its trams with this new form of public transport. Trolleybuses were used instead to complement the trams on peripheral routes, and in particular, on Milan's outer ring road. The tramway network, which had been further extended, was still efficient (thanks to Milan's wide streets and many private homes), and was all double track, with spacious and modern tramcars. In the same year, many of the city's bus routes were extended, particularly to outside locations that had been annexed to the comune of Milan in 1923.

In 1939, the extensive long-distance tramway network, electrified in the previous decade by the Società Trazione Elettrica Lombarda (English: Electric Traction Company of Lombardy) (STEL), came under the management of ATM. The urban tramway network reached its peak in the same year. World War II caused serious damage to that network, but the damage was soon repaired.

=== Contraction and revival (1945–present) ===
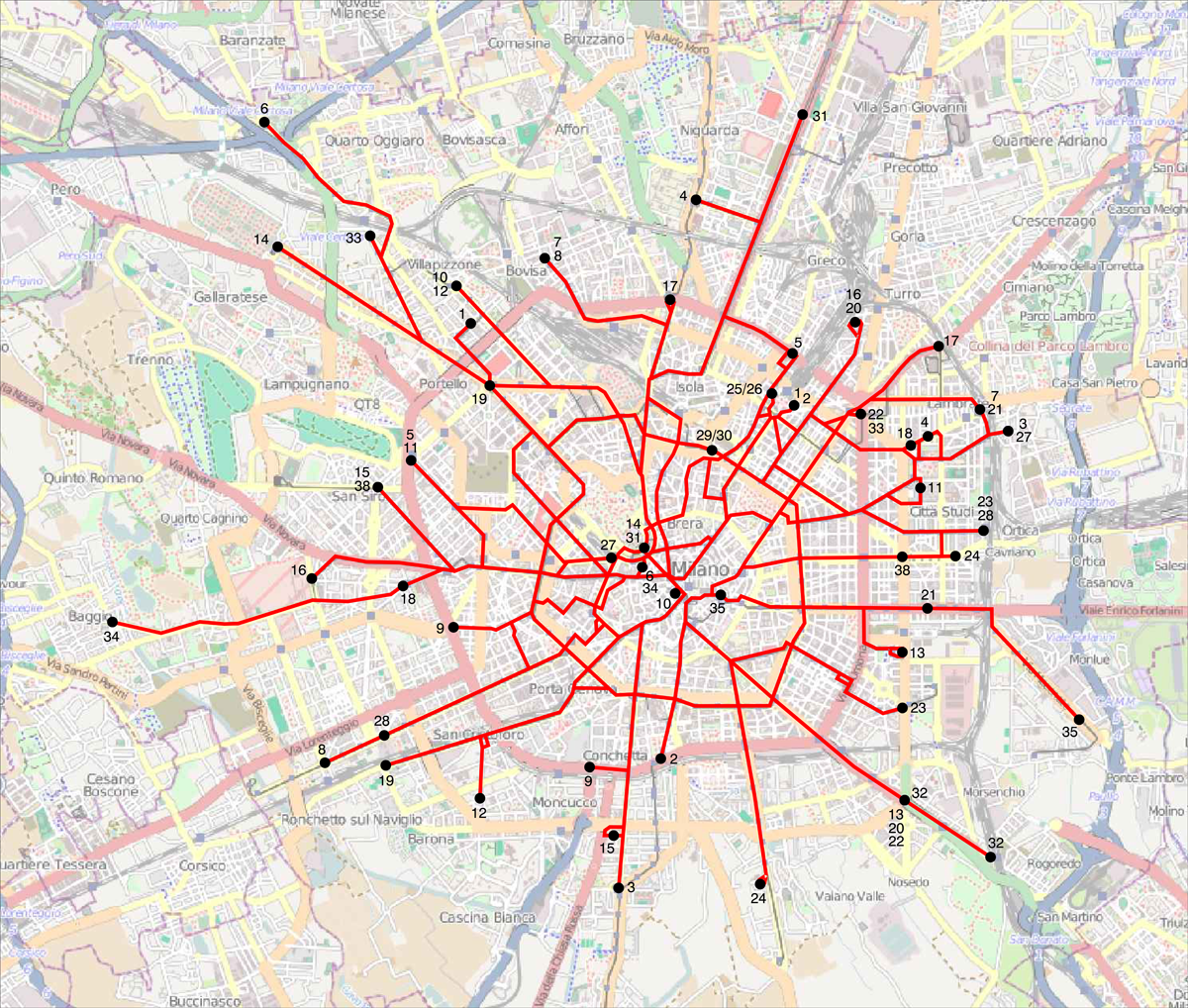
The network in 1948.

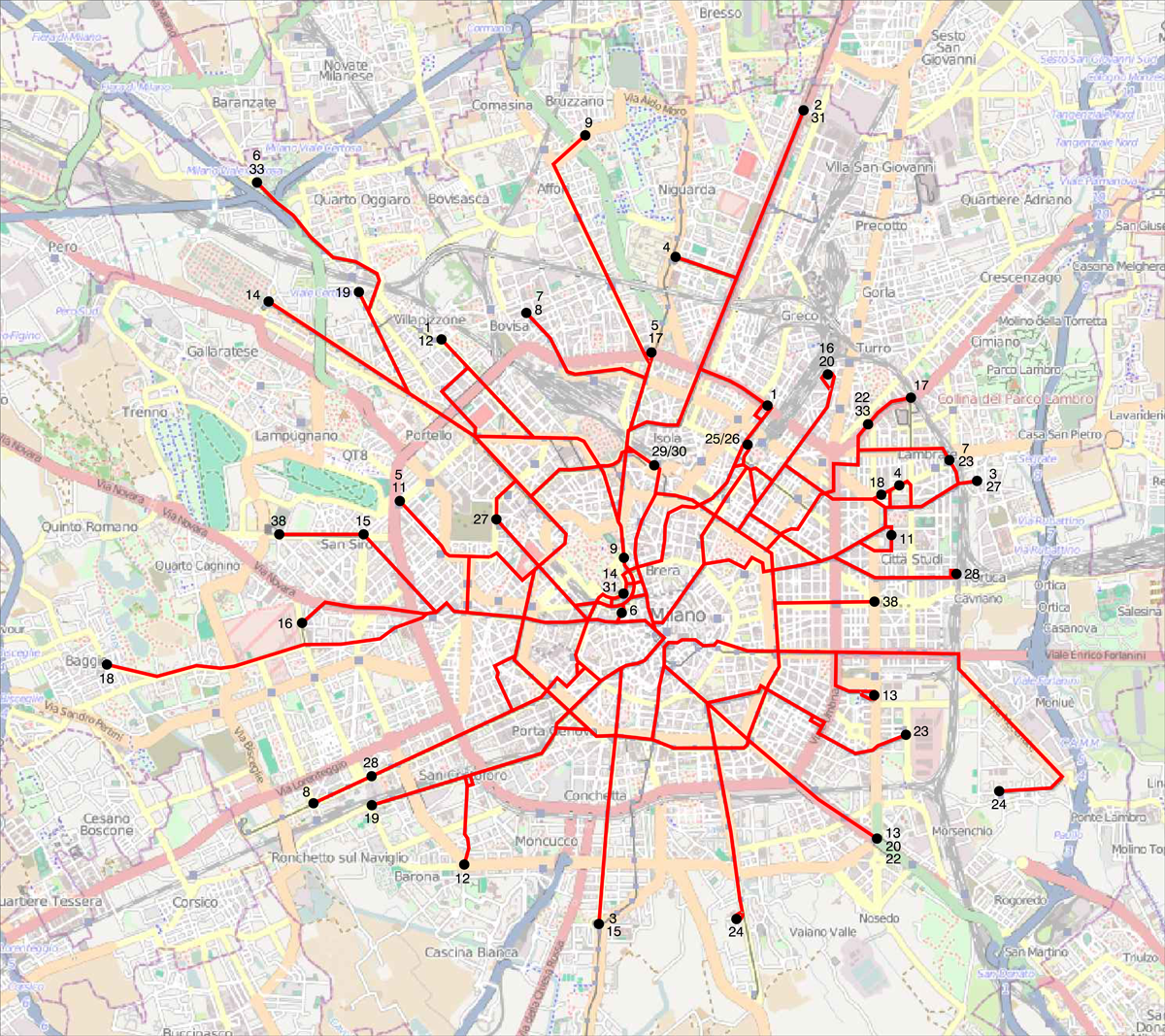
The network in 1964.

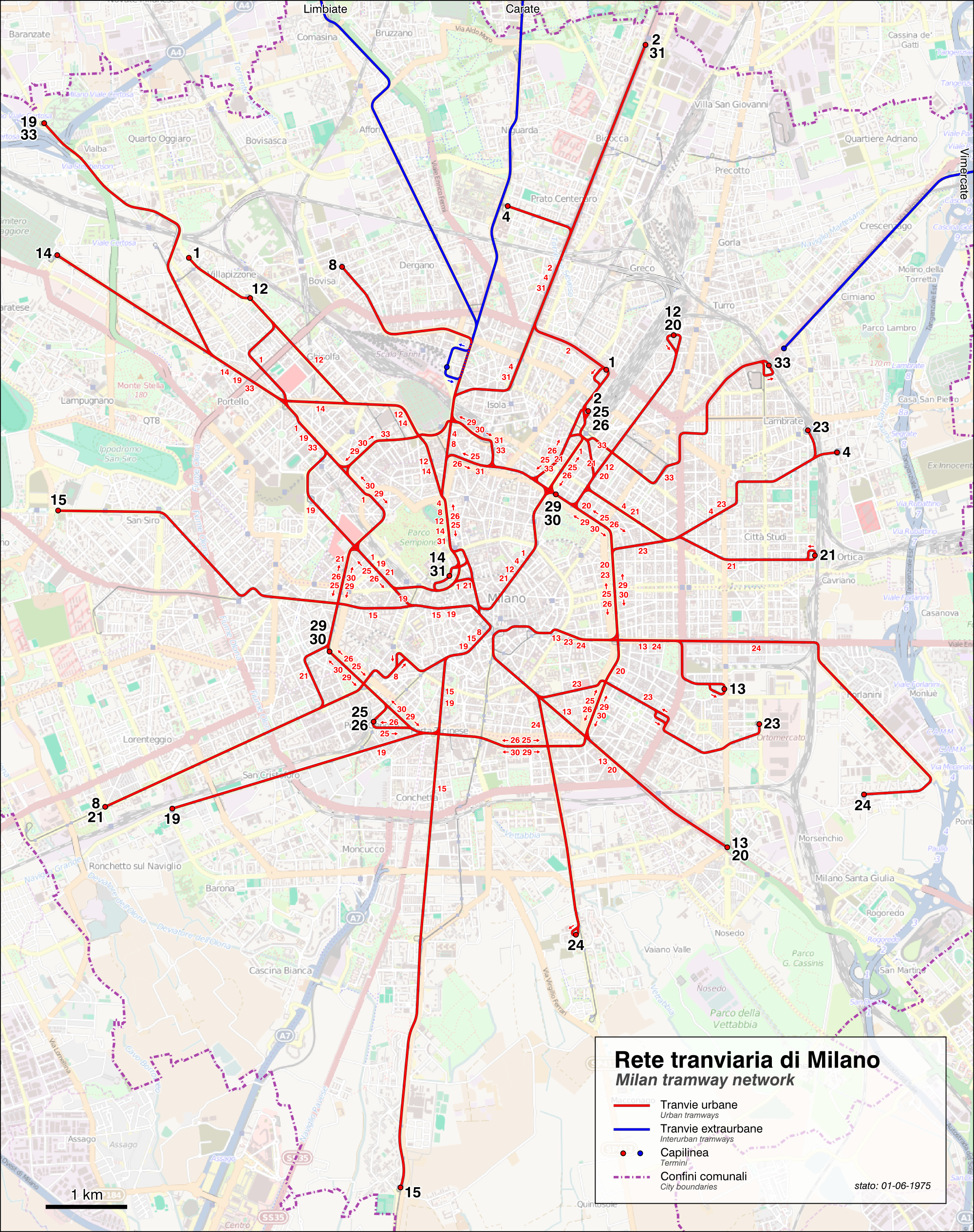
The network in 1975.

After the war, trams came to be seen as an outdated and inflexible form of transportation for Milan. The Piano Regolatore Generale Comunale (English: General Municipal Plan) (PRGC) of 1953 called for the complete elimination of trams from the city centre, and their replacement with an underground Metro network (a proposal that had already been made before the war).

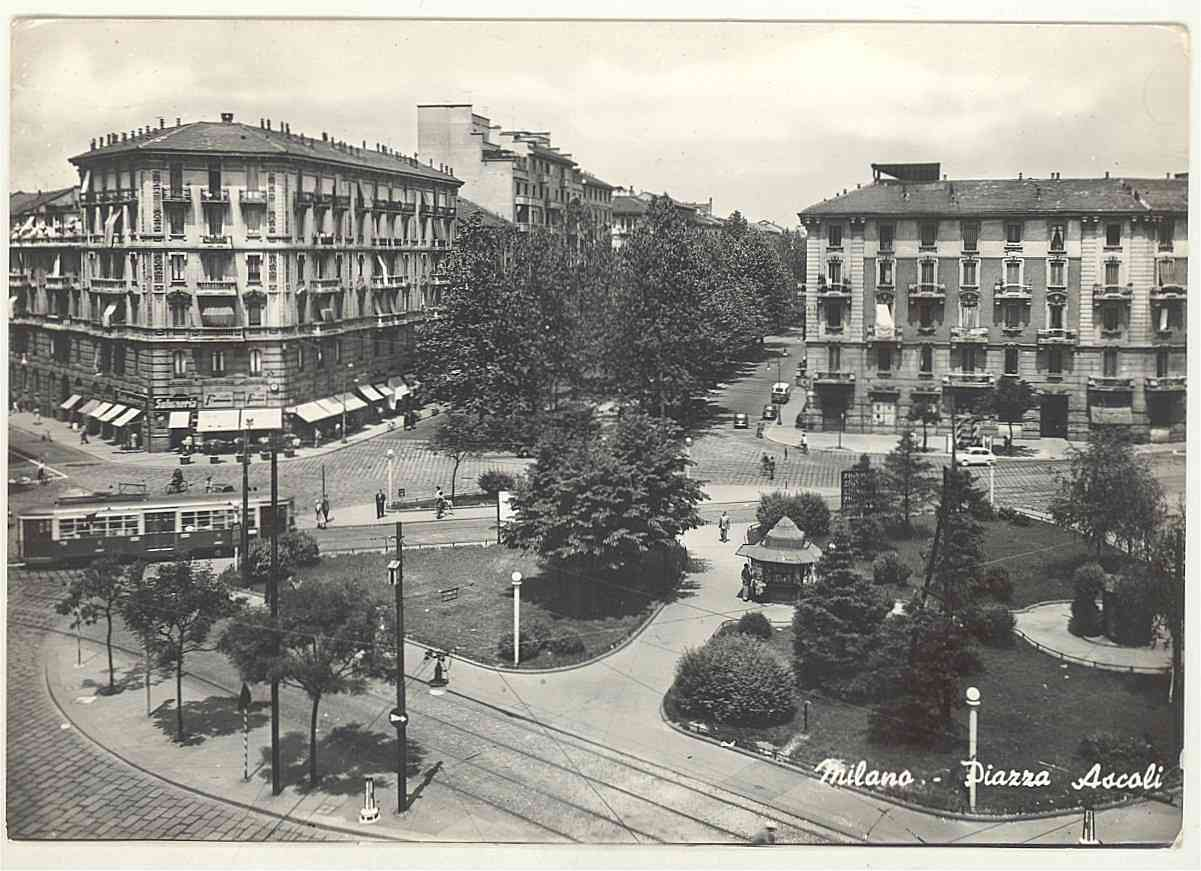
A tram in Piazza Ascoli, 1964.

Implementation of this plan began rapidly. In 1957, work started on the excavation of the first Metro line, leading to the removal of tramway lines from some critical transport axes (Corso Buenos Aires, Corso Vittorio Emanuele, Via Dante, etc.). Closed sections of tramway were not later reinstated, but replaced by new bus routes (Viale Liguria, Via Canonica). On the other hand, two tramway extensions were opened, to serve the new suburbs of Taliedo (1964) and Gratosoglio (1969).

The 1950s and 1960s also saw the closure of almost all of Milan's interurban tramways, and their replacement by bus routes.

A further sharp contraction of the tram network took place on 9 March 1970. In conjunction with the introduction of time based ticketing (in place of tickets for single trips), the network was generally reorganised, with duplicated lines being eliminated. Two years later, trams also disappeared from Corso Garibaldi, to make way for the construction site of Metro line 2.

Nevertheless, the Milan tram network, although reduced, was still modernized. In 1971, new high capacity series 4800 Jumbotrams entered service. Their construction had involved the joining together of body shells of older trams.

Until 1972, all trams carried conductors, but these were phased out between 1972 and 1979, except on the interurban lines, as ATM gradually converted its trams to one-man operation. Running parallel to that programme was ATM's conversion of its urban tram fleet from trolley pole current collection to pantographs, requiring modification of the overhead trolley wiring, which was spread out over several years for reasons of cost and practicality. The conversion to one-man operation and use of pantographs began in August 1972, with a single route (then route 2), and was completed in early 1979 with route 23. The two interurban tram lines to Desio (with branch to Milanino) and Limbiate continued to use trolley-pole-equipped cars until autumn 1983 and October 1986, respectively.

In 1976, the series 4900 trams were ordered, in anticipation of the (never realized) transformation of the trolleybus circular route 90/91 into a light rail service. In 1981, the Via Larga tramway was opened, to reduce transit times in the city centre.

In the early 1990s, despite the opening of the Gratosoglio – Rozzano extension (1992), the tramway network suffered further cuts, triggered by the activation of the third Metro line.

Only in 1994 did a process of revival of the tramways begin, with the establishment of new lines, the restoration of abandoned sections, and the drafting of new guidelines to be implemented to modern standards (fast tram). New tramway lines could therefore be constructed to Bicocca (2002), Niguarda (2003), Porta Lodovica-Piazza Abbiategrasso (2003), Precotto (2007) and Cinisello (2009).

Additionally, the tram fleet has been renewed since the early 1990s, with the entry into service of new series 7000 trams (ADtranz Eurotrams), and the even newer series 7100/7500/7600 trams (Ansaldobreda Sirio and "Sirietto" models), to replace many old trams, of series 1500 and 4800.

In September 2018, after numerous delays, the tram network added a new extension in the municipality of Rozzano, bringing the line closer to its town centre (Rozzano Vecchia).

The urban tram system is entirely double-track except for a short single-track section through the Medieval Porta Ticinese, on line 3.

== Services ==
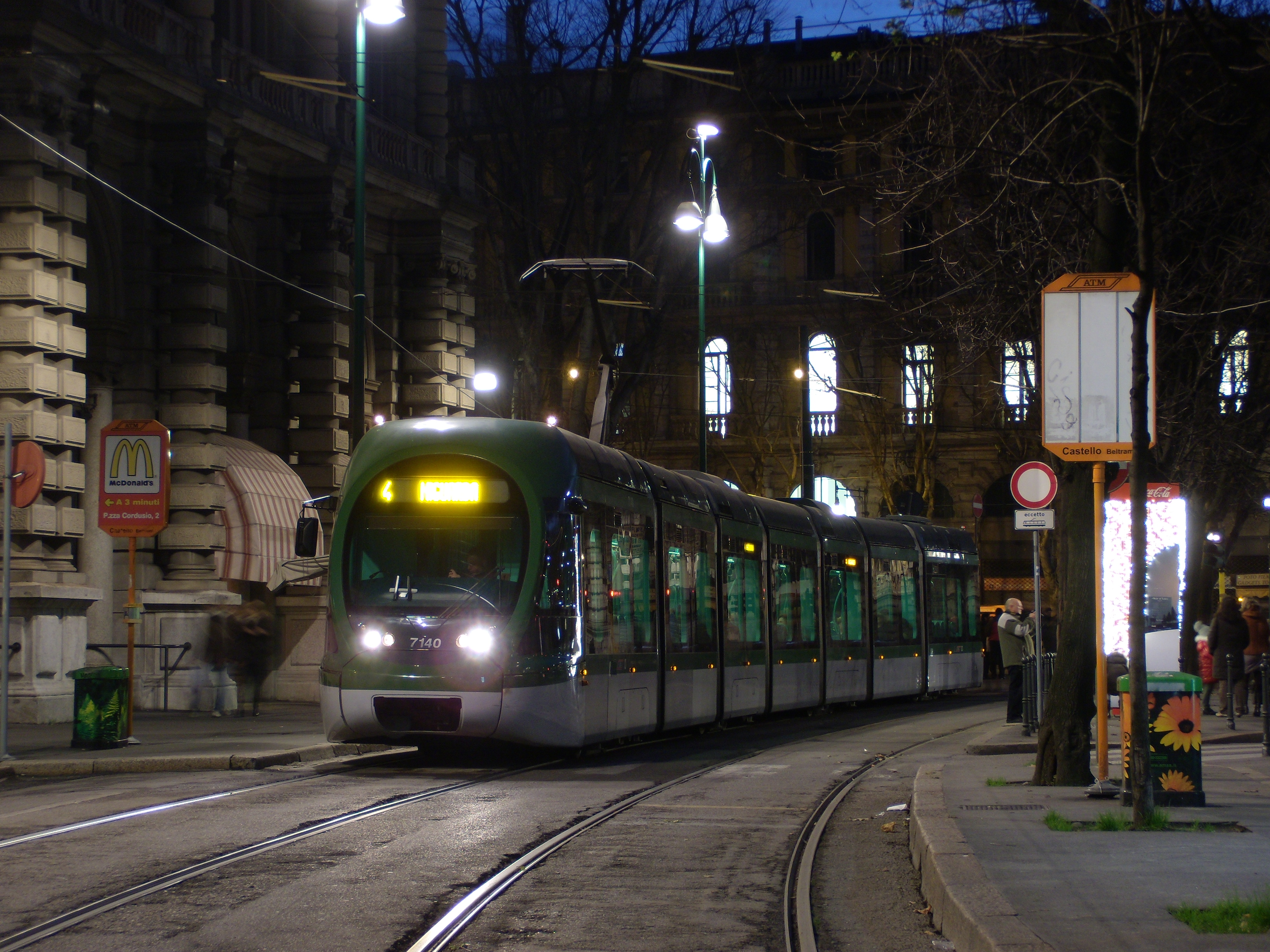
Series 7100 tram on line 4 in Piazza Castello.

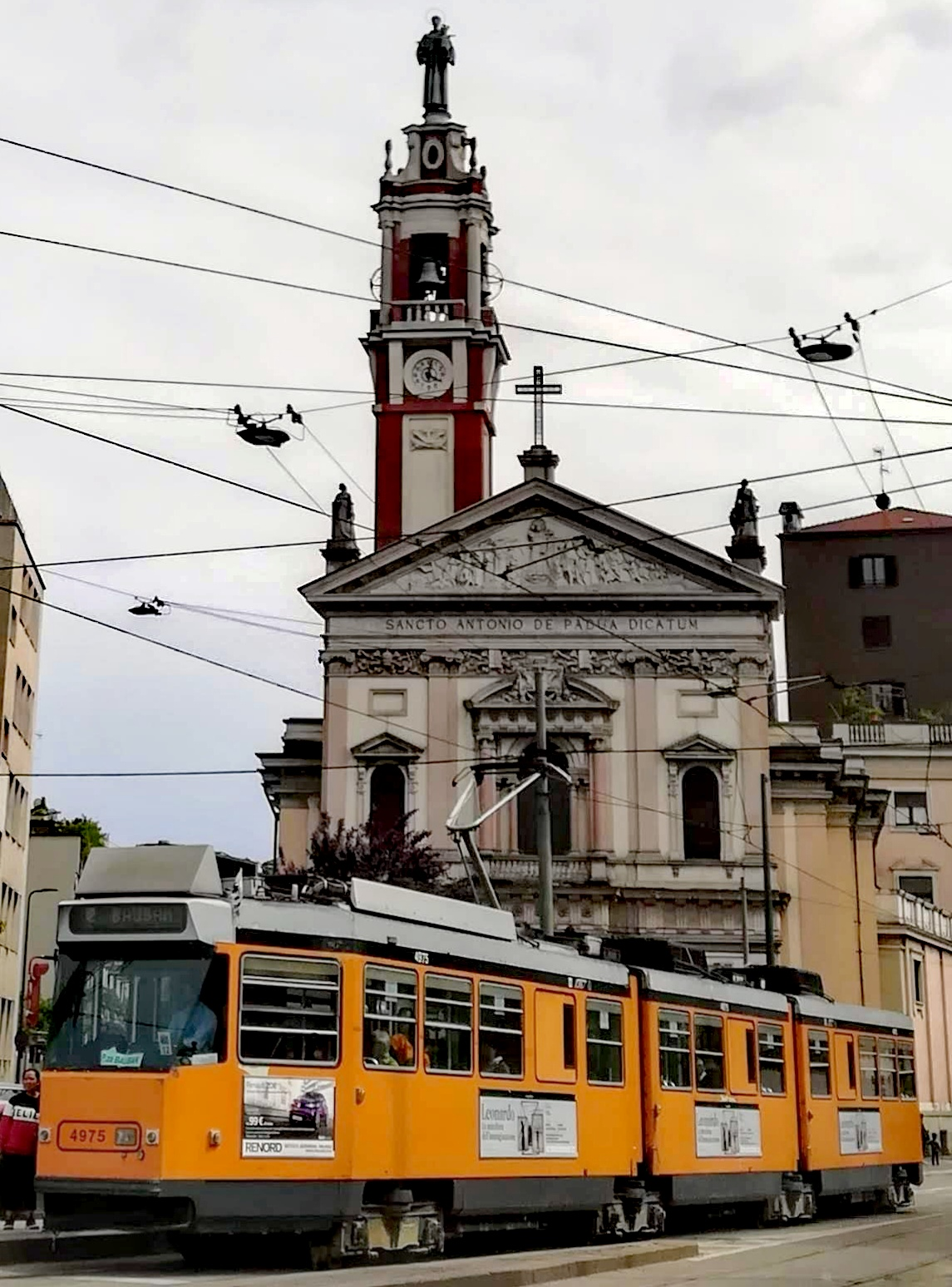
Series 4900 tram on line 2 at the via Carlo Farini (Monumentale)

The Milan tramway network comprises the following lines:

=== Urban lines ===
- 1 Greco (Via Martiri Oscuri) ↔ Roserio (Sacco Hospital)
- 2 Piazzale Bausan ↔ Piazzale Negrelli
- 3 Duomo M1 M3 ↔ Gratosoglio
- 4 Cairoli M1 ↔ Niguarda (Parco Nord)
- 5 Ortica ↔ Niguarda Hospital
- 7 Piazzale Lagosta ↔ Quartiere Adriano
- 9 Centrale FS M2 M3 ↔ Porta Genova FS M2 (right side of the circle)
- 10 Viale Lunigiana ↔ Piazza XXIV Maggio (left side of the circle)
- 12 Roserio (Sacco Hospital) ↔ Viale Molise
- 14 Maggiore Cemetery ↔ Lorenteggio
- 15 Duomo M1 M3 ↔ Rozzano (via Guido Rossa)
- 16 San Siro Stadium M5 ↔ Via Monte Velino
- 19 Lambrate FS M2 ↔ Piazza Castelli
- 24 Piazza Fontana (Duomo M1 M3) ↔ Vigentino
- 27 Piazza Fontana (Duomo M1 M3) ↔ Viale Ungheria
- 31 Bicocca M5 ↔ Cinisello Balsamo (Via I Maggio)
- 33 Piazzale Lagosta ↔ Rimembranze di Lambrate

=== Interurban lines (temporarily discontinued) ===
- 178 Niguarda ↔ Desio (Tranvia Milano-Desio) (discontinued from late 2011, with the project of a new line running on the same track bed and extended to Seregno railway station, whose construction started in 2024)
- 179 Comasina ↔ Limbiate (Tranvia Milano-Limbiate) (discontinued from 2022)

== Rolling stock ==
=== Retired series ===
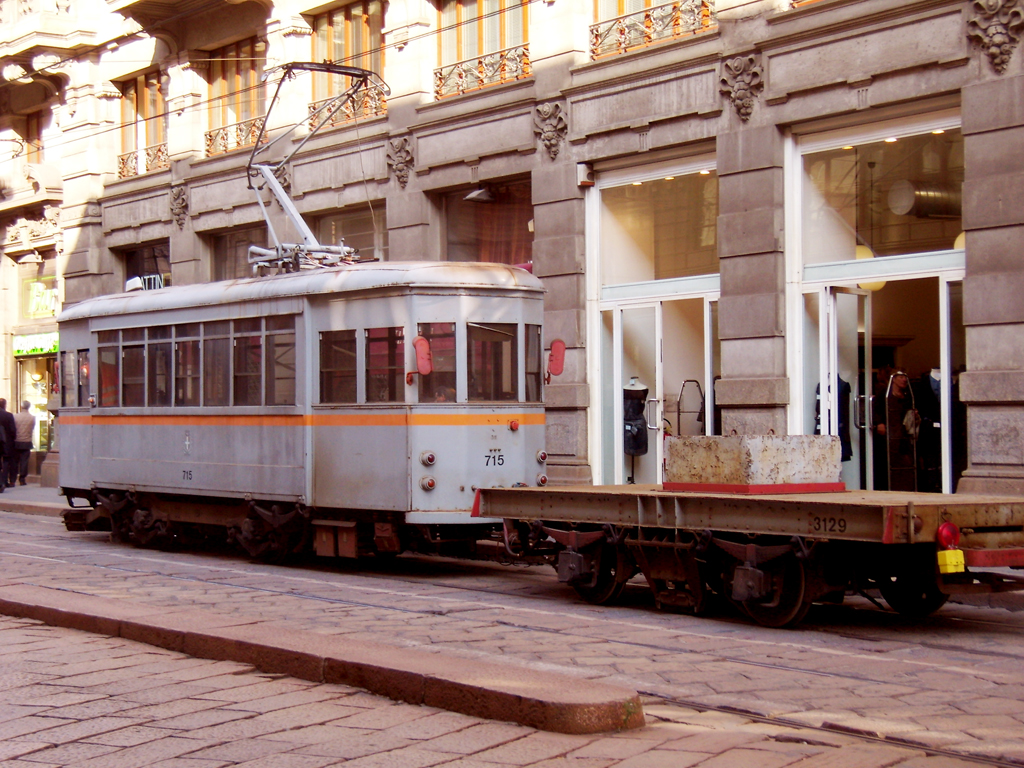
Series 700 tram in Via Orefici

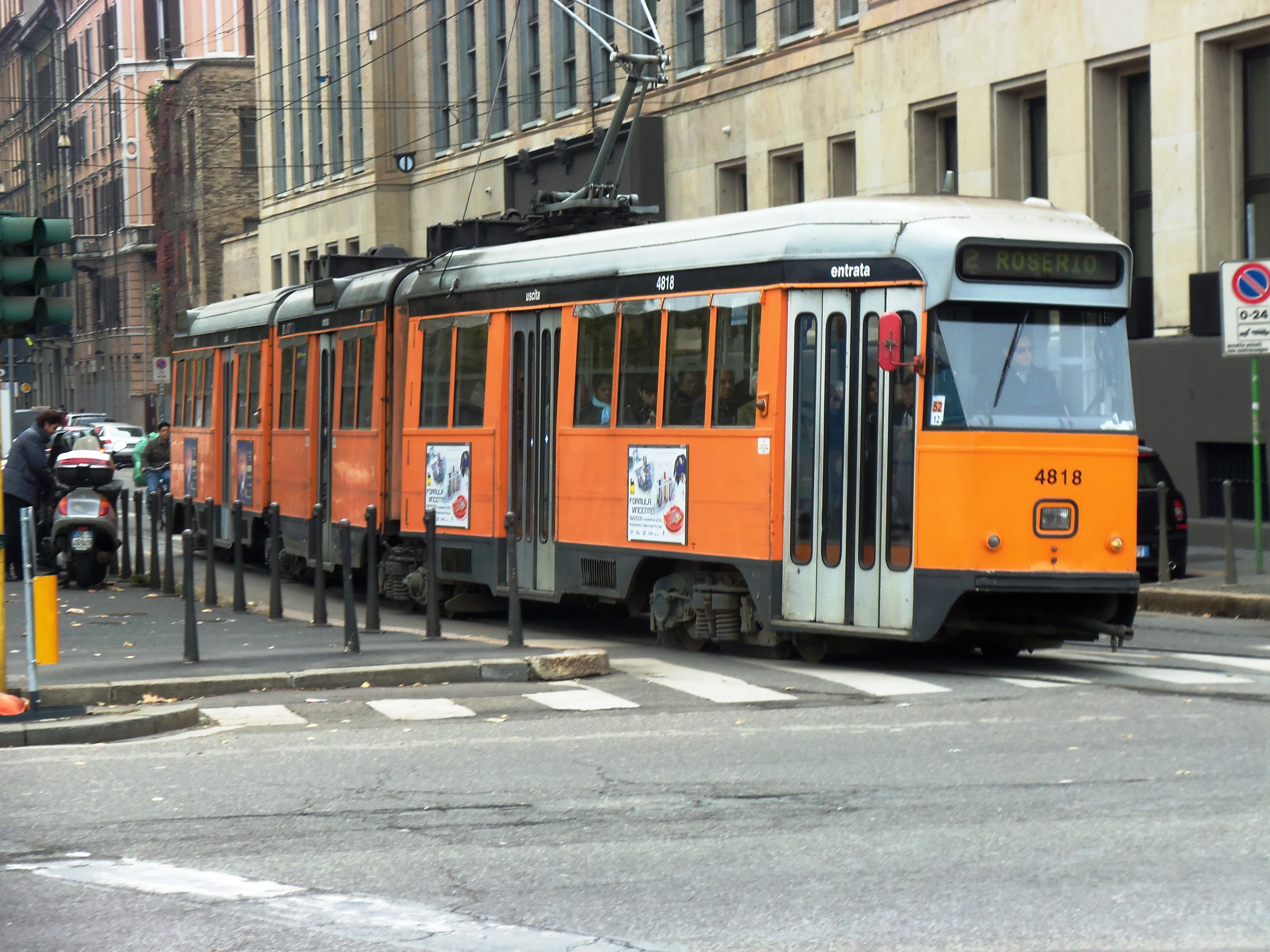
Series 4800 JumboTram, November 2010

In the past, the Milan urban network has been served by the following tramcar series, now retired:

- "Edison" (the last one decommissioned in the early 1960s);
- Series 600 (decommissioned in the 1960s);
- Series 700 (in service until the 1960s, and then rebuilt for internal use as sand spreaders, snowplows, etc.);
- Series 3000 (decommissioned in the 1960s);
- Series 4000 (the last one decommissioned in the 1970s);
- Series 4500 (decommissioned in the mid 1960s);
- Series 4600 (Stanga/Tibb - 2 sections) (decommissioned in early 2025)
- Series 4800 (ATM/Mauri JumboTram - 28.2 m (92 ft 6 in), three sections) (decommissioned at the end of 2010);
- Series 5000 (the last decommissioned at the end of the 1970s);
- Series 5100 (decommissioned in 1986);
- Series 5200 and 5300 (used in the 1970s to build the Series 4800 trams);
- Series 5400 (one used to build the prototype 4801; two sold to ATAC in Rome and then scrapped).

=== Current fleet ===
Still in service on the Milan urban network are tramcars of the following series:

- Series 1500;
- Series 4700 (Stanga/Tibb - 2 sections);
- Series 4900 (Fiat Ferroviaria and OMS JumboTram - 29.2 m (95 ft 10 in), 3 sections);
- Series 7000 (ADtranz Eurotram - 34.10 m (111 ft 11 in), 7 sections - design by Zagato);
- Series 7100 (Ansaldobreda Sirio - 35.35 m (116.0 ft), 7 sections - design by Pininfarina);
- Series 7500 (Ansaldobreda Sirio - 26.5 m (87 ft), 5 sections - design by Pininfarina);
- Series 7600 (Ansaldobreda Sirio - 26.5 m (87 ft), 5 sections - design by Pininfarina).
- Series 7700 (Stadler Tramlink - 25 m or 35 m, 3 or 5 sections)
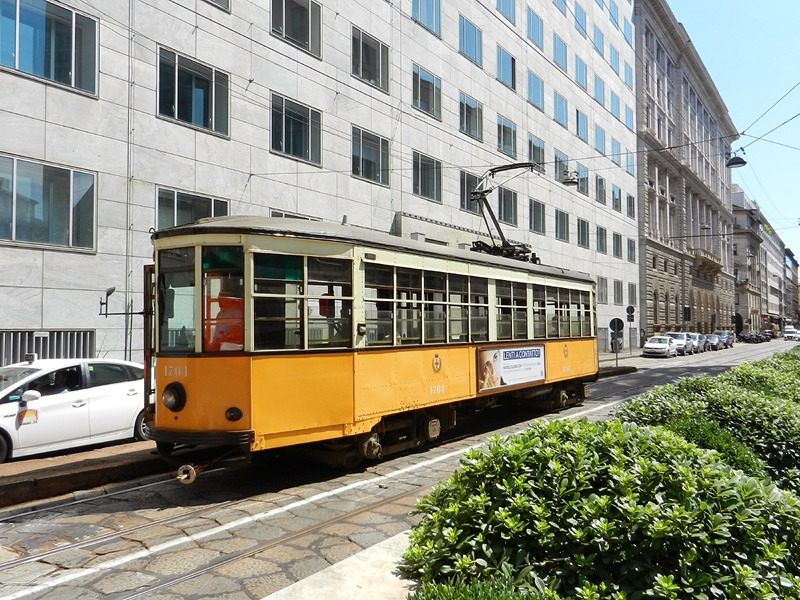
Series 1500

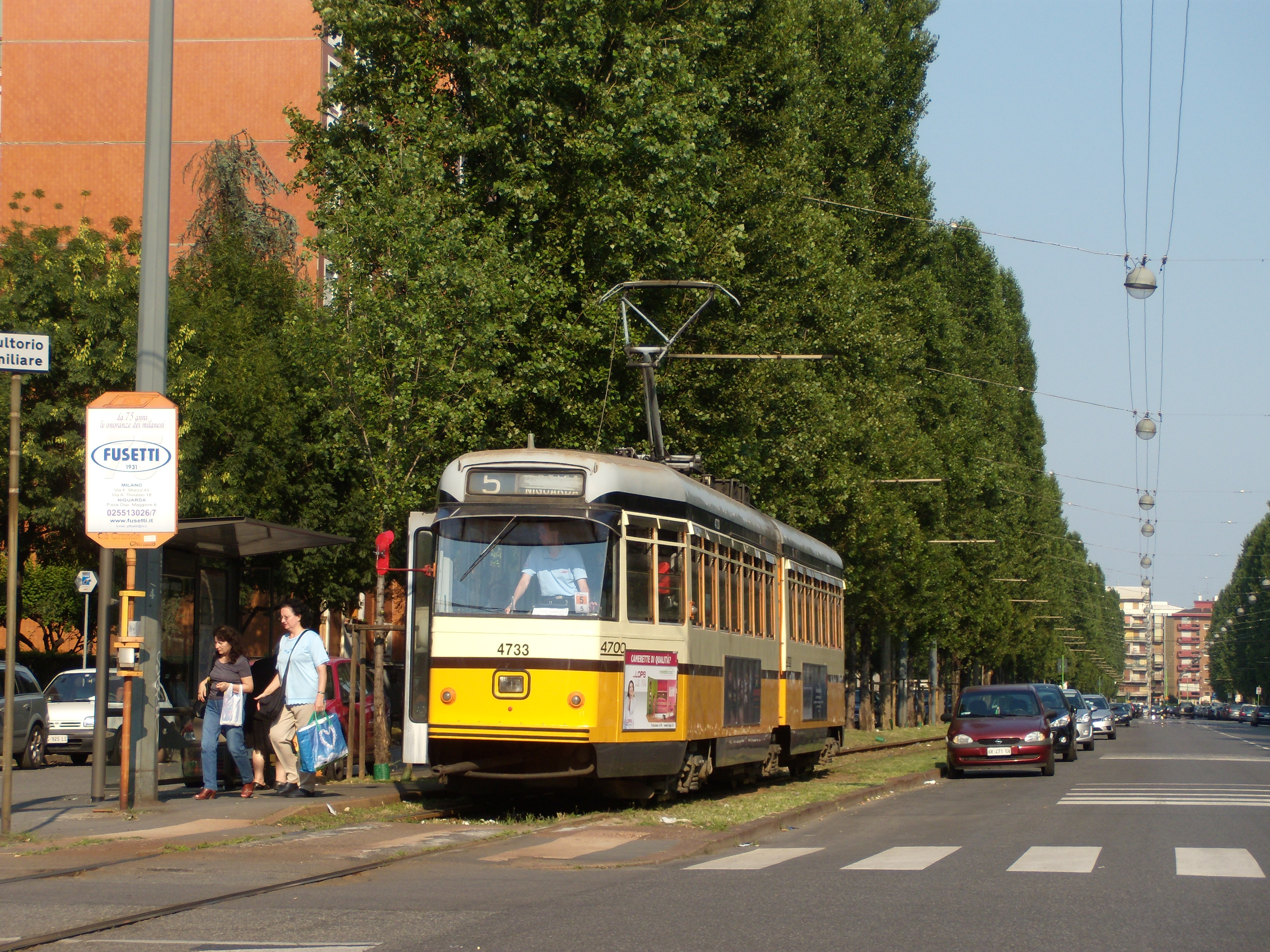
Series 4600/4700

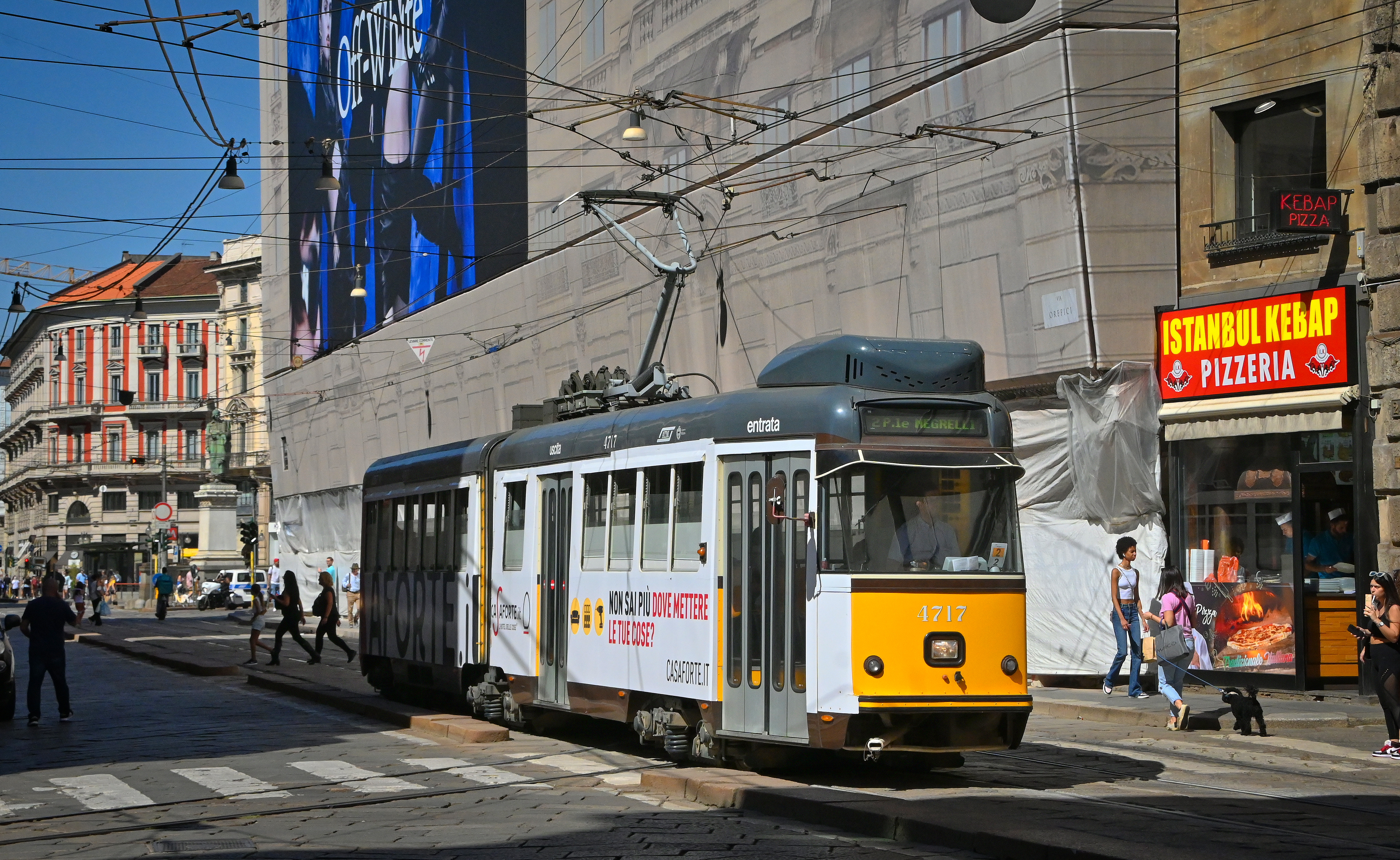
series 4700 revamped

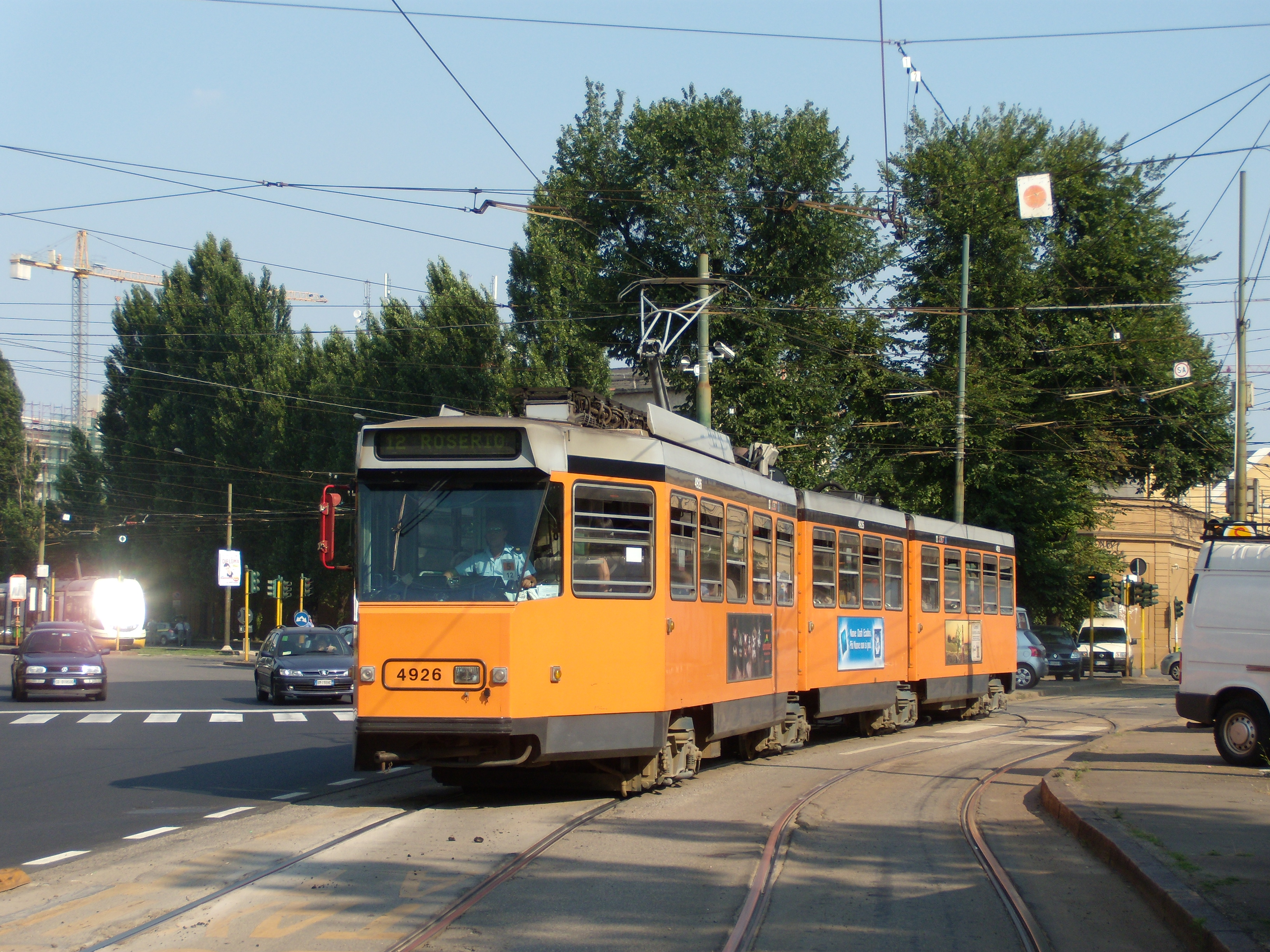
Series 4900

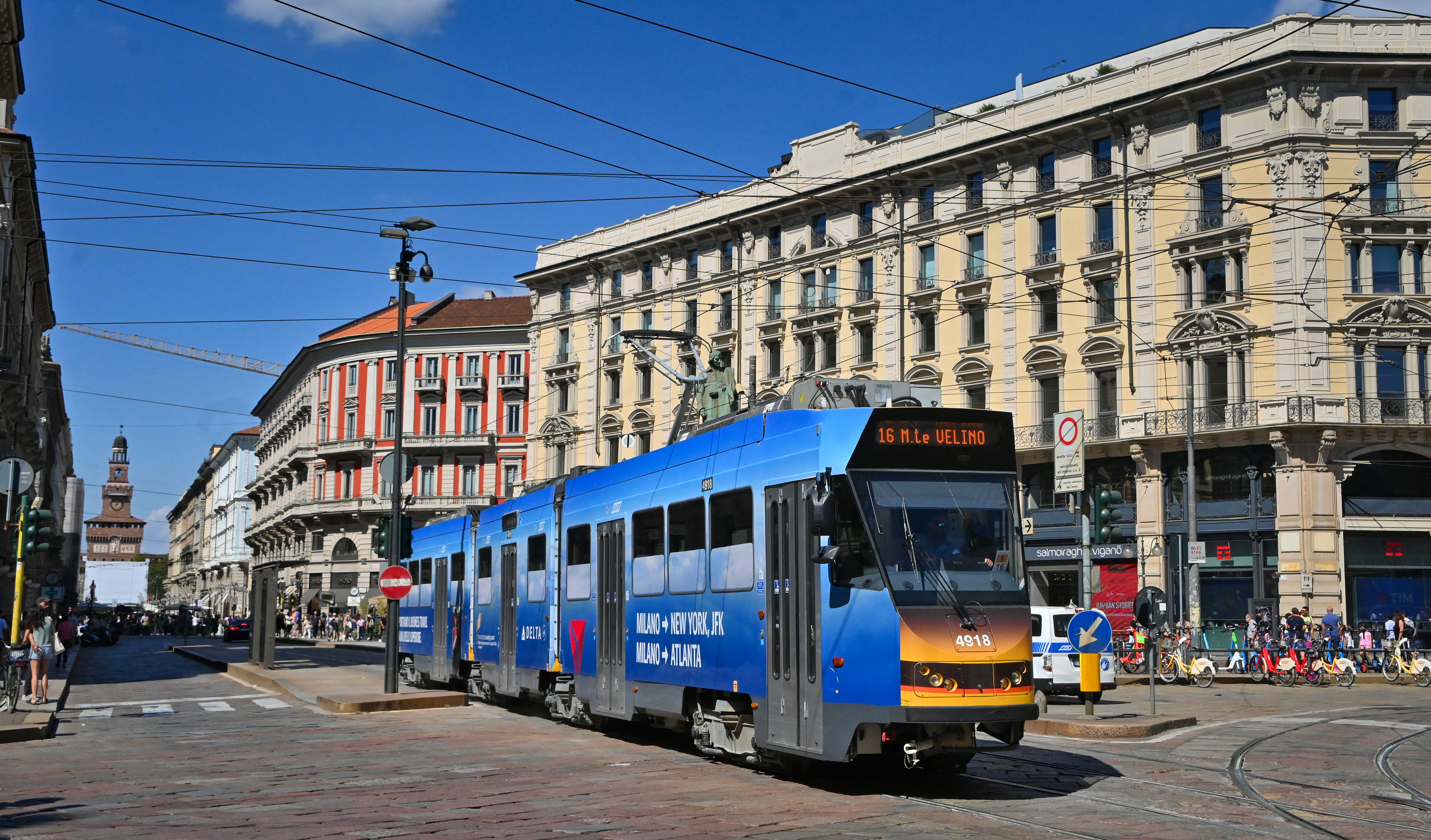
Series 4900 revamped

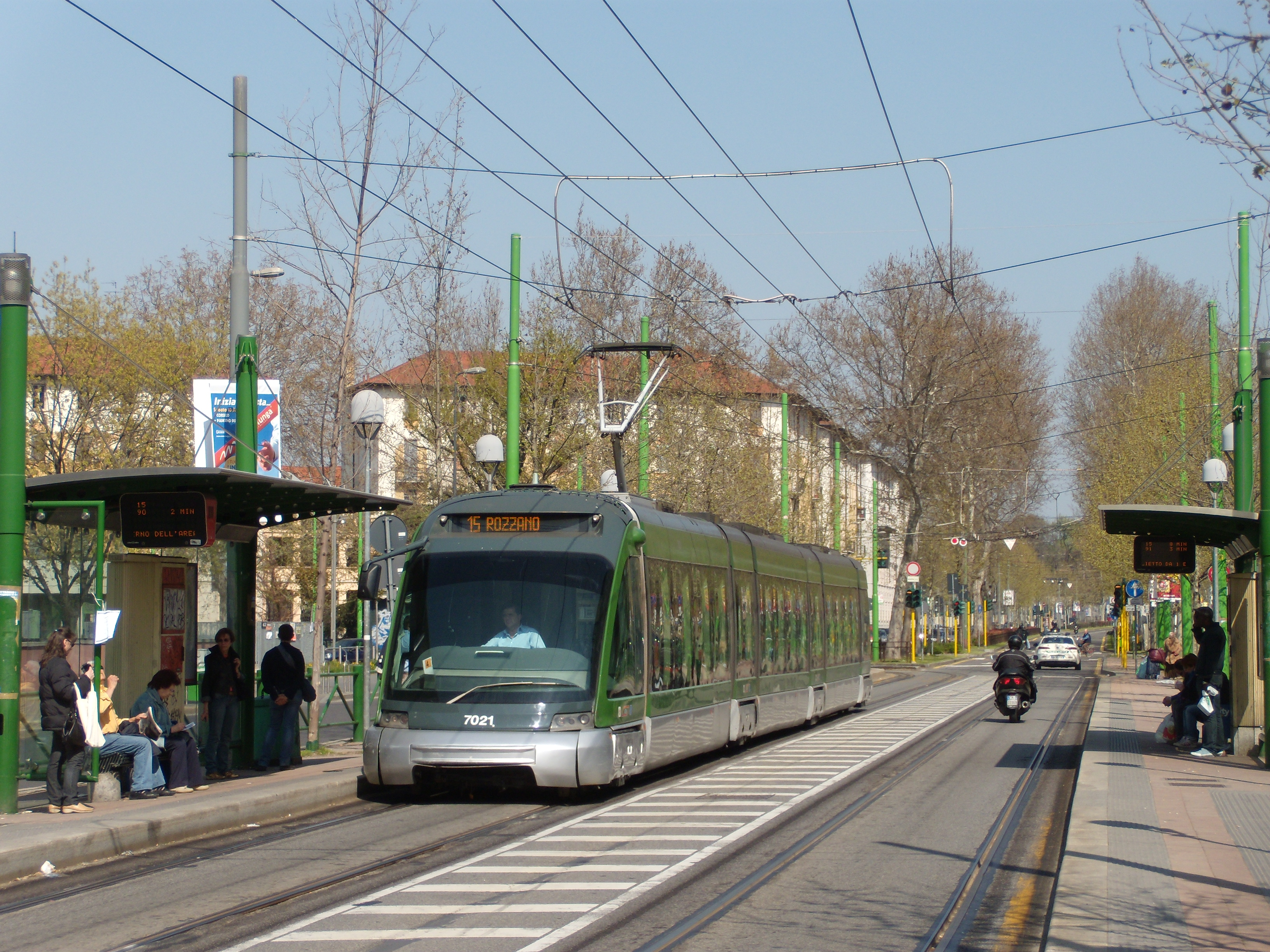
Series 7000

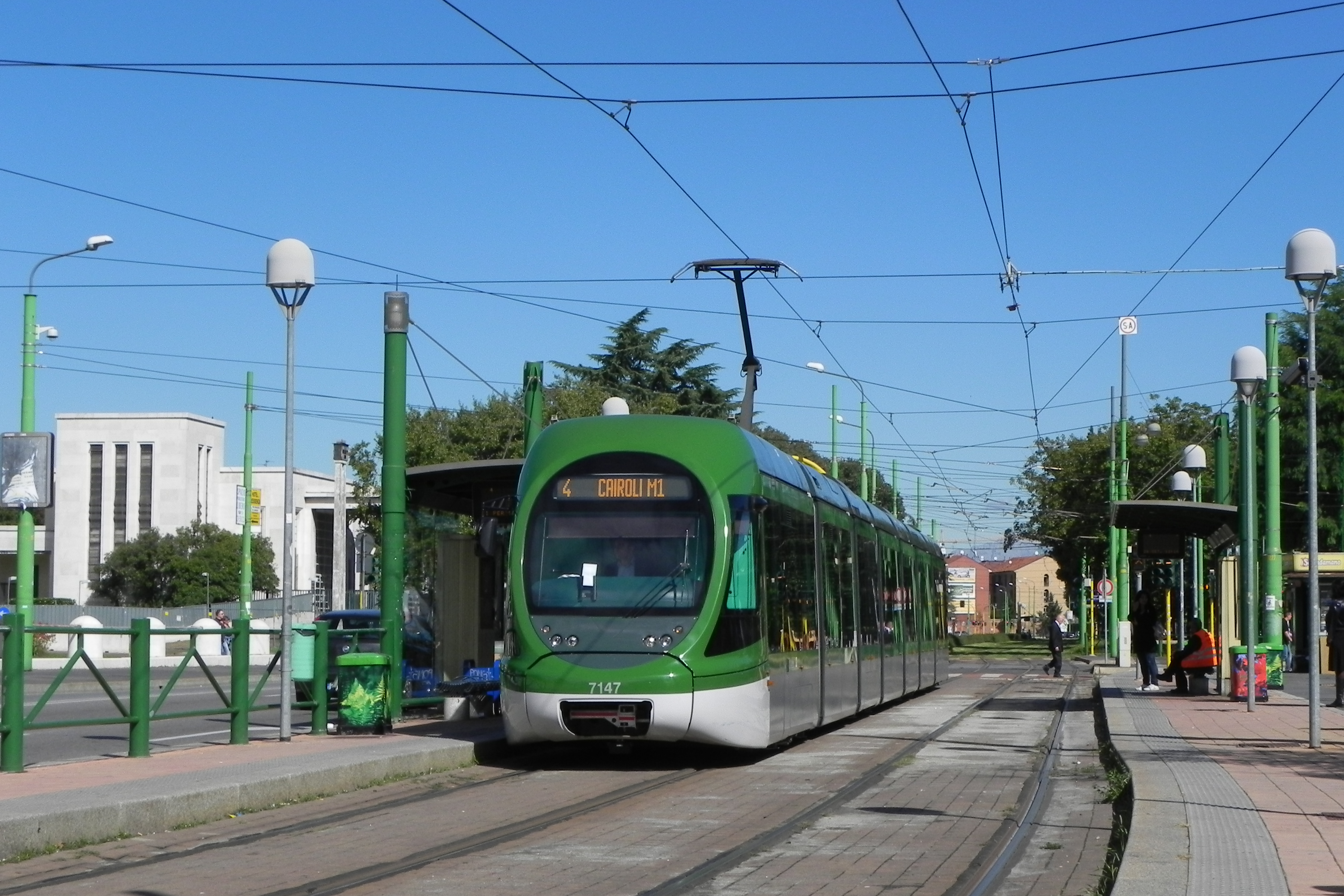
Series 7100

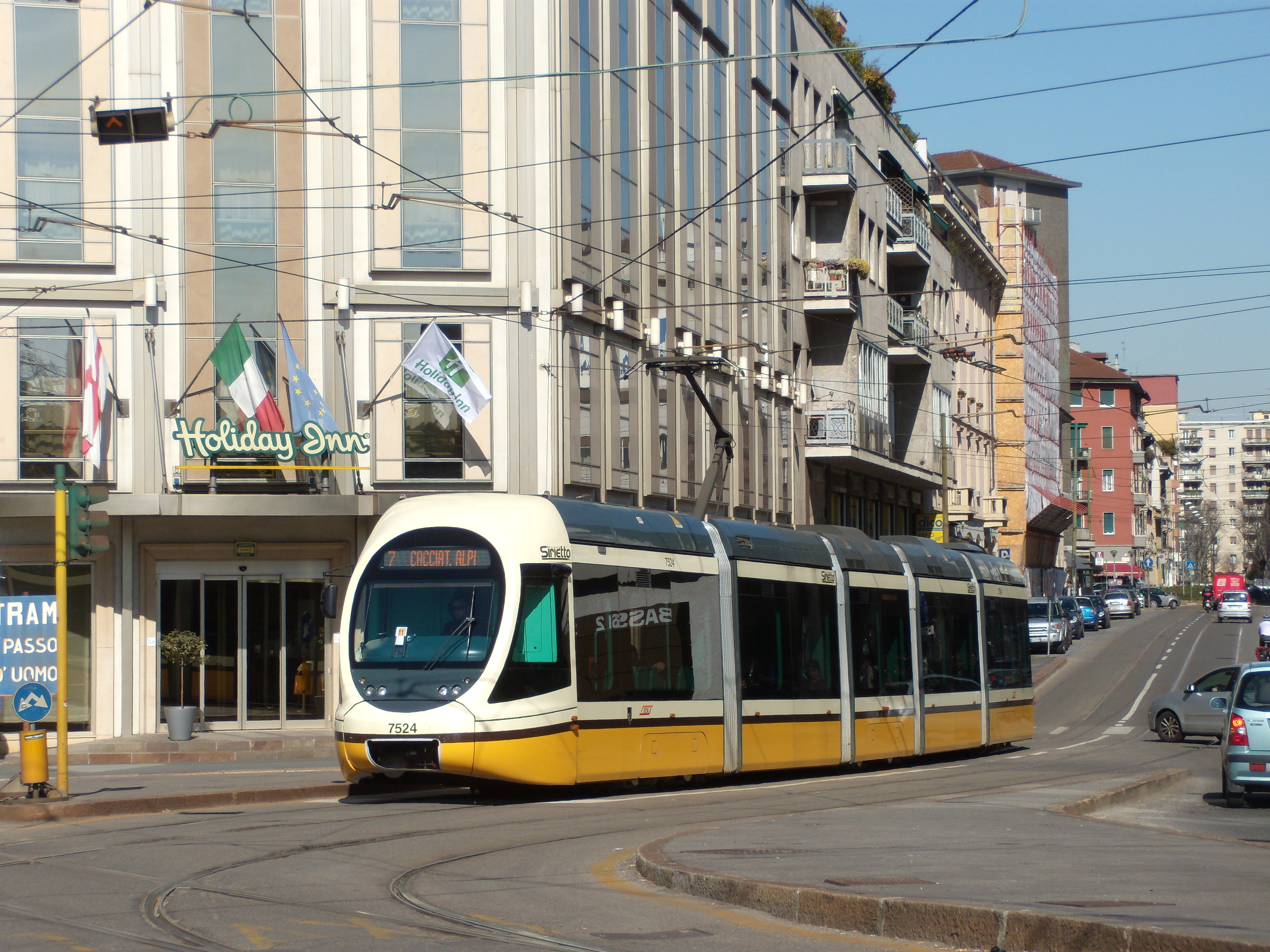
Series 7500/7600

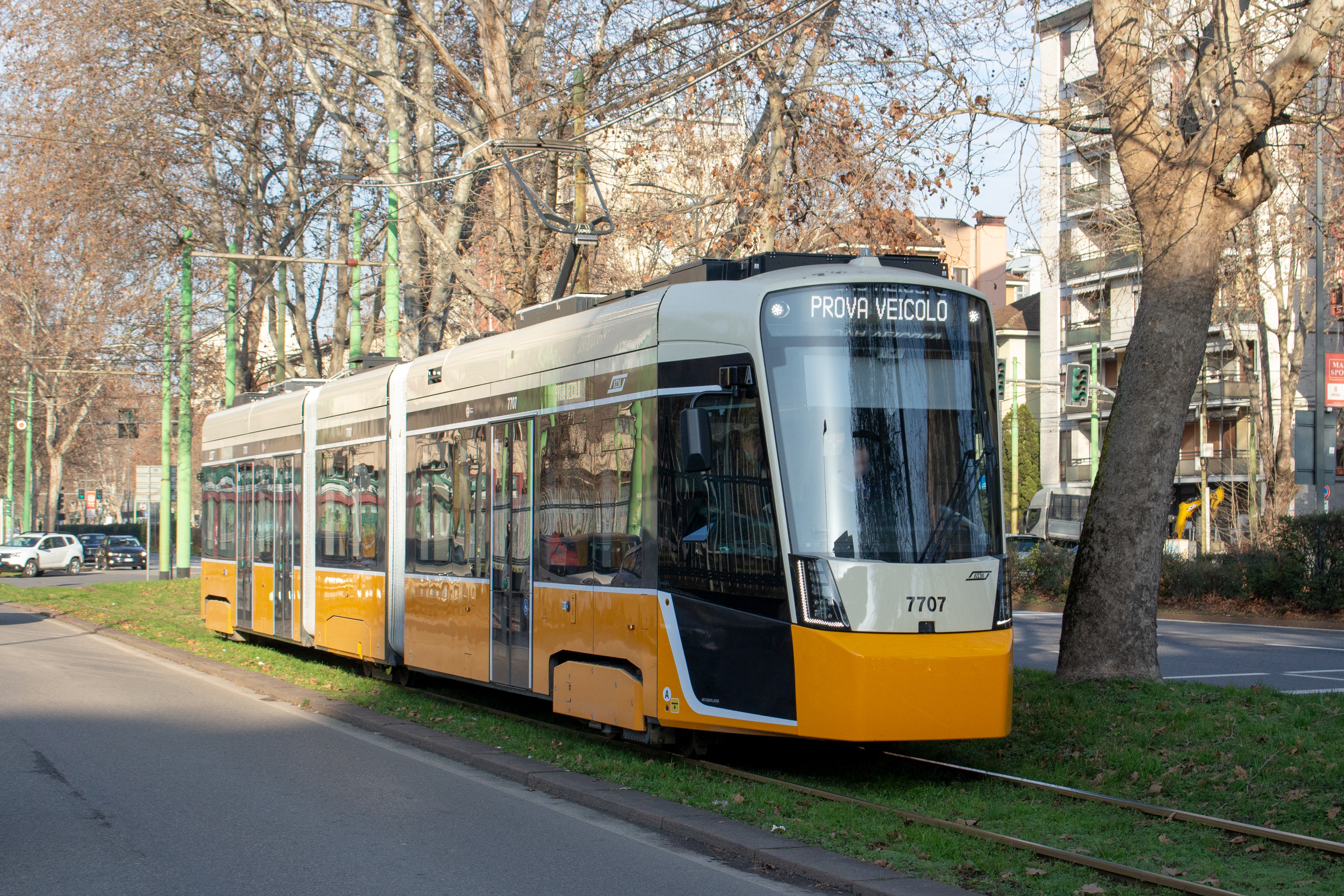
Series 7700

=== Future fleet ===
The first of the new three-section bidirectional Tramlink "series 7700" (originally numbered as "series 7200") entered service in February 2025 on lines 7 and 31. These vehicles are expected to replace the older high-floor trams, with the exception of the series 1500.

== Depots ==
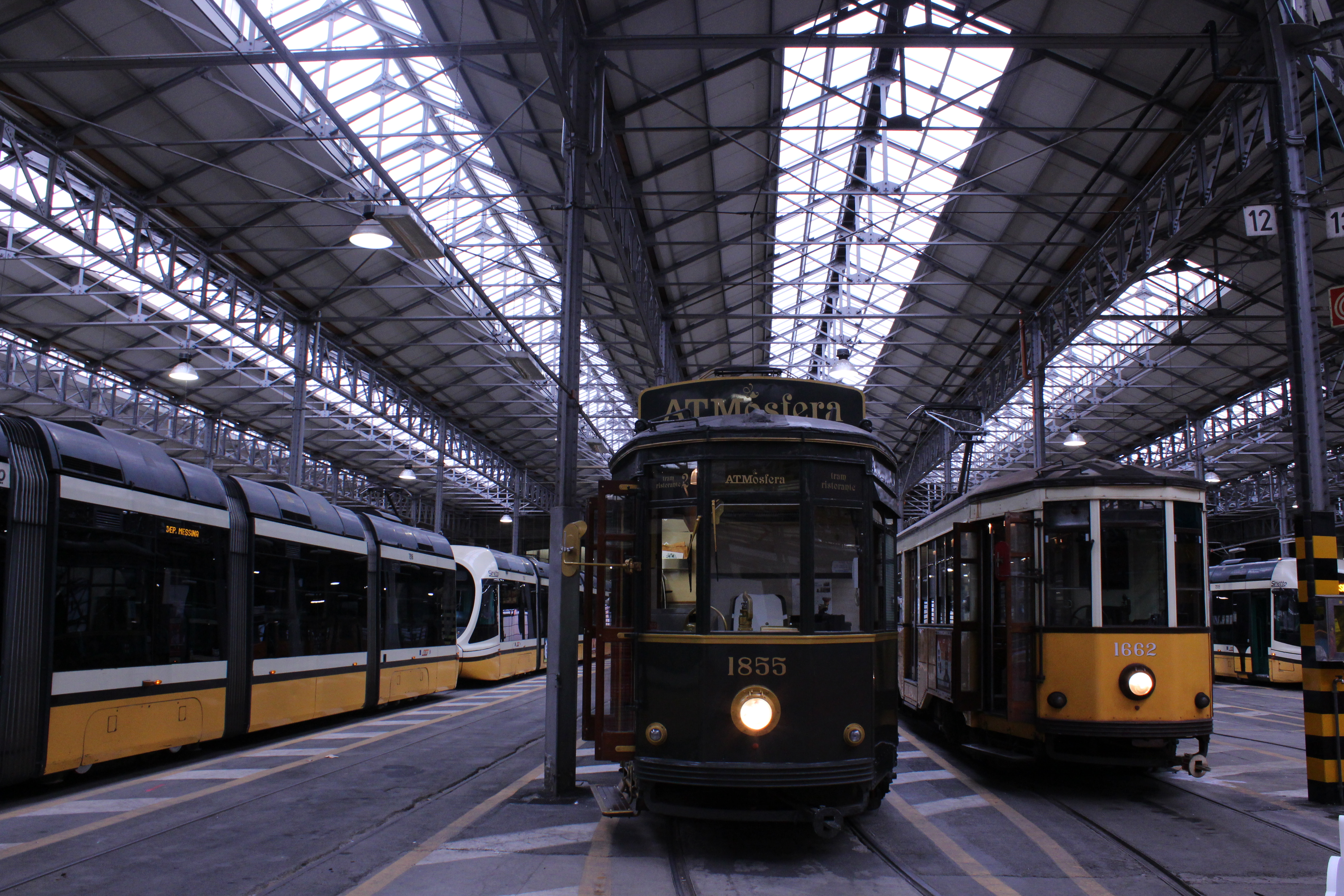
Trams at Messina Depot

Milan and its hinterland have several depots for the maintenance and refurbishing of trams.

The ATM operates seven depots (five urban and two interurban), at the following addresses:

- Via Ruggero Leoncavallo, 32 - Milano
- Via Messina, 41 - Milano
- Via Forze Armate, 80 - Milano (known as Baggio depot)
- Via Pietro Custodi, 7 - Milano (known as Porta Ticinese depot)
- Via Anassagora (Precotto) - Milano
- Via Milano, 4 - Varedo (interurban depot)
- Corso Italia, 150 - Desio (interurban depot, currently abandoned)

== Projects ==
The southernmost section of Via Ripamonti, running from the Vigentino neighbourhood to the municipal border with Opera is being prepared for an eventual extension of line 24, but no procurement for actual track-laying and tram operation has been approved as of March 2016. In December 2022, the municipality approved the project for an extension of the line of 1.3 km to the IEO (literally: "European Institute of oncology"), which will take the tram closer to Opera.

Furthermore, the tram network is going to be extended on the right of way of the never built "Strada Interquartiere Nord" (which was planned to be a major road running through the northern neighbourhoods of Milan) in order to create a direct links through the north of the city: tracks will be extended east, to connect with Cascina Gobba metro station on the M2 line, and west, to Affori (on line M3), Bovisa (on the regional and suburban rail network) and Villapizzone (also on the suburban rail network), to then finally terminate at Certosa railway station. As of June 2025, line 7 is being extended from Bicocca to Niguarda hospital to the west and from Precotto to "Quartiere Adriano" and Cascina Gobba to the east; as part of the same project, works have started on the section to Bovisa to Villapizzone railway station, connecting and extending line 2 to the west.

== Derailments ==
On the afternoon of February 27, 2026, around 4:00 PM, a tram derailed. Travelling on line 9 coming from Piazza della Repubblica, it struck a building between Via Lazzaretto and Viale Vittorio Veneto. Two people died and up to 54 were injured. During questioning, the driver claimed to have felt ill and failed to activate the switch, thus causing the tram to derail.

== See also ==
- History of rail transport in Italy
- List of town tramway systems in Italy
- Rail transport in Italy
- Railway stations in Milan
