= Giovanni Klaus Koenig =

Italian architect, designer and architectural historian (1924–1989)

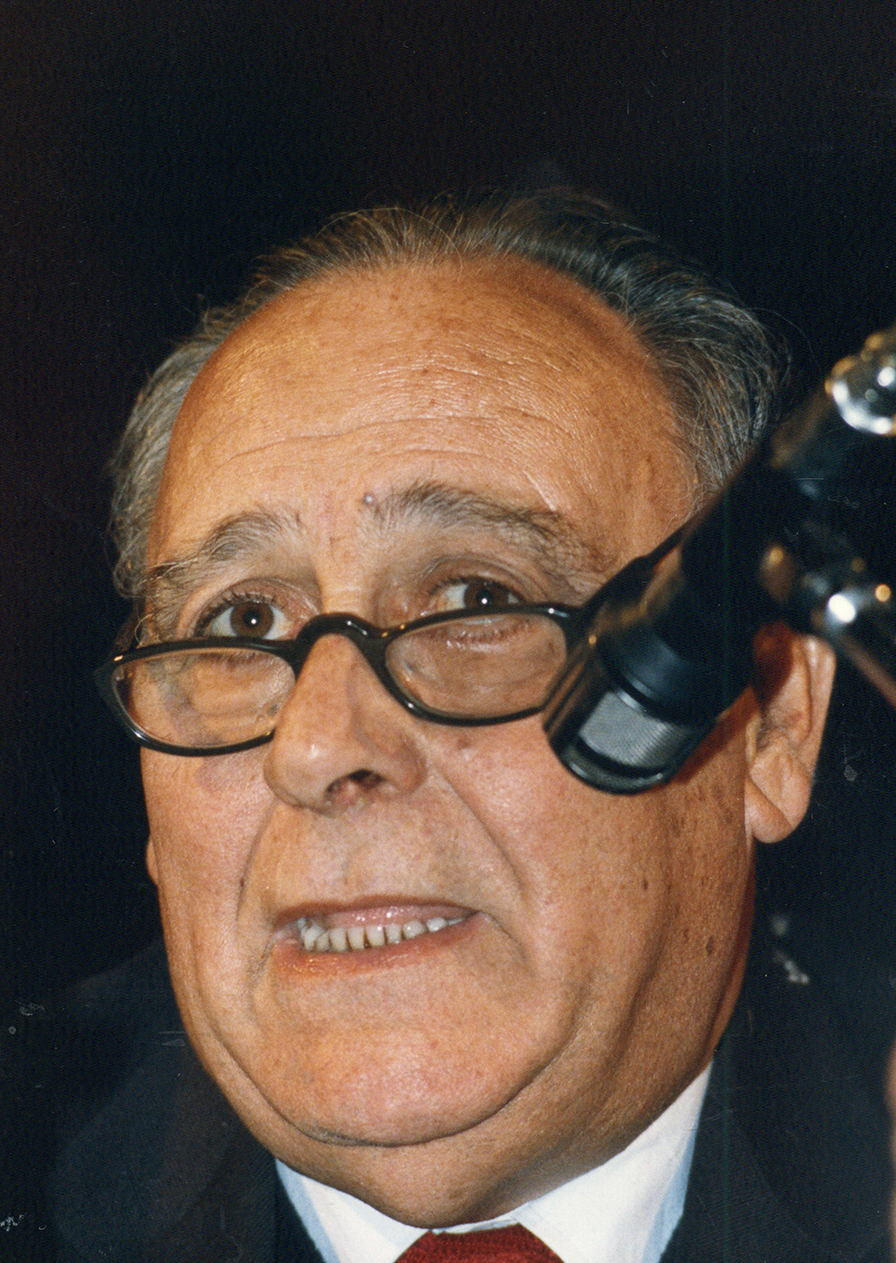
- Born: 22 November 1924; Turin, Kingdom of Italy
- Died: 9 December 1989 (aged 65); Florence, Italy
- Occupations: Architect, designer, academic, critic

Giovanni Klaus Koenig (22 November 1924 – 9 December 1989) was an Italian architect, designer, academic, and architectural theorist known for his influential writings on architecture and design.

== Life ==
Koenig was born in Turin in 1924 and later moved to Florence, where he studied architecture, graduating from the University of Florence in 1950. He began teaching soon after, becoming a professor of architectural history and theory, and later teaching courses on modern architecture and design. Koenig co-founded the Istituto Superiore per le Industrie Artistiche (ISIA) in Florence in 1975 and contributed to influential architecture magazines such as Casabella and Parametro. He died in Florence in 1989.

== Selected works ==
- School in San Marcello Pistoiese (1956)
- Valdese Church in Genoa (1960)
- Italgas employee housing, Florence (1961)
- Valdese Church in Ivrea (1965)
- Valdese Church in San Secondo di Pinerolo (1956)
- Jumbo Tram for Milan (transport design)
- Electromotive units for the Rome Metro and commuter trains for Ferrovie delle Stato and Ferrovie Nord Milano (transport design)

== Selected writings ==
- L'invecchiamento dell'architettura moderna (1963)
- Analisi del linguaggio architettonico (1964)
- Industrial design, pop art e popular design (1967)
- Architettura in Toscana 1931-1968 (1968)
- Architettura e comunicazione (1970)
- Oltre il Pendolino. Alta velocità e assetto variabile negli elettrotreni italiani (1986)
- Il design è un pipistrello mezzo topo e mezzo uccello (1995)
- Architettura del Novecento: teoria, storia, pratica, critica (1995)

== Sources ==
- Borsi, F.; Gurrieri, E. (1991). Koenig, due testimonianze. Florence: LEF.
- Ghelli, Cecilia; Insabato, Elisabetta, eds. (2007). Guida agli archivi di architetti e ingegneri del Novecento in Toscana. Florence: Edifir. pp. 219–222.
- Messina, Claudio (1994). Me ne vado e sbatto l'uscio. Giovanni Klaus Koenig. Architetture. Florence: Alinea.
- Tonelli, M.C., ed. (2021). Giovanni Klaus Koenig: Un fiorentino nel dibattito nazionale su architettura e design. Florence: Firenze University Press.
