= ATM Class 4900 =

Articulated light rail vehicle

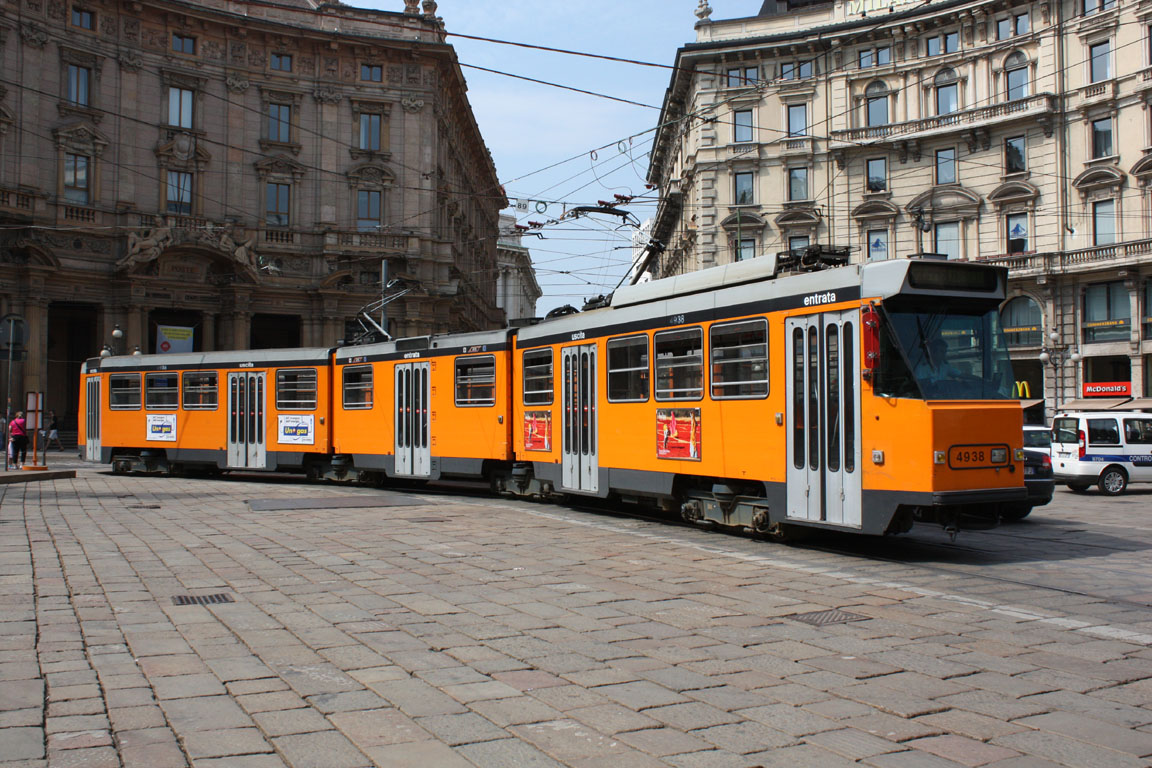
- Manufacturer: 1st series: Fiat Ferroviaria; 2nd series: Stanga
- Constructed: 1976–1978
- Entered service: 1976
- Number built: 100
- Fleet numbers: 1st series: 4900–4949; 2nd series: 4950–4999
- Capacity: 60 (Seated); 210 (Standing)
- Operators: Azienda Trasporti Milanesi

Specifications
- Train length: 29.210 m (95 ft 10 in)
- Width: 2.380 m (7 ft 9 3/4 in)
- Height: 3.750 m (12 ft 3 3/4 in)
- Floor height: 942 mm (37 in)
- Low-floor: No
- Articulated sections: Three
- Wheel diameter: 690 mm (27 1/8 in)
- Wheelbase: 1.800 m (5 ft 10 3/4 in)
- Maximum speed: 60 km/h (37 mph)
- Weight: 1st series: 31.8 tonnes (70,000 lb); 2nd series: 31.6 tonnes (70,000 lb)
- Traction motors: 1st series: TIBB GLM 1354 K (I serie); 2nd series: AEG USG 6456r1
- Power output: 1st series: 290 kW (390 hp); 2nd series: 296 kW (397 hp)
- Electric system(s): 600 V DC, overhead line
- Current collection: Pantograph
- UIC classification: Bo′ 2′ 2′ Bo′
- Track gauge: 1,445 mm (4 ft 8 7/8 in)

The ATM Class 4900, Nicknamed the "Jumbotram" is a series of articulated trams used by the ATM on the Milan urban tramway network.

They were built from 1976 to 1978 in two series, by Fiat Ferroviaria and Stanga, respectively, and were intended to be used on the future light rail lines, like the proposed circular line that should substitute the existing circular trolleybus line.

However such lines were never built, and the 4900 were used on the existing network.

Starting from 2008, some units were equipped with an air conditioning system, while in 2011 the 4950 car underwent both an aesthetic and functional revamping in order to gradually revamp the series. After a long phase of tests and checks conducted by the company operating the tram network, ATM, in 2014 this unit entered service and by mid-2015 another 19 revamped units were delivered by the AnsaldoBreda company. As of 2018, there were a total of 40 revamped trams in service out of a total of 51 envisioned by the contract; the last car was delivered by the end of 2019.

In 2023, the cars which were not subject to the previous revamping still in service were repainted with Milan's yellow tram livery, which gradually replaced the original "arancio ministeriale" color scheme, so as to match the coloring of the other trams in service. The cars used a different scheme than the previous 4900 revamping.

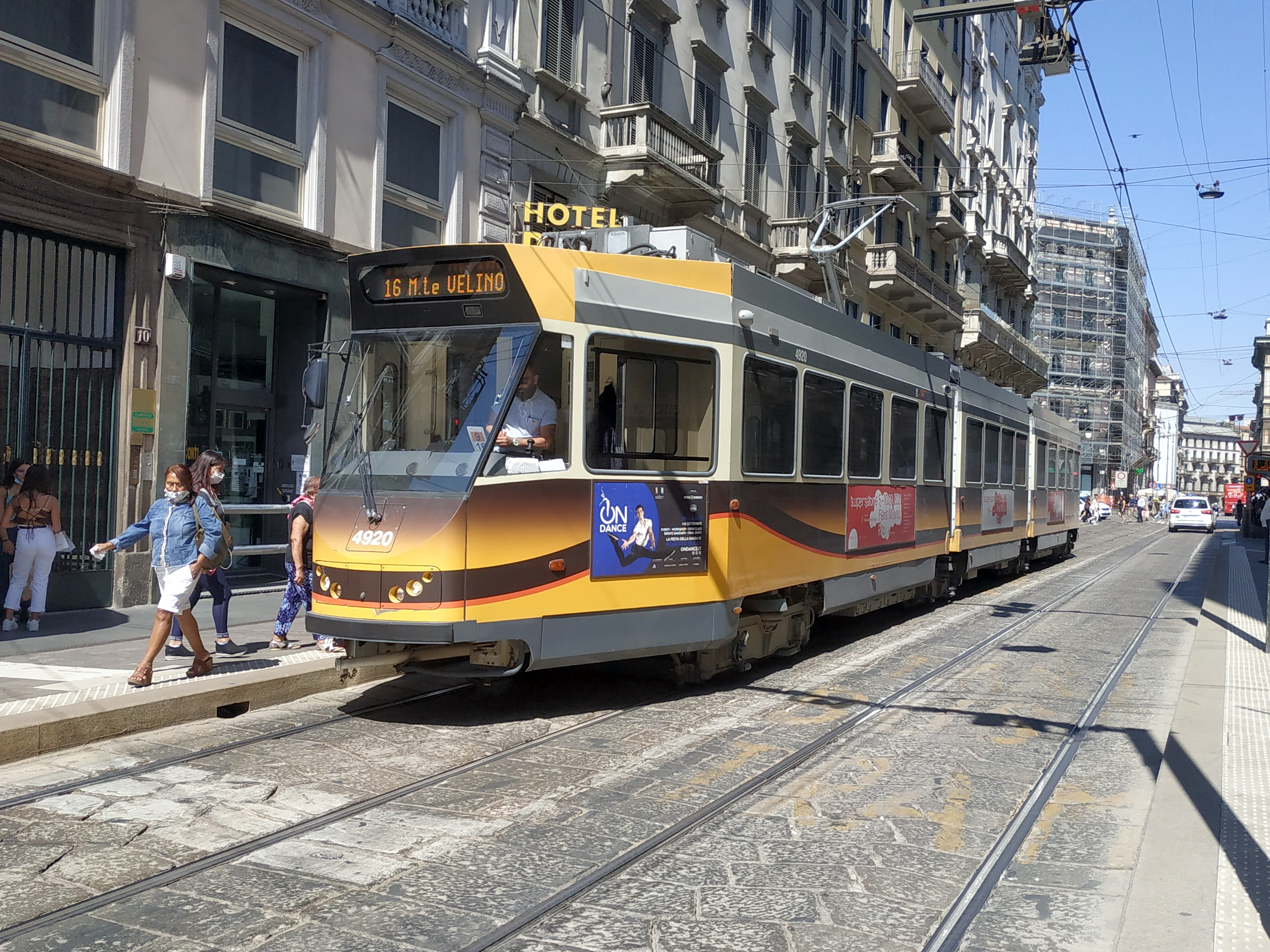
Revamped 4900

== Bibliography ==
- Carlo Marzorati: Le nuove elettromotrici ATM 4900. In: ″Italmodel Ferrovie″ Nr. 202 (March 1977), p. 156–160.
- Giovanni Klaus Koenig: Il tram a pianale ribassato: storia e sviluppi. In: ″Ingegneria Ferroviaria″, May 1985, p. 223–241.
- Giovanni Cornolò, Giuseppe Severi: Tram e tramvie a Milano 1840-1987., Azienda Trasporti Municipali, Milan 1987.
