= ATM Class 4600 and 4700 =

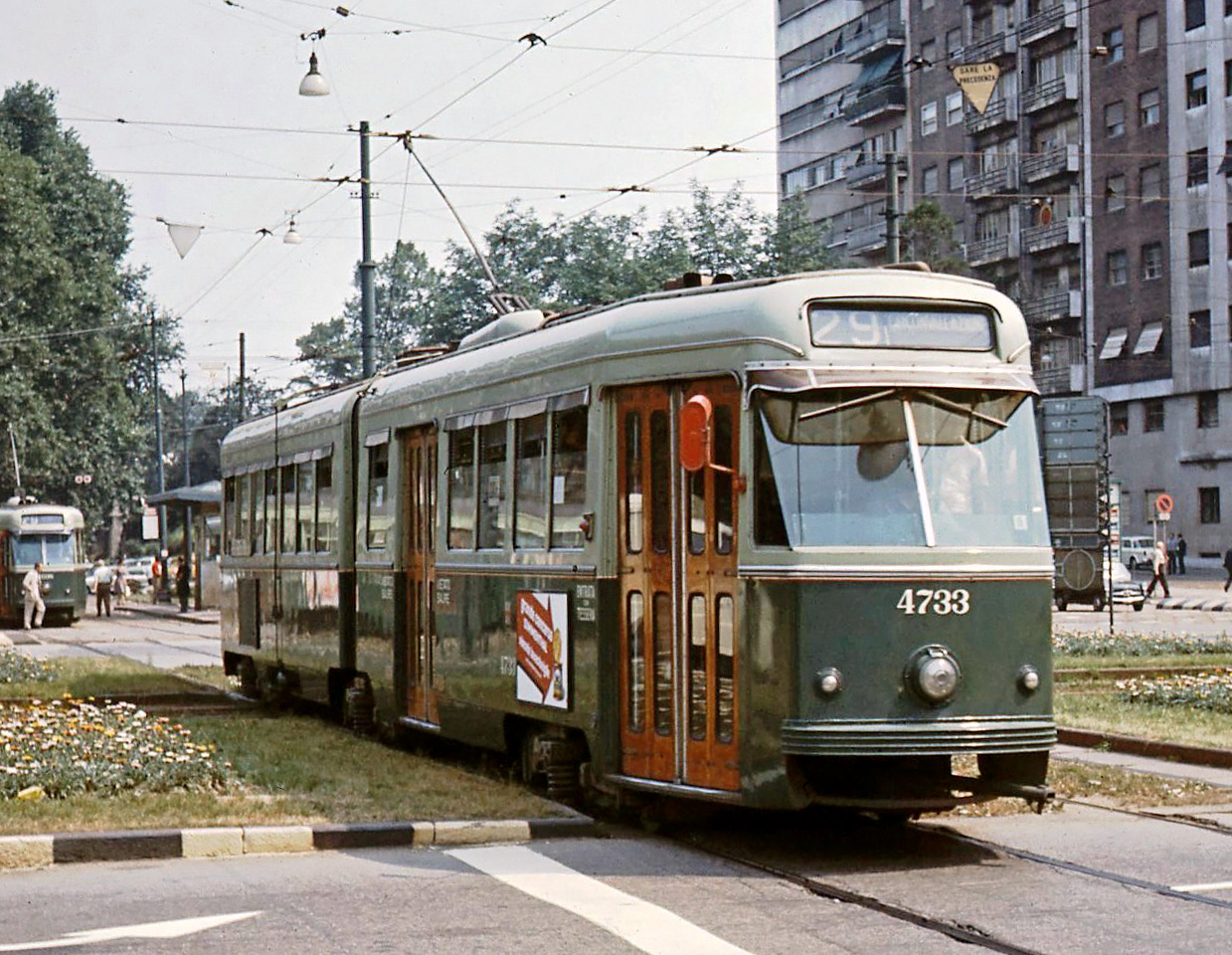
- Car no. 4733 in 1969, in the original livery and using a trolley pole
- Manufacturer: Stanga, Breda
- Constructed: 1955–1960
- Number built: 13 (Class 4600); 20 (Class 4700)
- Fleet numbers: 4601–4613; 4714–4733
- Capacity: 36 (Seated); 139 (Standing)

Specifications
- Train length: 19,840 mm (65 ft 1 in)
- Low-floor: no
- Articulated sections: 2
- Wheelbase: 1,800 mm (71 in)
- Maximum speed: 50 km/h
- Weight: 26.5 t (58,000 lb)
- Traction motors: TIBB GLM 0300
- Power output: 220.8 kW (296.1 hp)
- Power supply: 600 V DC; Overhead line
- Current collector(s): Pantograph
- Track gauge: 1,445 mm (4 ft 8 7/8 in)

The ATM Class 4600 and 4700 are a series of articulated trams used by the ATM on the Milan urban tramway network.

They were projected in the 1950s as an articulated version of the series 5300; originally a series of 15 cars (to be numbered from 4601 to 4615) was foreseen, but the two last units were delivered in an experimental "all electric| version and, because of that, were numbered in the 4700 series. Some years later a second series of "all-electric" cars was built, numbered from 4716 to 4733, and bringing the total number of 4700-type cars to 20 vehicles.

Originally, the cars were painted in a two-tone-green livery, later repainted in the orange livery, and since 2010 in a white-and-yellow livery.

Beginning from early 2017, the 4700 series were gradually revamped, with flooring, sections of the chassis and interior furnishing being replaced. Air conditioning was also implemented.

On the 25th of February 2025, after years of slow retirement due to the ageing of the fleet, the last 4600 was removed from service. The 4700 series persist and are still in service.

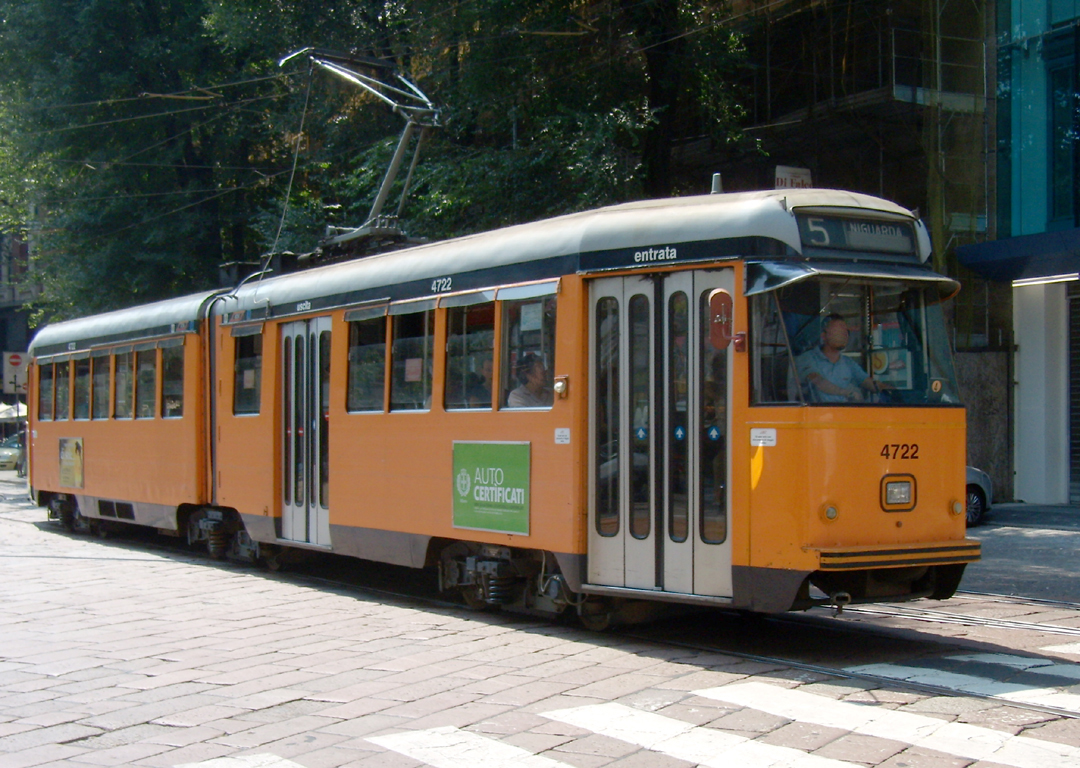
Car nr. 4722 in orange livery

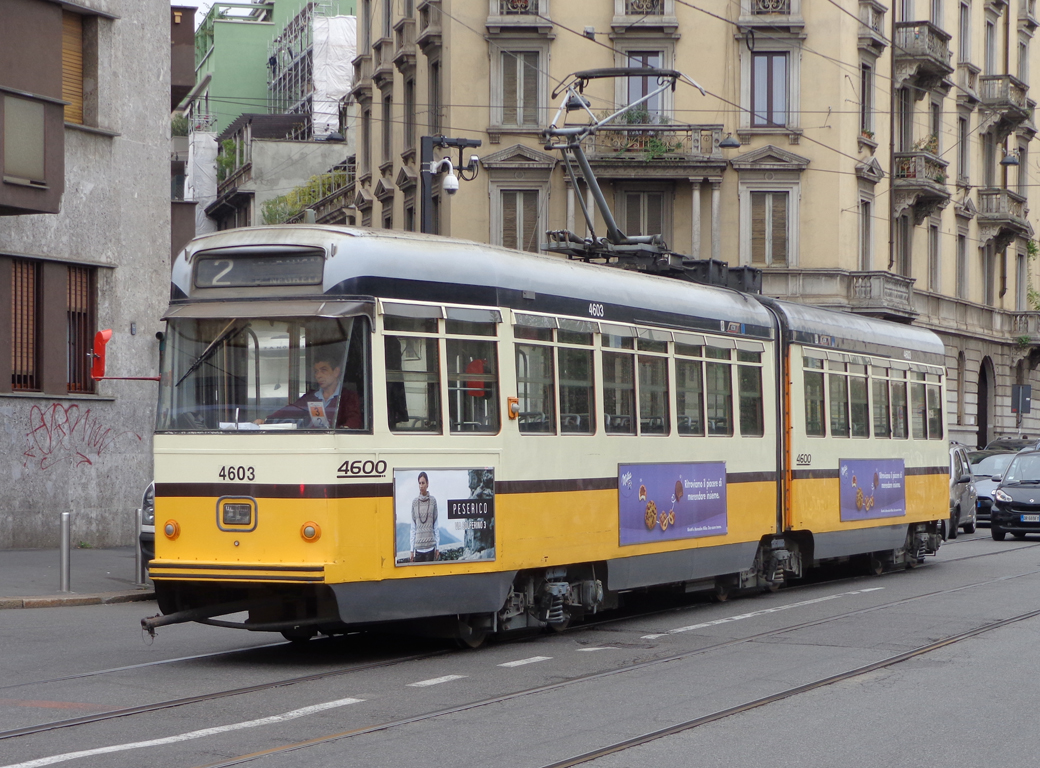
Car nr. 4603 in white and yellow livery

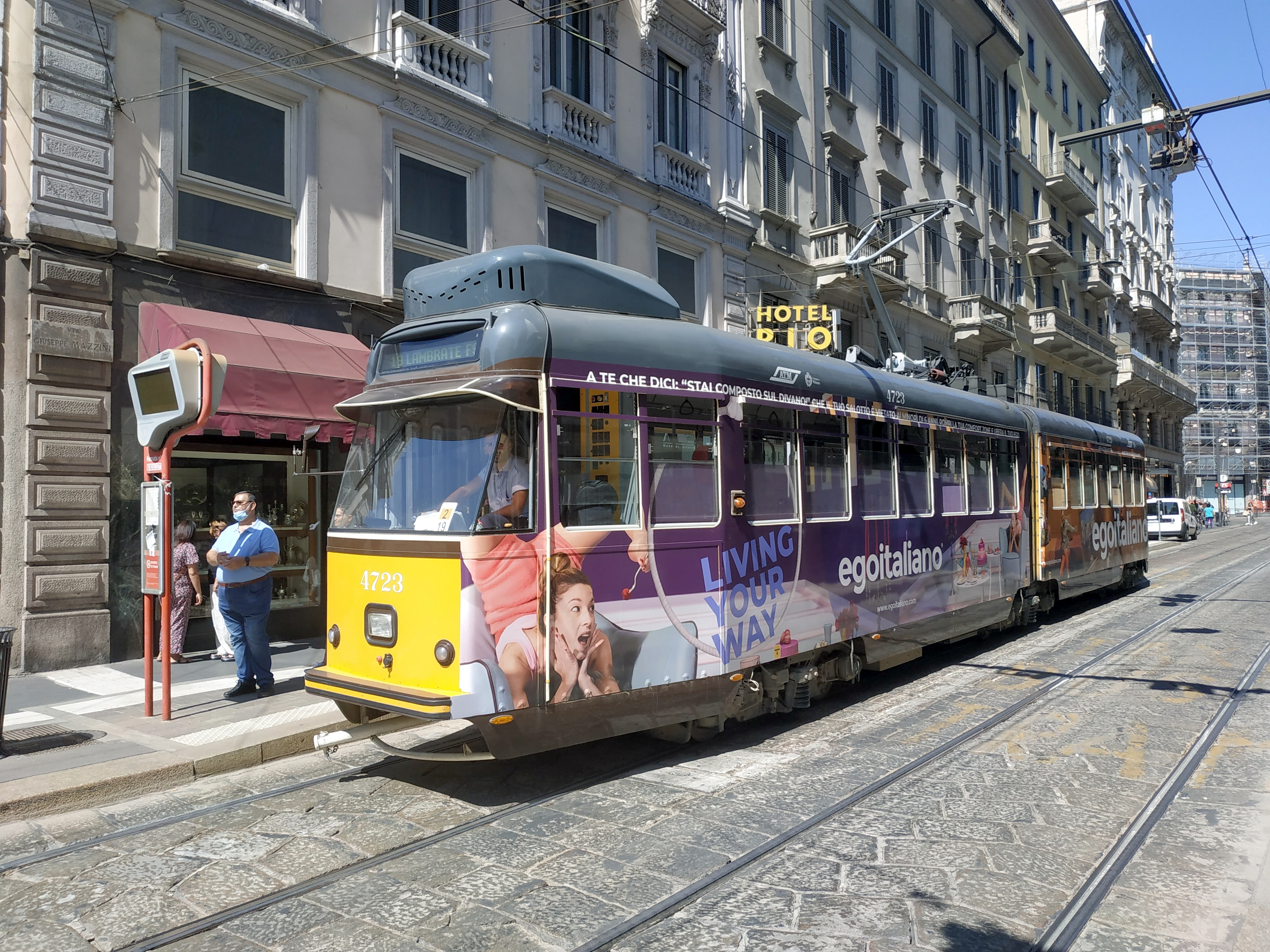
Car nr. 4723, revamped in 2017

== Bibliography ==
- Giovanni Cornolò, Giuseppe Severi: Tram e tramvie a Milano 1840-1987., Azienda Trasporti Municipali, Milan 1987.
